= List of marine invertebrates of the Cape Peninsula and False Bay =

Regional biodiversity species list

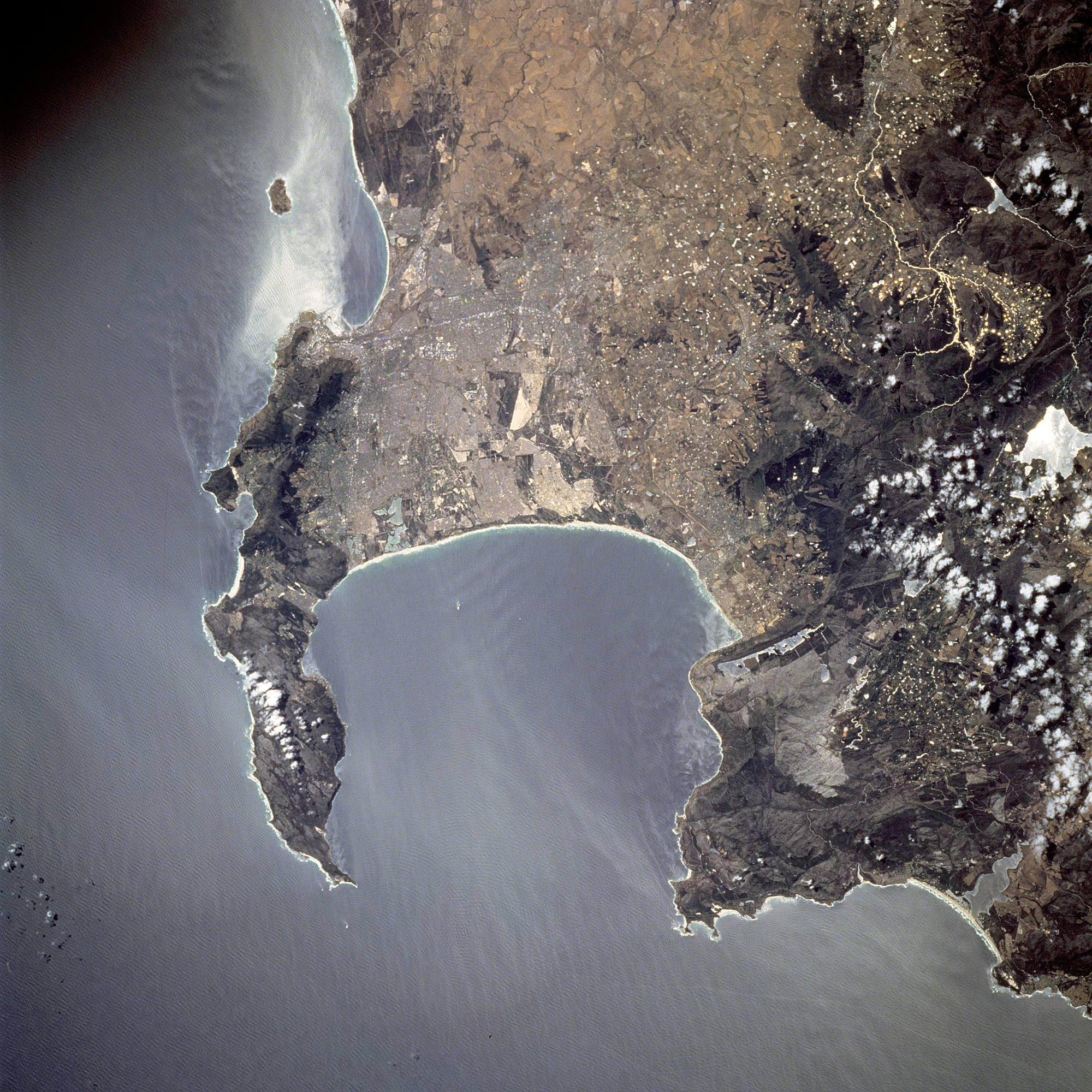
Astronaut photo of Cape Town showing the Cape Peninsula, and surrounding waters, including False Bay.

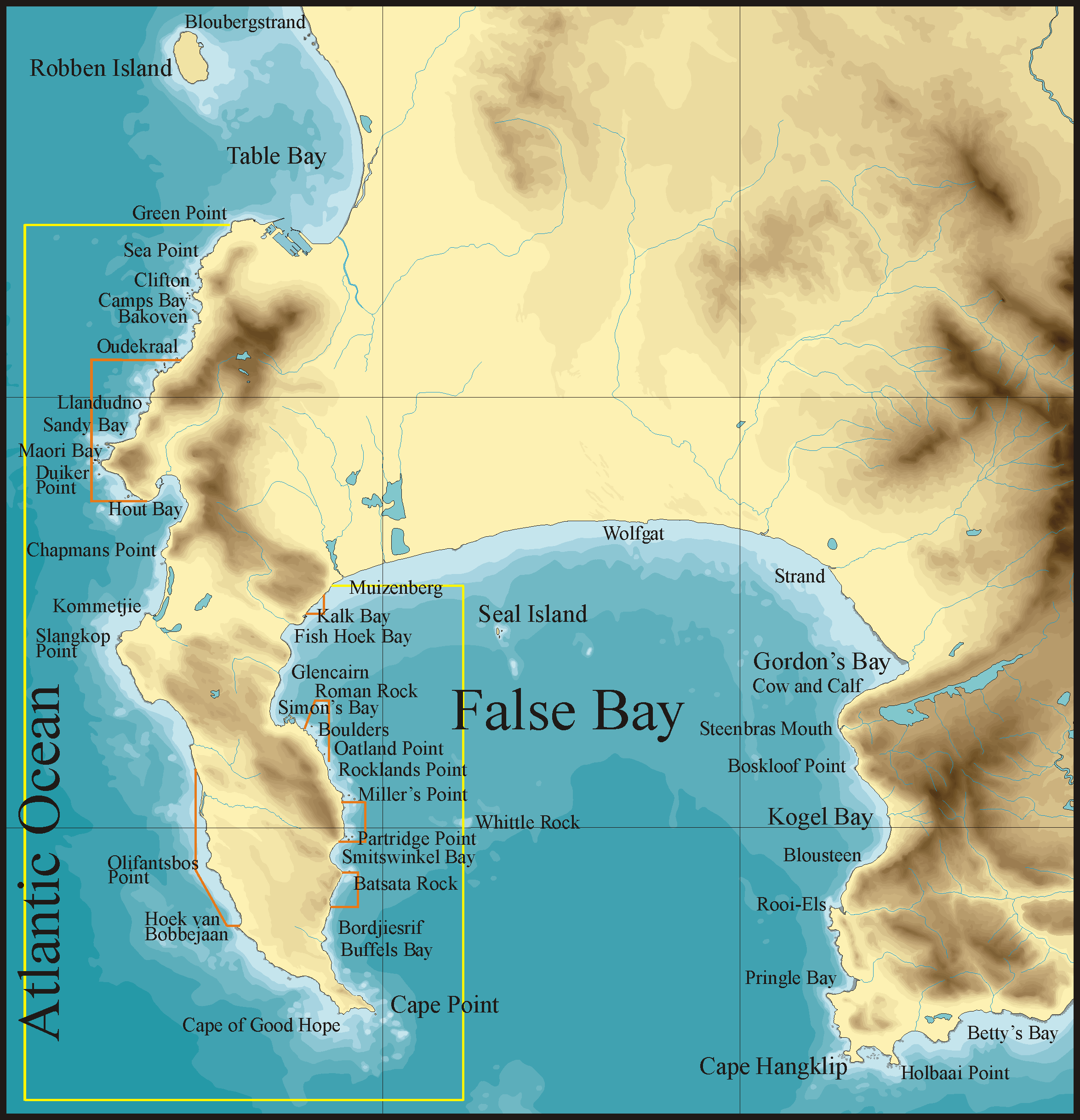
Map showing approximate extent of the range of the article and identifying key locations and the borders of the Table Mountain National Park Marine Protected Area

Marine ecoregions of the South African exclusive economic zone

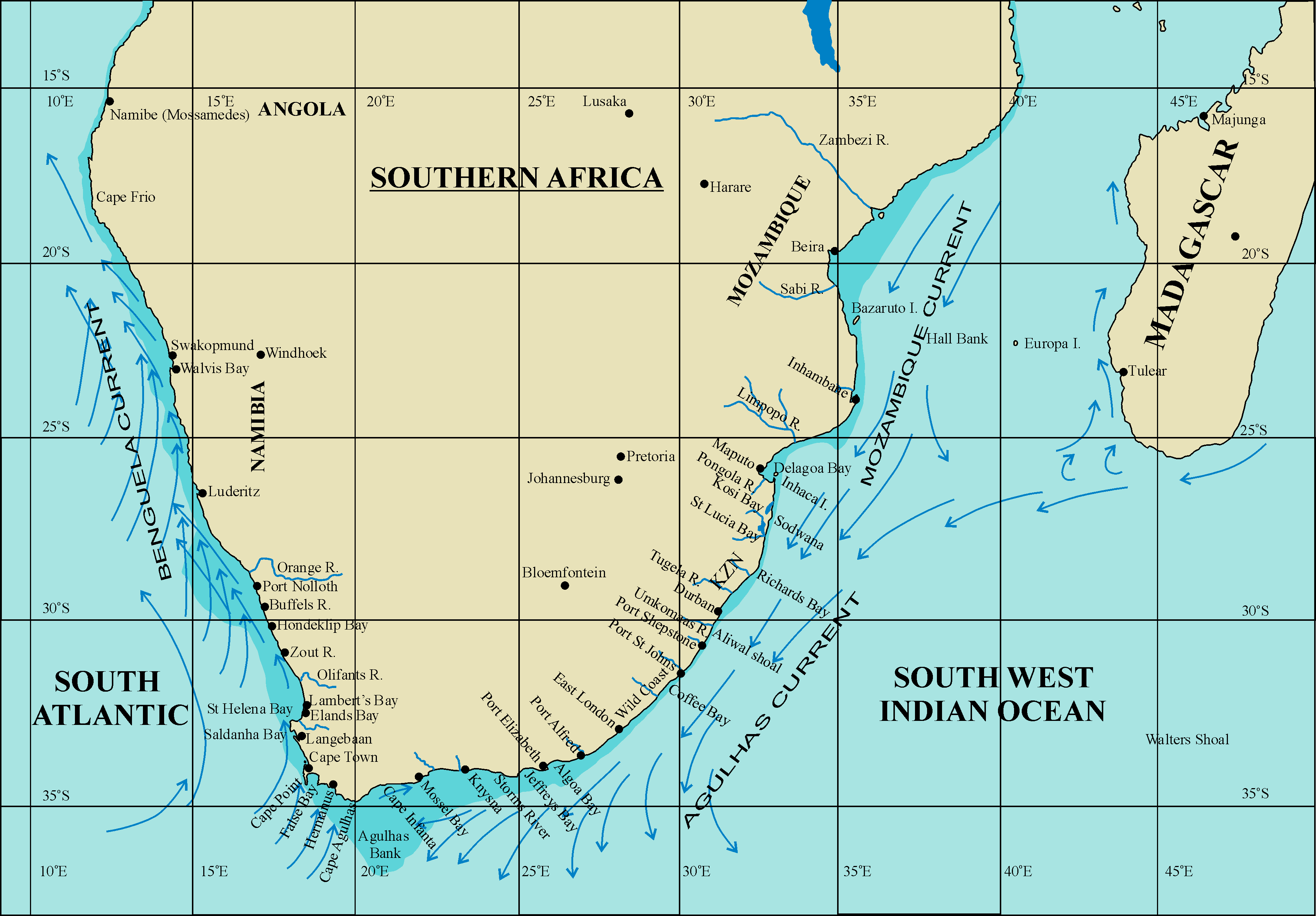
Marine species distribution reference map of the Southern African coastline, showing key range locations

The list of marine invertebrates of the Cape Peninsula and False Bay is a list of marine and shore-based invertebrate animal species that form a part of the fauna of South Africa and that have been recorded from this geographical range. In some cases they are an important part of the ecological community, and others may have been passing through, or were carried out of their natural ranges by the vagaries of ocean currents or winds. Some of the animals are deep within their range of endemism, or near its borders, while others are cosmopolitan or recently arrived aliens. This list includes animals which live entirely marine lives, or which spend critical parts of their lives at sea, or rely on the sea or intertidal shore for the major part of their diet.

The geographical range is from Bloubergstrand at the north of Table Bay to Cape Hangklip, the south eastern limit of False Bay, in the Western Cape province of South Africa and includes the Table Mountain National Park Marine Protected Area (TMNP MPA), the Helderberg Marine Protected Area, and part of the Robben Island Marine Protected Area.

Most of the shore is within the City of Cape Town, except for a section of the east coast of False Bay, south of Kogel Bay, which is in the Overstrand Local Municipality

The region is near to several universities and research institutions in Cape Town and Stellenbosch, which has led to many studies of the organisms and of the marine ecology, particularly those organisms that are easily or incidentally collected. The popularity of these waters for recreational diving has led to an increase in reported underwater photographic observations in recent years.

== Sponges ==
=== Calcarea – lime sponges ===
Order Leucosolenida

Family Sycettidae

- Hairy tube sponge, Sycon spp. (Saldanha Bay to Kosi Bay)

Family Leucosoleniidae

- Branching ball sponge, Leucosolenia sp. (Cape Peninsula to Cape Agulhas)
- Tube sponge, Leucosolenia sp. (Port Nolloth to Sodwana Bay)

=== Demospongiae – fibre or horny sponges ===
Order Astrophorida

Family Ancorinidae

- Grey wall sponge, Stelletta agulhana Lendenfield, 1907 (Northern Cape to KwaZulu-Natal)

Order Hadromerida

Family Clionaidae

- Rosetted sponge, Cliona aff. celata (Namibia to Cape Peninsula)
- Boring sponge, Cliona celata Grant, 1826 (Lüderitz to Durban)

Family Polymastiidae

- Teat-sponge, Polymastia mamillaris (Müller, 1806) (dubious), (Saldanha Bay to Port St. Johns) possibly Polymastia littoralis Stephens, 1915.
- Atlantic teat-sponge, Polymastia atlantica Samaai & Gibbons, 2005 (Lüderitz to Cape Peninsula)

Family Trachycladidae

- Orange wall sponge, vented sponge, Trachycladus spinispirulifer (Carter, 1879) (Cape Peninsula to Cape Agulhas)

Family Suberitidae

- Dusty sponge, Suberites aff. ficus (both side of the Cape Peninsula, also southern Namibia, Mediterranean, Pacific and north Atlantic)

Family Tethyidae

- Golf ball sponge, Tethya aurantium (Lüderitz to Durban)

Order Halichondrida

Family Halichondriidae

- Crumb-of-bread sponge, Hymeniacidon perlevis (Montagu, 1818) (Northern Cape to Port St. Johns, also north Atlantic, Mediterranean and the Pacific)

Order Poecilosclerida

Family Chondropsidae

- Scroll sponge, Chondropsis sp. (Olifants River to Cape Peninsula)

Family Crambeidae

- Stellar sponge, Crambe acuata (Lévi, 1958) syn. Crambe chelastra (Lüderitz to Cape Peninsula)

Family Latrunculiidae

- Green moon sponge, Latrunculia lunaviridis Samaai and Kelly 2004, (Oudekraal to Cape Point)
- Vented sponge, Latrunculia (Biannulata) spinispiraefera Brøndsted, 1924 (Angola to Durban)
- Tsitsikamma scurra Samaai and Kelly 2004, (Hout Bay)

Family Isodictyidae

- Brain sponge, Isodictya elastica (Vosmaer, 1880) (West Coast to Port Elizabeth)(Lüderitz to Cape Point)
- Flat leaf sponge, Isodictya grandis (Ridley & Dendy, 1886) (West Coast to False Bay)
- Fanned kelp sponge, Isodictya frondosa (Lévi, 1963) (Orange river to Cape Point)

Family Microcionidae

- Broad-bladed tree sponge, Clathria (Clathria) dayi Levi, 1963 (West Coast to the Cape Peninsula)
- Red encrusting sponge, Clathria (Isociella) oudekraalensis Samaai & Gibbons, 2005 (Cape Peninsula)
- Nodular sponge, Clathria (Thalysias) hooperi Samaai & Gibbons, 2005, also recorded as Clathria hooperi Samaai & Gibbons, 2005, (Cape Peninsula)
- Tree sponge, Echinoclathria dichotoma (Levi, 1963) (West Coast to Cape Agulhas)

Family Desmacellidae

- Yellow encrusting sponge, Biemna anisotoxa Levi, 1963 (West Coast to Port Elizabeth)

Order Haplosclerida

Family Chalinidae

- Turret sponge, Haliclona (Haliclona) anonyma (Stephens, 1915) (Cape Peninsula to Sodwana Bay)
- Encrusting turret sponge, Haliclona (Haliclona) stilensis Burton, 1933 (West and South Coasts)

Order Dictyoceratida

Family Irciniidae

- Black stink sponge, Ircinia arbuscula (Hyatt, 1877) (syn. Sarcotragus australis) (Cape Peninsula to Cape Agulhas, also Australia) Note: Ircinia arbuscula (Lendenfeld, 1888) is syn. of Sarcotragus australis (Lendenfeld, 1888), so this needs to be clarified.
- Sand cup sponge, Psammocinia cf. arenosa (Orange River to Cape Peninsula)

== Cnidarians ==
=== Anthozoa ===
==== Hexacorallians ====
Order: Actiniaria – Anemones

Family Actiniidae

- Plum anemone, Actinia ebhayiensis Schama, Mitchell & Solé-Cava, 2011. (TMNP MPA). Recorded as Plum anemone Actinia mandelae from about Lüderitz to Durban
- Violet-spotted anemone, Anthostella stephensoni Carlgren, 1938 (Lüderitz to Richards Bay, endemic)
- Anthopleura insignis Carlgren, 1940, (TMNP MPA).
- Long-tentacled anemone, Anthopleura michaelseni (Pax, 1920) (Lüderitz to Durban)
- Dwarf-spotted anemone, Anthostella n. sp. (Cape Peninsula to Port Elizabeth, possibly endemic) (still being described)
- Sandy anemone, Bunodactis reynaudi (Milne-Edwards, 1857) (Lüderitz to Durban) (syn. Aulactinia reynaudi)
- Knobbly anemone, Bunodosoma capense also recorded as Bunodosoma capensis (Lesson, 1830) (Lüderitz to Durban)
- Spinnaker anemone, candy-striped anemone, Korsaranthus natalensis (Carlgren, 1938) (False Bay to Durban)
- False plum anemone, Pseudactinia flagellifera (Drayton in Dana, 1846) (Lüderitz to Durban)
- Clown anemone undescribed (False Bay)

Family Halcampidae

- Brooding anemone, Halianthella annularis Carlgren, 1938 (Lamberts Bay to Cape Agulhas, endemic)

Family Haloclavidae

- Burrowing anemone, Haloclava capensis (Verrill, 1865), (TMNP MPA).(Table Bay to Cape Agulhas)

Family Hormathiidae

- Symbiotic anemone, Calliactis polypus (Forsskål, 1775), (TMNP MPA).(Natal)

Family Sagartiidae

- Striped anemone, Anthothoe chilensis(Lesson, 1830) (Lüderitz to Richards Bay, also Argentina, Brazil, Chile and St. Helena)
- Striped anemone, Anthothoe stimpsonii (Verrill, 1869), (TMNP MPA). (Namibia to Eastern Cape)
- Square-mouth striped anemone, Anthothoe sp. (False Bay) (still being described)

Family Preactiidae

- Walking anemone, sock anemone, hedgehog anemone, Preactis millardae England in England & Robson, 1984 (Cape Peninsula)

Family Isanthidae

- Ring-tentacle anemone, Isanthus capensis Carlgren, 1938 (South African Atlantic coast)

Order Corallimorpharia
Family Corallimorphidae

- Strawberry anemone, Corynactis annulata (Verrill, 1867) (Port Nolloth to Mossel Bay)

Order Zoanthids
Family Parazoanthidae

- Cape zoanthid, Isozoanthus capensis (Cape Peninsula to Port St Johns)
- Sponge zoanthid, Parazoanthus sp. (False Bay)

Order Cerianthids
Family Cerianthidae

- Burrowing anemone, tube anemone, Ceriantheopsis austroafricanus Molodtsova, Griffiths and Acuna 2012 (False Bay and Hermanus)
- White burrowing anemone Ceriantheopsis nikitai Molodtsova, 2001 (Table Bay)

Order Scleractinia
Family Dendrophylliidae

- Cup coral, Balanophyllia (Balanophyllia) bonaespei van der Horst, 1938 (Saldanha Bay to East London)

Family Caryophylliidae

- Large cup coral, Caryophyllia sp. (False Bay)

==== Octocorallians ====
Order Malacalcyonacea

Family Alcyoniidae

- Purple soft coral, Alcyonium fauri Studer, 1910 (Saldanha Bay to Richards Bay)
- Variable soft coral, Alcyonium variabile (J.S. Thomson, 1921), syn. Eleutherobia variabile (J.S. Thomson, 1921) (Cape Peninsula to northern KwaZulu-Natal)

Family Eunicellidae

- Flagellar sea fan, whip fan, Eunicella albicans (Kolliker, 1875) (Cape Peninsula to Port Elizabeth)
- Nippled sea fan, Eunicella microthela (Lamouroux, 1816) recorded as Eunicella papillosa (Esper, 1797) (Lüderitz to Sodwana)
- Sinuous sea fan, Eunicella tricoronata Velimirov, 1971 (Cape Peninsula to East London)

Family Gorgoniidae

- Gilchrist's sea fan, Leptogorgia gilchristi (Hickson, 1904), (TMNP MPA).
- Palmate sea fan, Leptogorgia palma (Pallas, 1766) (Cape Peninsula to Sodwana)

Family Leptophytidae

- Purple soft coral Tenerodus fallax (Lüttschwager, 1922), (TMNP MPA).(Cape Columbine to Richards' Bay)
- Brown soft coral, Tenerodus pollex McFadden & van Ofwegen, 2017 (TMNP MPA).

Family Malacacanthidae

- Sun-burst soft coral, Malacacanthus capensis (Hickson, 1900) (Cape Peninsula to southern KwaZulu-Natal)

Family Melithaeidae

- Multicoloured sea fan, Melithaea rubra (Esper, 1789) also recorded as syn. Acabaria rubra Esper, 1789 (Bloubergstrand to East London)

Family Nephtheidae

- Cauliflower soft coral, Eunephthya thyrsoidea (Verrill, 1865) (Cape Peninsula to northern KwaZulu-Natal)

Order Pennatulacea – sea pens
Family Echinoptilidae

- Radial sea pen, purple sea pen, Actinoptilum molle (Kukenthal, 1910) (whole South African coast)

Family Virgulariidae

- Feathery sea pen, Virgularia schultzei Kukenthal, 1910 (Lüderitz to central Mozambique)

Order Scleralcyonacea – sea fans
Family Parasphaerascleridae

- Valdivian soft coral, Parasphaerasclera valdiviae (Kukenthal, 1906), (TMNP MPA). (Lüderitz to Durban) also recorded as syn. Alcyonium valdiviae Kukenthal, 1906 (Cape Peninsula to northern KwaZulu-Natal)

Family Spongiodermidae

- Gorgonian twig coral, Homophyton verrucosum (Mobius, 1861) (False Bay to Sodwana)

=== Medusozoa ===
==== Staurozoa ====
Order Stauromedusae
family Depastridae

- Stalked trumpet jelly, Depastromorpha africana Carlgren, 1935 (Cape Peninsula to Hermanus)

Family Kishinouyeidae

- Calvadosia sp. (TMNP MPA).

Family Lipkeidae

- Bell stalked jelly, Lipkea stephensoni Carlgren, 1933 (Smitswinkel Bay)

==== Scyphozoa – true jellyfish ====
Order Semaeostomeae
Family Pelagiidae

- Compass jellyfish, Benguela compass jelly, redbanded jellyfish, Chrysaora fulgida (Reynaud, 1830), recorded as Chrysaora hysoscella (Linnaeus, 1767), which is now known to be restricted to the north Atlantic. (pelagic, Atlantic Ocean).
- Night-light jellyfish, Pelagia noctiluca (Forsskal, 1775) (pelagic, Atlantic Ocean, also Mediterranean and Pacific)

Family Ulmaridae

- Moon jellyfish, common jellyfish, Aurelia aurita (Linnaeus, 1758), (TMNP MPA).

Order Rhizostomeae
Family Rhizostomatidae

- Frilly-mouthed jellyfish, Rhizostoma pulmo Macri, 1778 (pelagic, Atlantic Ocean)
- Root-mouthed jellyfish, Eupilema inexpectata Pages, Gili & Bouillon, 1992 (pelagic, Atlantic Ocean)

Order Carybdeida
Family Carybdeidae

- Box jellyfish, sea wasp, Carybdea murrayana Haeckel, 1880 recorded as syn. Carybdea branchi Gershwin & Gibbons, 2009 (north of Namibia to Port Elizabeth)

==== Hydrozoans ====
Order Anthoathecata

Family Candelabridae

- Gnome's hat hydroid, Candelabrum capensis (Manton, 1940) (Lüderitz to East London) syn. Myriothela capensis
- Dreadlocks hydroid, Candelabrum tentaculatum Millard, 1966 (Cape Peninsula and Port Elizabeth) syn. Myriothela tentaculata

Family Eudendriidae

- Bushy hydroids, Eudendrium spp. (whole coast)

Family Hydractiniidae

- High-spined commensal hydroid, Hydractinia altispina Millard, 1955 (Lüderitz to False Bay)
- Shell-mimic hydroid, Hydrocorella africana Stechow, 1921 (West Coast to Durban)

Family Porpitidae

- Blue button, Porpita porpita (Port Nolloth to Mozambique, pelagic, warm waters.)
- By-the-wind sailor, Velella velella (Port Nolloth to Mozambique, pelagic, warm waters.)

Family Solanderiidae

- Grey fan hydroid, Solanderia procumbens (Carter, 1873) (Cape Peninsula to KwaZulu-Natal)

Family Stylasteridae

- Noble coral, Stylaster nobilis (Saville Kent, 1871) (Cape Peninsula to Port Elizabeth) syn. Allopora nobilis

Family Tubulariidae

- Tubular hydroid, pinkmouth hydroid, Ectopleura crocea (Agassiz, 1862) (Saldanha Bay to Sodwana Bay)
- Tubular sponge hydroid, Zyzzyzus warreni (Warren, 1906) (Saldanha Bay to Sodwana Bay) syn. Zyzzyzus solitarius Calder, 1988

Order: Leptothecata
Family Aequoreidae

- Crystal jellyfish, Aequorea forskalea Péron & Lesueur, 1810, (TMNP MPA). (pelagic, whole coast)

Family Aglaopheniidae

- Toothed feather hydroid, Aglaophenia pluma (Linnaeus, 1767) (whole coast)
- Smoky feather hydroid, Macrorhynchia filamentosa (Lamarck, 1816) syn. Lytocarpus filamentosus(Walvis Bay to Durban)

Family Campanulariidae

- Thin-walled obelia, Obelia dichotoma (Linnaeus, 1758) (Cosmopolitan. Alien, introduced on ships)
- Obelia geniculata (Linnaeus, 1758) (Lüderitz to Cape Agulhas)

Family Halopterididae

- Fine hydroid, Corhiza scotiae (Ritchie, 1907) (whole coast)
- Snowdrop hydroid, Gattya humilis Allman, 1886 (northern Namibia to KwaZulu-Natal)

Family Kirchenpaueriidae

- Feathery hydroid, Pycnotheca mirabilis (Allman, 1883) (False Bay to KwaZulu-Natal)
- Kirchenpaueria pinnata (Linnaeus, 1758) *Namibia to KwaZulu-Natal)

Family Plumulariidae

- Plumed hydroid, little sea bristle, Plumularia setacea (Linnaeus, 1758) (whole coast)

Family Sertulariidae

- Wiry hydroid, Amphisbetia operculata (Linnaeus, 1758) (Lüderitz to Durban)
- Planar hydroid, Sertularella arbuscula (Lamouroux, 1816) (Saldanha Bay to southern Mozambique)
- Jointed hydroid, Thuiaria articulata (Pallas, 1766) (whole coast) syn, Salacia articulata

Order Siphonophorae
Family Apolemiidae

- String jelly, barbed wire jellyfish, Apolemia uvaria (Lesueur, 1815) (pelagic, worldwide)

Family Forskaliidae

- Net jelly, Forskalia edwardsii (Kolliker, 1853) (pelagic, worldwide)

Family Physaliidae

- Bluebottle, Portuguese man-of-war, Physalia physalis (Linnaeus, 1758), recorded as syn. Physalia utriculus (La Martiniere, 1787) (pelagic, whole coast)

== Ctenophora – comb jellies ==
Order Beroida
Family Beroidae

- Cigar comb jelly, Beroe cucumis Fabricius, 1780, (pelagic, worldwide).

Order Cestida
Family Cestidae

- Venus girdle, Cestum veneris Lesueur, 1813 (pelagic, worldwide)

Order Cydippida
Family Pleurobrachiidae

- Sea gooseberry, Pleurobrachia bachei Agassiz, 1860 (pelagic, worldwide)

Order Lobata
Family Bolinopsidae

- Lobed comb jelly, Leucothea spp. (pelagic, worldwide)

Order Platyctenida
Family Coeloplanidae

- Benthic comb jelly, Coeloplana sp. (TMNP MPA).

== Platyhelminthes – flatworms ==
Order Polycladida
Family Notocomplanidae

- Limpet flatworm, Notocomplana erythrotaenia (Schmarda, 1859), recorded as syn. Notoplana patellarum (Stimpson, 1855), (TMNP MPA). (Cape Columbine to Eastern Cape)

Family Planoceridae

- Gilchrist's flatworm, Planocera gilchristi Jacubowa, 1906, (TMNP MPA). (Cape Peninsula to Maputo)

Family Pseudocerotidae

- Carpet flatworm, Thysanozoon brocchii (Risso, 1818). also reported as Thysanozoon sp. (Cape Peninsula to Port Elizabeth)

Incertae sedis

- Acoel flatworm, sponge flatworm. Undescribed. (Both sides of the Cape Peninsula)
- Striped flatworm. Undescribed. (Cape Peninsula and Port Elizabeth)
- Freckled flatworm. Undescribed. (Both sides of the Cape Peninsula)

== Annelida ==
Order Myzostomida
Family Myzostomatidae

- Crinoid worm, feather star myzostomid, Myzostoma fuscomaculatum Lanterbeque, 2008 (False Bay)

Order Sipuncula
Family Golfingiidae

- Common peanut worm, Golfingia capensis (Teuscher, 1874), (TMNP MPA). (Lüderitz to Mozambique)

=== Class Clitellata ===
==== Subclass Hirudinea – Leeches ====
Order Rhynchobdellida
Family Piscicolidae

- Warty leech, Pontobdella sp. (Cape Peninsula to Algoa Bay)

=== Class Polychaeta – bristleworms ===
==== Subclass Echiura ====
Order Echiuroidea
Family Thalassematidae

- Opaque tongue worm Listriolobus capensis (Jones & Stephen, 1954), recorded as syn. Ochetostoma capense Jones & Stephen, 1954, (TMNP MPA). (Cape Columbine to Eastern Cape)

==== Subclass Errantia ====
Order Amphinomida Family Euphrosinidae

- Plump bristleworms Euphrosine capensis Kinberg, 1857, (TMNP MPA). (Lüderitz to Durban)

Order Eunicida
Family Eunicidae

- Wonder worm, Bobbit worm, Eunice aphroditois (Pallas, 1788) (Lüderitz to Sodwana Bay)
- Lysidice natalensis Kinberg, 1865, (TMNP MPA). (Lüderitz to Algoa Bay)
- Estuarine wonder-worm, Marphysa haemasona Quatrefages, 1866 recorded as syn. Marphysa elityeni Lewis & Karageorgopoulos, 2008, (TMNP MPA) (Walvis Bay to Algoa Bay)

Family Lumbrineridae

- False earthworm, Lumbrineris coccinea (Renier, 1804), (TMNP MPA). (Walvis Bay to Mozambique)

Family Oenonidae

- Iridescent worm Arabella iricolor (Montagu, 1804), (TMNP MPA). (Lüderitz to Maputo)

Family Onuphidae

- Case-worm, Diopatra cuprea (Bosc, 1802), (TMNP MPA), (Walvis bay to Mozambique)
- Banded case-worm, Diopatra neapolitana Delle Chiaje, 1841 (TMNP MPA), (Walvis Bay to Maputo)

Order Phyllodocida
Family Glyceridae

- Glycerine worm, Glycera tridactyla Schmarda, 1861 (TMNP MPA) (Walvis Bay to Maputo)

Family Nephtyidae

- Nephtys' sand worms Nephtys spp. (TMNP MPA) (North Namibia to Richard's Bay)

Family Nereididae

- Perinereis capensis (Kinberg, 1865), (TMNP MPA),
- Bar-toothed nereid, Perinereis vallata (Grube, 1857) recorded as syn. Perinereis nuntia vallata (Grube, 1857),(TMNP MPA) (Walvis Bay to Mozambique)
- Dumeril's clam worm, Platynereis dumerilii (Audouin & Milne Edwards, 1833), (TMNP MPA).
- Mussel-worm, Pseudonereis variegata (Grube, 1857), (TMNP MPA). (Whole coast)
- Estuarine nereid, Simplisetia erythraeensis (Fauvel, 1918), (TMNP MPA) (Orange River to Mozambique)

Family Polynoidae

- Milky scaleworm, Antinoe lactea Day, 1953(TMNP MPA) (Cape Columbine to Cape Peninsula)
- Common scaleworm, Lepidonotus semitectus (Stimpson, 1855), (TMNP MPA) (Walvis Bay to Wild Coast)
- Two-tone scaleworm, Polynoe erythrotaenia (Schmarda, 1861) recorded as syn. Hemilepidia erythrotaenia Schmarda, 1861, (TMNP MPA) (Lüderitz to Cape Peninsula)

Family Sigalionidae

- Boa worm Sthenelais boa (Johnston, 1833), (TMNP MPA).

Family Syllidae

- Syllis variegata Grube, 1860, (TMNP MPA).
- Beadworms Syllidae spp. (Whole coast)

==== Subclass Sedentaria ====
Family Arenicolidae

- Bloodworm, Arenicola loveni Kinberg, 1866, (Cape Columbine to Durban)

Family Capitellidae

- Clubworm, Notomastus latericeus Sars, 1851, (TMNP MPA). (Orange River to Mozambique)

Family Chaetopteridae

- Chaetopterus, Chaetopterus variopedatus (Renier, 1804), (TMNP MPA) (Cape Columbine to southern Mozambique)

Family Maldanidae

- Bamboo worms, Euclymene spp. (TMNP MPA)

Family Orbiniidae

- Naineris laevigata (Grube, 1855), (TMNP MPA).
- Wooly worm, Orbinia angrapequensis (Augener, 1918) (TMNP MPA) (Walvis Bay to Algoa Bay)
- Orbinia sp. (TMNP MPA).

Family Sabellariidae

- Cape reef worms Gunnarea gaimardi (Quatrefages, 1848), also recorded as syn. Gunnarea capensis (Schmarda, 1861), (TMNP MPA). (North Namibia to North KZN)

Order Terebellida
Family Cirratulidae

- Black boring worm, Dodecaceria pulchra Day, 1955 (Lüderitz to Port Elizabeth)
- Orange thread-gilled worm, Cirriformia capensis (Schmarda, 1861) syn. Timarete capensis, Cirratulus capensis, Cirratulus australis Stimpson, 1856 (Angola to Durban)
- Tentacular cirriform polychaete, Cirriformia tentaculata (Montagu, 1808), (TMNP MPA).

Family Flabelligeridae

- Flabby bristleworm Flabelligera affinis M. Sars, 1829, (TMNP MPA) (Lüderitz to Algoa Bay)

Family Pectinariidae

- Cone-tube worm, Amphictene capensis (Pallas, 1766), recorded as syn. Pectinaria capensis (Pallas, 1766), (TMNP MPA). (Lüderitz to Cape Peninsula)

Family Terebellidae

- Sand mason, lollipop worm, Lanice conchilega Pallas, 1766 (False Bay to Port Elizabeth, also northern oceans)
- Nicolea macrobranchia (Schmarda, 1861), (TMNP MPA).
- Lobed tangleworm, Telothelepus capensis Day, 1955 (TMNP MPA)
- Tangleworms family Terebellidae Mamlgren, 1867 (whole coast)
- Tangleworms, Thelepus spp.

Order Sabellida
Family Sabellidae

- Branchiomma natalensis (Kinberg, 1866), (Lüderitz to Cape Point)
- Branchiomma violacea (Schmarda, 1861), (Walvis Bay to Durban)
- Feather-duster worm, Pseudobranchiomma longa (Kinberg, 1866) syn. Sabellastarte longa (Cape Peninsula to Mozambique)
- Gregarious fanworm, Pseudopotamilla reniformis (Muller, 1771) (Port Nolloth to southern Mozambique)
- Peacock fanworm, pencilworm, Sabella spallanzanii (Gmelin, 1791) syn. Sabella penicillus (as S. penicillus, False Bay to southern KwaZulu-Natal)
- Blue coral worm, large hydroid worm, Spirobranchus kraussii (Baird, 1864), also recorded as syn. Pomatoleios kraussii (Baird, 1864), (TMNP MPA).

Family Serpulidae

- Filigreed coral-worm, Filograna implexa Berkeley, 1835 (Port Nolloth to Port Elizabeth)
- Red fanworm, mopworm Protula bispiralis (Savigny, 1822) (Cape Point to Durban)
- Operculate fanworm, Serpula vermicularis Linnaeus, 1767 (Port Nolloth to southern Mozambique)
- Spiral fanworms family Serpulidae Rafinesque, 1815 (whole coast)
- Spiral fanworms, Spirorbis spp.

Order Spionida
Family Spionidae

- Shell-boring spionids, Polydora spp.

== Arthropods ==
=== Pycnogonida – sea spiders ===
Order Pantopoda
Family Ammotheidae

- Compact sea spider, Tanystylum brevipes (Hoek, 1881) (Orange River mouth to Richards Bay)

Family Nymphonidae

- Scarlet sea spider, Nymphon signatum Mobius, 1902 (Saldanha to East London)

Superfamily Ascorhynchoidea family incertae sedis

- Yellow sea spider, Queubus jamesanus Barnard 1946 (Cape Peninsula to Port St. Johns)

=== Crustacea ===
==== Order Amphipoda ====
Family Amaryllididae

- Pocket amphipod, Amaryllis macrophthalma Haswell, 1879, (TMNP MPA). (Walvis Bay to Mozambique)

Family Ampeliscidae

- Four-eyed amphipod, Ampelisca palmata K.H. Barnard, 1916, (TMNP MPA).

Family Caprellidae

- Skeleton shrimp, Caprella equilibra Say, 1818, (TMNP MPA), (Whole coast)

Family Cyamidae

- Whale-louse, Cyamus boopis Lütken, 1870, (TMNP MPA). (whole coast and offshore waters)

Family Cyproideidae

- Ornate amphipod, Cyproidea ornata Haswell, 1879 (Namibian coast to Kosi Bay)

Family Dexaminidae

- Sea squirt amphipod, Polycheria atolli A.O. Walker, 1905 (whole coast)

Family Hyalidae

- Apohyale diastoma (K.H. Barnard, 1916), (TMNP MPA). recorded as syn. Hyale diastoma K.H. Barnard, 1916.
- Seaweed amphipod, Apohyale grandicornis (Krøyer, 1845), (TMNP MPA). recorded as syn. Hyale grandicornis (Krøyer, 1845),

Family Hyperiidae

- Bubble-eyed amphipod, Themisto gaudichaudii Guérin, 1825, (TMNP MPA). (Orange River to Cape Peninsula)

Family Iphimediidae

- Hunchback amphipod, Iphimedia gibba Barnard, 1940 (Cape Peninsula to Port Elizabeth) (False Bay to Algoa Bay)

Family Ischyroceridae

- Hitchhiker amphipods, Jassa spp. (TMNP MPA). (whole coast)
- Jumping sand, Siphonoecetes spp.

Family Leucothoidae

- Sponge amphipod, Leucothoe spinicarpa (Abildgaard, 1789), (TMNP MPA).

Family Lysianassidae

- Compact amphipod, Lysianassa ceratina (Walker, 1889), (TMNP MPA).
- Lysianassa spp. (TMNP MPA).

Family Maeridae

- Red-striped amphipod, Ceradocus (Denticeradocus) rubromaculatus (Stimpson, 1855) recorded as alt. rep. Ceradocus rubromaculatus (Stimpson, 1855), (TMNP MPA).(whole coast)
- Maera hirondellei Chevreux, 1900, (TMNP MPA)

Family Melitidae

- Brack water amphipod, Melita zeylanica Stebbing, 1904. (TMNP MPA).

Family Ochlesidae

- Ridgeback amphipod, Ochlesis lenticulosus K.H. Barnard, 1940, (TMNP MPA). (False Bay to Algoa Bay)

Family Phoxocephalidae

- Spade-foot amphipod, Griffithsius latipes (Griffiths, 1976), (TMNP MPA) (Luderitz to Cape Peninsula)

Family Phronimidae

- Pram bug amphipod, Phronima sedentaria (Forskål, 1775), (TMNP MPA). (St Helena Bay to north KZN)

Family Pontogeneiidae

- Paramoera bidentata K.H. Barnard, 1932, (TMNP MPA). (Whole coast)
- Big-eyed amphipod, Paramoera capensis (Dana, 1853), (TMNP MPA). (Whole coast)

Family Talitridae

- Sand hopper Africorchestia quadrispinosa (K.H. Barnard, 1916), (TMNP MPA).
- Beach hopper, louse amphipod, Capeorchestia capensis (Dana, 1853). also recorded as syn. Talorchestia capensis (Dana, 1853), (Orange river to Wild Coast) (TMNP MPA).

Family Urothoidae

- Burrowing amphipod, Urothoe grimaldii Chevreux, 1895, (TMNP MPA). (North Namibia to Algoa Bay)

==== Order Cumacea ====
Family Bodotriidae

- Cumopsis africanum (Zimmer, 1920) recorded as syn. Heterocuma africanum Zimmer, 1920.

==== Order Decapoda ====
===== Infraorder Achelata =====
Family Palinuridae

- West Coast rock lobster, Jasus lalandii (H. Milne-Edwards, 1837) (Walvis Bay to Port Elizabeth)

Family Scyllaridae

- Shoveller crayfish, cape slipper lobster, Scyllarides elisabethae (Ortmann, 1894), (TMNP MPA). (False Bay to north KZN)

===== Infraorder Anomura – hermit crabs =====
Family Diogenidae

- Blue-antenna hermit, Areopaguristes engyops (Barnard, 1947), (TMNP MPA).
- Striated hermit crab, Dardanus arrosor (Herbst, 1796) (False Bay to southern Mozambique)
- Common sand hermit, Diogenes brevirostris Stimpson, 1858, (TMNP MPA).
- Pink hermit crab, Paguristes gamianus (H. Milne-Edwards, 1836) (southern Namibia to Port Elizabeth)

Superfamily Galatheoidea

- Squat lobster, Galatheoidea sp.(TMNP MPA)

Family Paguridae

- Blue-striped hermit crab, blue faced hermit crab, Pagurus liochele (Barnard, 1947) (False Bay to Port Elizabeth).
- Blue-lined hermit crab, Anapagurus hendersoni Barnard, 1947. (TMNP MPA)

===== Infraorder Axiidea =====
Family Callichiridae

- Common sand prawn, Kraussillichirus kraussi (Stebbing, 1900) recorded as syn. Callichirus kraussi (Stebbing, 1900), (TMNP MPA).

===== Infraorder Brachyura – true crabs =====
Family Calappidae

- Masked crab, Mursia cristiata H. Milne-Edwards, 1837 (Saldanha Bay to Sodwana Bay) synonym Mursia cristimanus

Fanuly Camptandriidae

- Danielella edwardsii (MacLeay, 1838) recorded as syn. Danielita edwardsii (MacLeay, 1838), (TMNP MPA).

Family Dromiidae

- Sumo crab, scrubbing-brush crab, Dromidia aegibotus Barnard, 1947 (Cape Peninsula to Port Elizabeth)
- Shaggy sponge crab, Dromidia hirsutissima (Lamarck, 1818) (Southern Namibia to Mossel Bay)
- Cryptic sponge crab, Platydromia spongiosa (Stimpson, 1858) (Namibian border to Sodwana Bay) syn. Cryptodromiopsis spongiosa
- Furred sponge crab, cloaked sponge crab, Pseudodromia latens Stimpson, 1858 (Saldanha Bay to East London)

Family Epialtidae

- Toothed decorator crab, Acanthonyx dentatus H. Milne Edwards, 1834 recorded as syn. Dehaanius dentatus (H. Milne-Edwards, 1834) (Saldanha Bay to Richards Bay)
- Agulhas spider crab, Maja capensis (Ortmann, 1894) (False Bay to Port Elizabeth) syn. Mamaia capensis (not listed on WoRMS, possibly Maja cornuta (Linnaeus, 1758) reported as syn. Maja squinado var. capensis Ortmann, 1894)

Family Grapsidae

- Columbus crab, gulfweed crab, Planes minutus (Linnaeus, 1758), (TMNP MPA).

Family Hexapodidae

- Three-legged crab, Spiroplax spiralis (Barnard, 1950), (TMNP MPA).

Family Hymenosomatidae

- Crown crab, Hymenosoma orbiculare Desmarest, 1825 (Namibian border to southern Mozambique)

Family Inachidae

- Cape long-legged spider crab, Macropodia falcifera (Stimpson, 1857) (cape Peninsula to East London)
- Hotlips spider crab, Achaeopsis spinulosa Stimpson, 1857 (False Bay to Durban)

Family Leucosiidae

- Long-legged crab, Afrophila punctata (Bell, 1855), (TMNP MPA).

Family Nautilocorystidae

- Masked crab, Nautilocorystes ocellatus (Gray, 1831), (TMNP MPA).

Family Ovalipidae

- Three-spot swimming crab, Ovalipes trimaculatus (De Haan, 1833) (Lüderitz to Durban)

Family Pilumnoididae

- Kelp crab, Pilumnoides rubus Guinot & MacPherson, 1987 (Namibian border to Cape Peninsula)

Family Pinnotheridae

- Pea crab, Afropinnotheres dofleini (Lenz in Lenz & Strunck, 1914) recorded as syn. Pinnotheres dofleini Lenz in Lenz & Strunck, 1914, (TMNP MPA).

Family Plagusiidae

- Cape rock crab, Guinusia chabrus (Linnaeus, 1758) (Lüderitz to Sodwana Bay) also reported as syn. Plagusia chabrus

Family Portulinidae

- Smith’s swimming crab, Charybdis (Archias) smithii Macleay, 1838, recorded as alt. rep. Charybdis smithii Macleay, 1838, (TMNP MPA).

Family Varunidae

- Shore crab, Cyclograpsus punctatus H. Milne Edwards, 1837, (TMNP MPA).
- Swimming rock crab, Varuna litterata (Fabricius, 1798), (TMNP MPA).

===== Infraorder Caridea – benthic prawns =====
Family Alpheidae

- Cracker shrimp, Alpheus lobidens De Haan, 1849 Alpheus crassimanus Heller, 1865 (Saldanha Bay to Delagoa Bay)
- Cracker shrimp, Alpheus sulcatus Kingsley, 1878, recorded as syn. Alpheus macrochirus Richters, 1880, (TMNP MPA).
- Commensal shrimp, Betaeus jucundus Barnard, 1947, (TMNP MPA).

Family Hippolytidae

- Crinoid shrimp, feather star shrimp Hippolyte catagrapha d'Udekem d'Acoz, 2007 (False Bay)
- Broken-backed shrimp, Hippolyte kraussiana Stimpson, 1860 (Saldanha Bay to East London)

Family Palaemonidae

- Sand shrimp, Palaemon peringueyi (Macpherson, 1990) (Walvis Bay to Port St Johns)

Family Penaeidae

- Surf shrimp, swimming shrimp, Macropetasma africana (Balss, 1913), (TMNP MPA).

===== Infraorder Gebiidea =====
Family Upogebiidae

- Estuarine mud prawn, Upogebia africana (Ortmann, 1894), (TMNP MPA).

==== Order Euphausiacea ====
Family Euphausiidae

- Light euphausid, Euphausia lucens Hansen, 1905, (TMNP MPA). (Angola to Algoa Bay)

==== Order Isopoda ====
Family Anthuridae

- Apanthura sandalensis Stebbing, 1900, (TMNP MPA).
- Haliophasma spp. (TMNP MPA).
- Slender chequered isopod, Mesanthura catenula (Stimpson, 1855) (Lamberts Bay to KwaZulu-Natal)

Family Cirolanidae

- Cirolana cranchii Leach, 1818, (TMNP MPA),
- Crimped cirolanid, Cirolana undulata Barnard, 1914, (TMNP MPA).
- Crimped cirolanid, Cirolana venusticauda Stebbing, 1902, (TMNP MPA).
- Right-angled beach louse, Eurydice kensleyi Bruce & Soares, 1996 (TMNP MPA).
- Wide-foot beach louse, Excirolana latipes (Barnard, 1914), (TMNP MPA)
- Natal beach louse, Excirolana natalensis (Vanhöffen, 1914), (TMNP MPA).
- Hairy-legged cirolanid, Natalolana hirtipes (H. Milne Edwards, 1840), (TMNP MPA).

Family Cymothoidae

- Fish louse, Anilocra capensis Leach, 1818 (Walvis Bay to Durban)

Family Holidoteidae

- Austroarcturus dayi (Kensley, 1977) recorded as Microarcturus dayi Kensley, 1977.

Family Idoteidae

- Keeled isopod, Glyptidotea lichtensteini (Krauss, 1843), (TMNP MPA).
- Metallic isopod, Idotea metallica Bosc, 1801, (TMNP MPA).
- Reticulate kelp louse, Paridotea reticulata Barnard, 1914 (Namibian border to Cape Peninsula)
- Green weed-louse, Paridotea ungulata (Pallas, 1772), (TMNP MPA).
- Paridotea spp. (TMNP MPA).

Family Janiridae

- Iais pubescens (Dana, 1853),(TMNP MPA)
- Ianiropsis palpalis Barnard, 1914 (TMNP MPA)
- Hairy isopod, Iathrippa capensis (Barnard, 1914), (TMNP MPA).

Family Joeropsididae

- Stebbing's isopod, Joeropsis stebbingi Kensley, 1975, (TMNPA MPA).

Family Ligiidae

- Sea slater, Ligia dilatata Brandt, 1833, (TMNP MPA).

Family Paranthuridae

- Paranthura punctata (Stimpson, 1855), (TMNP MPA).

Family Sphaeromatidae

- Hump-tailed isopod, Cymodoce valida (Stebbing, 1902), (TMNP MPA).
- Cymodocella spp. (TMNP MPA).
- Roll-tailed isopod, Dynamenella dioxus Barnard, 1914 (TMNP MPA)
- Roll-tailed isopod Dynamenella huttoni (TMNP MPA).
- Dynamenella spp. (TMNP MPA).
- Spherical isopod, Exosphaeroma spp. (whole Namibian coast to cape Peninsula)
- Exosphaeroma antikraussi Barnard, 1940, (TMNP MPA).
- Exosphaeroma kraussi Tattersall, 1913, (TMNP MPA).
- Exosphaeroma planum Barnard, 1914, (TMNP MPA).
- Exosphaeroma truncatitelson Barnard, 1940, (TMNP MPA).
- Variegated spherical isopod, Exosphaeroma varicolor Barnard, 1914, (TMNP MPA).
- Exosphaeroma spp. (TMNP MPA).
- Roll-tailed isopod, Ischyromene australis (Richardson, 1906) recorded as syn. Dynamenella australis Richardson, 1906 (TMNP MPA).
- Roll-tailed isopod, Ischyromene huttoni (G. Thomson, 1879), (TMNP MPA).
- Roll-tailed isopod, Ischyromene magna (Barnard, 1954), recorded as syn. Cymodocella magna Barnard, 1954, (TMNP MPA).
- Spike-back isopod, Parisocladus perforatus (H. Milne Edwards, 1840), (TMNP MPA).
- Spike-back isopod, Parisocladus stimpsoni (Heller, 1861), (TMNP MPA).
- Button isopod, Sphaeramene polytylotos Barnard, 1914, (TMNP MPA).

Family Tylidae

- Pill-bug Tylos capensis Krauss, 1843 (TMNP MPA).
- Giant beach pill-bug, Tylos granulatus Krauss, 1843, (TMNP MPA).

==== Order Leptostraca ====
Family Nebaliidae

- Cape leaf shrimp, Nebalia capensis Barnard, 1914, (TMNP MPA).

==== Order Mysida – mysid shrimps ====
Family Mysidae

- Surf mysid, Gastrosaccus psammodytes O. Tattersall, 1958 (Namibian border to Durban)
- Red and white shrimp, Heteromysis (Heteromysis) fosteri Wittmann & Griffiths, 2017 (TMNP MPA)
- Octopus commensal shrimp, Heteromysis (Heteromysis) octopodis Wittmann & Griffiths, 2017 (TMNP MPA)
- Kelp mysid, Mysidopsis major (Zimmer, 1928) (Lüderitz to False Bay)
- Stargazer shrimp, Mysidopsis zsilaveczi Wittmann & Griffiths, 2014, (TMNP MPA)

==== Order Stomatopoda – mantis shrimps ====
Family Lysiosquillidae

- Cape mantis shrimp, Lysiosquilla capensis Hansen, 1895 (Cape Point to Port Elizabeth) Also reported as Lysiosquilla (armata) capensis not listed on WoRMS. (Walvis Bay to KZN south coast)

==== Order Tanaidacea ====
Family Leptocheliidae

- Leptochelia barnardi Brown, 1957. (TMNP MPA)

Family Tanaididae

- Slender tanaid, Zeuxoides helleri Sieg, 1980, recorded as syn. Anatanais gracilis (Heller, 1865), (TMNP MPA).

==== Infraclass Cirripedia – barnacles ====
Order Balanomorpha
Family Balanidae

- Striped barnacle, Amphibalanus amphitrite (Darwin, 1854), (TMNP MPA).
- Giant barnacle, Austromegabalanus cylindricus (Gmelin, 1780), (TMNP MPA).
- ? Balanus maxillaris Gronovius, 1763, (not listed in WoRMS), (TMNP MPA).
- ? Balanus algicola (not isted in WoRMS), possibly Notomegabalanus algicola Pilsbry, 1916, (TMNP MPA).

Family Coronulidae

- Whale barnacle, Coronula diadema (Linnaeus, 1767) reported as Coonula diadema (misspelling) (TMNP MPA).

Family Tetraclitidae

- Grey volcano barnacle, Tetraclita serrata Darwin, 1854 (TMNP MPA).

Order Scalpellomorpha
Family Lepadidae

- Rabbit-ear barnacle, Conchoderma auritum (Linnaeus, 1767), (TMNP MPA).
- Buoy barnacle, Dosima fascicularis (Ellis & Solander, 1786) (TMNP MPA)
- Yellow-rimmed goose barnacle, Lepas (Lepas) anatifera Linnaeus, 1758, reported as Lepas anatifera Linnaeus, 1758, (TMNP MPA).
- Goose barnacle, Lepas (Lepas) testudinata Aurivillius, 1892 (pelagic)

Order Sessilia

Family Balanidae

- Giant barnacle, Austromegabalanus cylindricus (Gmelin, 1780) (Port Nolloth to Port Elizabeth)
- White dwarf barnacle, Notomegabalanus algicola (Pilsbry, 1916) (Namibia to Port St Johns)
- Striped barnacle, Amphibalanus amphitrite (Darwin, 1854) recorded as syn. Balanus amphitrite Darwin, 1854 (Saldanha Bay to Mozambique)

Family Chthamalidae

- Tooth barnacle, Chthamalus dentatus Krauss, 1848, (TMNP MPA).
- Eight-shell barnacle, Octomeris angulosa (Sowerby, 1825), (TMNP MPA).

=== Class Copepoda ===
Order Calanoida
Family Centropagidae

- Pelagic copepods, Centropages brachiatus (Dana, 1849), (TMNP MPA).

Order Harpacticoida
Family Porcellidiidae

- Porcellidium spp. (TMNP MPA).

=== Class Hexapoda ===
Family Neanuridae

- Seashore springtail, Anurida maritima (Guérin-Méneville, 1836), (TMNP MPA).

== Bryozoans – moss animals, lace animals ==
Order Cheilostomatida
Family Adeonidae

- Forked false coral, Adeonella spp. (Namibian border to Durban)
- Large pore lacy false coral, Adeonellopsis meandrina (O'Donoghue & de Watteville, 1944), (TMNP MPA)
- Pore-plated false coral, Laminopora jellyae (Levinsen, 1909) (Cape Peninsula to East London)

Family Beaniidae

- Magellanic lace animal, Beania magellanica (Busk, 1852) (Cape Peninsula to East London)
- Beania vanhoeffeni Kluge, 1914 (Cape Peninsula)
- Beania minuspina Florence, Hayward & Gibbons, 2007 (Cape Peninsula)

Family Bugulidae

- Eyelash moss animal, bonsai bush, Bicellariella bonsai Florence, Hayward & Gibbons, 2007 (Port Nolloth to Port St Johns)
- Eyelash moss animal, Bicellariella ciliata (Linnaeus, 1758), (TMNP MPA).
- Fouling moss animal, Bugula neritina (Linnaeus, 1758) (Olifants River to Sodwana Bay, Almost worldwide)
- Tree moss animal, Bugula plumosa (Pallas, 1766) (Both sides of the Cape Peninsula, Great Britain)
- Bird's head moss animal, Bugulina avicularia (Linnaeus, 1758) (Cape Peninsula to Durban). reported as Bugula avicularia.
- Fan-shaped moss animal, Bugulina flabellata (Thompson, in Gray, 1848) (Namibian border to Algoa Bay), recorded as syn. Bugula flabellata
- Tree moss animal, Crisularia plumosa (Pallas, 1766), (TMNP MPA).
- Dentate moss animal, Virididentula dentata (Lamouroux, 1816) (Cape Peninsula to Sodwana Bay, Indo-Pacific and Brazil), recorded as syn. Bugula dentata

Family Calwelliidae

- Busk's moss animal, Onchoporella bombycina Busk, 1884, recorded as syn. Onchoporella buskii (Harmer, 1923) (Port Nolloth to Algoa Bay, endemic)

Family Candidae

- Fern moss animal, curled moss animal, Menipea crispa (Pallas, 1766) (Lambert's Bay to Durban)
- Fan-shaped moss animal, Menipea ornata (Busk, 1852), (TMNP MPA).
- Spiral moss animal, Menipea triseriata Busk, 1852 (Namibian border to Port St Johns)

Family Celleporidae

- Spiny false-coral, Celleporaria capensis (O'Donoghue & de Watteville, 1935), (TMNP MPA).
- Cylindrical false coral, Turbicellepora redoutei (Audouin, 1826) syn. Cellepora cylindriformis (Port Nolloth to Port St. Johns)
- Cylindrical false coral, Turbicellepora cylindriformis (Busk, 1881), (TMNP MPA).
- Cylindrical false coral, Turbicellepora valligera Hayward & Cook, 1983, (TMNP MPA).

Family Chaperiidae

- Scrolled false coral, Chaperia spp. (Namibian border to Sodwana Bay)
- Maroon scrolled false coral, Chaperiopsis multifida (Busk, 1884), (TMNP MPA)

Family Electridae

- Verticellate lace animal, Hairy lace animal, Electra pilosa (Linnaeus, 1767) (Namibian border to East London)

Family Exochellidae

- Escharoides contorta (Busk, 1854) (Cape Town to KwaZulu-Natal)
- Encrusting bryozoan, Escharoides spp. (TMNP MPA).

Family Flustridae

- Leafy moss animal, Flustra spp. (Both sides of Cape Peninsula. North Atlantic)

Family Gigantoporidae

- Staghorn false coral, Gephyrophora polymorpha Busk, 1884 recorded as syn. Gigantopora polymorpha (Busk, 1884) (Port Nolloth to Cape Infanta)

Family Lanceoporidae

- Calyptotheca nivea (Busk, 1884) (Cape Point to East London)
- Calyptotheca porelliformis (Waters, 1918), (TMNP MPA)

Family Lepraliellidae

- Spiny false coral, Celleporaria capensis (O'Donoghue & de Watteville, 1935) (Cape Peninsula to Algoa Bay)

Family Margarettidae

- Cactus-bush brryozoan, Margaretta levinseni (Canu & Bassler, 1930) (Cape Peninsula to Port Elizabeth)

Family Membraniporidae

- Membranous lace animal, Jellyella tuberculata (Bosc, 1802) (Saldanha Bay to Durban) syn. Membranipora tuberculata
- Rectangular membranous lace animal, Rustic lace animal, Membranipora rustica Florence, Hayward & Gibbons, 2007 (Namibian border to Durban)

Family Phidoloporidae

- Lacy false coral, Schizoretepora tessellata (Hincks, 1878) (Namibian border to Mossel Bay and Australia)

Family Steginoporellidae

- Steginoporella buskii Harmer, 1900 (Port Nolloth to Durban)

Family Watersiporidae

- Sub-ovoid bryozoan, Watersipora cucullata (Busk, 1854), recorded as syn. Watersipora subovoidea (d'Orbigny, 1852) (Namibian border to Sodwana Bay)
- Red-rust bryozoan Watersipora subtorquata (d'Orbigny, 1852) (Cape Columbine to Mossel Bay)

Order Ctenostomatida
Family Alcyonidiidae

- Nodular bryozoan, Alcyonidium nodosum O'Donoghue & Watteville, 1944 (Port Nolloth to False Bay)
- Soft false coral, Alcyonidium rhomboidale O'Donoghue, 1924 (Cape Columbine to Algoa Bay)

Order Cyclostomatida
Family Diaperoeciidae

- Beauteous bryozoan, pore-tubed bryozoan, Nevianipora pulcherrima (Kirkpatrick, 1890) syn. Tubulipora pulcherrima (Cape Peninsula to Mossel Bay, Indo-Pacific)

Family Tubuliporidae

- Tennysonia stellata Busk, 1867, (TMNP MPA).

== Molluscs ==
=== Gastropoda – slugs and snails ===
==== Patellogastropoda – true limpets ====
Family Patellidae – true limpets

- Kelp limpet, Cymbula compressa (Linnaeus, 1758) recorded as syn. Patella compressa Linnaeus. 1758 (Namibia to Cape Point)
- Granite limpet, Cymbula granatina (Linnaeus, 1758), also recorded as syn. Patella granatina Linnaeus, 1758 (Namibia to Cape Agulhas)
- Pink rayed limpet, cinnabar limpet, Cymbula miniata (Born, 1778) recorded as syn. Patella miniata Born, 1778 (Namibia to Eastern Cape)
- Goat's eye limpet, Cymbula oculus (Born, 1778) recorded as syn. Patella oculus Born, 1778 (Cape Columbine to KwaZulu-Natal south coast)
- Variable limpet. Helcion concolor (Krauss, 1848).
- Slim rayed-limpet, Helcion dunkeri Krauss, 1848 (Namibia to KwaZulu-Natal)
- Prickly limpet, Helcion pectunculus (Gmelin, 1791) (Namibia to central KwaZulu-Natal)
- Rayed limpet, broad-rayed limpet, Helcion pruinosus Krauss, 1848 (Cape Columbine to central KwaZulu-Natal)
- Argenville's limpet, Scutellastra argenvillei Krauss, 1848 (Namibia to KwaZulu-Natal south coast) (syn. Patella argenvillei)
- Bearded limpet, Scutellastra barbara Linnaeus, 1758 (Orange River to central KwaZulu-Natal) (syn, Patella barbara).
- Pear limpet, spoon limpet, Scutellastra cochlear Born, 1778 (Orange River to KwaZulu-Natal south coast) recorded as syn. Patella cochlear
- Granular limpet, Scutellastra granularis Linnaeus, 1758 (Namibia to KwaZulu-Natal north coast) (syn. Patella granularis)
- Duck's foot or Long-spined limpet, Scutellastra longicosta Lamarck, 1819 (Cape Point to central KwaZulu-Natal) also recorded as syn. Patella longicosta.
- Giant limpet, Scutellastra tabularis Krauss, 1848 (Cape Point to KwaZulu-Natal south coast) (syn. Patella tabularis).

==== Vetigastropoda ====
Family Calliostomatidae

- Ornate topshell, Calliostoma ornatum (Lamarck, 1822), (TMNP MPA).

Family Haliotidae – abalone

- Perlemoen or abalone, Haliotis midae Linnaeus, 1758 (Cape Columbine to KwaZulu-Natal South coast)
- Spiral-ridged siffie, Haliotis parva Linnaeus, 1758 (Cape Point to Eastern Cape)
- Siffie or Venus ear, blood-spotted abalone, Haliotis spadicea Donovan, E., 1808 (Cape Point to KwaZulu-Natal north coast)

Family Fissurellidae – keyhole limpets

- Saddle-shaped keyhole limpet, Dendrofissurella scutellum (Gmelin, 1791) also recorded as syn. Amblychilepas scutella (Gmelin, 1791) (Namibia to northern KwaZulu-Natal)
- Conical keyhole limpet, Diodora parviforata (G.B. Sowerby III, 1889) (Orange River to Eastern Cape) also recorded as syn. Fissurella parviforata G.B. Sowerby III, 1889.
- Diodora elevata (Dunker, 1846) (Saldanha Bay to western Transkei)
- Cape keyhole limpet, Fissurella mutabilis Sowerby, 1834 (Orange River to Eastern Cape)
- Mantled keyhole limpet, Pupillaea aperta (G.B. Sowerby I, 1825) (Orange River to KwaZulu-Natal south coast) also recorded as syn. Fissurellidea aperta G.B. Sowerby, 1825.

Family Phasianellidae

- Knobbly dogwhelk, Tricolia capensis (Dunker, 1846), (TMNP MPA).
- Pheasant shell, Tricolia neritina (Dunker, 1846), (TMNP MPA).
- Tricolia sp. (TMNP MPA),

Family Trochidae

- Cape topshell, Gibbula capensis (Gmelin, 1791), (TMNP MPA).
- Multicoloured topshell, Gibbula multicolor (Krauss, 1848), (TMNP MPA).
- Variegated topshell, Oxystele antoni D. G. Herbert, 2015, also recorded as syn. Oxystele variegata (Anton, 1838), (TMNP MPA).
- Pink-lipped topshell, Oxystele sinensis (Gmelin, 1791), (TMNP MPA).
- Tiger topshell, Oxystele tigrina (Dillwyn, 1817), (TMNP MPA).
- Variegated topshell, Oxystele impervia (Menke, 1843), (TMNP MPA).

Family Turbinidae

- Smooth and ridged turban shells, Turbo cidaris Gmelin, 1791, (TMNP MPA).
- Alikreukel, Turbo sarmaticus Linnaeus, 1758, (TMNP MPA).

==== Caenogastropoda ====
Family Epitoniidae

- Wentletrap sea snail, Epitonium kraussi (Nyst, 1873), (TMNP MPA).

Family Janthinidae

- Bubble raft shell or violet snail, Janthina janthina Linnaeus, 1758 (Cape Columbine to Mozambique)

Family Turritellidae

- Waxy screw shell, Turritella capensis (Krauss, 1848)(Namibia to Eastern Cape) also recorded as syn. Protoma (Protomella) capensis.
- Threaded screw-shell, Turritella carinifera Lamarck, 1799 (Western Cape to southern Mozambique)
- Pale screw shell, Turritella sanguinea Reeve, 1849 (Cape Point to Natal)

===== Littorinimorpha =====
Family Aporrhaidae – pelican foot shells

- Aporrhais pesgallinae Barnard, 1963 (Namibia and Western Cape)

Family Assimineidae

- Globular mud snail, Assiminea globulus Connoly, 1939 (Cape Columbine to Eastern Cape)

Family Calyptraeidae – slipper limpets

- Bostrycapulus aculeatus (Gmelin, 1791) recorded as syn. Crepidula aculeata (Gmelin, 1791) (Namibia to KwaZulu-Natal)
- Crepipatella dilatata (Lamarck, 1822), recorded as syn. Crepidula dilatata Lamarck, 1822 (Lambert's Bay to Mossel Bay)
- Slipper limpet, Crepidula porcellana (Linnaeus, 1758) (Namibia to KwaZulu-Natal north coast)
- Chinese hat Calyptraea chinensis (Linnaeus, 1758) (Namibia to Transkei)

Family Cassidae – helmet shells

- Helmet shell, Semicassis labiata zeylanica (Lamarck, 1822) (Cape Point to northern KwaZulu-Natal) also recorded as syn. Phalium labiatum zeylanicum.

Family Charoniidae

- Pink lady, Charonia lampas Linnaeus, 1758, also recorded as Charonia lampas pustulata (Cape Point to Mozambique)

Family Cymatiidae

- Pustular triton, Argobuccinum pustulosum (Lightfoot, 1786), (Orange River to Eastern Cape)
- Furry ridged triton, Cabestana africana Adams A. 1855 (also as Cabestana cutacea africana Namibia to southern Mozambique)

Family Cypraeidae – true cowries

- Cypraeovula algoensis (J. E. Gray, 1825), (TMNP MPA).
- Cypraeovula castanea (Higgins, 1868) (False Bay to East London)
- Cypraeovula coronata (F. A. Schilder, 1930), (TMNP MPA).
- Dark-toothed cowrie, Cypraeovula fuscodentata (J. E. Gray, 1825) recorded as syn. Cypraea fuscodentata Gray, 1825 (Cape Point to Tsitsikamma)
- Cypraeovula fuscorubra (H. Shaw, 1909), recorded as syn. Cypraea fuscorubra Shaw, 1909 (Namaqualand to Cape Agulhas)
- Cypraeovula iutsui Shikama, 1974 recorded as syn. Cypraea iutsui (Olifants River Mouth to Port Alfred))

Family Hipponicidae – hoof limpets

- Horse's hoof, Sabia conica (Schumacher, 1817), recorded as syn. Hipponix conicus (Schumacher, 1817), (Cape Point to Mozambique)

Family Littorinidae

- African periwinkle, Afrolittorina africana (R. A. Philippi, 1847), recorded as syn. Nodilittorina africana (Philippi, 1847), (Namibia to northern KwaZulu-Natal)
- Southern periwinkle, Afrolittorina knysnaensis (R. A. Philippi, 1847), (TMNP MPA)

Family Naticidae – necklace shells

- Mottled necklace shell, Tectonatica tecta (Anton, 1838), recoerded as syn. Natica tecta Anton, 1839 (Namibia to Eastern Cape)

Family Ranellidae

- Single-ridged triton, Ranella gemmifera Euthyme, 1889 also recorded as syn.Ranella australasia gemmifera (Cape Point to Durban)

Family Tonnidae

- South African variegated tun, Tonna variegata (Lamarck, 1822), (TMNP MPA).

Family Triviidae – trivia

- Triviella magnidentata (Liltved, 1986) syn. Trivia magnidentata (Cape Town to East London)
- West coast baby's toes, Triviella millardi (C. N. Cate, 1979), nomen dubium (recorded as Trivia millardi Cape west coast) (Cape Agulhas and north)
- Triviella neglecta Schilder, 1930 (Cape Peninsula, Cape Agulhas and north (?)) syn. Trivia neglecta
- Baby's toes, Triviella ovulata (Lamarck, 1810), also recorded as Trivia ovulata (Cape Point to south Transkei)
- Triviella sanctispiritus (Shikama, 1974) (Cape Town to East London) syn. Trivia sanctispiritus

Family Velutinidae

- ?Lamellaria (s.l.) capensis Bergh, 1907 (Cape Point and north (?))
- ?Lamellaria (s.l.) leptoconcha Bergh, 1907 (Cape Point and north (?))
- Lamellaria perspicua Linnaeus, 1758 (Cape Point and north (?))

Family Vermetidae – worm shells

- Colonial worm shell, Dendropoma corallinaceum (Tomlin, 1939) (Orange river to Transkei) also recorded as syn. Vermetus (Stoa) corallinaceus Tomlin, 1939.
- Solitary worm shell, Thylacodes natalensis Mörch, 1862, recorded as syn. Serpulorbis natalensis (Mörch, 1862), (Namaqualand to central Kwa-Zulu-Natal)

===== Neogastropoda =====
Family Ancillariidae

- Amalda obesa (G. B. Sowerby II, 1859), (TMNP MPA).

Family Babyloniidae

- Spotted babylon, woven whelk, Zemiropsis papillaris (G.B. Sowerby I, 1825), (False Bay to eastern Transkei)

Family Buccinidae

- Flame-patterned burnupena, Burnupena catarrhacta Gmelin, 1791 (Orange river to Agulhas)
- Ridged burnupena, Burnupena cincta Röding, 1798 (Namibia to Transkei)
- Variable burnupena, Burnupena lagenaria Lamarck, 1822 (Saldanha to Zululand)
- Papery burnupena, Burnupena papyracea Bruguière, 1792 (Orange river to Agulhas)
- Burnupena pubescens Küster, 1858 (North western Cape to Durban)

Family (unassigned), superfamily Buccinoidea

- Elongate whelk, Afrocominella capensis simoniana (Petit de la Saussaye, 1852). also recorded as syn. Afrocominella elongata (Dunker, 1857), (TMNP MPA).

Family Columbellidae

- Dove snail, well-ribbed dovesnail, Anachis kraussii (G. B. Sowerby I, 1844), (TMNP MPA).

Family Conidae – cone shells

- Algoa cone, Conus algoensis G. B. Sowerby II, 1834 (Cape Columbine to Cape Agulhas)
  - Conus algoensis algoensis (West Coast)
  - Yellow Algoa cone, Conus algoensis simplex G. B. Sowerby II, 1858 (Cape Point to Hermanus)
- Elongate cone, Conus mozambicus Hwass in Bruguière, 1792 (Orange river to Eastern Cape)

Family Cystiscidae

- Gibberula dulcis (E. A. Smith, 1904). (TMNP MPA).

Family Fasciolariidae

- Short-siphoned whelk, Lugubrilaria lugubris (A. Adams & Reeve, 1847) (Saldanha to False Bay) (syn? Pleuroploca lugubris lugubris (Adams, A. & L.A. Reeve in Reeve, L.A., 1847)), Fasciolaria lugubris lugubris
- Long-siphoned whelk, Africofusus ocelliferus (Lamarck, 1816), recorded as syn. Fusinus ocelliferus Lamarck, 1816 (Namaqualand to central KwaZulu-Natal)

Family Marginellidae – marginellas

- Marginella confortini Bozzetti, 1992, (TMNP MPA).
- Marginella diadochus A. Adams & Reeve, 1850, (TMNP MPA).
- Marginella falsebayensis J. H. Veldsman & S. G. Veldsman, 2012, (TMNP MPA).
- Marginella fishhoekensis Massier, 2004, (TMNP MPA).
- Marginella houtbaaiensis S. G. Veldsman, 2013, (TMNP MPA).
- Marginella musica Hinds, 1844 (Lüderitz to Cape Agulhas)
- Cloudy marginella, Marginella nebulosa Bolten in Röding, P.F., 1798 (Cape Point to Eastern Cape)
- Marginella peelae Bozzetti, 1993, recorded as syn. Marginella beltmani Hart, 1993, (TMNP MPA).
- Sandy marginella, Marginella piperata Hinds, 1844 (Cape Point to KwaZulu-Natal north coast)
- Pinch lipped marginella, Marginella rosea Lamarck, 1822 (Cape Columbine to Cape Agulhas)
- Marginella san S. G. Veldsman, 2014, (TMNP MPA).
- Marginella textilis S. G. Veldsman & J. H. Veldsman, 2014, (TMNP MPA).
- Cape marginella, Prunum capense (Krauss, 1848), reported as syn. Volvarina capensis Krauss, 1848 (Namibia to Cape Hangklip)
- Banded volvarina, banded marginella, zoned marginella, Volvarina zonata (Kiener, 1841) (Saldanha Bay to Port Elizabeth)

Family Mitridae – mitres

- Brown mitre, Isara picta (Reeve, 1844), recorded as syn. Mitra picta Reeve, 1844 (Cape Columbine to KwaZulu-Natal south coast)

Family Muricidae

- Rock snail, Indothais dubia (Schepman, 1919), Also reported as syn. Thaisella dubia (Schepman, 1919) (TMNP MPA).
- Common dogwhelk, Nucella dubia (Krauss, 1848) (Namibia to Transkei)
- Scaly dogwhelk, Nucella squamosa (Lamarck, 1816) (Namibia to Transkei)
- Nucella wahlbergi (Krauss, 1848), recorded as syn. Thais wahlbergi (Krauss 1848). (Saldanha to False Bay)
- Stag shell, Poropteron graagae (Coen, 1947), recorded as syn. Pteropurpura (Poropteron) graagae (Coen, 1947) (Eastern Cape to northern KwaZulu-Natal)
- Hooked murex, Poropteron uncinarius (Lamarck, 1822), recorded as syn. Pteropurpurea (Poropteron) uncinaria (Lamarck, 1822), and Pteropurpura uncinaria (Lamarck, 1822), (Namibia to Port Alfred)
- Girdled dogwhelk, Trochia cingulata (Linnaeus, 1771), recorded as syn. Nucella cingulata Linnaeus, 1771 (Orange river to Cape Point)
- Fenestrate oyster drill, Vaughtia fenestrata (A. Gould, 1860), recorded as syn. Ocenebra fenestrata Gould, 1833 (Cape Point to Transkei)

Family Nassariidae

Dogwhelks

- Cape dogwhelk, Nassarius capensis R. W. Dunker, 1846 (Cape Columbine to Transkei)
- Tick shell, Nassarius kraussianus (Dunker, R.W., 1846) (Namaqualand to Mozambique)
- Nassarius niveus (A. Adams, 1852), recorded as syn. Nassarius plicatellus (A. Adams, 1852), (TMNP MPA).
- Purple-lipped dogwhelk, Nassarius speciosus (Adams, A., 1852) (Orange river to Transkei)
- Football snail, Demoulia abbreviata (Gmelin, 1791), (TMNP MPA).

Subfamily Bulliinae – Plough shells

- Annulated plough shell, Bullia annulata Lamarck, 1816 (Cape Columbine to Mozambique)
- Finger plough shell, Bullia digitalis (Dillwyn, L.W., 1817) (Namibia to Transkei)
- Fat plough shell, Bullia laevissima (Gmelin, 1791) (Namibia to Transkei)
- Pure plough shell, Bullia pura Melvill, J.C., 1885 (Cape Point to central KwaZulu-Natal)
- Smooth plough shell, Bullia rhodostoma Reeve, L.A., 1847 (Cape Point to North KwaZulu-Natal)
- Bullia tenuis Reeve, 1846, (TMNP MPA),

Family Clavatulidae

- Ribbed turrid, Clionella sinuata Born, 1778 (Namibia to Eastern Cape)
- Ribbed turrid, Clionella rosaria (Cape Point to KwaZulu-Natal)

==== Heterobranchia ====
Order Ellobiida
Family Trimusculidae

- Congregating limpet, Trimusculus sp. (TMNP MPA).

Order Systellommatophora Family Onchidiidae

- Air-breathing sea slug, Onchidella maculata Plate, 1893, (TMNP MPA).

===== Superfamily Acteonoidea - Lined bubble shells =====
Family Acteonidae

- Rictaxis albus (G. B. Sowerby III, 1874)(False Bay to KwaZulu-Natal

===== clade Cephalaspidea – head shield slugs =====
Family Cylichnidae

- Cylichna tubulosa Gould, 1859 (Angola to Durban)

Family Retusidae

- Retusa truncatula (Bruguiere, 1792) (False Bay to Durban, also northern Europe, Mediterranean, Canary Islands)

Family Philinidae

- Sand slug, shelled sand slug, Philine aperta (Linnaeus, 1767) (eastern Atlantic Ocean, Northern Europe to southern Africa, also Pacific and Indian Oceans)

Family Aglajidae

- Slipper slug, cape slipper slug Philinopsis speciosa Pease, 1860, recorded as syn. Philinopsis capensis (Bergh, 1907) (False Bay to East London)

Family Gastropteridae

- Gastropteron alboaurantium Gosliner, 1984 (Atlantic coast Cape Peninsula)
- Gastropteron flavobrunneum Gosliner, 1984 (Atlantic coast Cape Peninsula)

Family Haminoeidae

- Green bubble shell, Haminoea alfredensis Bartsch, 1915 (Cape Peninsula to north of East London) probable syn. for Haminoea natalensis (Krauss, 1848)

Family Bullidae

- Mottled bubble shell, Bulla ampulla Linnaeus, 1758 (whole South African coast, Indo-Pacific)

===== clade Aplysiomorpha – sea hares =====
Family Aplysiidae

- Sea hare, Aplysia maculata Rang, 1828, recorded as syn. Aplysia gilchristi Bergh, 1907, (TMNP MPA).
- Variable sea hare, Aplysia juliana Quoy & Gaimard, 1832 (Blougbergstrand to Mozambique)
- Spotted sea hare, Aplysia oculifera A. Adams & Reeve, 1850 (Cape Peninsula to KwaZulu-Natal north coast, Indo-Pacific)
- Dwarf sea hare, ?Aplysia parvula Morch, 1863 (Cape Peninsula to northern KwaZulu-Natal, circumtropical) recorded as Aplysia sp.
- Shaggy sea hare, Bursatella leachii (Blainville, 1817) (Saldanha Bay to Mozambique, Indo-Pacific)

===== clade Sacoglossa – sap-sucking slugs =====
Family Oxynoidae

- Lobiger sp. (TMNP MPA).
- Shrek sap-sucking slug, Oxynoe sp. (False Bay and Knynsa Lagoon)

Family Plakobranchidae

- Plant-sucking nudibranch, Elysia spp. (Orange River to northern KwaZulu-Natal)
- Sap-sucker, Elysia rubropunctata, not listed om WoRMS, but might refer to Elysia punctata var. rubropunctata, Macnae, 1954. (TMNP MPA).

Family Hermaeidae

- Samurai sap sucker, Table Bay nudibranch, Aplysiopsis sinusmensalis (Macnae, 1954) (both sides of the Cape Peninsula)

Family Limapontiidae

- Mop sap sucking slug, Placida capensis Macnae, 1954 taxon inquirendum, (TMNP MPA).
- Dendritic nudibranch, Placida dendritica (Alder & Hancock, 1843) (Elands Bay to Port Alfred, cosmopolitan)

===== clade Pleurobranchomorpha – sidegill slugs =====
Family Pleurobranchidae

- Berthella plumula (Montagu, 1803) (Atlantic Coast of the Cape Peninsula at Kommetjie and McClear's Beach, Knysna, northern Europe and Mediterranean)
- Berthella sp. (Bakoven, Atlantic Coast Cape Peninsula)
- Lemon sidegill, lemon pleurobranch, Berthellina granulata (Krauss, 1848) (Atlantic side of Cape Peninsula, False Bay, Knysna Lagoon)
- Giant pleurobranch, Pleurobranchus grandis Pease, 1868, Western False Bay, Knysna lagoon, KwaZulu-Natal, Indo-Pacific, Also reported as Pleurobranchus peroni
- Mosaic pleurobranch, Pleurobranchus nigropunctatus (Bergh, 1907), also reported as P. albiguttatus (Bergh, 1905), Atlantic side of Cape Peninsula to southern Wild Coast, endemic. (TMNP MPA).

Family Pleurobranchaeidae

- Warty pleurobranch, Pleurobranchaea bubala Ev.Marcus and Gosliner, 1984 (Atlantic side of Cape Peninsula to Eastern Cape, possibly endemic).
- Dwarf warty pleurobranch, Pleurobranchaea tarda A.E. Verrill, 1880 (Atlantic Coast of Cape Peninsula to south coast, northern Atlantic ocean)

===== clade Nudibranchia – nudibranchs =====
subclade Doridacea – dorid nudibranchs
Family Aegiridae

- Knobbly nudibranch, Cape knobbed dorid, Aegires ninguis Fahey & Gosliner, 2004 (Atlantic coast Cape Peninsula to Port Elizabeth)

Family Cadlinidae

- Three-spot dorid, Aldisa trimaculata Gosliner in Millen & Gosliner, 1985 (Atlantic coast Cape Peninsula and Gordon's Bay)

Family Dorididae

- Aldisa benguelae Gosliner in Millen & Gosliner, 1985 (Atlantic coast Cape Peninsula)
- Variable dorid, variable nudibranch, Aphelodoris brunnea Bergh, 1907 (False Bay to East London)
- Choc chip nudibranch, Aphelodoris sp.1, (TMNP MPA).
- Spiky dorid, Aphelodoris sp.3, (TMNP NPA).
- Warty dorid, Grainy true dorid, Doris granosa (Bergh, 1907) (Lüderitz in Namibia to Port Elizabeth, also Indian and Atlantic Oceans)(not listed on WoRMS)
- Warty true dorid, Doris sp.1 in South African Sea Slugs, similar to, but genetically distinct from D. verrucosa.
- Velvet dorid, Jorunna tomentosa (Cuvier, 1804) (Elands Bay to Knysna, also Europe)

Family Discodorididae

- Rugby-ball dorid, Atagema sp. reported as Atagema rugosa Pruvot-Fol, 1951 (Atlantic coast, Cape Peninsula, Mediterranean)
- Small-spot dorid, Discodoris sp. 1 (both sides of the Cape Peninsula)
- Blotchy dorid, Geitodoris capensis Bergh, 1907 (Atlantic coast, Cape Peninsula and Port Alfred)
- Chocolate-chip nudibranch, Aphelodoris sp. 1 (both sides of the Cape Peninsula)
- Brown-spotted nudibranch, Aphelodoris sp. 2 (Atlantic coast Cape Peninsula)
- Spiky nudibranch, Aphelodoris sp. 3 (Atlantic coast Cape Peninsula)
- Cow nudibranch, Gargamella bovina Garovoy, Á. Valdés & Gosliner, 1999, (TMNP MPA).
- Ocellate dorid, Gargamella gravastella (western False Bay)
- Gargamella sp. 2 (western False Bay)
- Small spot nudibranch, Paradoris sp. (TMNP MPA).
- Red sponge nudibranch, Rostanga elandsia Garovoy, Valdes & Gosliner, 2001 (Atlantic coast Cape Peninsula to Rooi Els)
- Rostanga phepha Garovoy, Valdés & Gosliner, 2001 (Atlantic coast Cape Peninsula)

Family Cadlinidae

- Saddled nudibranch, Cadlina sp. 1 (False Bay)
- Brown-dotted nudibranch, Cadlina sp. 2 (both sides of the Cape Peninsula)
- Galaxy nudibranch, Cadlina sp. 3, (TMNP MPA).

Family Chromodorididae

- Inkspot nudibranch, Ceratosoma ingozi Gosliner, 1996 (False Bay)
- Red-spotted nudibranch, Goniobranchus heatherae Gosliner, 1994 syn. Chromodoris heatherea (Atlantic coast Cape Peninsula to Port Elizabeth)
- Protea dorid, Verconia protea Gosliner, 1994 (Atlantic coast Cape Peninsula and Gordon's Bay) recorded as syn. Noumea protea
- Cape dorid, Hypselodoris capensis (Barnard, 1927) (Cape Point to the Wild Coast)

Family Dendrodorididae

- Blue-speckled nudibranch, Dendrodoris caesia (Bergh, 1907) (Cape Point to Port Elizabeth)
- Tan dorid, white-spotted nudibranch, Doriopsilla capensis (Bergh, 1907) (Atlantic coast Cape Peninsula)
- Scribbled nudibranch, Doriopsilla areolata Bergh, 1880, (TMNP MPA). There has been some confusion or disagreement as to whether the local species are D. areolata or D. miniata or both.
- Scribbled nudibranch, Doriopsilla miniata (Alder and Hancock, 1864) (Atlantic coast Cape Peninsula to Sodwana Bay, also Mediterranean, India, Australia and Japan)

Family Mandeliidae

- Mandela's nudibranch, Mandelia mirocornata Valdés & Gosliner, 1999 (Cape Peninsula, False Bay and Algoa Bay)

Family Onchidorididae

- Fluffy nudibranch, Acanthodoris planca Fahey & Valdes, 2005 (both sides Cape Peninsula)
- Naartjie nudibranch, Atalodoris sp. (TMNP MPA).

Family Goniodorididae

- Fiery nudibranch, Okenia amoenula (Bergh, 1907) (Atlantic coast Cape Peninsula to Port Elizabeth)
- Citrine nudibranch. Goniodoris castanea Alder & Hancock, 1845 syn. Goniodoris brunnea (Cape Peninsula to Port Alfred, also Europe, Mediterranean, Japan and New Zealand)
- Tugboat nudibranch, Goniodoris mercurialis Macnae, 1958 (both sides of the Cape Peninsula)
- White-lined nudibranch, Trapania sp. 1 (Atlantic coast Cape Peninsula to Knysna)
- Giraffe spot nudibranch, Ancula sp. (Cape Peninsula and False Bay)

Family Corambidae

- Crazed nudibranch, Corambe sp. (False Bay)

Family Polyceridae

- Cape peppercorn nudibranch, Crimora sp. (TMNP MPA).
- Tasselled nudibranch, Kaloplocamus sp. reported as Kaloplocamus ramosus (Cantraine, 1835) (Cape Peninsula to Wild Coast)
- Ghost nudibranch, Lecithophorus capensis Macnae, 1958 (both sides of the Cape Peninsula)
- Orange-clubbed nudibranch, Limacia clavigera (Muller, 1776) (Saldanha Bay to Port Alfred)
- Kelp orange-clubbed nudibranch, Limacia jellyi Toms, Pola, Von der Heyden & Gosliner, 2021, (TMNP MPA).
- Orange-clubbed nudibranch Limacia lucida (W. Stimpson, 1855), (TMNP MPA).
- Crowned nudibranch, Polycera capensis Quoy & Gaimard, 1824 (Lüderitz, Namibia to Port Alfred, also Sydney Harbour)
- Dark crowned nudibranch, Polycera hedgpethi Er. Marcus, 1964, (TMNP MPA).
- Four lined nudibranch, Polycera quadrilineata (Muller, 1776) (False Bay, Knysna Lagoon and Algoa Bay)
- Twin-crowned nudibranch, Polycera sp. 1 (False Bay)
- Orange striped crowned nudibranch, Polycera sp. 2, (TMNP MPA).
- Yellow knot crowned nudibranch, Polycera sp. 3, (TMNP MPA).
- Black nudibranch, Tambja capensis (Bergh, 1907) (Atlantic coast Cape Peninsula to Port Elizabeth)
- Feather nudibranch, Thecacera sp. previously recorded as Thecacera pennigera (Montagu, 1815) (Cape Peninsula to KwaZulu-Natal, cosmopolitan)

subclade Dendronotida
Family Scyllaeidae

- Iridescent nudibranch, Notobryon thompsoni Pola, Camacho-García & Gosliner, 2012, previously recorded as Notobryon wardi Odhner, 1936 and Notobryon sp. (Elands Bay to Jeffreys Bay)

Family Tethydidae

- Dinosaur nudibranch, Melibe liltvedi Gosliner, 1987 (Atlantic coast Cape Peninsula)
- Cowled nudibranch, Melibe rosea Rang, 1829 (Port Nolloth to Port Alfred)

Family Dotidae

- Crowned doto, Doto africoronata Shipman & Gosliner, 2015, previously reported as Doto coronata (Gmelin, 1791) (Atlantic coast Cape Peninsula to Knysna, also North Atlantic and Mediterranean) but now recognised as a different species.
- Feathered doto, Doto pinnatifida (Montagu, 1804) (Atlantic coast Cape Peninsula to Knysna, also English Channel)
- Doto rosea Trinchese, 1881 (False Bay)
- Doto splendidissima Pola & Gosliner, 2015, (TMNP MPA).

Family Tritoniidae

- Whip-fan nudibranch, Duvaucelia odhneri Marcus, 1983 (Atlantic coast Cape Peninsula, also Atlantic coasts of Britain, Ireland and France) recorded as syn. Tritonia nilsodhneri and as Duvaucelia sp.
- Soft coral nudibranch, Marionia sp. also recorded as Tritonia sp. 1 (False Bay to Port Elizabeth)
- Brush nudibranch, Tritonia sp. 2 (both sides Cape Peninsula, Gordons Bay and Jeffreys Bay)

subclade Euarminida
Family Arminidae

- Gilchrist's armina, Armina gilchristi (Bergh, 1907) (Cape Point to Jeffreys Bay)
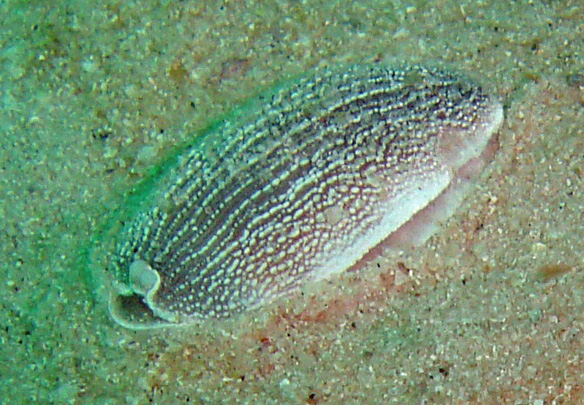
  Gilchrist's armina
- Pierre's armina, Armina sp. (False Bay)
- Striped sand slug, Armina sp. (TMNP MPA).
- White-ridged nudibranch, Dermatobranchus sp. 1 (Atlantic coast Cape Peninsula and Port Elizabeth)
- Brown ridged nudibranch, Dermatobranchus sp. 4 (both sides Cape Peninsula)
- White-ridged nudibranch, Dermatobranchus sp. (TMNP MPA).
- Narrow-ridged nudibranch, Dermatobranchus sp. (TMNP MPA).

subclade Cladobranchia
Family Coryphellidae

- White-edged nudibranch, Coryphella capensis Thiele, 1925, also recorded as syn. Fjordia capensis (Thiele, 1925), and syn. Flabellina capensis (Thiele, 1925), (Atlantic coast Cape Peninsula to Port Elizabeth)

Family Cuthonidae

- Cuthona sp. 1 (both sides Cape Peninsula)
- Cuthona sp. 2 (both sides Cape Peninsula)

Family Fionidae

- Goose barnacle nudibranch, Fiona pinnata (Eschscholtz, 1831), (TMNP MPA).

Family Janolidae

- Cape silvertip nudibranch, Antiopella capensis (Bergh, 1907) also recorded as syn. Janolus capensis Bergh, 1907 (Saldanha Bay to East London)
- Medallion silvertip nudibranch, Antiopella longidentata (Gosliner, 1981) also recorded as syn. Janolus longidentatus Gosliner, 1981 (False Bay)
- Nippled nudibranch, Janolus sp. (South Paw, off Clifton, Cape Peninsula)
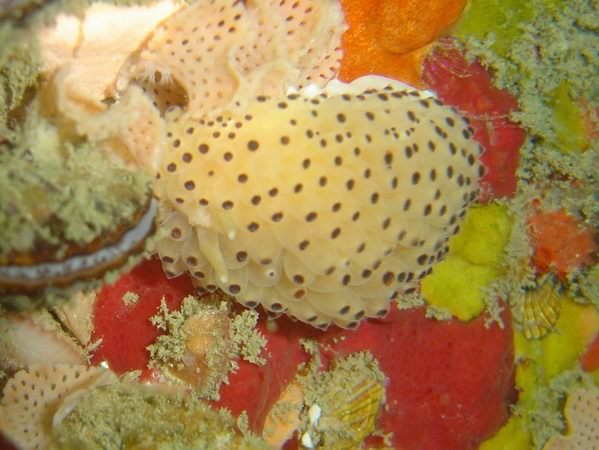
  Nippled nudibranch at South Paw
- Gasflame nudibranch, Bonisa nakaza Gosliner, 1981 (Atlantic coast Cape Peninsula to Port Elizabeth)

Family Lemindidae

- Frilled nudibranch, Leminda millecra Griffiths, 1985 (Cape Peninsula to KwaZulu-Natal)

Family Tergipedidae

- Tergipes tergipes Forskal, 1779 (both sides Cape Peninsula, widespread in the Atlantic Ocean)(as Tergipes sp.?)
- Taloned nudibranch, Tergipes sp. 2, (TMNP MPA).

Family Trinchesiidae

- Catriona casha Gosliner & Griffiths, 1981 (Langebaan Lagoon to Knysna)
- Catriona columbiana (O'Donoghue, 1922) (Cape Town Harbour, Pacific coast of North America and Japan)
- Sunset nudibranch, ?Tenellia casha (not listed on WoRMS) (TMNP MPA).
- Candy nudibranch, Trinchesia speciosa (Macnae, 1954) (Atlantic coast Cape Peninsula to Port Elizabeth) recorded as syn. Cuthona speciosa
- Yellow candy nudibranch, Trinchesia sp. (TMNP MPA),

subclade Aeolidida – aeolid nudibranchs
Family Aeolidiidae

- Indica nudibranch, Anteaeolidiella cacaotica (Bergh, 1888) syn. Anteaeolidiella foulisi, Anteaeolidiella indica, Aolidiella indica (Saldanha Bay to southern KwaZulu-Natal, circumtropical)
- Anemone nudibranch, Anteaeolidiella saldanhensis (Barnard, 1927), (TMNP MPA).

Family Embletoniidae

- Embletonia gracilis Risbec, 1928 (western False Bay, also Japan, New Caledonia, Australia and Hawaii)

Family Eubranchidae

- Eubranchus sp. 1 (both sides Cape Peninsula)
- Eubranchus sp. 2 (False Bay to Knysna)
- Fireworks nudibranch, Eubranchus sp. 4 (near Vulcan rock, south of Hout Bay)
- Candelabra nudibranch, Eubranchus sp. 5 (False Bay)
- Amber nudibranch, Eubranchus sp. (TMNP MPA).

Family Flabellinidae

- Purple lady nudibranch, Paraflabellina funeka Gosliner and Griffiths, 1981 recorded as syn. Flabellina capensis (Cape Point to Port Elizabeth)
- Flabellina sp. 1 (both sides Cape Peninsula)
- Flabellina sp. 2 (western False Bay: Windmill and Dassie Point)

Family Facelinidae

- Night sky nudibranch, Amanda armata Macnae, 1954 (both sides Cape Peninsula and False Bay)
- Black-dot nudibranch, Caloria sp. 1 (both sides Cape Peninsula)
- Yellow-tipped nudibranch, Caloria sp. 2 (both sides Cape Peninsula)
- Orange-eyed nudibranch, Cratena capensis Barnard, 1927 (Saldanha Bay to Port Alfred)
- Elegant nudibranch, Cratena sp. 1 (False Bay to Plettenberg Bay)
- Olive nudibranch, Facelina olivacea Macnae, 1954 (Saldanha Bay to Cape Town Harbour, Knysna and Jeffreys Bay)

Family Myrrhinidae

- Four-colour nudibranch, Godiva quadricolor (Barnard, 1927) (Bloubergstrand to East London, also Ghana)
- Coral nudibranch, Phyllodesmium horridum (Macnae, 1954) (False Bay to Sodwana Bay, also Japan and Australia)

Family Glaucidae

- Sea swallow, blue glaucus, Glaucus atlanticus Forster, 1777 (False Bay to KwaZulu-Natal, circumtropical).

===== Order Siphonariida =====
Family Siphonariidae

- Cape false limpet, Siphonaria capensis Quoy & Gaimard, 1833, (TMNP MPA).
- Siphonaria compressa Allanson, 1958, (TMNP MPA).
- Ribbed false-limpet, Siphonaria concinna G. B. Sowerby I, 1823, (TMNP MPA).
- Siphonaria deflexa (Helbling, 1779), nomen dubia (TMNP MPA).
- Eyed false-limpet, Siphonaria oculus Krauss, 1848, (TMNP MPA).
- Serrate false-limpet, Siphonaria serrata (Fischer von Waldheim, 1807), (TMNP MPA),

=== Bivalvia ===
Order Arcida
Family Arcidae – ark clams

- Oblique ark shell, Barbatia obliquata (Gray, 1837) (Cape Columbine to Mozambique)

Order Cardiida
Family Donacidae

- White mussel, Donax serra Röding, 1798 (TMNP MPA).
- Butterfly wedge-shell, Latona sordida (Hanley, 1845), recorded as syn. Donax sordidus Hanley, 1845. (TMNP MPA).

Order Carditida
Family Carditidae

- Rough false cockle, Cardita caliculaeformis Deshayes, 1863. (TMNP MPA).
- Dead man's hands, Thecalia concamerata (Gmelin, 1791) (Port Nolloth to Transkei)

Order Limida
Family Limidae – file shells

- File shell, Limaria tuberculata (Olivi, 1792) (Cape Columbine to KwaZulu-Natal south coast)

Order Mytilida
Family Mytilidae

- Estuarine mussel, Arcuatula capensis (Krauss, 1848), (TMNP MPA).
- Ribbed mussel, Aulacomya atra (Molina, 1782) (Namibia to Eastern Cape) recorded as syn. Aulacomya ater
- Brack-water mussel, Brachidontes virgiliae (Barnard, 1964), (TMNP MPA).
- Black mussel, Choromytilus meridionalis (Krauss, 1848) (Namibia to Tsitsikamma)
- Half-hairy mussel, Gregariella petagnae (Scacchi, 1832) (Namibia to central KwaZulu-Natal)
- Mediterranean mussel, Mytilus galloprovincialis Lamarck, 1819 (Orange River to Eastern Cape)
- Brown mussel, Perna perna (Linne, 1758) (Cape Point to Mozambique)

Order Ostreida
Family Ostreidae – true oysters

- Brooding oyster, Ostrea atherstonei Newton, 1913 (Saldanha Bay to KwaZulu-Natal south coast)
- Cape rock oyster, Striostrea margaritacea (Lamarck, 1819) (Cape Point to Mozambique), recorded as syn. Crassostrea margaritacea

Family Pinnidae – pen shells

- Scaly horse mussel, horse mussel, Atrina squamifera (Sowerby, 1835) (Cape Columbine to Eastern Cape)

Order Pectinida
Family Pectinidae – scallops

- South African scallop, edible scallop, Pecten sulcicostatus Sowerby II, 1842 (Cape Point to Eastern Cape)
- Dwarf fan shell, Talochlamys multistriata (Reeve, 1853) (Cape Columbine to Mozambique) recorded as syn. Chlamys tincta

Order Venerida
Family Mactridae – trough shells

- Otter shell, Lutraria lutraria (Linneus, 1758) (Namibia to Eastern Cape)
- Smooth trough shell, smooth mactra, Mactra glabrata Linneus, 1767 (Cape Columbine to Mozambique)
- Angular surf clam, Scissodesma spengleri (Linneus, 1767) (Cape Point to Eastern Cape)

Order Venerida
Family Lasaeidae

- Dwarf rusty clam, Lasaea turtoni Bartsch, 1915 (Cape Point to Mozambique)Gmelin 1791 recorded as Lasaea adansoni turtoni

Family Tellinidae

- Ridged tellin, Gastrana matadoa (Gmelin, 1791) (Cape Point to northern KwaZulu-Natal)
- Trilateral tellin Homalina trilatera (Gmelin, 1791), (TMNP MPA). recorded as Tellina trilatera Gmelin, 1791,
- Gilchrist's tellin, Moerella tulipa (Hanley, 1844) (Cape Columbine to Eastern Cape) recorded as Tellina gilchristi Sowerby, 1904 (unaccepted)
- Port Alfred tellin, Pallidea palliderosea (Anton, 1838) (Cape Point to KwaZulu-Natal south coast) reported as Tellina alfredensis Bartsch, 1915 Linnaeus 1758 (unaccepted)
- Trilateral tellin, Homalina trilatera (Gmelin, 1791) recorded as Tellina trilatera Gmelin, 1791 (Orange river to Transkei)

Family Veneridae – Venus shells

- Heart clam, greater heart-clam, Dosinia orbignyi (Dunker, 1845) recorded as Dosinia lupinus orbignyi Dunker, 1845 (Namibia to Eastern Cape)
- Zigzag clam, Pitar hebraeus (Lamarck, 1818) recorded as Pitar abbreviatus Krauss, 1848 (Cape Point to Mozambique)
- Mottled venus, Sunetta bruggeni Fischer-Piette, 1974, recorded as syn. Sunetta contempta bruggeni Fischer & Piette, 1974 (Cape Point to northern KwaZulu-Natal)
- Streaked sand clam, Tivela compressa (Sowerby, 1851) (Cape Point to Eastern Cape)
- Corrugated venus, Venerupis corrugata (Gmelin, 1791) (Namibia to central KwaZulu-Natal)
- Warty venus, Venus verrucosa Linnaeus, 1758 (Namibia to Mozambique)

Order unassigned, Euheterodonta
Family Solenidae

- Pencil bait, Solen capensis P. Fischer, 1881 (Namaqualand to Eastern Cape)

=== Polyplacophora – chitons ===
Order Chitonida
Family Acanthochitonidae

- Spiny chiton, Acanthochitona garnoti de Blainville, 1825 (Cape Columbine to KwaZulu-Natal south coast)

Family Chitonidae

- Tulip chiton, Chiton politus Spengler, 1797 (Cape Columbine to KwaZulu-Natal south coast) recorded as Chiton tulipa (Quoy & Gaimard, 1835).
- Black chiton, Onithochiton literatus (Krauss, 1848) (Cape Point to Mozambique)
- Brooding chiton, Radsia nigrovirescens (de Blainville, 1825) recorded as syn. Chiton nigrovirescens de Blainville, 1825 (Namibia to Cape Agulhas)

Family Callochitonidae

- Broad chiton, Callochiton dentatus Spengler, 1797 recorded as syn. Callochiton castaneus (Wood, 1815) (Orange river to northern KwaZulu-Natal)

Family Chaetopleuridae

- Hairy chiton, Chaetopleura papilio Spengler, 1797 (Namibia to Cape Point)
- Orange hairy chiton, Chaetopleura pertusa Reeve, 1847 (Cape Columbine to northern KwaZulu-Natal)
- Giant chiton, armadillo, Dinoplax gigas Gmelin, 1791 (Cape Point to KwaZulu-Natal south coast)

Family Ischnochitonidae

- Ribbed scale chiton, Ischnochiton bergoti (Velain, 1877) (Namibia to Cape Point)
- Dwarf chiton, Ischnochiton oniscus (Krauss, 1848) (Cape Columbine to Mozambique)
- Textile chiton, Ischnochiton textilis (Gray, 1828) (Namibia to central KwaZulu-Natal)

=== Cephalopoda ===
Order Octopoda – octopus
Family Enteroctopodidae

- Southern giant octopus, Enteroctopus magnificus (Villanueva, P. Sánchez & Compagno Roeleveld, 1992) (TMNP MPA).

Family Octopodidae

- Common octopus, Octopus vulgaris Cuvier, 1797 (Namibia to northern KwaZulu-Natal)
- Brush-tipped octopus, Eledone schultzei Hoyle, 1910 (Cape Columbine to Cape Point) (syn. Eledone thysanophora, Aphrodoctopus schultzei)

Family Argonautidae

- Paper nautilus, Argonauta argo Linnaeus, 1758 (Cape Point to northern KwaZulu-Natal)

Order Teuthida – squid
Family Loliginidae

- Chokka or calimari, Loligo reynaudii d'Orbigny [in Ferussac & d'Orbigny], 1839-1841, recorded as syn. Loligo vulgaris reynaudi (Orbigny, 1845) (Orange River to Eastern Cape)

Order Sepiolida – bobtail squid

- Unidentified species (Cape Peninsula, both sides)

Order Sepiida – cuttlefish Family Sepiidae

- Beautiful cuttlefish, Sepia pulchra Roeleveld & Liltved, 1985, also recorded as syn. Sepia (Hemisepius) pulchra Roeleveld & Liltved, 1985.
- Tuberculate cuttlefish, Sepia tuberculata Lamarck, 1798 (Cape Columbine to Eastern Cape)
- Common cuttlefish, patchwork cuttlefish, Sepia vermiculata Quoy and Gaimard, 1832 (Orange River to Mozambique)
- Pore-bellied cuttlefish, Hemisepius typicus Steenstrup, 1875, recorded as syn. Sepia typica (Steenstrup, 1875), (TMNP MPA).

== Brachiopoda – lampshells ==
Order Lingulida
Family Discinidae

- Disc lamp shell, Discinisca tenuis (Sowerby, 1847), (TMNP MPA).

Order Terebratulida
Family Kraussinidae

- Lamp shell, Kraussina crassicostata Jackson, 1952 (Cape Point to Mossel Bay)
- Ruby lamp shell, Kraussina rubra (Pallas, 1766) (Lüderitz to southern KwaZulu-Natal)

Family Cancellothyrididae

- Lamp shell, Terebratulina meridionalis Jackson, 1952, (Cape Peninsula)

== Echinoderms ==
=== Crinoidea – feather stars ===
Order Comatulida
Family Antedonidae

- Feather star, Annametra occidentalis (AH Clark, 1915), (TMNP MPA).

Family Comatulidae

- Common feather star, Comanthus wahlbergii (Muller, 1843), (False Bay to Mozambique).

Family Tropiometridae

- Elegant feather star, Tropiometra carinata (Lamarck, 1816), (Cape Point to Mozambique).

=== Asteroidea – starfish ===
Order Paxillosida
Family Astropectinidae

- Sand starfish, Astropecten irregularis (Pennant, 1777) (Namibia to Port Elizabeth)
  - Pink sand star, Astropecten irregularis pontoporeus Sladen, 1883.

Order Valvatida
Family Goniasteridae

- Cobbled starfish, Calliaster baccatus Sladen, 1889 (Lamberts Bay to Port Elizabeth)

Family Goniasteridae

- Granular starfish, Fromia schultzei Döderlein, 1910, recorded as syn. Austrofromia schultzei (Doderlein, 1910) (False Bay to Port Elizabeth)

Family Asterinidae

- Beautiful starfish, Callopatiria formosa (Mortensen, 1933, (TMNP MPA).
- Red starfish, Callopatiria granifera (Gray, 1847) (Namibia to Durban) (syn. Patiria granifera)

Order Forcipulatida
Family Asteriidae

- Spiny starfish, Marthasterias africana (Müller & Troschel, 1842), recorded as Marthasterias glacialis (Linnaeus, 1758) (Saldanha Bay to Port Elizabeth)
- Many-armed starfish Coscinasterias calamaria (Gray, 1840) (Saldanha Bay to False Bay)

Order Spinulosida
Family Asterinidae

- Subtidal cushion star, Parvulastra dyscrita (H.L. Clark, 1923), recorded as syn. Patiriella dyscrita (H.L. Clark, 1923) (Cape Point to Port Elizabeth)
- Dwarf cushion star, Parvulastra exigua (Lamarck, 1816) (Namibia to Mozambique) syn. Patiriella exigua

Family Stichasteridae

- Dividing starfish, Allostichaster capensis (Perrier, 1875), (TMNP MPA).

Order Velatida
Family Pterasteridae

- Brooding cushion star, Pteraster capensis Gray, 1847 (Lüderitz to Durban)

Order Spinulosida
Family Echinasteridae

- Reticulated starfish, Henricia ornata (Perrier, 1869) (Lüderitz to Durban)

=== Ophiuroidea – brittlestars ===
Order Euryalida
Family Gorgonocephalidae

- Basket star, gorgon's head brittle star, Astrocladus euryale (Retzius, 1783) (Cape Peninsula to Port Elizabeth)

Order Amphilepidida
Family Amphiuridae

- Brooding snake star, scaly-armed brittlestar, Amphipholis squamata (Delle Chiaje, 1828), (TMNP MPA).

Family Ophiactidae

- Snake-star, Ophiactis carnea Ljungman, 1867, (TMNP MPA).

Order Ophiurida
Family Ophiotrichidae

- Hairy brittle star, Ophiothrix fragilis (Abildgaard, 1789) (Lüderitz to Durban)

Family Amphiuridae

- Equal-tailed brittle star, Amphiura (Amphiura) capensis Ljungman, 1867, recorded as syn. Amphiura capensis Ljungman 1867 (whole coast)

Family Ophionereididae

- Striped brittle star, Ophionereis dubia (Muller & Troschel, 1842) (False Bay to Mozambique)

Family Ophiodermatidae

- Banded brittle star, Ophiarachnella capensis (Bell, 1888) (Saldanha Bay to Durban)
- Serpent-skinned brittle star Ophioderma wahlbergii Muller & Troschel, 1842 (Lüderitz to Durban)

=== Echinoidea – sea urchins ===
Order Echinoida
Family Echinidae

- Deepwater urchin, Echinus gilchristi Bell, 1904 (Lüderitz to Port Elizabeth)
- Cape urchin, Parechinus angulosus Leske, 1778 (Lüderitz to Durban)

Order Echinolampadacea
Family Echinolampadidae

- Lamp urchin, Echinolampas crassa (Bell, 1880) (False Bay to Port Elizabeth)

Order Spatangoida
Family Brissidae

- Smooth-shelled urchin, Spatagobrissus mirabilis H.L. Clark, 1923 (False Bay)

Family Loveniidae

- Heart urchin, Echinocardium cordatum (Pennant, 1777) (Lamberts Bay to Mozambique)

=== Holothuroidea – sea cucumbers ===
Order Dendrochirotida
Family Cucumariidae

- Mauve sea cucumber, cask sea cucumber, Pentacta doliolum (Pallas, 1766) (West African coast to Port Elizabeth)
- Horseshoe sea cucumber, Roweia frauenfeldi (Ludwig, 1882) (Angola to East London)
- Stephenson's sea cucumber, Roweia stephensoni (John, 1939) (False Bay to Wild Coast)
- Red-chested sea cucumber, Hemiocnus insolens (Théel, 1886), recorded as syn. Pseudocnella insolens (Théel, 1886), (Port Nolloth to Durban)

Family Phyllophoridae

- Golden sea cucumber, Thyone aurea (Quoy & Gaimard, 1834) (Lüderitz to False Bay)

== Chaetognatha – Arrow worms ==
Family Sagittidae

- Common arrow worm, Sagitta sp. (TMNP MPA).

== Hemichordata ==
Class Enteropneusta

Family Ptychoderidae

- Cape acorn worm, Balanoglossus capensis Gilchrist, 1908, (TMNP MPA).

== Tunicates ==
Order Aplousobranchia

Family Clavelinidae

- Bell ascidian, Clavelina lepadiformis (Muller, 1776) (False Bay to Port Elizabeth)
- Choirboys, Clavelina sp. syn Podoclavella sp. (Western Cape)
- Snowball ascidian, Distaplia skoogi Michaelsen, 1934 (False Bay and Ibo Island Mozambique)
- Foam ascidian, Polycitor porrecta (Millar, 1962) (Atlantic coast Cape Peninsula)
- Sago pudding ascidian, Cystodytes dellechiajei (Della Valle, 1877) (False Bay to Sodwana Bay, also Atlantic Ocean and Mediterranean)
- Choirboys Pycnoclavella narcissus Kott, 2005, (TMNP MPA).

Family Didemnidae

- Lattice ascidian, Didemnum spp. (False Bay to Sodwana Bay)
- Brain ascidian, Trididemnum cerebriforme Hartmeyer, 1913 (Cape Columbine to Durban)
- Gossamer ascidian, Diplosoma listerianum (Milne-Edwards, 1841) (Cape Columbine to Mozambique)

Family Holozoidae

- Lobed ascidian, bulb ascidian, Sigillina digitata (Millar, 1962) (Western Cape)
- Fan ascidian, Sycozoa arborescens Hartmeyer, 1912 (Namibian border to Port Elizabeth)

Family Polycitoridae

- Foam ascidian, Polycitor porrecta (Millar, 1962), (TMNP MPA).

Family Polyclinidae

- Mushroom ascidian, Aplidium circulatum (Hartmeyer, 1912) (False Bay to Jeffreys Bay)
- Aplidium crustatum F. Monniot, 2001 (Saldanha Bay to False Bay)
- Rosette sea squirt Aplidium flavolineatum (Sluiter, 1898a) (Saldanha Bay to Sodwana Bay)
- Sago pudding ascidian, Cystodytes dellechiajei (Della Valle, 1877), (TMNP MPA).

Order Phlebobranchia

Family Ascidiidae

- Red-spotted ascidian, Ascidia incrassata Heller, 1878 (Saldanha Bay to Mozambique)
- Crevice ascidian, Ascidia caudata Heller, 1878 (Cape Peninsula)

Family Cionidae

- Transparent ascidian, sea vase, Ciona intestinalis (Linnaeus, 1767) (whole coast, cosmopolitan)

Order Pyrosomatida

Family Pyrosomatidae

- Fire-roller, Pyrosoma sp. (TMNP MPA).

Order Salpida

Family Salpidae

- Three-tailed salp, Thalia sp. (TMNP MPA).

Order Stolidobranchia

Family Pyuridae

- Herdman's redbait, Pyura herdmani (Drasche, 1884) (Walvis Bay to Durban)
- Red bait, Pyura stolonifera (Heller, 1878) (Namibia to Durban)

Family Styelidae

- Ladder ascidian, Botrylloides leachii (Savigny, 1816) (West coast of Africa to southern KwaZulu-Natal)
- White-ringed ascidian, Botrylloides magnicoecum (Hartmeyer, 1912) (Orange River to Durban) syn. Botryllus magnicoecus
- Fenced ascidian, Botryllus closionis Monniot, Monniot, Griffiths & Schleyer, 2001 (Atlantic coast Cape Peninsula)
- Seaweed ascidian, Botryllus elegans (Quoy & Gaimard, 1834) (Lüderitz to Cape Agulhas)
- Variable ascidian, Botryllus gregalis (Sluiter, 1898) (Cape Columbine to Durban)
- Meandering ascidian, Botryllus maeandrius (Sluiter, 1898) (Cape Peninsula to Mossel Bay)
- Golden star ascidian, Botryllus schlosseri (Pallas, 1766) (Cape Columbine to Port St Johns (alien))
- Elephant's ears, Gynandrocarpa placenta (Herdman, 1886) (Cape Peninsula to Algoa Bay)
- Angular ascidian, Styela angularis (Stimpson, 1855) (Atlantic coast of Cape Peninsula to Port Elizabeth)

== Cephalochordata – Lancelets ==
Family Branchiostomatidae

- Cape lancelet, Branchiostoma capense Gilchrist, 1902, (TMNP MPA).

== Geographical position of places mentioned in species ranges ==
- Agulhas Bank, Western Cape 35°30′S 21°00′E
- Algoa Bay, Eastern Cape, 33°55′S 25°42′E
- Bashee River, Eastern Cape 32°15′S 28°54′E
- Beira, Mozambique19°50′S 34°51′E
- Blaauwberg, Western Cape, 33°48′S 18°27′E
- Cape Agulhas, Western Cape, 34°50′00″S 20°00′09″E
- Cape Columbine, Western Cape, 32°49′39″S 17°51′23″E
- Cape Frio, Namibia, 18°26′12″S 12°00′17″E
- Cape of Good Hope, Western Cape, 34°21′29″S 018°28′19″E (sometimes used historically to refer to the Cape Province, or South Africa)
- Cape Peninsula, Western Cape 34°12′S 18°24′E
- Coffee Bay, Eastern Cape, 31°58′S 29°09′E
- Dassen Island, Western Cape, 33°25′S 18°5′E
- Dassie Point, False Bay,
- Delagoa Bay, Mozambique, 25°59′S 32°42′E
- Doring Bay (Doringbaai), Western Cape, 31°49′S 18°14′E
- Durban, KwaZulu-Natal, 29°51′S 31°01′E
- East London, Eastern Cape, 32°59′S 027°52′E
- Elands Bay, Western Cape, 32°18′S 18°19′E
- False Bay, Western Cape, 34°14′S 18°39′E
- Gordon's Bay Western Cape 34°10′00″S 18°52′00″E
- Hermanus, Western Cape, 34°25′S 19°14′E
- Hout Bay, Cape Peninsula, Western Cape, 34°03′30″S 18°21′20″E
- Inhaca, Mozambique, 26°0′S 32°55′E
- Jeffrey's Bay, Eastern Cape, 34°2′S 24°55′E
- Kei River, Eastern Cape, 32°40′35″S 28°23′10″E
- Knysna, Western Cape, 34°05′02″S 23°03′37″E
- Kommetjie, Western Cape, 34°08′S 18°19′E
- Kosi Bay, Kwa-Zulu-Natal, 26°54′06″S 32°51′59″E
- Lamberts Bay, Western Cape, 32°05′24″S 18°18′10″E
- Langebaan Lagoon, Western Cape, 33°09′S 18°04′E
- Limpopo River, Mozambique, 25°10′S 33°35′E
- Lüderitz, Namibia, 26°38′53″S 15°9′34″E
- Mabibi, (Mbibi) Kwa-Zulu-Natal, 29°20′10″S 32°45′10″E
- Mazeppa Bay, Eastern Cape, 32.478°S 28.651°E
- Melkbosstrand, Western Cape, 33°43′38″S 18°26′06″E
- Miller's Point, Cape Peninsula, 34°13′51.6″S 18°28′26.4″E
- Mossel Bay, Western Cape, 34°11′S 22°08′E
- Möwe Point (Namibia),19°22′47.85″S 12°42′29.02″E (Möwe Point lighthouse)
- Muizenberg, False Bay, Western Cape, 34°07′S 018°28′E
- Noordhoek, Cape Peninsula, Western Cape, 34°07′S 18°21′E
- Olifants River (Western Cape) 31°42′S 18°13′E
- Onrust River, Western Cape, 34°25′8″S 19°10′44″E
- Orange River, Northern Cape, 28°38′S 16°27′E
- Plettenberg Bay, Western Cape, 34°03′S 023°22′E
- Port Alfred, Eastern Cape, 33°36′15″S 26°54′12″E
- Port Elizabeth, Eastern Cape, 33°58′S 25°35′E
- Port Nolloth, Northern Cape, 22°15′S 16°52′E
- Port St. Johns, KwaZulu-Natal, 31°37′40″S 29°33′20″E
- Richards Bay, KwaZulu-Natal, 28°48′S 32°06′E
- Rooikrans, Cape Peninsula 34°20′28″S 18°28′23″E
- Saldanha Bay, Western Cape, 33°01′S 17°59′E
- Slangkop, Cape Peninsula, 34°08′54.59″S 18°19′11.89″E
- Smitswinkel Bay, False Bay, Western Cape, 34°16′S 18°28′E
- Sodwana Bay, KwaZulu-Natal, 27°32′S 32°41′E
- Storms River, Eastern Cape, 34°01′15″S 23°54′10″E
- Strandfontein, False Bay, Western Cape, 34°05′22″S 18°33′18″E
- Strandfontein, Western Cape, 31°45′20″S 18°13′38″E
- Swakopmund, Namibia, 22°41′S 14°32′E
- Table Bay, Western Cape, 33°53′S 18°27′E
- Tsitsikamma, Eastern Cape, 34°01′18″S 22°53′44″E
- Umtata River 31°56′S 29°11′E
- Vulcan Rock, Cape Peninsula, 34°03′58″S 18°18′35″E
- Walvis Bay, Namibia, 22°57′22″S 14°30′29″E
- Windmill Beach Simon's Town, Cape Peninsula, 34°12′04″S 18°27′24″E
- Xora River, Eastern Cape, 32°09′00″S 28°59′00″E

== See also ==
- List of echinoderms of South Africa – List of species that form a part of the echinoderm fauna of South Africa
- List of marine crustaceans of South Africa – List of saltwater species that form a part of the crustacean fauna of South Africa
- List of marine fishes of South Africa – Fishes recorded from the oceans bordering South Africa
- List of marine molluscs of South Africa – List of saltwater species that form a part of the molluscan fauna of South Africa
- List of sea spiders of South Africa – List of saltwater species that form a part of the pycnogonid fauna of South Africa
- List of brown seaweeds of South Africa
- List of green seaweeds of South Africa
- List of red seaweeds of South Africa
- List of brown seaweeds of the Cape Peninsula and False Bay – Regional biodiversity species list
- List of green seaweeds of the Cape Peninsula and False Bay – Regional biodiversity species list
- List of marine vertebrates of the Cape Peninsula and False Bay – Regional biodiversity species list
- List of red seaweeds of the Cape Peninsula and False Bay – Regional biodiversity species list
- Geology of Cape Town
