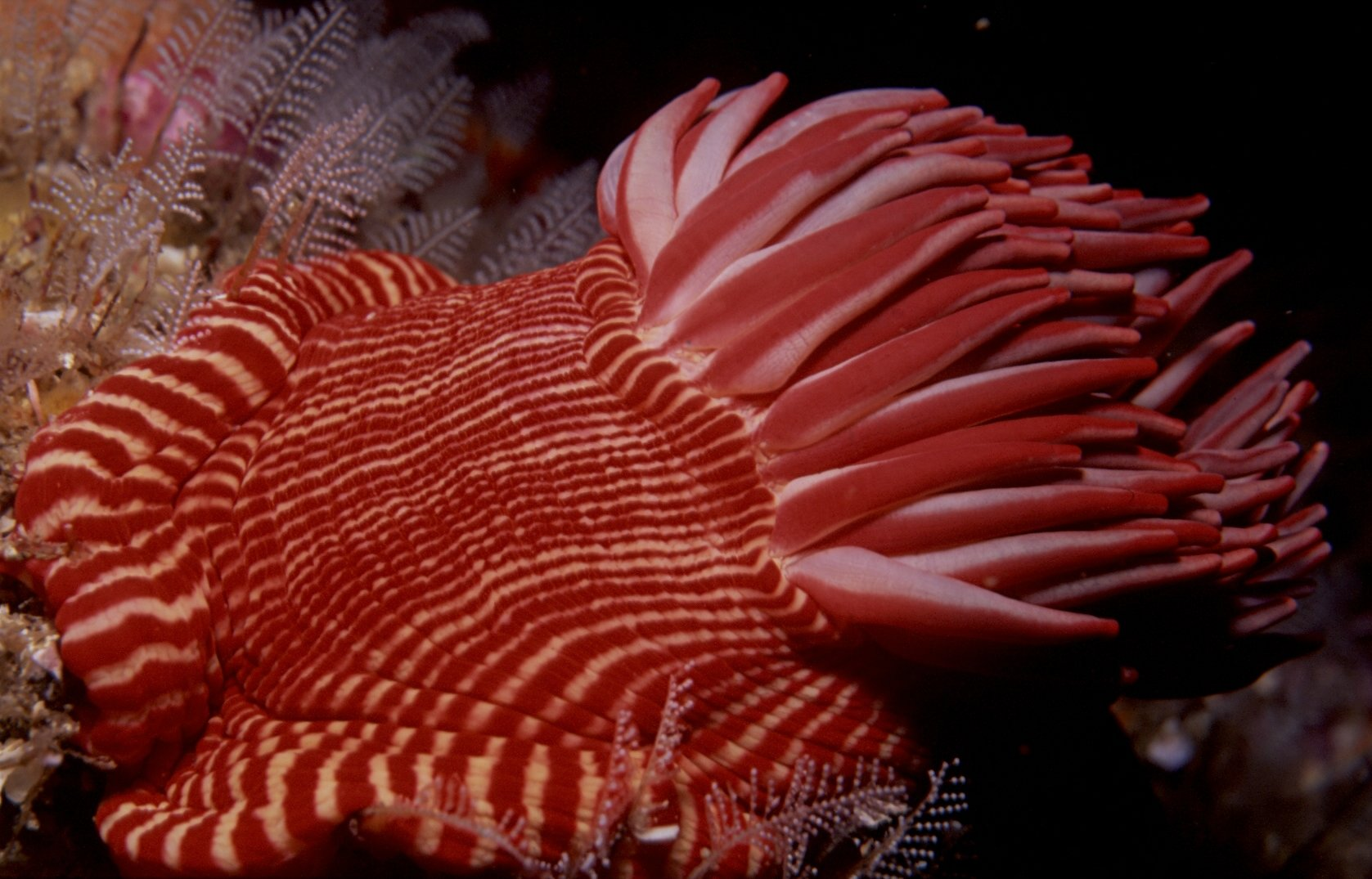

Scientific classification
- Kingdom: Animalia
- Phylum: Cnidaria
- Subphylum: Anthozoa
- Class: Hexacorallia
- Order: Actiniaria
- Family: Actiniidae
- Genus: Korsaranthus; Riemann-Zurneck, 1999
- Species: K. natalensis

Binomial name
- Korsaranthus natalensis (Carlgren, 1938)

= Korsaranthus =

Korsaranthus natalensis

Species of sea anemone

Korsaranthus is a genus of sea anemones in the family Actiniidae. It is monotypic, being represented by the single species Korsaranthus natalensis, commonly known as the spinnaker anemone or the candy-striped anemone.

== Description ==
The spinnaker anemone is a medium-sized anemone of up to 10 cm in diameter. It is a vividly coloured red and white striped anemone. Its column has fine striping. It has about 50 broadly striped tentacles. Red and pink lines radiate outwards from its mouth. It has a walking disc which is red with white striping.

== Distribution ==
The spinnaker anemone is endemic to the South African coast, from False Bay to Durban. It is found in waters from 10 m to at least 30 m in depth.

== Ecology ==
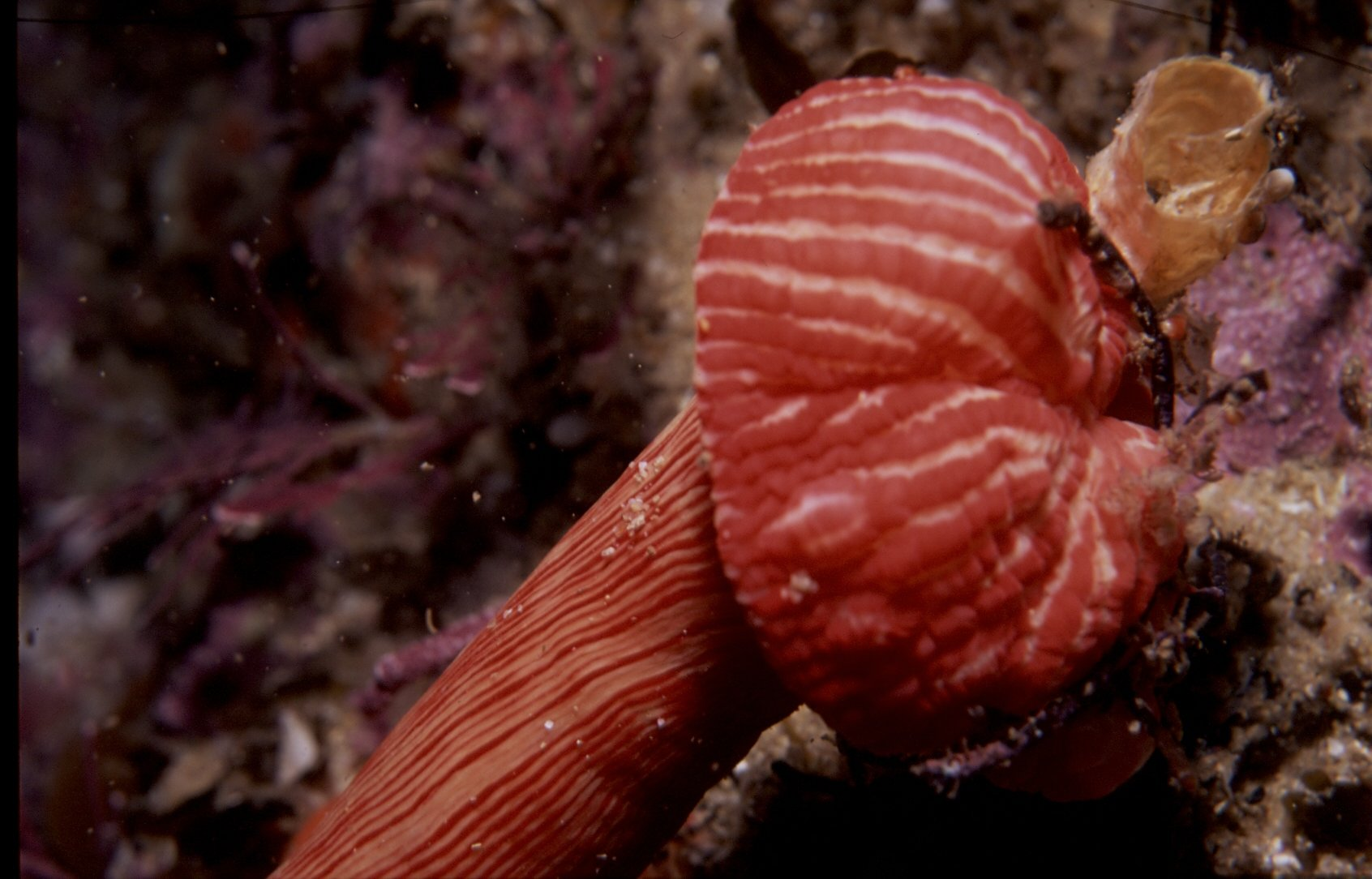
a close up of the parachute foot of a spinnaker anemone

This is a rare species of anemone. It is mobile and may be observed, when not attached to the reef, using its parachute-like walking disc to sail to new locations. It preys on octocorals.
