= Red encrusting sponge =

Scientific classification
- Domain: Eukaryota
- Kingdom: Animalia
- Phylum: Porifera
- Class: Demospongiae
- Order: Poecilosclerida
- Family: Microcionidae
- Genus: Clathria
- Subgenus: Isociella
- Species: C. oudekraalensis

Binomial name
- Clathria oudekraalensis Samaai & Gibbons, 2005

Synonyms
- Clathria oudekraalensis

Species of sponge

The red encrusting sponge (Clathria oudekraalensis) is a species of sea sponge. It is known only from the South African coast, on both sides of the Cape Peninsula. It is endemic to this region.

== Description ==
The red encrusting sponge grows to about 1 cm in thickness and up to 30 cm wide. It is a bright red encrusting sponge. Its surface is smooth and the oscula are not visible.

== Habitat ==
This sponge lives on rocky reefs in 6-24m of water.
