= Indothais dubia =

Scientific classification
- Kingdom: Animalia
- Phylum: Mollusca
- Class: Gastropoda
- Subclass: Caenogastropoda
- Order: Neogastropoda
- Superfamily: Muricoidea
- Family: Muricidae
- Subfamily: Rapaninae
- Genus: Indothais
- Species: I. dubia

Binomial name
- Indothais dubia (Schepman, 1919)

Synonyms
- Cymia dubia Schepman, 1919; Thais (Thaisella) dubia (Schepman, 1919); Thaisella dubia (Schepman, 1919)

Species of gastropod

Indothais dubia is a species of sea snail, a marine gastropod mollusk, in the family Muricidae, the murex snails or rock snails.
