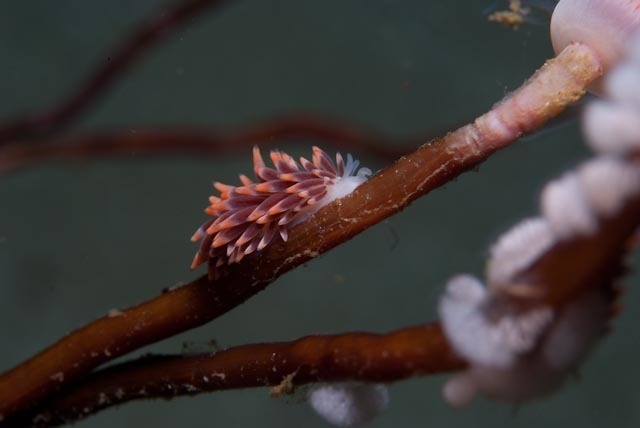

Scientific classification
- Kingdom: Animalia
- Phylum: Mollusca
- Class: Gastropoda
- Order: Nudibranchia
- Suborder: Aeolidacea
- Family: Trinchesiidae
- Genus: Catriona
- Species: C. casha

Binomial name
- Catriona casha Gosliner & Griffiths, 1981

Synonyms
- Tenellia casha (Gosliner & Griffiths, 1981)

= Catriona casha =

Species of gastropod

Catriona casha is a species of sea slug, an aeolid nudibranch, a marine gastropod mollusk in the family Trinchesiidae.

== Distribution ==
This species was described from Cape Town docks, on the Atlantic Ocean coast of South Africa.
