= Gibberula dulcis =

Scientific classification
- Kingdom: Animalia
- Phylum: Mollusca
- Class: Gastropoda
- Subclass: Caenogastropoda
- Order: Neogastropoda
- Family: Cystiscidae
- Subfamily: Cystiscinae
- Genus: Gibberula
- Species: G. dulcis

Binomial name
- Gibberula dulcis (E. A. Smith, 1904)

Synonyms
- Marginella dulcis E. A. Smith, 1904; Marginella ithychila Tomlin, 1918

Species of gastropod

Gibberula dulcis is a species of sea snail, a marine gastropod mollusk, in the family Cystiscidae.
