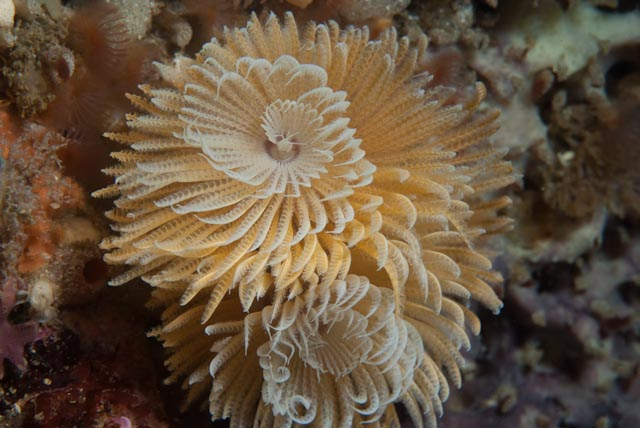

Scientific classification
- Kingdom: Animalia
- Phylum: Annelida
- Clade: Pleistoannelida
- Clade: Sedentaria
- Order: Sabellida
- Family: Sabellidae
- Genus: Pseudobranchiomma
- Species: P. longa

Binomial name
- Pseudobranchiomma longa (Kinberg, 1866)

= Pseudobranchiomma longa =

Species of annelid worm

Pseudobranchiomma longa is a species of marine polychaete worms in the family Sabellidae. It is known as a feather-duster worm or a giant fanworm.

== Description ==
Feather-duster worms grow to up to 15 cm in total length. They are attractive fanworms with their heads modified for feeding. Two large spiral whorls in yellow, red, white or purple extend from a tube and retract rapidly if disturbed.

== Distribution ==
These animals are found off the southern African coast from the Cape Peninsula in South Africa to Mozambique, as well as off Madagascar. They are found intertidally to at least 200m underwater.

== Ecology ==
The tube is built from food particles too large to eat and is cemented together with mucus.

== Synonyms ==
The following species are synonyms of Pseudobranchiomma longa:

- Sabellastarte longa (Kinberg, 1866) (objective synonym)
- Sabella longa Kinberg, 1866 (objective synonym)
