= Marginella peelae =

Scientific classification
- Kingdom: Animalia
- Phylum: Mollusca
- Class: Gastropoda
- Subclass: Caenogastropoda
- Order: Neogastropoda
- Family: Marginellidae
- Genus: Marginella
- Species: M. peelae

Binomial name
- Marginella peelae Bozzetti, 1993

Synonyms
- Marginella beltmani Hart, 1993; Marginella peelae f. beltmani Hart, 1993

Species of gastropod

Marginella peelae is a species of sea snail, a marine gastropod mollusk in the family Marginellidae, the margin snails.
