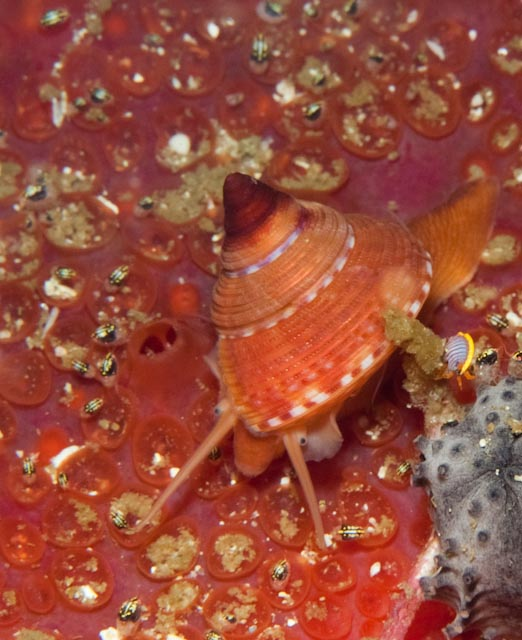

Scientific classification
- Kingdom: Animalia
- Phylum: Mollusca
- Class: Gastropoda
- Subclass: Vetigastropoda
- Order: Trochida
- Family: Calliostomatidae
- Genus: Calliostoma
- Species: C. ornatum

Binomial name
- Calliostoma ornatum (Lamarck, 1822)

Synonyms
- Calliostoma (Calliostoma) ornatum (Lamarck, 1822); Calliostoma albolineatum Turton, 1932; Calliostoma bicingulatum (non Lam.) Sowerby, 1892; Calliostoma convexa Turton, 1932; Calliostoma eucosmia Bartsch, 1915; Calliostoma euglyptum (non A. Adams) Sowerby, 1892; Calliostoma ornata [sic] (incorrect gender ending); Calliostoma ornatum var. similis Turton, 1932; Trochus bicingulatus (non Lamarck) Krauss, 1848; Trochus ornatus Lamarck, 1822

= Calliostoma ornatum =

Ornate topshell, a marine gastropod mollusk in the family Calliostomatidae

Calliostoma ornatum, common name the ornate topshell, is a species of sea snail, a marine gastropod mollusk in the family Calliostomatidae.

== Description ==
The height of the shell attains 20 mm. The ornate topshell is conical shaped. It is imperforate, rather solid but not thick. It may be brown, orange-red or a brilliant violet or pale yellowish, with radiating brown flames above. The base of the shell is dotted with brown and whitish. The sculpture though variable is characteristic. The surface of whorls is encircled by spiral lirae uneven in size, and cut into very close compressed granules. There are about 10 such lirae on the penultimate whorl, but the number is variable owing to the greater or less development of interstitial riblets. The base has 10-13 concentric riblets, which have a tendency to split or become double. They are wider than the interstitial furrows. The conical spire is elevated. The apex acute. The sutures are slightly impressed. The seven whorls are slightly convex. There are generally two or three stronger lirae near the middle or periphery, and this gives at times a slightly bicarinate outline to the body whorl. The flattened base is a little convex. The aperture is subrhomboidal and smooth inside. The arcuate columella is often bounded by a purple streak.

The foot is orange and there are distinct black eye spots at the base of paired tentacles.

== Distribution ==
This snail is found only from the Cape Peninsula to Port Alfred along the South African coast from the low intertidal to at least 35m under water. It is endemic to this region.
