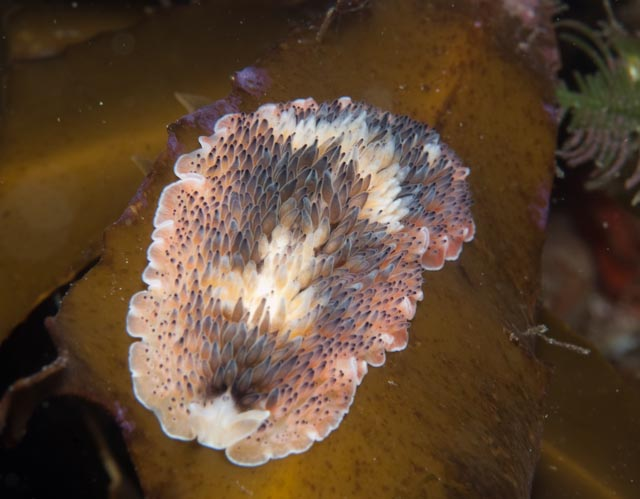

Scientific classification
- Kingdom: Animalia
- Phylum: Platyhelminthes
- Order: Polycladida
- Suborder: Cotylea
- Family: Pseudocerotidae
- Genus: Thysanozoon
- Species: T. brocchii

Binomial name
- Thysanozoon brocchii (Risso, 1818)

= Carpet flatworm =

Species of flatworm

The carpet flatworm (Thysanozoon brocchii) is a polyclad flatworm in the family Pseudocerotidae.

== Description ==
Carpet flatworms may grow to 8 cm in total length. They have pale bodies with pinkish frilled margins. The upper surface of the animal is covered with short finger-like papillae (protrusions) in pinks, caramels and browns. There is a smale pale protruding fold at the head.

== Distribution ==
Carpet flatworms are found off the South African coast from the Cape Peninsula to Port Elizabeth as well as in the Mediterranean and the Red Sea. They are seen subtidally and down to at least 35m underwater.

== Ecology ==
These animals use undulations of their body margins to swim. Their dorsal protrusions aid in oxygen uptake and improve camouflage.

== Synonyms ==
According to the World Register of Marine Species, the following species are synonyms of Thysanozoon brocchii:

- Eolidiceros brocchi (Risso, 1818)
- Eolidiceros panormis Quatrefage, 1845
- Planaria brocchi (Risso, 1818)
- Planaria dicquemaris Delle Chiaje, 1841
- Planaria dicquemaris verrucosa (Delle Chiaje, 1829)
- Planaria tuberculata Delle Chiaje, 1828
- Planaria verrucosa Delle Chiaje, 1829
- Planeolis panormis (Quatrefage, 1845)
- Stylochus papillosus Diesing, 1836
- Tergipes brocchi Risso, 1818
- Thysanozoon brocchii var. cruciatum Laidlaw, 1906
- Thysanozoon dicquemaris (Delle Chiaje, 1841)
- Thysanozoon diesingii Grube, 1840
- Thysanozoon fockei Diesing, 1850
- Thysanozoon lagidium Marcus, 1949
- Thysanozoon panormis (Quatrefage, 1845)
- Thysanozoon papillosum (Diesing, 1836)
- Thysanozoon tuberculatum (Delle-Chiaje, 1828)
