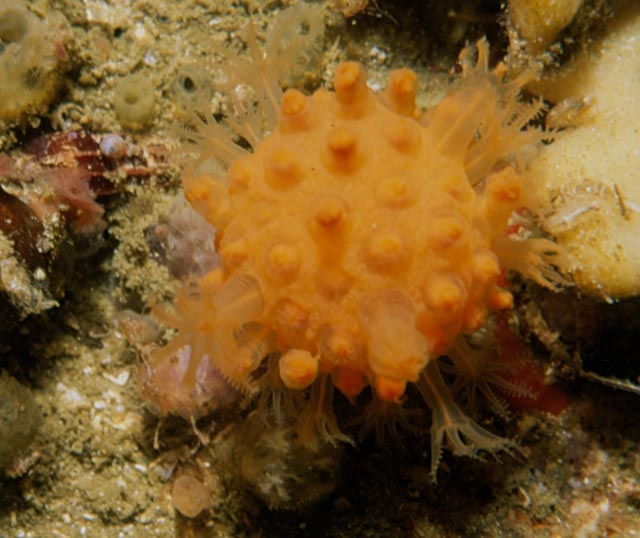
- Sun-burst soft coral

Scientific classification
- Kingdom: Animalia
- Phylum: Cnidaria
- Subphylum: Anthozoa
- Class: Octocorallia
- Order: Malacalcyonacea
- Family: Alcyoniidae
- Genus: Malacacanthus; Thomson, 1910
- Species: M. capensis

Binomial name
- Malacacanthus capensis (Hickson, 1900)

= Sun-burst soft coral =

sun-burst soft coral

Species of coral

The sun-burst soft coral (Malacacanthus capensis) is a species of colonial soft corals in the family Malacacanthidae. It is the only species known in the genus Malacacanthus.

== Description ==
Sun-burst soft corals grow up to 15 cm tall and consist of an orange column with a ball at its top. They are somewhat mushroom-shaped and when feeding have bright orange polyps radiating from the ball on striped transparent stalks.

== Distribution ==
This species is known from the Cape Peninsula to southern KwaZulu-Natal off the South African coast, and lives from 13-93m under water.

== Ecology ==
When threatened the whole ball may withdraw into the top of the body column. In between the feeding polyps are tiny dot-like organs known as siphonozooids which are used to re-inflate the colony after it contracts.
