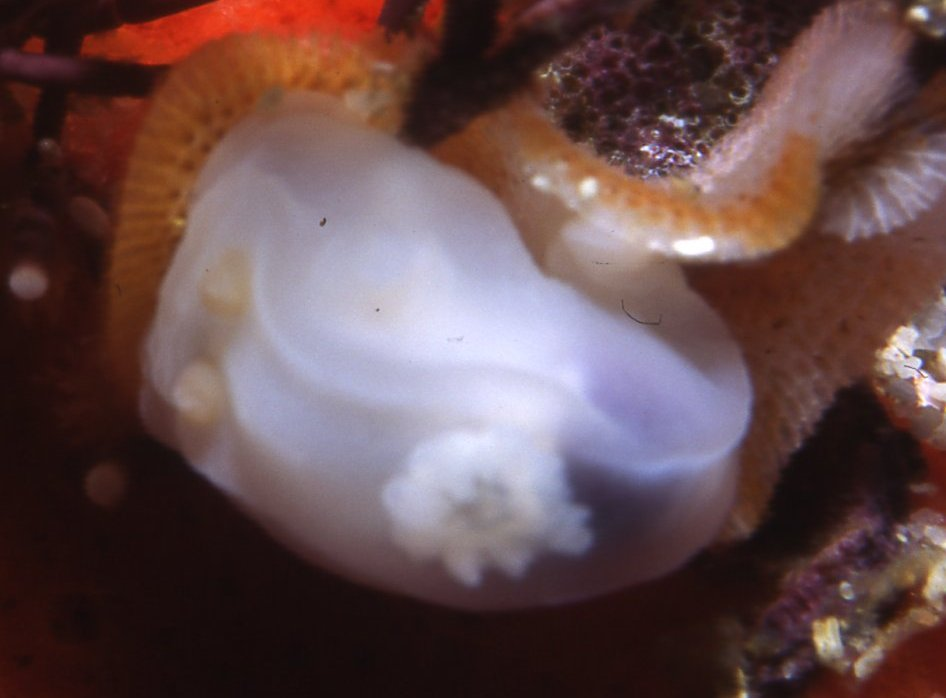

Scientific classification
- Kingdom: Animalia
- Phylum: Mollusca
- Class: Gastropoda
- Order: Nudibranchia
- Family: Polyceridae
- Genus: Lecithophorus
- Species: L. capensis

Binomial name
- Lecithophorus capensis Macnae, 1958

= Ghost nudibranch =

Species of gastropod

The ghost nudibranch, Lecithophorus capensis, is a species of dorid nudibranch, and is only found in South Africa. It is a marine gastropod mollusc in the family Polyceridae. It is the sole species of the genus Lecithophorus.

== Distribution ==
This species is endemic to the South African coast and is found on both sides of the Cape Peninsula from the intertidal to at least 30 m.

== Description ==
The ghost nudibranch is an almost transparent animal with a deep body and an opaque white margin. Its digestive system is visible as a purple mass at the posterior end of its body. Its rhinophores and gills are white.

== Ecology ==
The ghost nudibranch feeds on colonial sea squirts and bryozoans.
