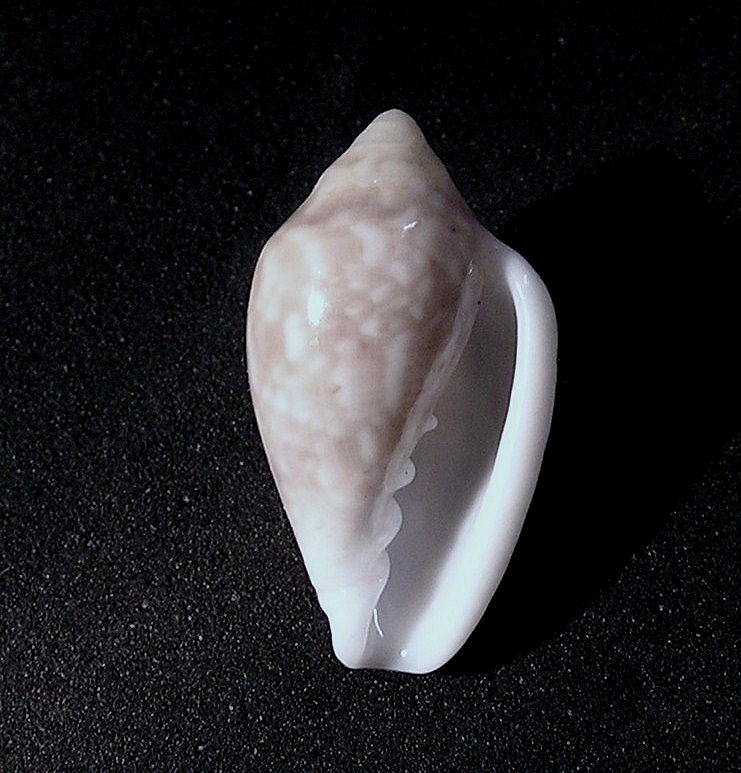
- Apertural view of Marginella fishhoenkensis

Scientific classification
- Kingdom: Animalia
- Phylum: Mollusca
- Class: Gastropoda
- Subclass: Caenogastropoda
- Order: Neogastropoda
- Family: Marginellidae
- Genus: Marginella
- Species: M. fishhoenkensis

Binomial name
- Marginella fishhoenkensis Massier, 2004

= Marginella fishhoekensis =

Species of gastropod

Marginella fishhoenkensis is a species of sea snail, a marine gastropod mollusk in the family Marginellidae, the margin snails.
