= Lobularia =

Lobularia is the scientific name of several genera of organisms and may refer to:

- Lobularia (coral), a genus of corals in the family Alcyoniidae
- Lobularia (fungus) Velen. (1934), a genus of fungi in the order Helotiales
- Lobularia (plant) Desv. (1815), a genus of plants in the family Brassicaceae
