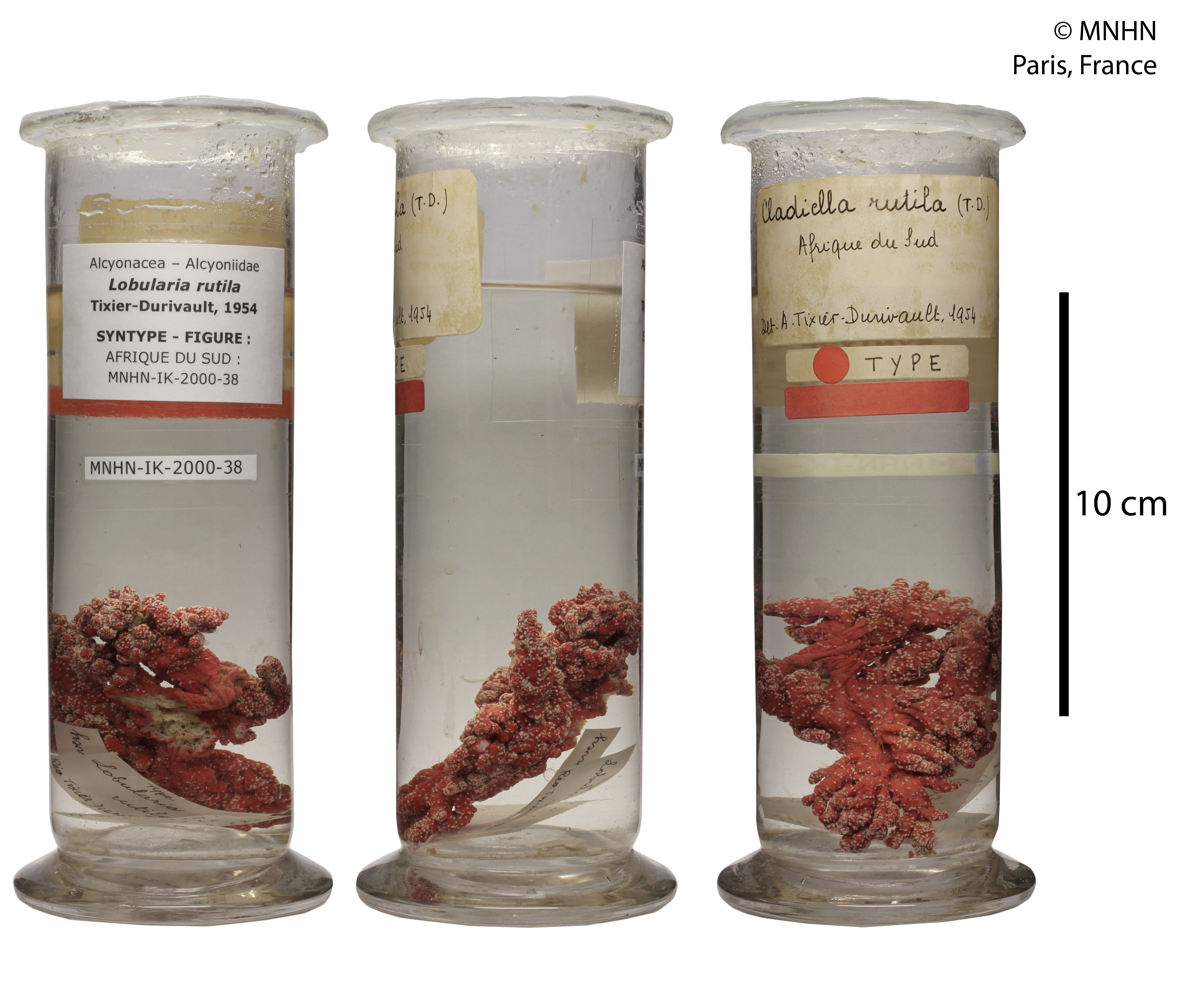
- Lobularia.jpg

Scientific classification
- Kingdom: Animalia
- Phylum: Cnidaria
- Subphylum: Anthozoa
- Class: Octocorallia
- Order: Malacalcyonacea
- Family: Alcyoniidae
- Genus: Lobularia; Savigny

= Lobularia (coral) =

Genus of corals

Lobularia is a genus of soft corals in the family Alcyoniidae.

== Former species ==
According to the World Register of Marine Species, none of the species previously classified in this genus are accepted as members. So while the genus exists, it is unoccupied.

Previously classified species and their new accepted classifications are as follows:

- Lobularia digitata (Linnaeus, 1758) accepted as Alcyonium digitatum Linnaeus, 1758
- Lobularia pauciflora (Ehrenberg, 1834) accepted as Cladiella pauciflora Ehrenberg, 1834
- Lobularia rubiformis Eherenberg, 1834 accepted as Gersemia rubiformis (Ehrenberg, 1834)
- Lobularia spinulosum (Delle Chiajie, 1822) accepted as Paralcyonium spinulosum Delle Chiaje, 1822
