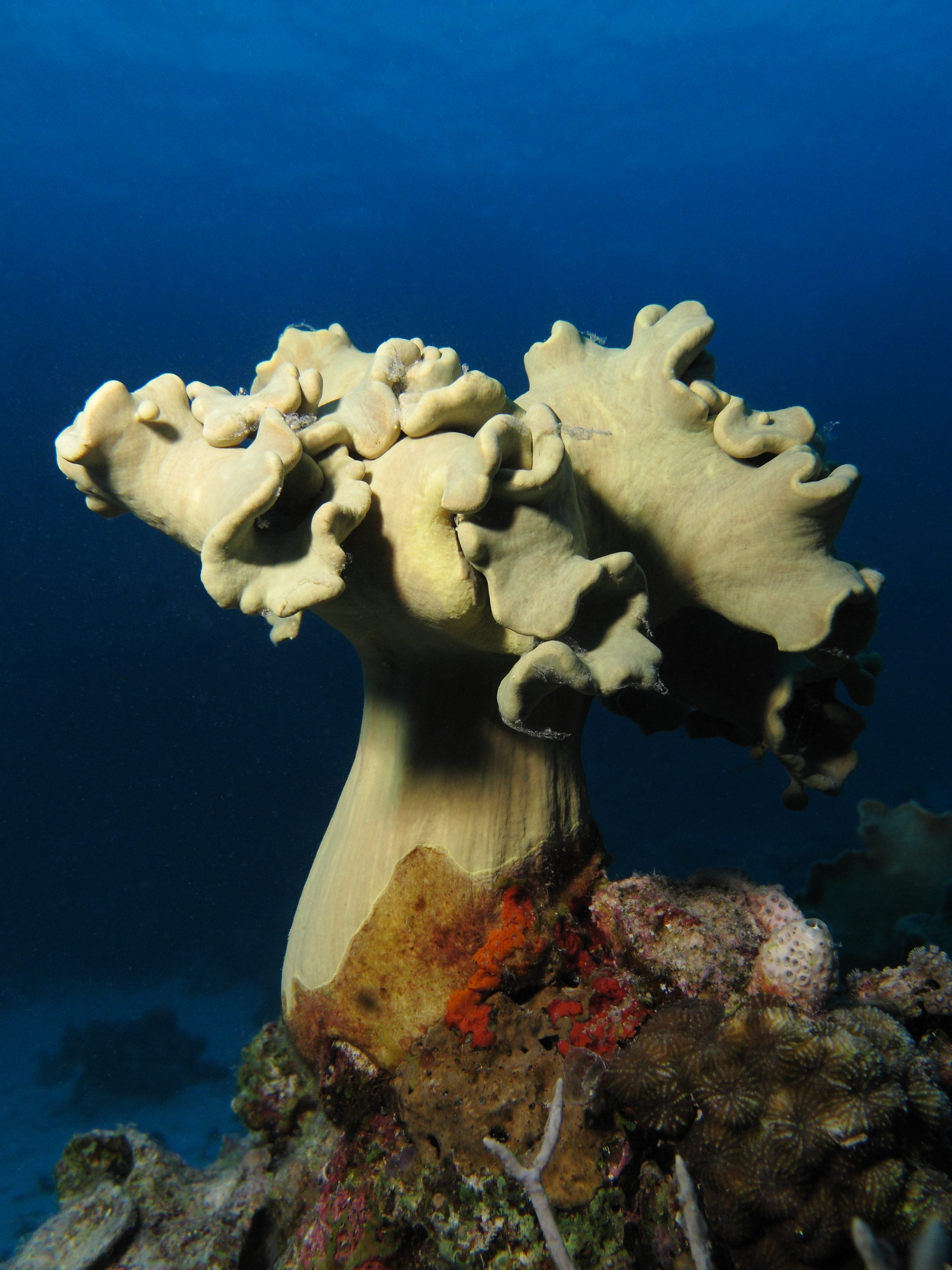
- S. glaucum (tentacles withdrawn)
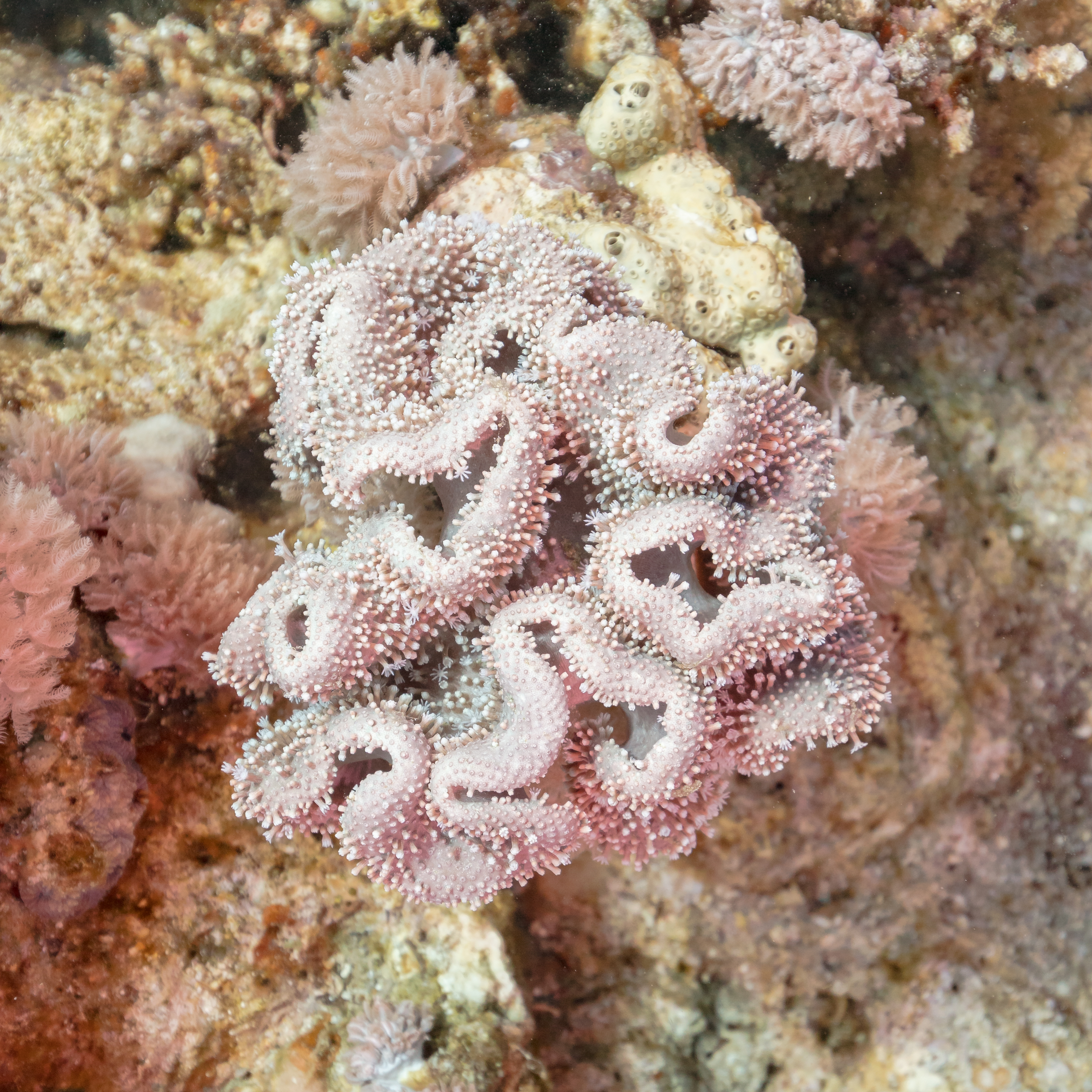

Scientific classification
- Kingdom: Animalia
- Phylum: Cnidaria
- Subphylum: Anthozoa
- Class: Octocorallia
- Order: Malacalcyonacea
- Family: Alcyoniidae
- Genus: Sarcophyton
- Species: S. glaucum

Binomial name
- Sarcophyton glaucum (Quoy & Gaimard, 1833)

Synonyms
- Sarcophyton icolor Pratt, 1905; Sarcophyton tenuis Pratt, 1903

= Sarcophyton glaucum =

Species of coral

Sarcophyton glaucum, also known as toadstool leather coral or rough leather coral, is a common species of soft coral found from the Red Sea to western Pacific Ocean. Sarcophyton glaucum belongs to the phylum Cnidaria, the class Anthozoa, and the family Alcyoniidae.

== Background ==
S. glaucum belongs to the genus Sarcophyton, which is one of seven known genera of Alcyoniidae. In the Red Sea, S. glaucum is one of the most prevalent soft corals of the family Alcyoniidae. The Red Sea is the native home to 40% of the known 180 species of soft corals.

Soft corals like S. glaucum of the family Alcyonniidae do not have a hard exoskeleton. They are sessile and taxonomically identified by calcareous sclerites on their exoskeletons. Sarcophyton have polyps with eight tentacles. Sarcophyton corals build monospecific colonies, typically found in a range of intertidal, subtidal, and near-shore reef flat habitats. Individual S. glaucum corals grow up to 80 cm (31 in) usually on reef flats, in lagoons and on seaward slopes.

Within the biodiverse and productive organisms of the rough leather coral are many microorganisms which provide benefits to the coral host. The microorganisms living on S. glaucum protect the host against pathogens, while also possibly supplying nutrients to the host.

== Research ==
Coral of the genus Sarcophyton are used often for research in the pharmaceutical industry. S. glaucum is a producer of sarcophytol A, a diterpenoid recognized to possess tumor-inhibiting bioactivity. Analysis of the cembranoids within S. glaucum have shown that they are tumor-inhibiting. The metabolites of S. glaucum were also shown to be antimicrobial, antifungal, and neuroprotective. The study "Bioactive cembranoids from the Red Sea soft coral Sarcophyton glaucum" concluded that several isolated compounds from S. glaucum samples can be further investigated for cancer research and treatment.

Other studies have also shown antibacterial properties of S. glaucum. In a study titled "Phylogenetic diversity and antimicrobial activity of marine bacteria associated with the soft coral Sarcophyton glaucum", the authors investigated the bacterial properties of S. glaucum. The authors found that soft corals like S. glaucum can be used to screen for bacteria that is antibiotic-producing. They identified many antimicrobial properties within the bacteria of S. glaucum, such as bacteria of the phylum Firmicutes, Gamma proteobacteria, and Actinobacteria. Chemical analyses of 16 different species of Sarcophyton revealed a range of other biological activities. S. glaucum has many cembrane terpenes. Terpenes of the genus Sarcophyton protect against insects and pests, inflammation, viruses, and biofouling.

S. glaucum is a prominent coral used in aquaculture. The species S. glaucum can be separated into six clades, differentiated by the sequence analyses of mitochondrial proteins, according to a study by Costa et al. The study "Photobiology and growth of leather coral Sarcophyton cf. glaucum fragments stocked under low light in a recirculated system" tested how changing the intensity of light, a necessary component to sustain coral health and productivity, affects S. glaucum growth and survival. Results from a study of the effects of Photosynthetically Active Radiation (PAR) treatments on S. glaucum stated that the soft coral species was able to grow and survive in low PAR intensities. The photobiology of S. glaucum was not negatively affected in low PAR intensities, while the concentration of coral endosymbionts increased under these conditions. The results suggest that low PAR can be used in ex situ culturing of S. glaucum.
