= Gersemia fruticosa =

- Hedge Carnation Coral (Gersemia fruticosa) in Norway

Conservation status
- Secure (NatureServe)

Scientific classification
- Kingdom: Animalia
- Phylum: Cnidaria
- Subphylum: Anthozoa
- Class: Octocorallia
- Order: Malacalcyonacea
- Family: Alcyoniidae
- Genus: Gersemia
- Species: G. fruticosa

Binomial name
- Gersemia fruticosa Sars, 1860

Synonyms
- Gersemia longiflora Verrill, 1922; Nidalia arctica Danielssen, 1887

Species of coral

Gersemia fruticosa is a species of soft coral in the family Alcyoniidae. It is a deep sea species with a boreal distribution and is found in the northwest Atlantic Ocean, from off the coast of Delaware northward to Baffin Bay and the Davis Strait, and also in the northeast Atlantic Ocean in the Barents Sea.

== Biology ==
Little is known of the reproduction of deep sea corals, especially soft corals, because observation is so difficult at the depths at which they live. Gersemia fruticosa was brought to the surface and maintained in the laboratory under flow-through conditions. Planula larvae were released between April and June, at the time of year when the greatest quantity of phytoplankton was present in the water. The larvae were between 1.5 and 2.5 mm (0.06 and 0.10 in) long and settled and underwent metamorphosis between 3 and 70 days after release. Three months later, the new primary polyps were up to 10 mm (0.4 in) high with a stalk diameter of 1 mm (0.04 in). These juveniles were maintained for over a year but no budding took place, which suggests that this species grows very slowly.

== Research ==
Gersemia fruticosa has been used in the laboratory to study the synthesis of prostaglandins by corals. It has been possible to demonstrate the biosynthesis in vitro in this coral but not in other species studied, and a novel LO pathway or a new COX-isozyme may be involved.
