= Aldersladum nana =

Scientific classification
- Domain: Eukaryota
- Kingdom: Animalia
- Phylum: Cnidaria
- Class: Octocorallia
- Order: Alcyonacea
- Family: Alcyoniidae
- Genus: Aldersladum
- Species: A. nana

Binomial name
- Aldersladum nana (Hickson, 1931)

Species of coral

Aldersladum nana is a species of the genus Aldersladum.
