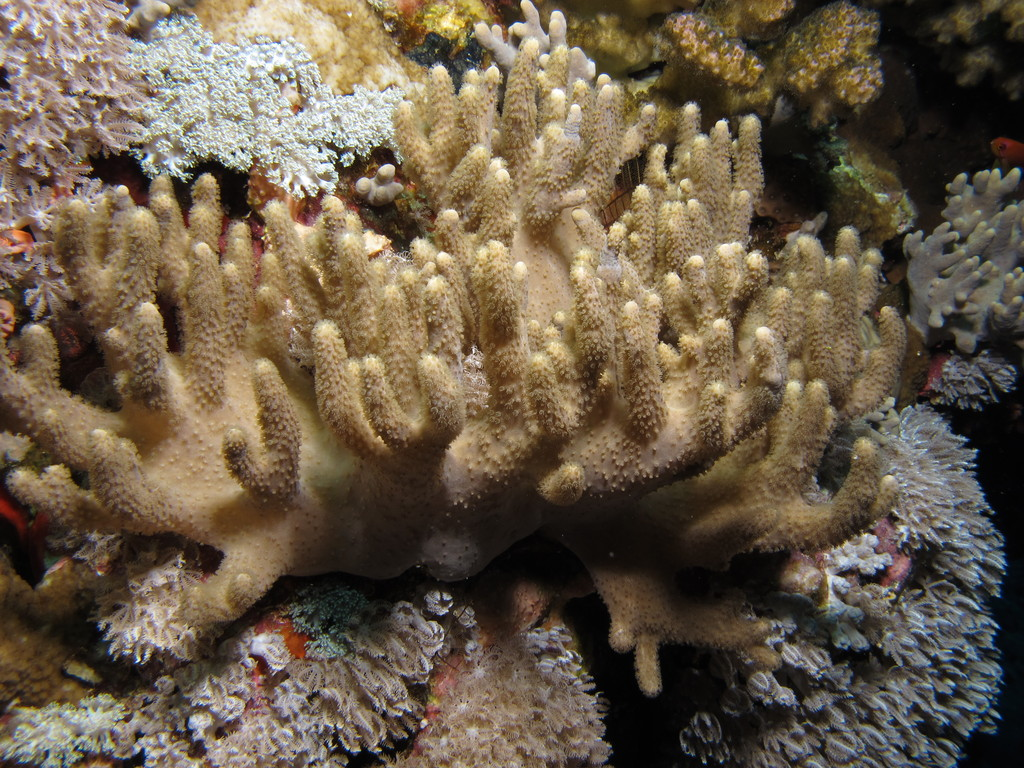
- Sinularia polydactyla in the Red Sea, 2011

Scientific classification
- Kingdom: Animalia
- Phylum: Cnidaria
- Subphylum: Anthozoa
- Class: Octocorallia
- Order: Malacalcyonacea
- Family: Alcyoniidae
- Genus: Sinularia
- Species: S. polydactyla

Binomial name
- Sinularia polydactyla (Ehrenberg, 1834)

= Sinularia polydactyla =

Species of coral

Sinularia polydactyla, known as finger leather coral, is a species of soft coral in the family Alcyoniidae. Bio-active isolates called durumolides have been found in all samples of this coral.
