= Gersemia juliepackardae =

Scientific classification
- Kingdom: Animalia
- Phylum: Cnidaria
- Subphylum: Anthozoa
- Class: Octocorallia
- Order: Malacalcyonacea
- Family: Alcyoniidae
- Genus: Gersemia
- Species: G. juliepackardae

Binomial name
- Gersemia juliepackardae Williams & Lundsten, 2009

Species of cnidarian

Gersemia juliepackardae is a species of soft coral in the family Alcyoniidae. It is found in the northeast Pacific Ocean, on seamounts or on the deep ocean bed. The coral is named in honour of Julie Packard, the executive director of the Monterey Bay Aquarium, for "her dedication to ocean stewardship and conservation, and for elevating public awareness about the ocean environment."

== Description ==
Colonies of Gersemia juliepackardae have an upright main stem and are attached to the substrate by a holdfast. The stalk of the holotype is 88 mm (3.5 in) tall with a width of 40 mm (1.6 in) at the base. Lateral branches start just above the holdfast and are borne mostly in two opposite rows. Each of these lateral branches develop several secondary branchlets near the tip. The non-retractable polyps are tubular in shape and are mostly on the secondary branches. The eight tentacles on each polyp can be retracted into the polyp body. The polyps are about 5 mm (0.2 in) long, the basal part being while and the tentacular part salmon pink. The holdfast and basal part of the stalk are white while the rest of the stalk and the branches are pink.

== Distribution ==
The holotype was collected in 2007 from Pioneer Seamount off the coast of central California, at a depth of approximately 1,000 m (3,281 ft). Other specimens were collected from Rodriguez Seamount off southern California at 889 m (2,917 ft), off the coast of Oregon at 1,600 m (5,249 ft) and off the coast of northern Washington at 879 m (2,884 ft). Observations from a remotely operated underwater vehicle show that most specimens are attached to rock substrates singly, or in small groups, while some grow on dead and living sponges; these may be the first examples known where octocorals in the deep sea are living on sponges.
