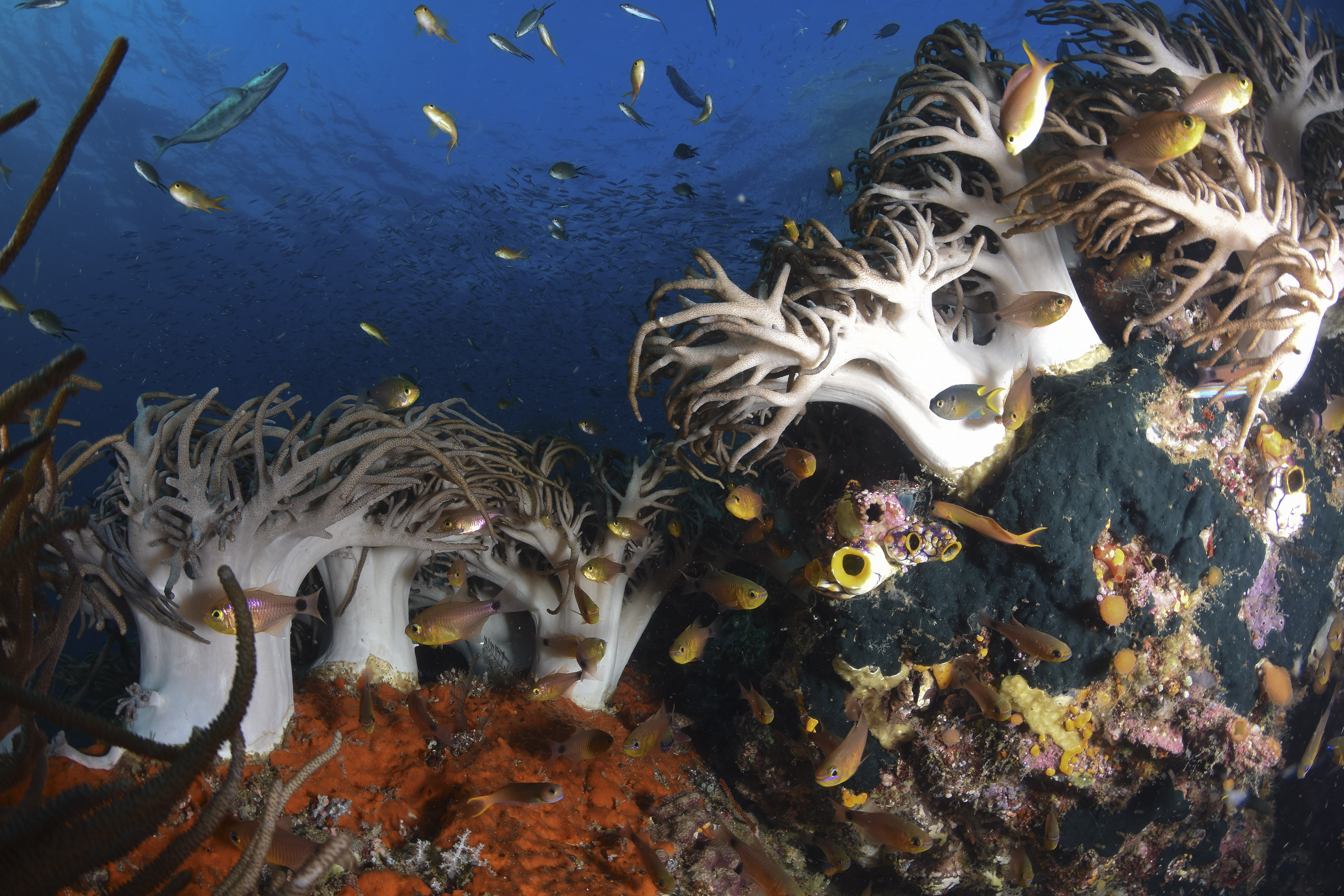

Scientific classification
- Kingdom: Animalia
- Phylum: Cnidaria
- Subphylum: Anthozoa
- Class: Octocorallia
- Order: Malacalcyonacea
- Family: Alcyoniidae
- Genus: Sinularia
- Species: S. flexibilis

Binomial name
- Sinularia flexibilis (Quoy & Gaimard, 1833)
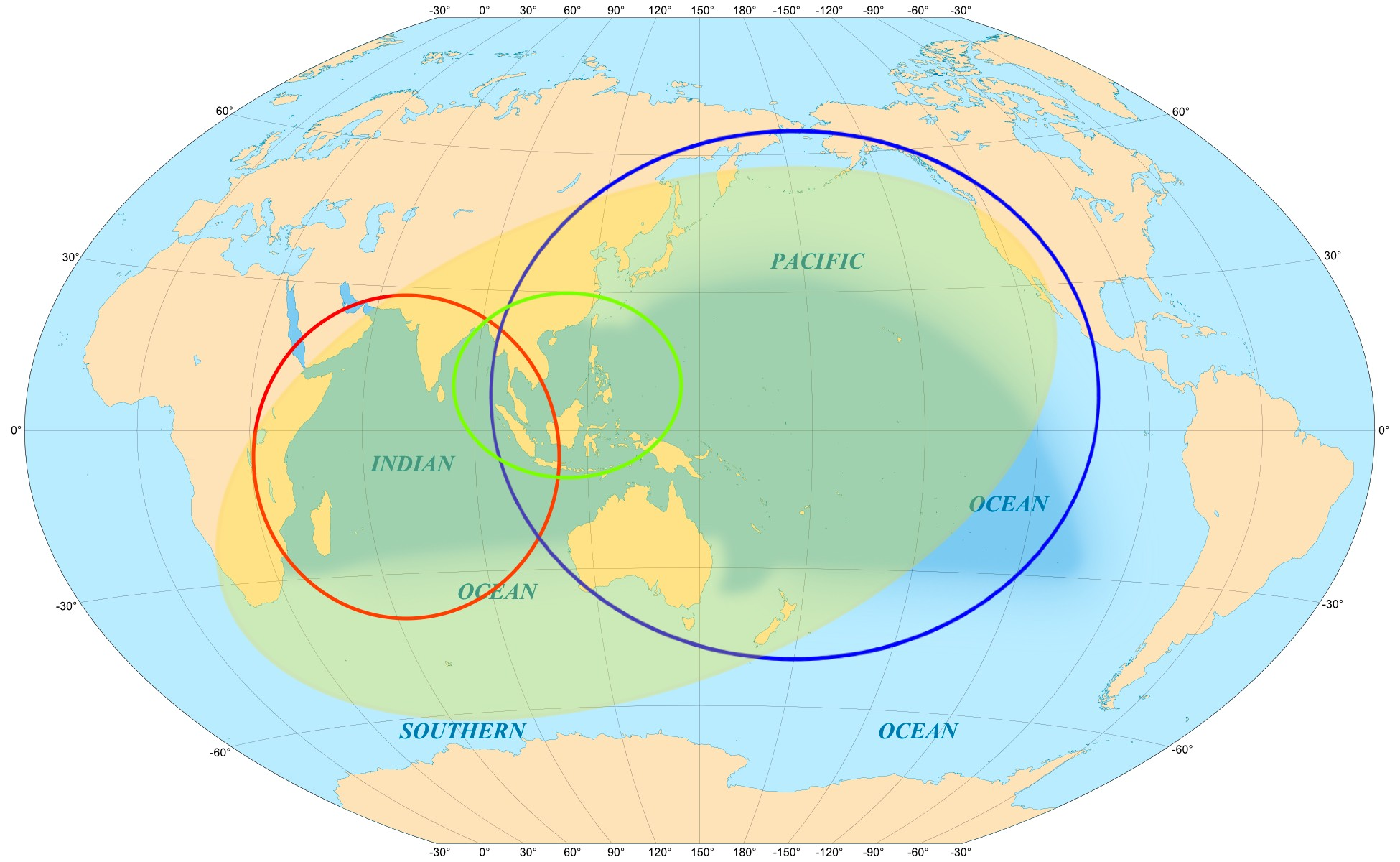

= Sinularia flexibilis =

Species of coral

Sinularia flexibilis is a species of soft coral commonly known as either flexible leather coral, slimy leather coral, or spaghetti finger leather coral. It was first described by Quoy and Gaimard in 1833. The species forms flexible, branching colonies that rely on symbiotic algae called zooxanthellae for energy through photosynthesis. They live in reef environments in the Indo-Pacific region and play an important ecological role in these reef communities. The species is also studied for its production of biologically active compounds with antimicrobial and pharmaceutical potential.

== Description ==
Sinularia flexibilis has a soft, leathery body with flexible lobes extending from a central stalk. It is in the class Octocorallia meaning its polyps display eightfold symmetry. The coral is in the family Alcyoniidae with key characteristics of lacking a calcium carbonate exoskeleton but has an internal skeleton made out of sclerite. This provides the soft coral with structural support and protection. Colonies are usually yellow, brown, or green depending on density of the symbiotic algae. Morphological variation is common within the genus due to environmental influences and species diversity.

== Habitat and Distribution ==
Sinularia flexibilis is found in shallow, tropical environments, specifically in the Indo-Pacific region. This includes coral reef systems off the coast of Southeast Asia and the Great Barrier Reef. They inhabit reef environments between 0-30 meters in depth at salinities between 30-40 PSU and temperatures between 20-30 degrees Celsius. Larvae attach to hard substrates in shallow reef environments. Then the species can form dense aggregations and dominate benthic communities under favorable conditions. Its abundance is influenced by environmental factors. Moderate water flow enhances nutrient exchange and supports growth and photosynthesis.

== Zooxanthellae Symbiosis ==
Sinularia flexibilis have a mutualistic relationship with photosynthetic dinoflagellates called zooxanthellae. The symbiotic algae live within the coral’s tissues and provide energy through photosynthesis, supporting the coral’s growth and metabolic activity. In return, the coral provides the zooxanthellae with protection, access to sunlight, and nutrients derived from its metabolic waste. The efficiency of this relationship is influenced by environmental factors which affect photosynthetic performance and overall coral health.

== Ecology ==
Sinularia flexibilis contributes to reef ecosystems by providing habitat for small marine organisms and influencing community structure. It competes with other benthic organisms for space and can become dominant under certain environmental conditions. Colony growth and survival are size-dependent. Smaller colonies tend to grow more rapidly, but have higher mortality rates, while larger colonies may experience less growth or division.

== Reproduction ==
Sinularia flexibilis reproduces both sexually and asexually. They perform asexual reproduction through fission and fragmentation in order to expand populations. A large proportion of colonies can perform fission at any time. Sexual reproduction is done by synchronized mass spawning with the release of gametes. Sexual reproduction contributes to genetic diversity and dispersal. Genetic studies have shown differentiation among populations, indicating that both reproductive strategies are performed. Population size remains relatively stable despite growth and recruitment due to mortality and environmental disturbance.

== Chemical Defense ==
Sinularia flexibilis produces a variety of secondary metabolites, particularly diterpenes, which function in chemical defense. These compounds help protect the coral from predators, microbial infection, and overgrowth by competing organisms. The chemicals support the coral’s ability to resist fouling by bacteria and algae, improving its competitive success on reefs. Chemical defenses are a common ecological strategy for soft corals and play a key role in shaping reef community structure.

== Biomedical Significance ==
Compounds from Sinularia flexibilis have the potential to be used for biomedical applications. Studies have shown that diterpenes exhibit antimicrobial activity, particularly against Gram-positive bacteria. Other compounds taken from the species have presented anti-inflammatory and cytotoxic properties, suggesting potential use in drug development. These bioactive compounds are part of a broader group of marine natural products being looked at for pharmaceutical use. Recent research indicates that microbial communities associated with Sinularia flexibilis may influence the production of these compounds, further expanding its relevance in marine biotechnology.

== Aquarium Trade ==
Sinularia flexibilis is commonly kept in marine aquariums due to its resilience and adaptability. It can tolerate a range of environmental conditions but requires specific lighting and water flow to support its symbiotic algae. Its resilience makes it a popular species for aquarium hobbyists.
