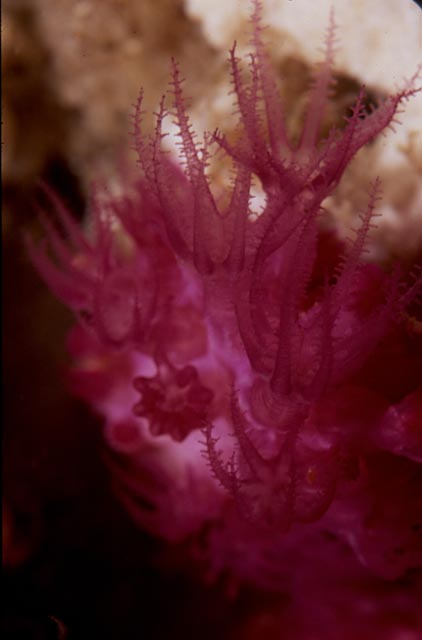

Scientific classification
- Kingdom: Animalia
- Phylum: Cnidaria
- Subphylum: Anthozoa
- Class: Octocorallia
- Order: Malacalcyonacea
- Family: Alcyoniidae
- Genus: Alcyonium
- Species: A. fauri

Binomial name
- Alcyonium fauri Studer, 1910

= Purple soft coral =

Species of coral

The purple soft coral (Alcyonium fauri) is a species of colonial soft coral in the family Alcyoniidae.

== Description ==
Purple soft corals grow in small colonies of up to 3 cm in height. The diameter of the individual polyps is 0.4 cm. They are usually bright purple, although they may be yellow, pink, red, dark grey or orange. The soft colony is encrusting and variably shaped. Feeding polyps extend eight tentacles into the water column.

== Distribution ==
This species is known from Saldanha Bay to Richards Bay off the South African coast, and lives from the low intertidal to 90m under water.

== Ecology ==
This species feeds on microplankton. It is preyed on by the nudibranchs Leminda millecra and two extremely well camouflaged species from the genus Tritonia.
