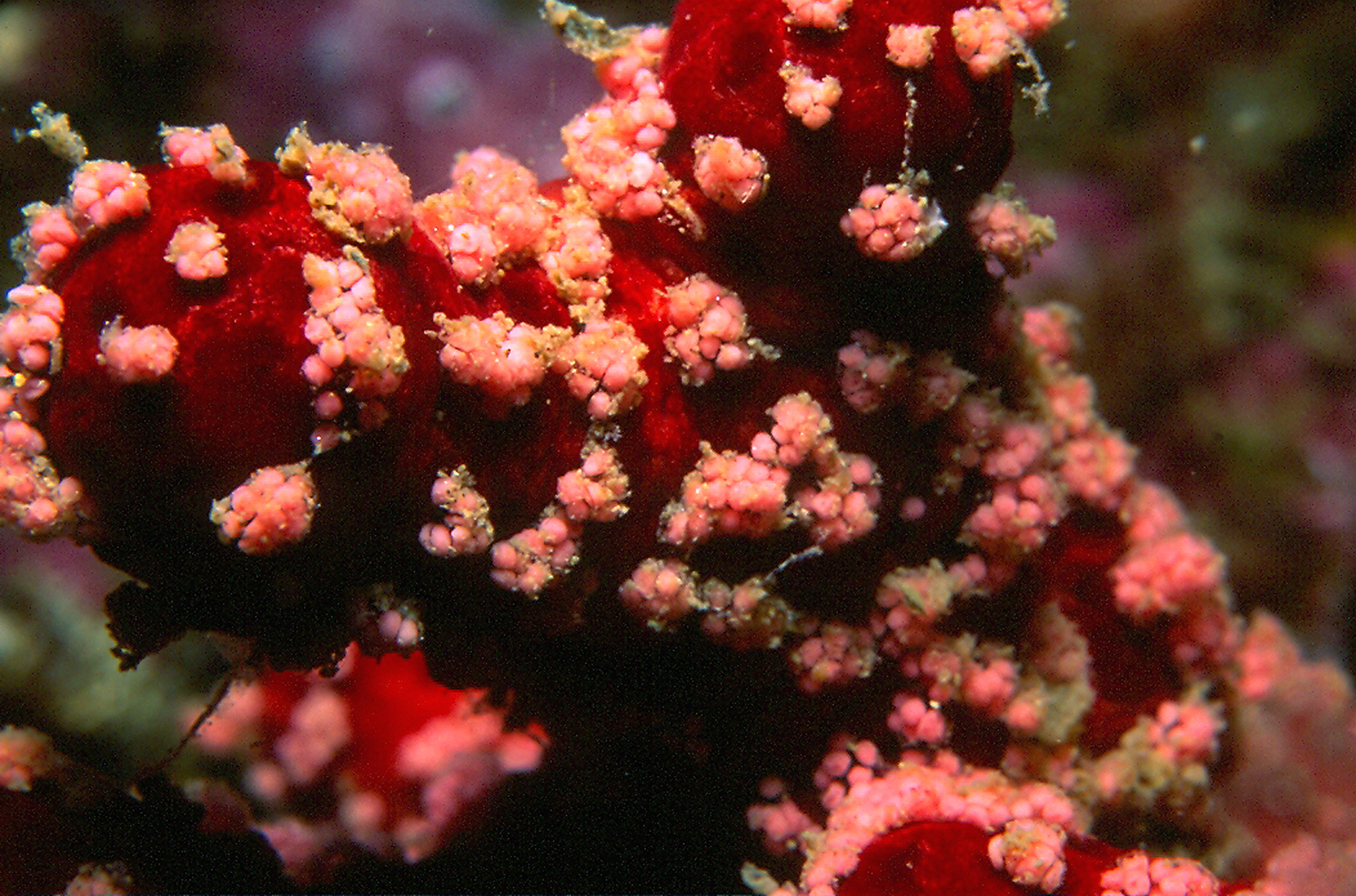

Conservation status
- Least Concern (IUCN 3.1) (Mediterranean)

Scientific classification
- Kingdom: Animalia
- Phylum: Cnidaria
- Subphylum: Anthozoa
- Class: Octocorallia
- Order: Malacalcyonacea
- Family: Alcyoniidae
- Genus: Alcyonium
- Species: A. acaule

Binomial name
- Alcyonium acaule Marion, 1878

= Alcyonium acaule =

Species of coral

Alcyonium acaule is a species of soft coral in the family Alcyoniidae. It is found at moderate depths on shaded rocks in the Mediterranean Sea and adjoining parts of the Atlantic Ocean.

== Description ==
Alcyonium acaule is a colonial coral forming clumps of yellow, pink, brown-red to brown-orange fleshy masses of finger-like lobes. The colony can reach a height of 20 cm. The colony's surface is entirely covered by whitish polyps from the base to the tips of the lobes. As with all soft corals, it relies on its hydrostatic skeleton to maintain its form.

== Distribution and habitat ==
This species is endemic to the Mediterranean Sea, but its range extends slightly into the Atlantic Ocean along the Portuguese and Spanish Atlantic coasts. It is usually found between 12 and 135 m deep. Alcyonium acaule is a sciophilous animal that avoids direct light and prefers shaded areas such as overhangs or caves.

== Ecology ==
In the Mediterranean Sea, Alcyonium acaule frequently forms dense aggregations, often in association with the yellow cluster anemone (Parazoanthus axinellae). Other organisms in these biodiverse habitats include suspension feeders such as sponges, cnidarians, bryozoans and tunicates, and the rock is encrusted with coralline algae. There is competition for space among these organisms. During a two-year research study, a number of small colonies of Alcyonium acaule disappeared, and overall colony growth was minimal. Many colonies reduced feeding activity during the summer, with up to ninety percent becoming dormant.
