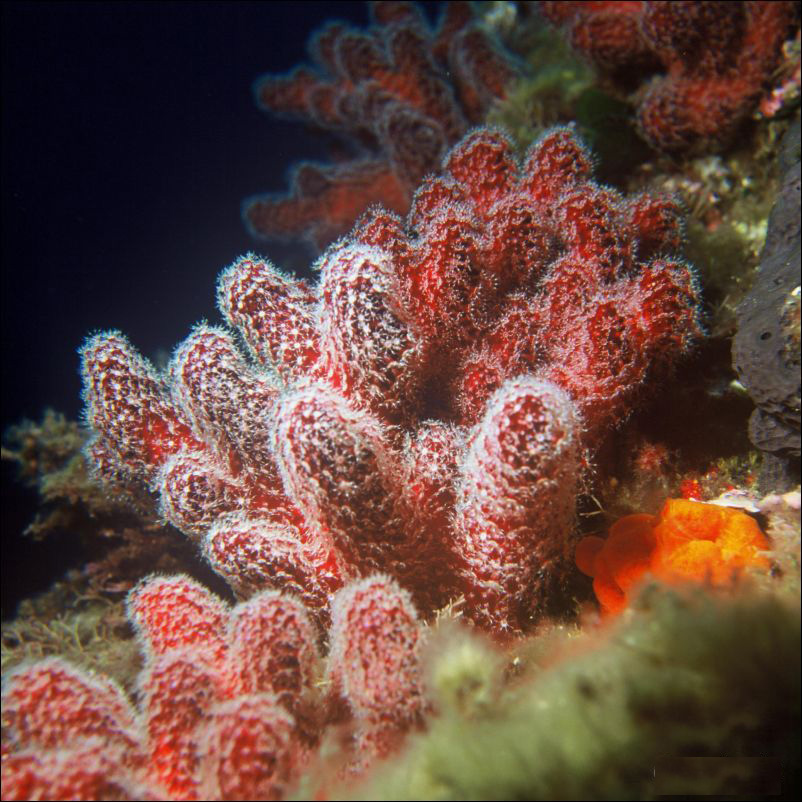

Conservation status
- Least Concern (IUCN 3.1) (Mediterranean)

Scientific classification
- Kingdom: Animalia
- Phylum: Cnidaria
- Subphylum: Anthozoa
- Class: Octocorallia
- Order: Malacalcyonacea
- Family: Alcyoniidae
- Genus: Alcyonium
- Species: A. palmatum

Binomial name
- Alcyonium palmatum Pallas, 1766

= Alcyonium palmatum =

Species of soft coral in the family Alcyoniidae commonly called red dead man's fingers

Alcyonium palmatum or red dead man's fingers is a species of soft coral in the family Alcyoniidae.

== Description ==
Red dead man's fingers is a colonial coral forming clumps of red fleshy masses of finger-like lobes. The surface layer include many sclerites which form a crust. The individual polyps are white and translucent, and project from the leathery surface when feeding, giving the colony a furry appearance. By swallowing or ejecting water an entire colony can expand or shrink considerably.

== Distribution and habitat ==
Red dead man's fingers is found along the Mediterranean and Atlantic coasts of north west Europe from Portugal to Norway. The polyps live in colonies attached to bedrock, boulders, stones and occasionally the shells of crabs and gastropods. They are most plentiful in areas with strong water movement and where there is insufficient sunlight for algae to predominate. They are usually found in the sublittoral zone down to about fifty metres.

== Biology ==
The colonies of red dead man's fingers are nearly always either male or female, although a small number of hermaphrodite colonies are found. Colony growth occurs mainly in the first half of the year with the polyps becoming inactive in late summer, and the base tissue turning reddish or brownish due to the growth of algae and hydroids on the surface. At this time the gonads are developing and spawning occurs in December and January.

The polyps feed at various times of the day with their tentacles extended. They are suspension feeders gathering plankton from the water with the help of cilia, and absorbing oxygen at the same time.
