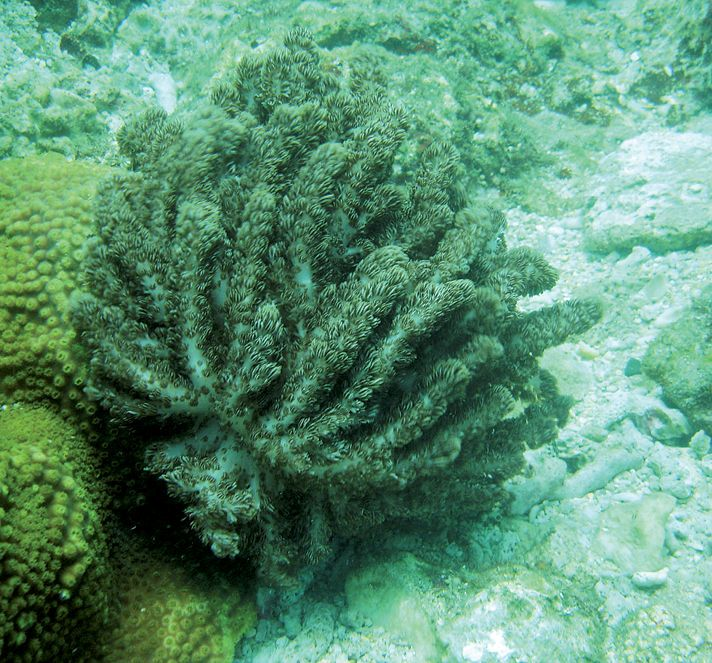

Scientific classification
- Domain: Eukaryota
- Kingdom: Animalia
- Phylum: Cnidaria
- Class: Octocorallia
- Order: Alcyonacea
- Family: Alcyoniidae
- Genus: Aldersladum
- Species: A. jengi

Binomial name
- Aldersladum jengi Benayahu & McFadden, 2011

= Aldersladum jengi =

Species of coral

Aldersladum jengi is a species of the genus Aldersladum.
