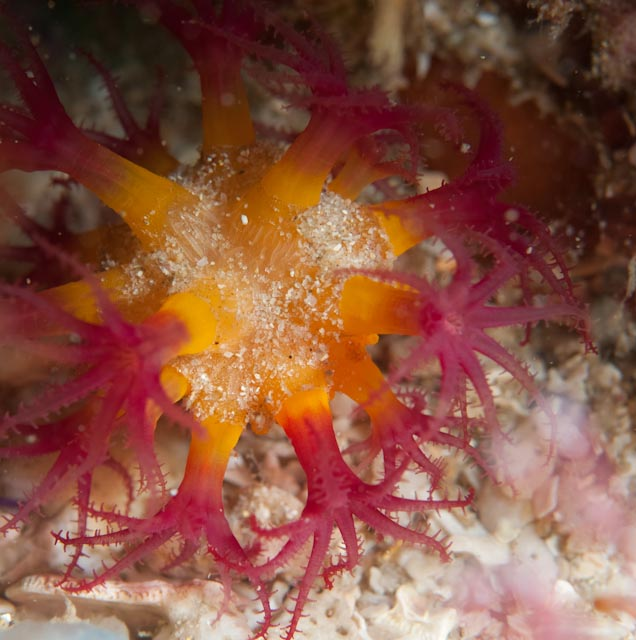

Scientific classification
- Kingdom: Animalia
- Phylum: Cnidaria
- Subphylum: Anthozoa
- Class: Octocorallia
- Order: Malacalcyonacea
- Family: Alcyoniidae
- Genus: Eleutherobia
- Species: E. variabile

Binomial name
- Eleutherobia variabile (Thomson, 1921)

Synonyms
- Alcyonium variabile (J.S. Thomson, 1921); Metalcyonium variabile Thomson, 1921

= Variable soft coral =

Species of soft coral

The variable soft coral (Alcyonium variabile (J.S. Thomson, 1921), previously Eleutherobia variabile) is a species of colonial soft coral in the family Alcyoniidae.

== Description ==
Variable soft corals grow in small colonies of up to 7 cm. They are mushroom-shaped, having a short stalk with a round head covered with feeding polyps. The stalk is of variable height and may also be absent. The colour is extremely variable and may be red, purple, orange, white, yellow or pink and often varies between the colony and the polyps.

== Distribution ==
This species is known from the Cape Peninsula to southern KwaZulu-Natal off the South African coast, and lives from 13-450m under water.

== Ecology ==
This is a common species over its range. Colonies are usually found attached to hard substrates such as rock, shells and even encrusting sponges on vertical walls.
