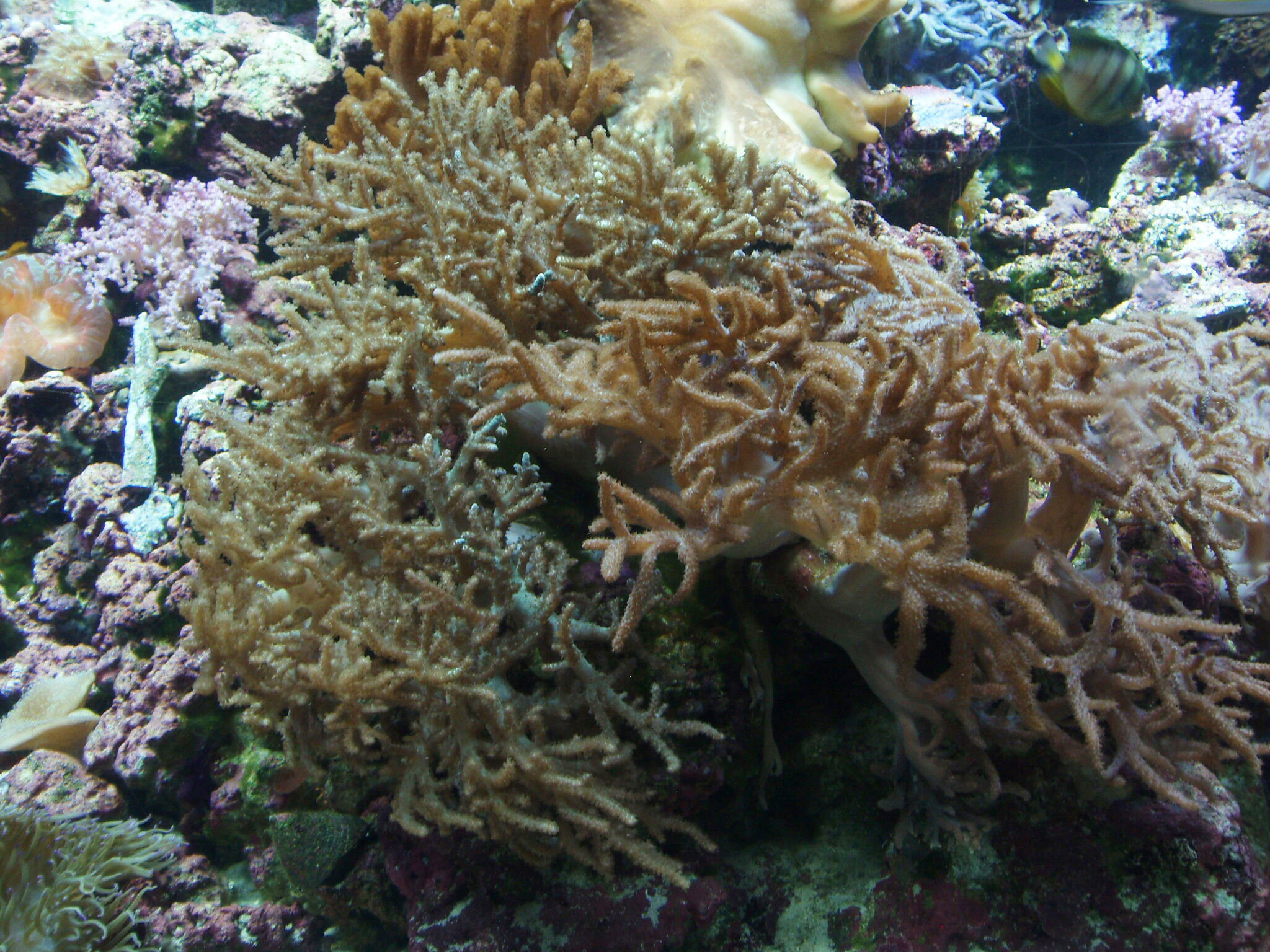
- Sinularia flexibilis

Scientific classification
- Kingdom: Animalia
- Phylum: Cnidaria
- Subphylum: Anthozoa
- Class: Octocorallia
- Order: Malacalcyonacea
- Family: Alcyoniidae
- Genus: Sinularia; May, 1898

= Sinularia =

Genus of corals

Sinularia is a genus of soft coral in the family Alcyoniidae. They are commonly known as leather corals and currently have 166 described species in the genus.

== Species ==
Species include:

- Sinularia abhishiktae van Ofwegen & Vennam, 1991
- Sinularia abrupta Tixier-Durivault, 1970
- Sinularia acetabula Verseveldt & Tursch, 1979
- Sinularia acuta Manuputty & van Ofwegen, 2007
- Sinularia agilis (Tixier-Durivault, 1970)
- Sinularia andamanensis Thomson & Simpson, 1909
- Sinularia anomala Verseveldt & Benayahu, 1983
- Sinularia arborea Verseveldt, 1971
- Sinularia asterolobata Verseveldt, 1977
- Sinularia australiensis van Ofwegen, Benayahu & McFadden, 2013
- Sinularia babeldaobensis van Ofwegen, 2008
- Sinularia barcaformis Verseveldt & Benayahu, 1983
- Sinularia bisulca van Ofwegen, 2008
- Sinularia brassica May, 1898
- Sinularia bremerensis van Ofwegen, 2008
- Sinularia capillosa Tixier-Durivault, 1970
- Sinularia capitalis (Pratt, 1903)
- Sinularia capricornis Dautova, van Ofwegen & Savinkin, 2010
- Sinularia ceramensis Verseveldt, 1977
- Sinularia compacta Tixier-Durivault, 1970
- Sinularia conferta (Dana, 1846)
- Sinularia confusa van Ofwegen, 2008
- Sinularia corpulenta Li Chupu, 1982
- Sinularia corpulentissima Manuputty & van Ofwegen, 2007
- Sinularia crassa Tixier-Durivault, 1945
- Sinularia crebra van Ofwegen, 2008
- Sinularia cristata Tixier-Durivault, 1969
- Sinularia cruciata Tixier-Durivault, 1970
- Sinularia crustaformis Verseveldt & Benayahu, 1983
- Sinularia curvata Manuputty & van Ofwegen, 2007
- Sinularia dactyloclados Verseveldt & Benayahu, 1983
- Sinularia deformis Tixier-Durivault, 1969
- Sinularia densa (Whitelegge, 1897)
- Sinularia depressa Tixier-Durivault, 1970
- Sinularia diffusa van Ofwegen, 2008
- Sinularia digitata van Ofwegen, 2008
- Sinularia discrepens Tixier-Durivault, 1970
- Sinularia dissecta Tixier-Durivault, 1945
- Sinularia eilatensis van Ofwegen, Benayahu & McFadden, 2013
- Sinularia elongata Tixier-Durivault, 1970
- Sinularia erecta Tixier-Durivault, 1945
- Sinularia exilis Tixier-Durivault, 1970
- Sinularia facile Tixier-Durivault, 1970
- Sinularia fibrilla Lai & Long, 1981
- Sinularia fibrillosa Li Chupu, 1982
- Sinularia finitima van Ofwegen, 2008
- Sinularia firma Tixier-Durivault, 1970
- Sinularia fishelsoni Verseveldt, 1970
- Sinularia flabelliclavata Verseveldt & Benayahu, 1983
- Sinularia flaccida van Ofwegen, 2008
- Sinularia flexibilis (Quoy & Gaimard, 1833)
- Sinularia flexuosa Tixier-Durivault, 1945
- Sinularia foliata van Ofwegen, 2008
- Sinularia foveolata Verseveldt, 1974
- Sinularia frondosa Verseveldt, 1978
- Sinularia fungoides Thomson & Henderson, 1906
- Sinularia gardineri (Pratt, 1903)
- Sinularia gaveshaniae Alderslade & Shirwaiker, 1991
- Sinularia gaweli Verseveldt, 1978
- Sinularia gibberosa Tixier-Durivault, 1970
- Sinularia gonatodes Kolonko, 1926
- Sinularia grandilobata Verseveldt, 1980
- Sinularia granosa Tixier-Durivault, 1970
- Sinularia gravis Tixier-Durivault, 1970
- Sinularia grayi Tixier-Durivault, 1945
- Sinularia gyrosa (Klunzinger, 1877)
- Sinularia halversoni Verseveldt, 1974
- Sinularia heterospiculata Verseveldt, 1970
- Sinularia hirta (Pratt, 1903)
- Sinularia humesi Verseveldt, 1968
- Sinularia humilis van Ofwegen, 2008
- Sinularia incompleta Verseveldt & Benayahu, 1983
- Sinularia inelegans Tixier-Durivault, 1970
- Sinularia inexplicita Tixier-Durivault, 1970
- Sinularia inflata Tixier-Durivault, 1970
- Sinularia jasminae Alderslade & Shirwaiker, 1991
- Sinularia kavarattiensis Alderslade & Shirwaiker, 1991
- Sinularia kotanianensis Manuputty & van Ofwegen, 2007
- Sinularia lamellata Versevedt & Tursch, 1979
- Sinularia laminilobata Malyutin, 1990
- Sinularia larsonae Verseveldt & Alderslade, 1982
- Sinularia leptoclados (Ehrenberg, 1834)
- Sinularia levi Ofwegen, McFadden & Benayahu, 2016
- Sinularia licroclados Verseveldt & Benayahu, 1983
- Sinularia linnei van Ofwegen, 2008
- Sinularia lochmodes Kolonko, 1926
- Sinularia longula Manuputty & van Ofwegen, 2007
- Sinularia loyai Verseveldt & Benayahu, 1983
- Sinularia luxuriosa van Ofwegen, 2008
- Sinularia macrodactyla Kolonko, 1926
- Sinularia macropodia (Hickson & Hiles, 1900)
- Sinularia mammifera Malyutin, 1990
- Sinularia manaarensis Verseveldt, 1980
- Sinularia marenzelleri (Wright & Studer, 1899)
- Sinularia mauritiana Vennam & Parulekar, 1994
- Sinularia maxima Verseveldt, 1971
- Sinularia mayi Lüttschwager, 1914
- Sinularia megalosclera Alderslade, 1987
- Sinularia mesophotica Benayahu, McFadden, Shoham & Ofwegen, 2017
- Sinularia microclavata Tixier-Durivault, 1970
- Sinularia microspiculata Tixier-Durivault, 1970
- Sinularia minima Verseveldt, 1971
- Sinularia mira Tixier-Durivault, 1970
- Sinularia molesta Tixier-Durivault, 1970
- Sinularia mollis Kolonko, 1926
- Sinularia molokaiensis Verseveldt, 1983
- Sinularia monstrosa Li Chupu, 1982
- Sinularia multiflora Dautova, van Ofwegen & Savinkin, 2010
- Sinularia muqeblae Verseveldt & Benayahu, 1983
- Sinularia muralis May, 1899
- Sinularia nanolobata Verseveldt, 1977
- Sinularia notanda Tixier-Durivault, 1966
- Sinularia numerosa Tixier-Durivault, 1970
- Sinularia ornata Tixier-Durivault, 1970
- Sinularia ovispiculata Tixier-Durivault, 1970
- Sinularia papillosa Li Chupu, 1982
- Sinularia papula van Ofwegen, 2008
- Sinularia parulekari Alderslade & Shirwaiker, 1991
- Sinularia parva Tixier-Durivault, 1970
- Sinularia paulae Benayahu, 1998
- Sinularia pavida Tixier-Durivault, 1970
- Sinularia peculiaris Tixier-Durivault, 1970
- Sinularia pedunculata Tixier-Durivault, 1945
- Sinularia platylobata van Ofwegen & Benayahu, 1992
- Sinularia platysma Alderslade & Baxter, 1987
- Sinularia polydactyla (Ehrenberg, 1834)
- Sinularia portieri Verseveldt, 1980
- Sinularia prattae Verseveldt, 1974
- Sinularia procera Verseveldt, 1977
- Sinularia prodigiosa Verseveldt, 1977
- Sinularia pumila Dautova, van Ofwegen & Savinkin, 2010
- Sinularia querciformis (Pratt, 1903)
- Sinularia ramosa Tixier-Durivault, 1945
- Sinularia recurvata Verseveldt & Benayahu, 1983
- Sinularia rigida (Dana, 1846)
- Sinularia robusta Macfadyen, 1936
- Sinularia sandensis Verseveldt, 1977
- Sinularia sarmentosa Dautova, van Ofwegen & Savinkin, 2010
- Sinularia scabra Tixier-Durivault, 1970
- Sinularia schleyeri Benayahu, 1993
- Sinularia schumacheri Verseveldt & Benayahu, 1983
- Sinularia shlagmani Benayahu & van Ofwegen, 2012
- Sinularia siaesensis van Ofwegen, 2008
- Sinularia sipalosa Long, Zheng & Zheng, 1981
- Sinularia slieringsi van Ofwegen & Vennam, 1994
- Sinularia sobolifera Verseveldt & Tursch, 1979
- Sinularia sublimis van Ofwegen, 2008
- Sinularia tenella Li Chupu, 1982
- Sinularia terspilli Verseveldt, 1971
- Sinularia tessieri Benayahu & van Ofwegen, 2012
- Sinularia torta Dautova, van Ofwegen & Savinkin, 2010
- Sinularia triangula Tixier-Durivault, 1970
- Sinularia ultima van Ofwegen, 2008
- Sinularia uniformis van Ofwegen, 2008
- Sinularia uva Dautova, van Ofwegen & Savinkin, 2010
- Sinularia vanderlandi van Ofwegen, 2001
- Sinularia variabilis Tixier-Durivault, 1945
- Sinularia venusta Tixier-Durivault, 1970
- Sinularia verruca van Ofwegen, 2008
- Sinularia verrucosa Tixier-Durivault, 1970
- Sinularia verseveldti van Ofwegen, 1996
- Sinularia vervoorti Verseveldt, 1977
- Sinularia vrijmoethi Verseveldt, 1971
- Sinularia whiteleggei Lüttschwager, 1914
- Sinularia woodyensis van Ofwegen, 2008
- Sinularia yamazotoi Benayahu, 1995
