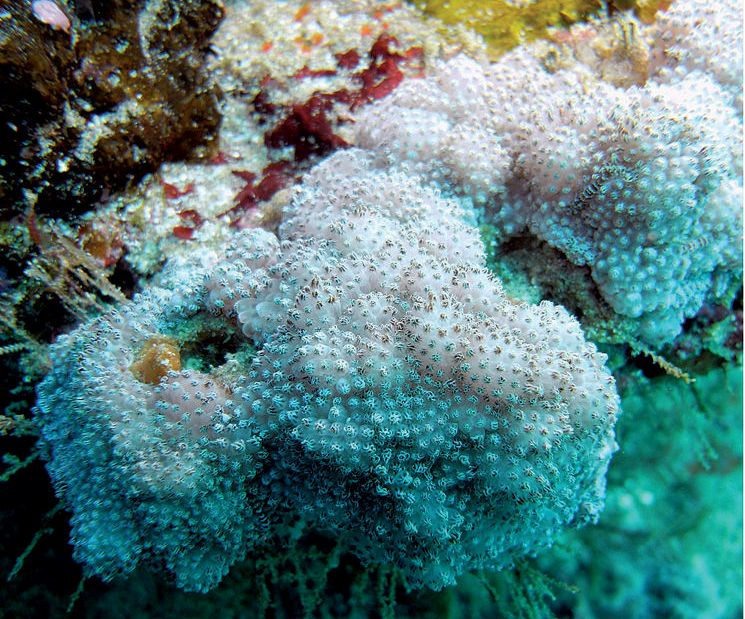

Scientific classification
- Domain: Eukaryota
- Kingdom: Animalia
- Phylum: Cnidaria
- Class: Octocorallia
- Order: Alcyonacea
- Family: Alcyoniidae
- Genus: Aldersladum
- Species: A. sodwanum

Binomial name
- Aldersladum sodwanum (Benayahu, 1993)

= Aldersladum sodwanum =

Species of coral

Aldersladum sodwanum is a species of the genus Aldersladum
