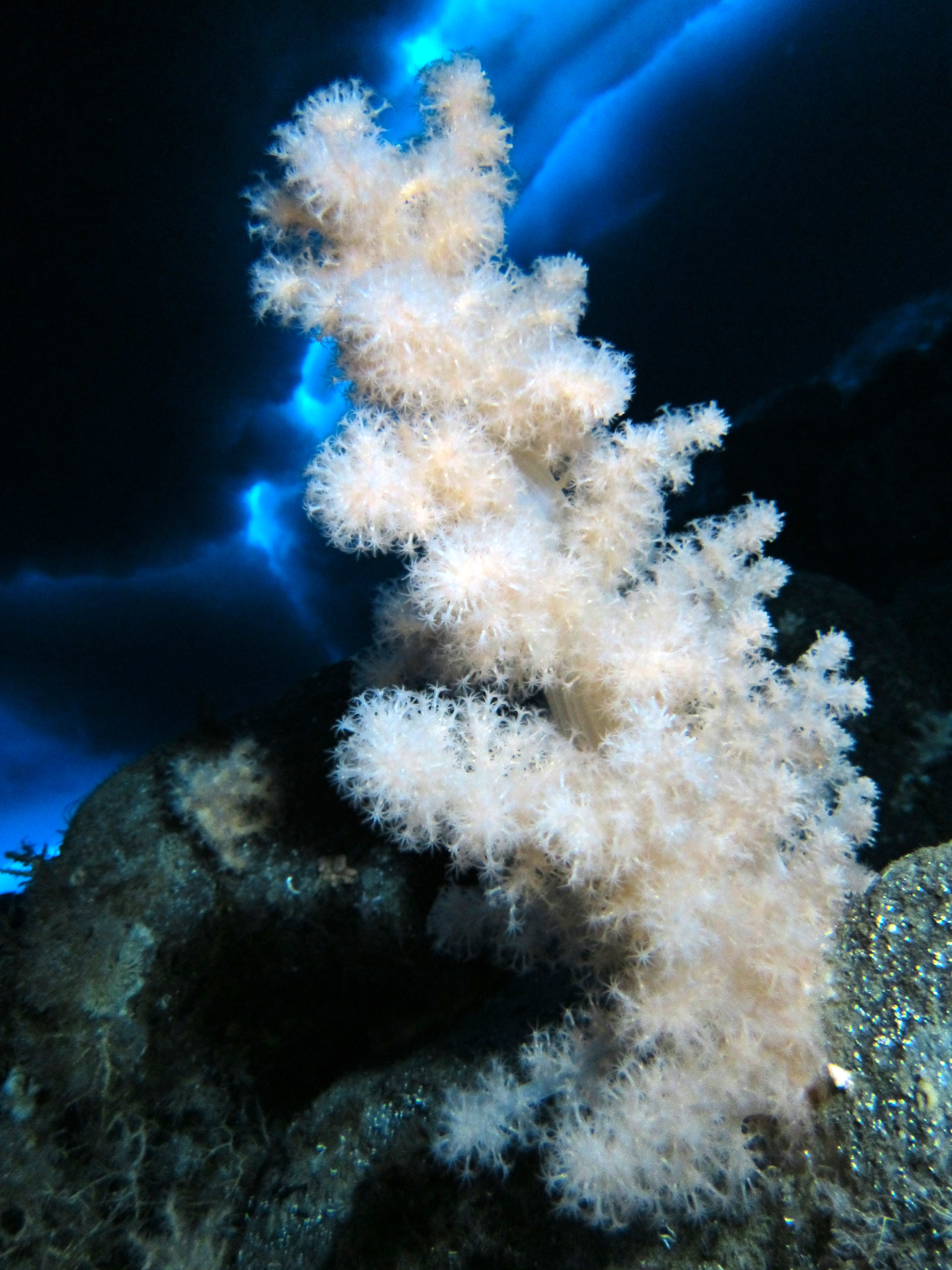
- Gersemia antarctica

Scientific classification
- Kingdom: Animalia
- Phylum: Cnidaria
- Subphylum: Anthozoa
- Class: Octocorallia
- Order: Malacalcyonacea
- Family: Alcyoniidae
- Genus: Gersemia; Marenzeller, 1877

Species
- See text

= Gersemia =

Genus of corals

Gersemia is a genus of soft corals in the family Alcyoniidae. Species in this genus are found in cold temperate and polar seas at depths ranging from 20 metres (66 ft) to over 2,000 metres (6,600 ft). The type species is Gersemia loricata.

== Characteristics ==
Colonies of Gersemia are arborescent, growing erectly with one main stem. The polyps are most numerous at the branch tips and are unable to retract into the calyces. The walls of the stalk and branches are stiffened with sclerites which are often brightly coloured. Corals in this genus do not contain zooxanthellae, the microalgae symbionts found in some other corals.

== Species ==
The World Register of Marine Species includes the following species in the genus:

- Gersemia antarctica (Kükenthal, 1902)
- Gersemia carnea Verrill
- Gersemia clavata (Danielssen, 1887)
- Gersemia crassa (Danielssen, 1887)
- Gersemia danielsseni (Studer, 1891)
- Gersemia fruticosa Sars, 1860
- Gersemia hicksoni (Gravier, 1913)
- Gersemia japonica (Kükenthal, 1906)
- Gersemia juliepackardae Williams & Lundsten, 2009
- Gersemia lambi Williams, 2013
- Gersemia liltvedi (Verseveldt & Williams, 1988)
- Gersemia loricata von Marenzeller, 1878
- Gersemia marenzelleri Kükenthal, 1906
- Gersemia mirabilis (Danielssen, 1887)
- Gersemia rubiformis (Ehrenberg, 1834)
- Gersemia studeri Verrill
- Gersemia uvaeformis (May, 1900)
