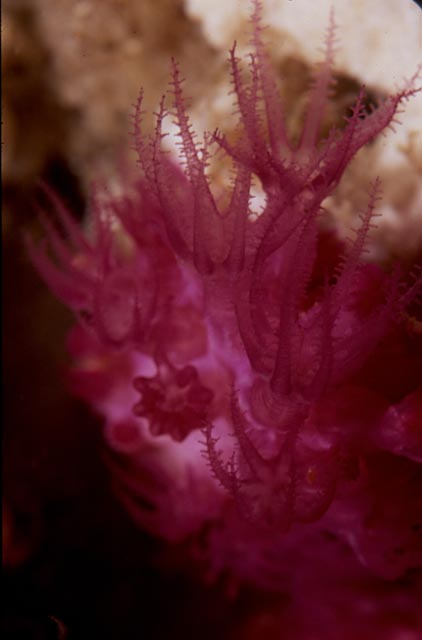
- Alcyonium fauri

Scientific classification
- Kingdom: Animalia
- Phylum: Cnidaria
- Subphylum: Anthozoa
- Class: Octocorallia
- Order: Malacalcyonacea
- Family: Alcyoniidae
- Genus: Alcyonium; Linnaeus, 1758

Species
- See text

= Alcyonium =

Genus of corals

Alcyonium is a genus of soft corals in the family Alcyoniidae and class octocorallia. Alcyonium generally called as dead men's finger.

Introduction

Alcyonium or dead man's fingers is a species of soft coral in the family Alcyoniidae. It is found around the coasts of the northern Atlantic Ocean and other temperate waters such as the South Pacific.

== Species ==
Species in the genus include:

- Alcyonium acaule Marion, 1878
- Alcyonium adriaticum Kükenthal, 1909
- Alcyonium altum Tixier-Durivault, 1955
- Alcyonium antarcticum Wright & studer, 1889
- Alcyonium aspiculatum Tixier-Durivault, 1955
- Alcyonium aurantiacum Quoy & Gaimard, 1834
- Alcyonium bocagei (Saville Kent, 1870)
- Alcyonium bosphorense Tixier-Durivault, 1961
- Alcyonium brioniense Kükenthal, 1907
- Alcyonium burmedju Sampaio, Stokvis & Ofwegen, 2016
- Alcyonium bursa Linnaeus, 1758
- Alcyonium capitatum (Pfeffer, 1889)
- Alcyonium catalai Tixier-Durivault, 1970
- Alcyonium ceylonense May, 1899
- Alcyonium clavatum Studer, 1890
- Alcyonium compactofestucum Verseveldt & van Ofwegen, 1992
- Alcyonium confertum Boone, 1938
- Alcyonium coralloides (Pallas, 1766)
- Alcyonium cydonium Linnaeus, 1767 sensu Esper, 1829
- Alcyonium dendroides Thomson & Dean, 1931
- Alcyonium digitatum Linnaeus, 1758
- Alcyonium dolium McFadden & Ofwegen, 2017
- Alcyonium echinatum Tixier-Durivault, 1970
- Alcyonium elegans (Kukenthal, 1902)
- Alcyonium etheridgei Thomson & Mackinnon, 1911
- Alcyonium faura J. S. Thomson, 1910
- Alcyonium fauri Studer, 1910
- Alcyonium flabellum Quoy & Gaimard, 1834
- Alcyonium foliatum J. S. Thomson, 1921
- Alcyonium fulvum (Forskål, 1775)
- Alcyonium fungiforme Tixier Durivault, 1954
- Alcyonium glaciophilum van Ofwegen, Häussermann & Försterra, 2007
- Alcyonium glomeratum (Hassal, 1843)
- Alcyonium grandis Casas, Ramil & van Ofwegen, 1997
- Alcyonium graniferum Tixier-Durivault & d'Hondt, 1974
- Alcyonium haddoni Wright & Studer, 1889
- Alcyonium hibernicum (Renouf, 1931)
- Alcyonium jorgei van Ofwegen, Häussermann & Försterra, 2007
- Alcyonium luteum Tixier Durivault, 1954
- Alcyonium manusdiaboli Linnaeus, 1767
- Alcyonium maristenebrosi Stiasny, 1937
- Alcyonium megasclerum Stokvis & van Ofwegen, 2007
- Alcyonium muricatum Yamada, 1950
- Alcyonium pacificum Yamada, 1950
- Alcyonium palmatum Pallas, 1766
- Alcyonium patagonicum (May, 1899)
- Alcyonium paucilobulatum Casas, Ramil & van Ofwegen, 1997
- Alcyonium pobeguini Tixier-Durivault, 1955
- Alcyonium profundum Stokvis & van Ofwegen, 2007
- Alcyonium repens Stiasny, 1941
- Alcyonium reptans Kükenthal, 1906
- Alcyonium robustum Utinomi, 1976
- Alcyonium roseum van Ofwegen, Häussermann & Försterra, 2007
- Alcyonium rotiferum Thomson, 1910
- Alcyonium senegalense Verseveldt & van Ofwegen, 1992
- Alcyonium sidereum Verrill, 1922
- Alcyonium sollasi Wright & Studer, 1889
- Alcyonium southgeorgiensis Casas, Ramil & van Ofwegen, 1997
- Alcyonium spitzbergense Verseveldt & van Ofwegen, 1992
- Alcyonium submurale Ridley, 1883
- Alcyonium varum McFadden & van Ofwegen, 2013
- Alcyonium verseveldti Benayahu, 1982
- Alcyonium yepayek van Ofwegen, Häussermann & Försterra, 2007
