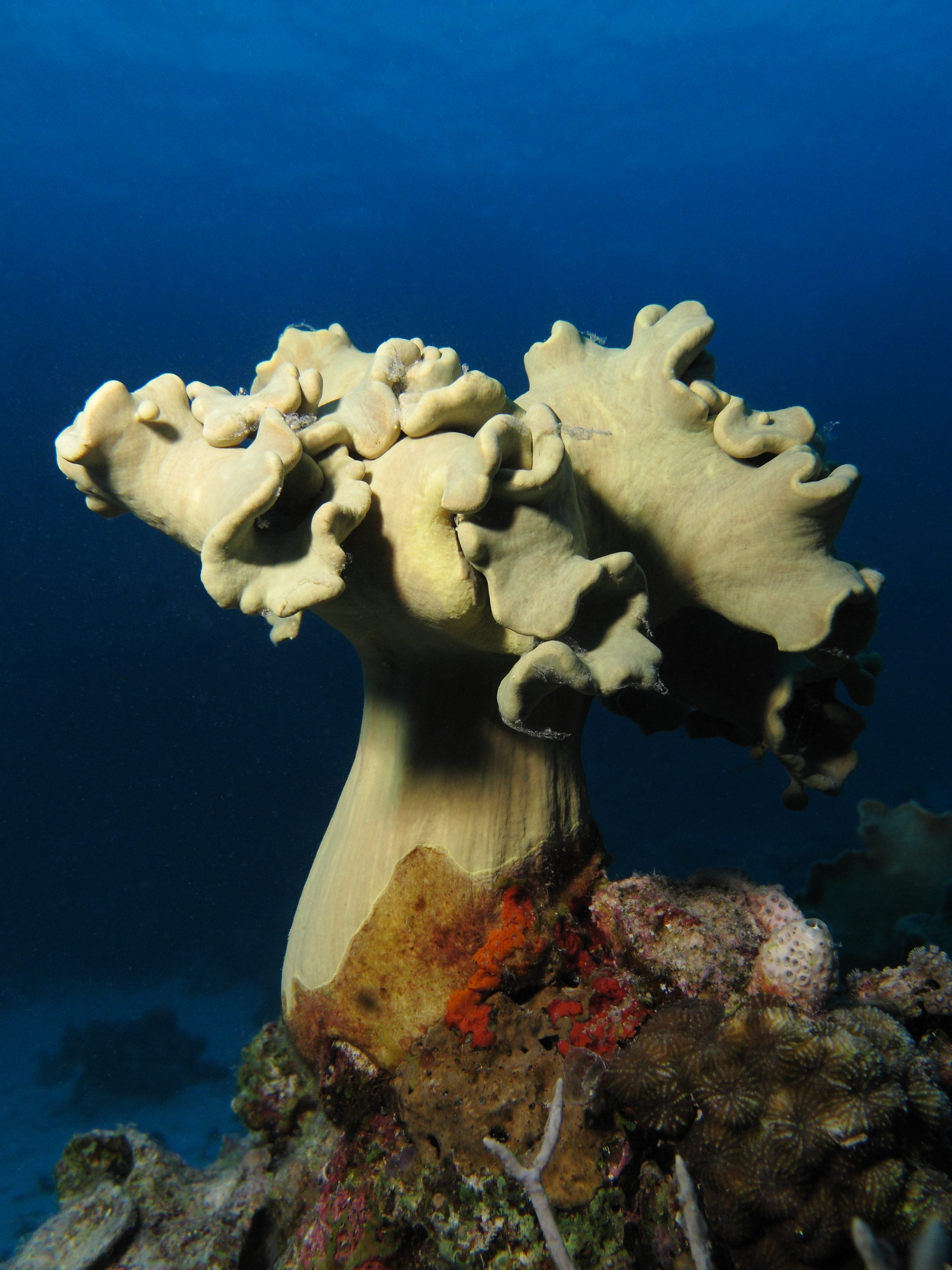
- S. glaucum (tentacles withdrawn)

Scientific classification
- Kingdom: Animalia
- Phylum: Cnidaria
- Subphylum: Anthozoa
- Class: Octocorallia
- Order: Malacalcyonacea
- Family: Alcyoniidae
- Genus: Sarcophyton; Lesson, 1834

Synonyms
- Sarcophytum (lapsus)

= Sarcophyton (coral) =

Genus of corals

Sarcophyton is a genus of soft corals in the family Alcyoniidae that are commonly kept in reef aquaria. Sarcophyton produces the toxic terpene macrolide sarcophytoxide which serves as an antifeedant and also provides advantage in competition with other corals as it reduces photosynthesis of the coral Acropora formosa's endosymbionts. However, the false cowry Ovula ovum is a predator of Sarcophyton, with a probable ability to detoxify sarcophytoxide in its intestines.

== Species ==
The following species currently are classified in the genus Sarcophyton:

- Sarcophyton aalbersbergi Feussner & Waqa, 2013
- Sarcophyton acutangulum (v. Marenzeller, 1886)
- Sarcophyton acutum Tixier-Durivault, 1970
- Sarcophyton agaricum (Stimpson, 1855)
- Sarcophyton aldersladei Feussner & Waqa, 2013
- Sarcophyton alexanderi Feussner & Waqa, 2013
- Sarcophyton auritum Verseveldt & Benayahu, 1978
- Sarcophyton birkelandi Verseveldt, 1978
- Sarcophyton boettgeri Schenk, 1896
- Sarcophyton boletiforme Tixier-Durivault, 1958
- Sarcophyton buitendijki Verseveldt, 1982
- Sarcophyton cherbonnieri Tixier-Durivault, 1958
- Sarcophyton cinereum Tixier-Durivault, 1946
- Sarcophyton contortum Pratt, 1905
- Sarcophyton cornispiculatum Verseveldt, 1971
- Sarcophyton crassocaule Moser, 1919
- Sarcophyton crassum Tixier-Durivault, 1946
- Sarcophyton digitatum Moser, 1919
- Sarcophyton ehrenbergi (v. Marenzeller, 1886)
- Sarcophyton elegans Moser, 1919
- Sarcophyton expandum Kõlliker
- Sarcophyton flexuosum Tixier-Durivault, 1966
- Sarcophyton furcatum Li, 1984
- Sarcophyton gemmatum Verseveldt & Benayahu, 1978
- Sarcophyton glaucum (Quoy & Gaimard, 1833)
- Sarcophyton griffini Moser, 1919
- Sarcophyton infundibuliforme Tixier-Durivault, 1958
- Sarcophyton latum (Dana, 1846)
- Sarcophyton mililatensis Verseveldt & Tursch, 1979
- Sarcophyton minusculum Samimi Namin & van Ofwegen, 2009
- Sarcophyton nanwanensis Benayahu & Perkol-Finkel, 2004
- Sarcophyton nigrum May, 1899
- Sarcophyton pauciplicatum Verseveldt & Benayahu, 1978
- Sarcophyton portentosum Tixier-Durivault, 1970
- Sarcophyton pulchellum (Tixier-Durivault, 1957)
- Sarcophyton regulare Tixier-Durivault, 1946
- Sarcophyton roseum Pratt, 1903
- Sarcophyton serenei Tixier-Durivault, 1958
- Sarcophyton skeltoni Feussner & Waqa, 2013
- Sarcophyton soapiae Feussner & Waqa, 2013
- Sarcophyton solidum Tixier-Durivault, 1958
- Sarcophyton spinospiculatum Alderslade & Shirwaiker, 1991
- Sarcophyton spongiosum Thomson & Dean, 1931
- Sarcophyton stellatum Kükenthal, 1910
- Sarcophyton stolidotum Verseveldt, 1971
- Sarcophyton subviride Tixier-Durivault, 1958
- Sarcophyton tenuispiculatum (Thomson & Dean, 1931)
- Sarcophyton tortuosum Tixier-Durivault, 1946
- Sarcophyton trocheliophorum von Marenzeller, 1886
- Sarcophyton tumulosum Benayahu & van Ofwegen, 2009
- Sarcophyton turschi Verseveldt, 1976
