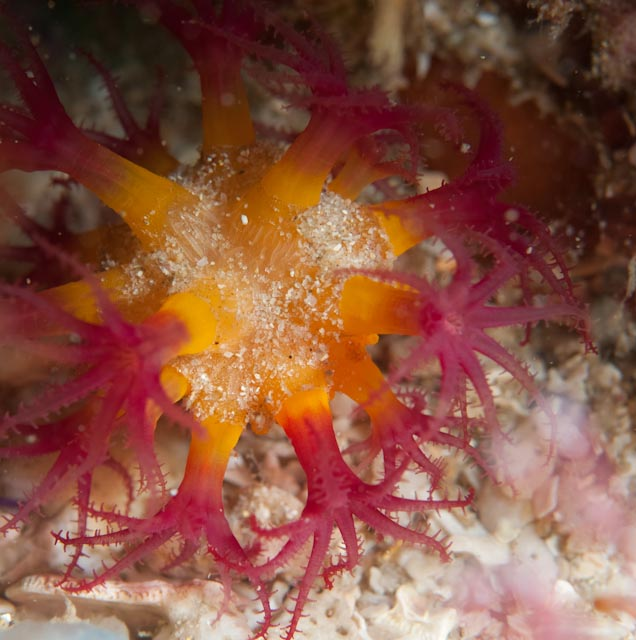
- Eleutherobia variabile

Scientific classification
- Kingdom: Animalia
- Phylum: Cnidaria
- Subphylum: Anthozoa
- Class: Octocorallia
- Order: Malacalcyonacea
- Family: Alcyoniidae
- Genus: Eleutherobia; Puetter, 1900

Species
- See text

= Eleutherobia =

Genus of corals

Eleutherobia is a genus of soft corals in the family Alcyoniidae.

== Species ==
Species in the genus include:

- Eleutherobia australiensis Bryce, Poliseno, Alderslade & Vargas, 2015
- Eleutherobia dofleini (Kükenthal, 1906)
- Eleutherobia duriuscula (Thomson & Dean, 1931)
- Eleutherobia flava (Nutting, 1912)
- Eleutherobia grandiflora (Kükenthal, 1906)
- Eleutherobia imaharai Bryce, Poliseno, Alderslade & Vargas, 2015
- Eleutherobia lutea Benayahu & Schleyer, 1995
- Eleutherobia rigida (Pütter, 1900)
- Eleutherobia rubra (Brundin, 1896)
- Eleutherobia somaliensis Verseveldt & Bayer, 1988
- Eleutherobia splendens (Thomson & Dean, 1931)
- Eleutherobia studeri (J.S. Thomson, 1910)
- Eleutherobia sumbawaensis Verseveldt & Bayer, 1988
- Eleutherobia unicolor (Kükenthal, 1906)
- Eleutherobia variabile (Thomson, 1921)
- Eleutherobia vinadigitaria Williams & Little, 2001

synonyms

- Eleutherobia aurea Benayahu & Schleyer, 1995, accepted as Parasphaerasclera aurea (Benayahu & Schleyer, 1995)
