= Julie Packard =

American marine conservationist (born 1952/53)

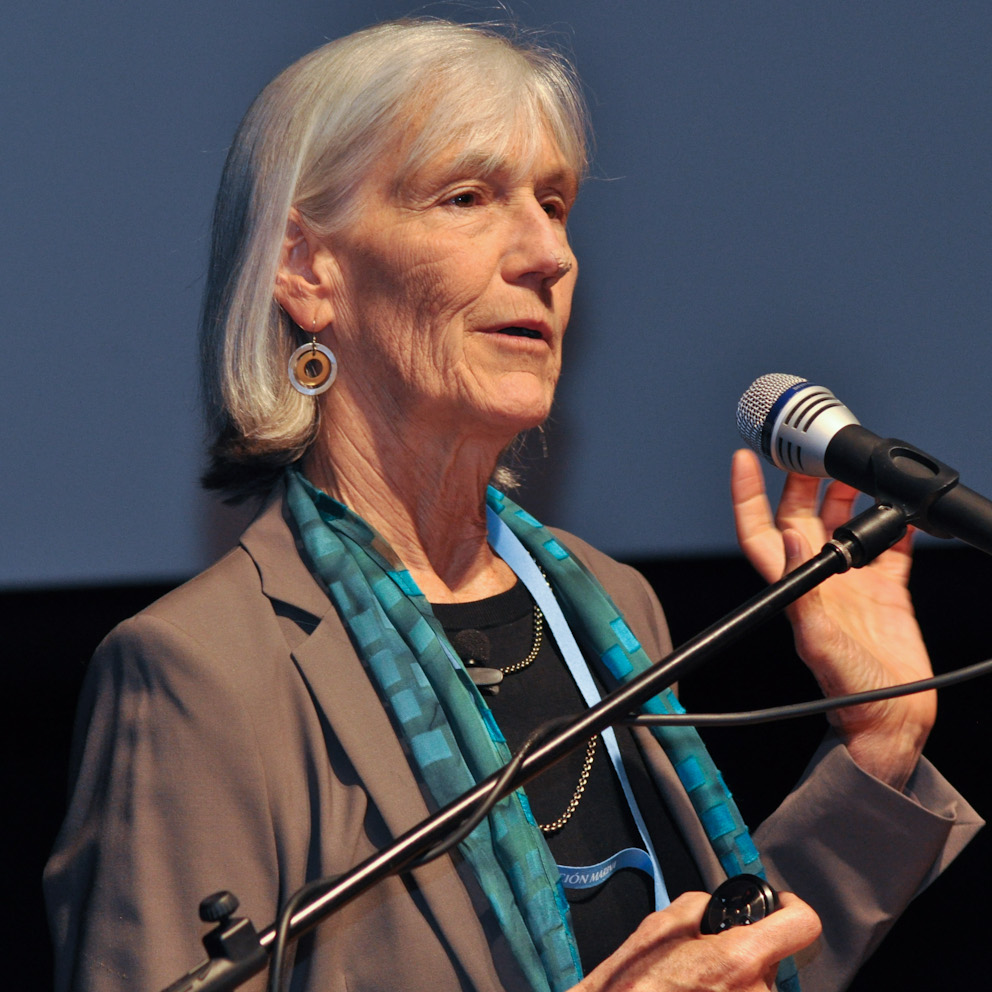
- Packard speaking about ocean conservation at a seminar in Chile in 2011
- Born: 1952 or 1953 (age 72–73)
- Education: University of California, Santa Cruz
- Occupations: Ocean conservationist; Philanthropist
- Known for: Leading Monterey Bay Aquarium; Ocean conservation strategy
- Awards: Audubon Medal; Fellow, American Academy of Arts and Sciences

Julie E. Packard (born 1952/1953) is an American ocean conservationist and philanthropist. She helped create the Monterey Bay Aquarium in the early 1980s, and was its executive director from its opening in 1984 until 2026. She speaks at conferences and symposia related to ocean conservation and writes online about current issues. She is a fellow of the American Academy of Arts and Sciences and is a recipient of the Audubon Medal.

== Early life and education ==
Packard grew up in the Santa Clara Valley in Northern California, where she rode horses and explored nature on the extensive grounds of San Felipe Ranch each weekend. With her father, David Packard, the co-founder of Hewlett-Packard, she planted a vegetable garden every year. Packard spent much time outdoors, and was always very curious; as a student at University of California, Santa Cruz, her biology professor said she "was able to synthesize and ask great questions. She had a wide-open, inquisitive mind." Her most fond experiences as a student were early mornings wearing hip waders, combing through algae and animals of the intertidal zone. She graduated with a bachelor's degree in biology in 1974, and a Master of Arts in 1978, focusing on marine algae.

== Career ==
Packard joined other members of her family in the undertaking to create Monterey Bay Aquarium. Her sister, Nancy Burnett, also has a degree in marine biology, and her father helped design the facility's infrastructure. Packard became the aquarium's executive director by the time the aquarium opened in 1984. As part of her role at Monterey Bay Aquarium, Packard was instrumental in the creation of the sustainable seafood advisory list, Seafood Watch, and its endeavor to prevent the import of seafood harvested through slavery.

Packard chairs the board of directors of the Monterey Bay Aquarium Research Institute, and is also a trustee of the David and Lucile Packard Foundation. She received the Audubon Medal from the National Audubon Society in 1998 for her work in conservation and environmental protection, became a member of the American Philosophical Society in 2004, and was elected as a fellow to the American Academy of Arts and Sciences in 2009. Packard received a lifetime achievement award from the National Marine Sanctuary Foundation, the Ted Danson Ocean Hero Award from Oceana in 2004, and was named a California Coastal Hero in 2009 by the California Coastal Commission and Sunset magazine.

Packard has spoken at various symposia, including the International Aquarium Congress, Our Ocean Conference, the Seafood Summit, the Global Climate Action Summit, and the United Nations Ocean Conference. She writes online about the ocean in the context of climate change, sustainable seafood, and the deep sea. Among other publications, Packard has written opinion pieces for The New York Times and The Boston Globe (with John Kerry). She was a member of The Pew Charitable Trusts' Oceans Commission, and is a member of the leadership council for the resulting Joint Ocean Commission Initiative, which formed in 2005.

Packard was granted an honorary Doctor of Science degree by California State University, Monterey Bay in "recognition of her many accomplishments as an ocean conservationist". A species of coral, Gersemia juliepackardae, is named in her honor for "her dedication to ocean stewardship and conservation, and for elevating public awareness about the ocean environment." A portrait of Packard, painted by Hope Gangloff, was displayed at the National Portrait Gallery in Washington, D.C. between 2019 and 2020. In the painting, Packard is standing in front of the colorful kelp forest exhibit at Monterey Bay Aquarium. She is the second female ocean conservationist to be included in the museum's collection, and it is the museum's 17th commissioned portrait.

== Philanthropy ==
In 2014, Packard donated US$1 million to University of California, Santa Cruz to establish the "Dean's Fund for Diversity in the Sciences", which funds programs to support underrepresented minority students in science and math. She has also given money to California State University, Monterey Bay's Division of Science and Environmental Policy.
