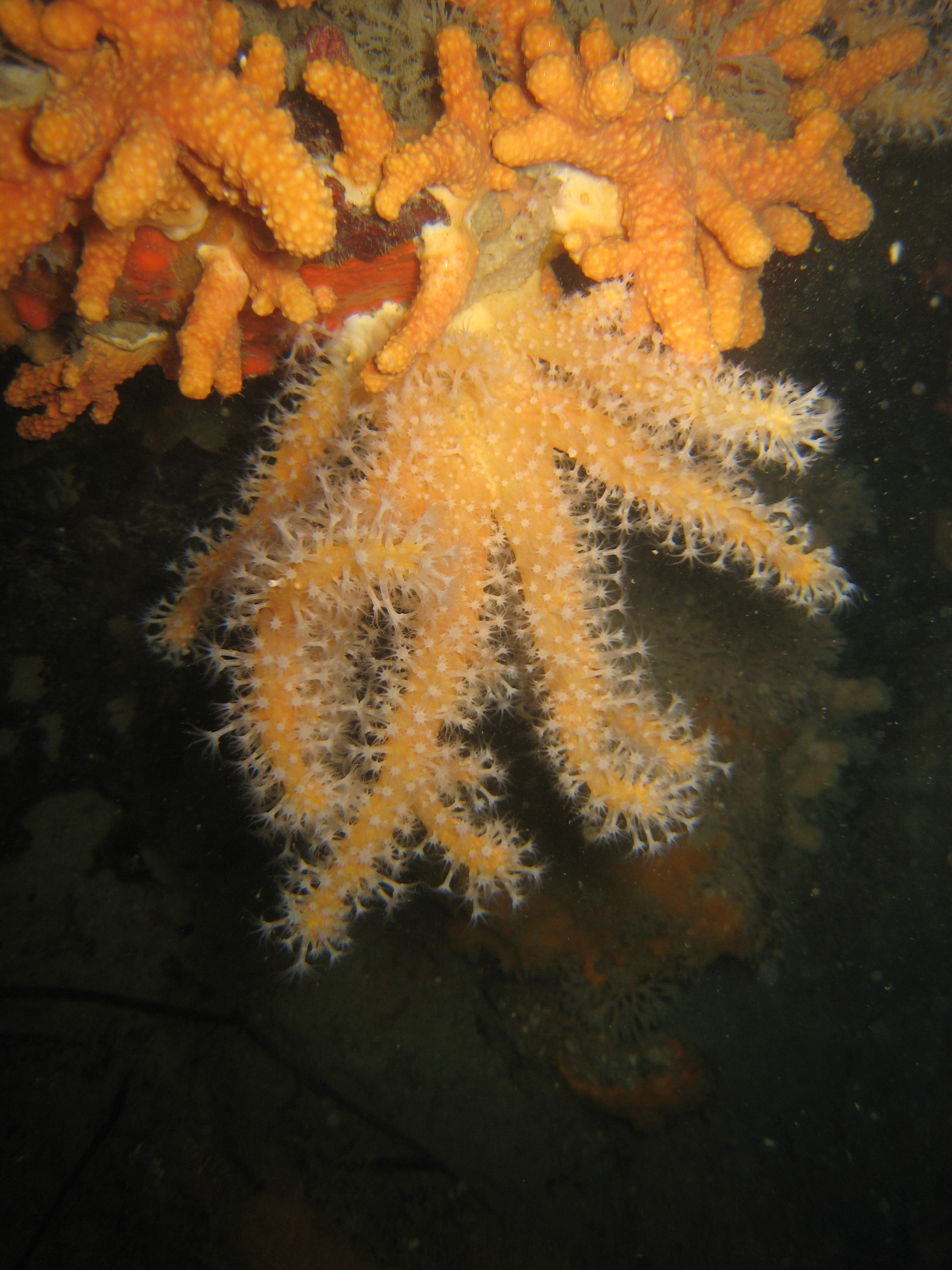
- Alcyonium glomeratum

Scientific classification
- Kingdom: Animalia
- Phylum: Cnidaria
- Subphylum: Anthozoa
- Class: Octocorallia
- Order: Malacalcyonacea
- Family: Alcyoniidae
- Genus: Alcyonium
- Species: A. glomeratum

Binomial name
- Alcyonium glomeratum Hassall, 1843

= Alcyonium glomeratum =

Species of coral

Alcyonium glomeratum or red sea fingers is a species of soft coral in the family Alcyoniidae. It is found around the southern and western coasts of Britain and Ireland.

== Description ==
Red sea fingers is similar in shape to Alcyonium digitatum but is usually blood red or rust coloured. The finger-shaped lobes are slender and can be up to thirty centimetres long. The polyps are white and each one has eight pinnate tentacles which give the colony a feathery appearance when they are extended.

== Distribution ==
This coral is found on the west coast of Britain and Ireland, north to western Scotland and south to the Bay of Biscay. It is quite localised but may be abundant in places.

It is also found on the East Coast of United Arab Emirates (Gulf of Oman - Indian Ocean) on wreck: Inshcape-2 opposite to Khurr-Fakkan City. Below Photo was taken on Inshcape-2 Wreck by Yahia Mokhtar, December 2014 (seabed 22m) and shows the coral.

== Gallery ==
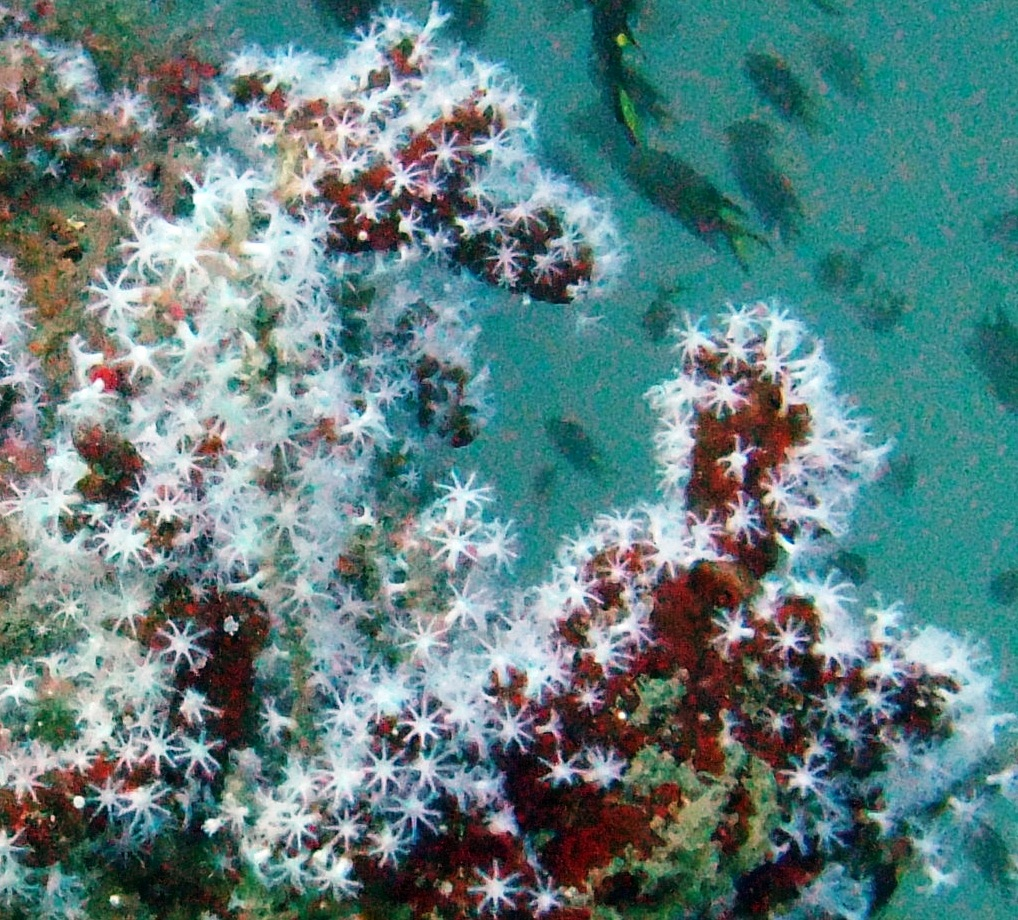
Red fingers (Alcyonium glomeratum) on Inshcape-II wreck, December 2014, Khurr-Fakkan, UAE

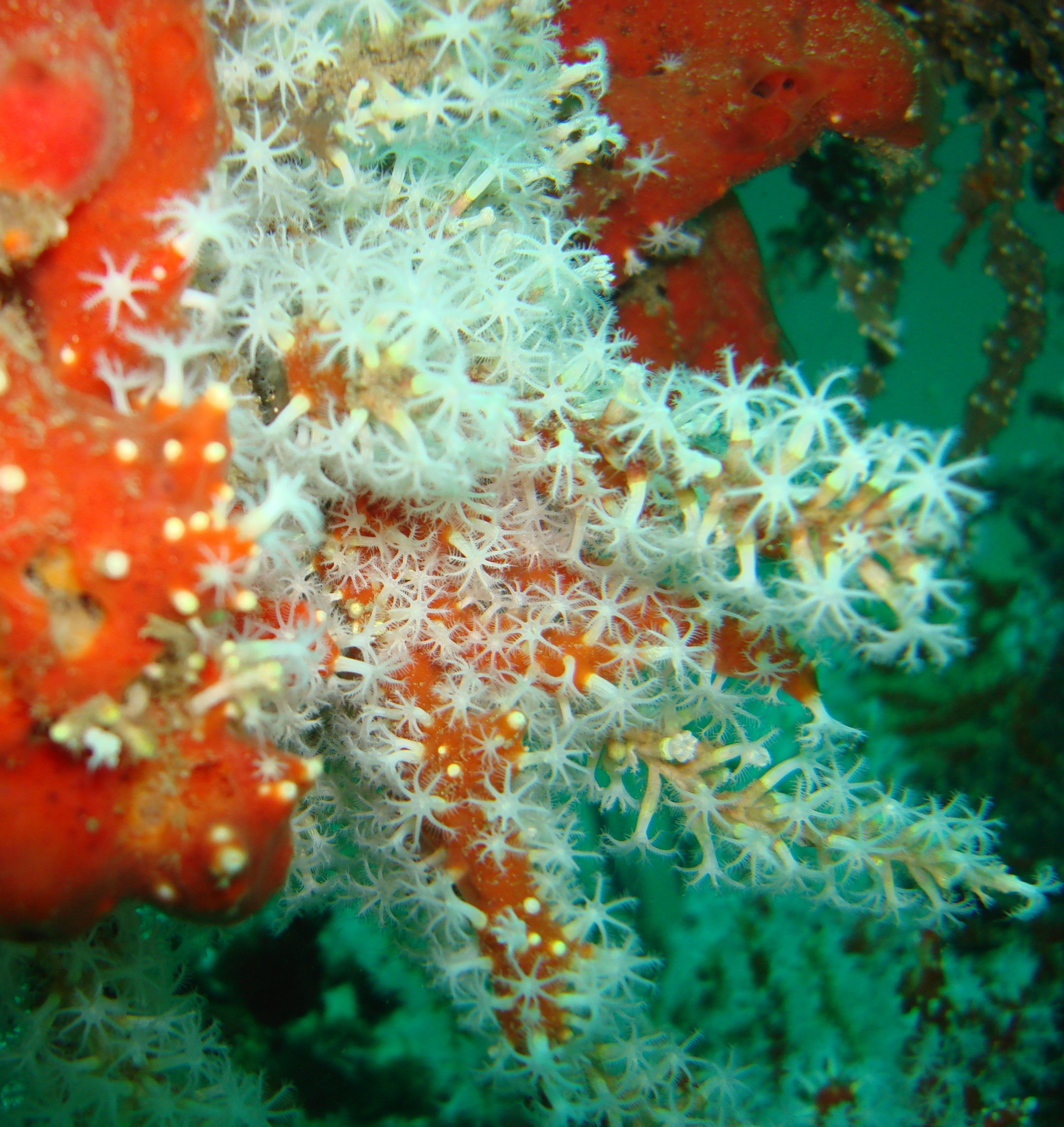
Red fingers (Alcyonium glomeratum) on Inshcape-I wreck, Khurr-Fakkan, UAE

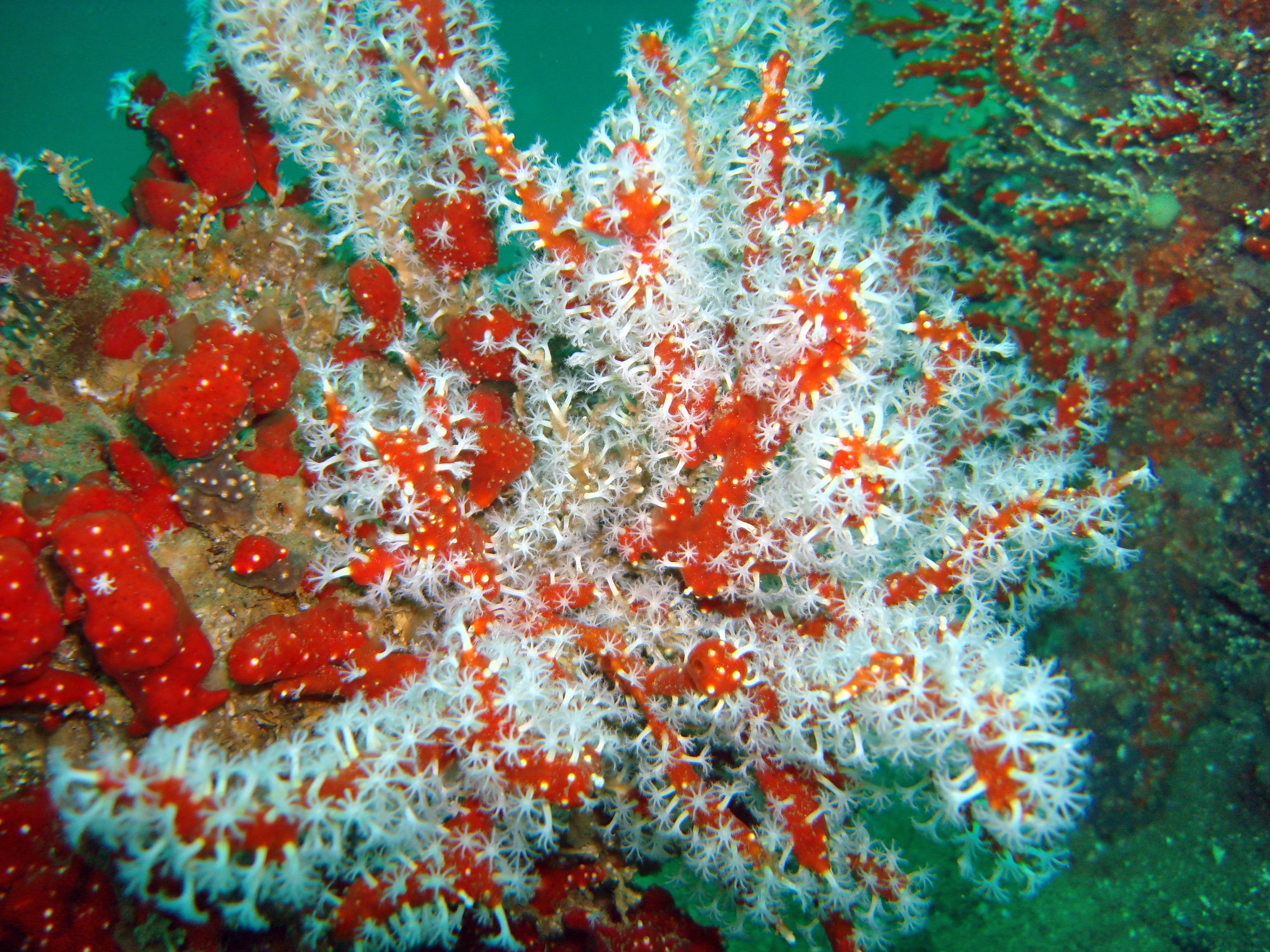
Red fingers (Alcyonium glomeratum) on Inshcape-I wreck, Khurr-Fakkan, UAE

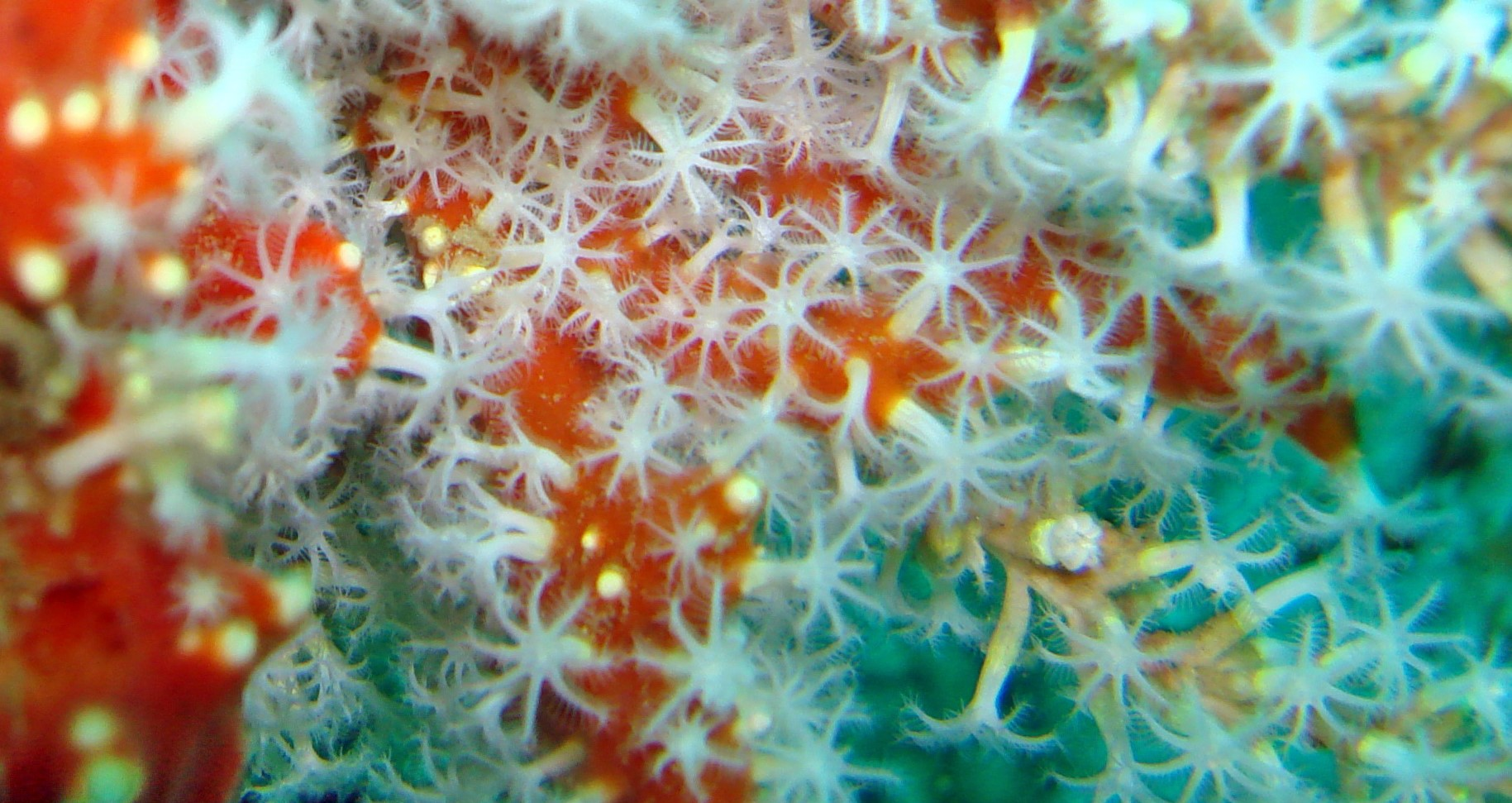
Red fingers (Alcyonium glomeratum) on Inshcape-I wreck, Khurr-Fakkan, UAE

== Habitat ==
This coral is found on bedrock in gullies, crevices and under overhangs in sheltered locations in the sublittoral zone at depths exceeding ten metres. It favours open water on the lee side of islands and rocks.
