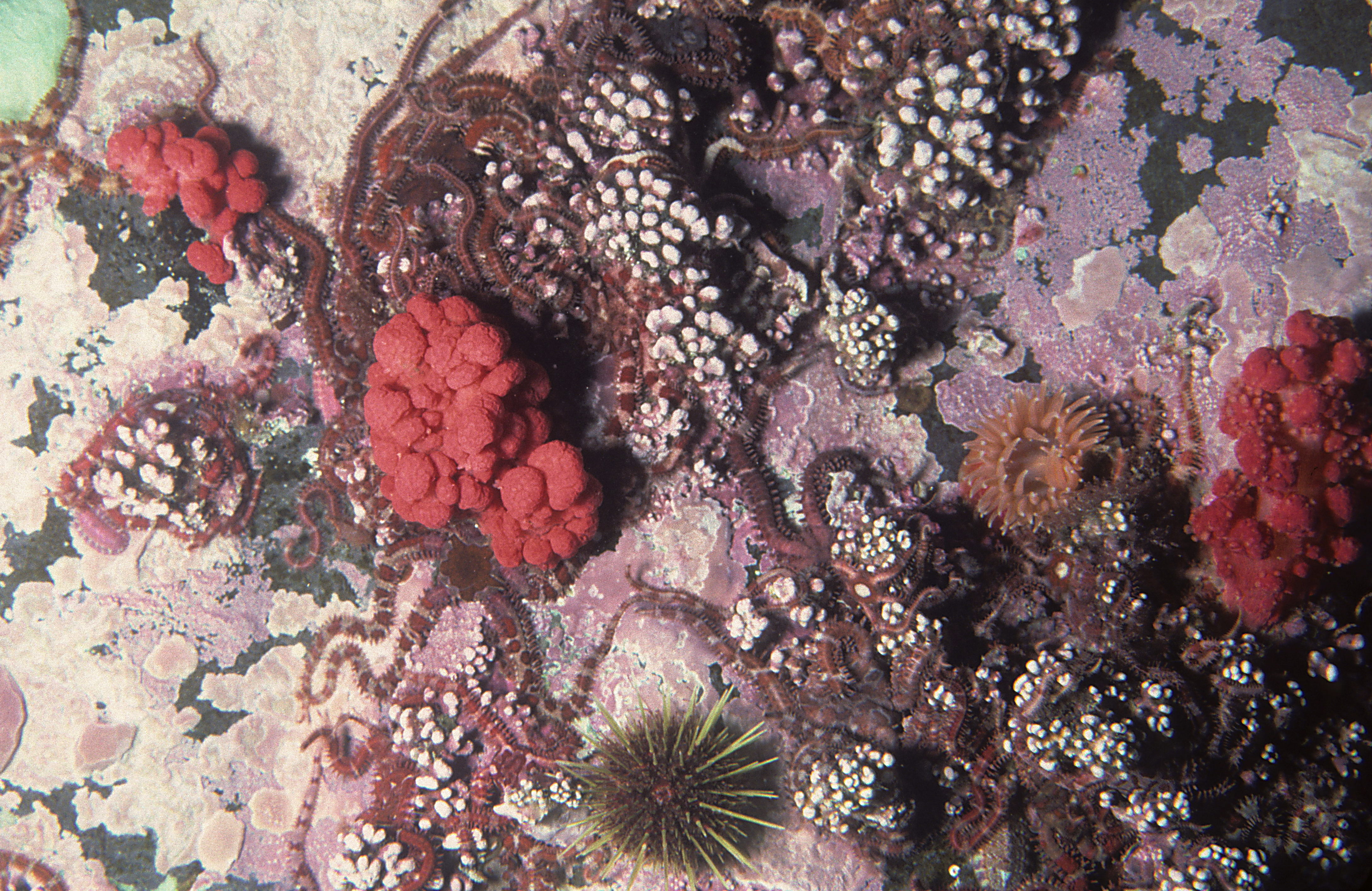

Scientific classification
- Kingdom: Animalia
- Phylum: Cnidaria
- Subphylum: Anthozoa
- Class: Octocorallia
- Order: Malacalcyonacea
- Family: Alcyoniidae
- Genus: Gersemia
- Species: G. rubiformis

Binomial name
- Gersemia rubiformis (Ehrenberg, 1834)

Synonyms
- Capnella rubiformis (Ehrenberg, 1834); Eunephthya rubiformis (Ehrenberg, 1834); Lobularia rubiformis Eherenberg, 1834

= Gersemia rubiformis =

Species of coral

Gersemia rubiformis, commonly known as the sea strawberry, is a species of soft coral in the family Alcyoniidae. It is found in the northwest Atlantic and the northeast Pacific Oceans.

== Description ==
Gersemia rubiformis is a colonial coral that grows in the form of knobbly clumps. The colonies are erect and branch from one main stalk. The polyps are concentrated near the ends of the narrower terminal branches and are non-retractile in their calyces. The branches are not rigid but are stiffened by the presence of sclerites, and can sway gently in the current. The sclerites are red, some being irregular and shaped like miniature capstans. Gersemia rubiformis does not contain the symbiotic alga zooxanthella.

== Distribution ==
Gersemia rubiformis is found in polar to temperate regions of the Arctic Ocean and the north west Atlantic Ocean from the coasts of Canada south to Cape Hatteras in North Carolina. A separate population is found in the Pacific Ocean off the coasts of British Columbia and south to California. It occurs on both sandy and muddy substrates, on rocks and on the hard parts of other benthic invertebrates such as shells.

== Ecology ==
Many other marine invertebrates share the habitat of Gersemia rubiformis. Juvenile basket stars (Gorgonocephalus eucnemis) are often found clinging to the coral and hiding in the interstices. The white sea anemone Metridium senile often grows nearby and the rock scallop (Crassadoma gigantea) shares the same habitat in California.

In Puget Sound, juvenile basket stars (Gorgonocephalus eucnemis) have been found to be living, growing and feeding inside the pharynges of Gersemia rubiformis polyps, only becoming free-living when they have grown large enough to catch food for themselves.

== Research ==
Researchers in British Columbia found that extracts of Gersemia rubiformis showed antimicrobial activity when tested in vitro. They identified three novel diterpenoids which they named gersemolide, rubifolide and epilophodione.
