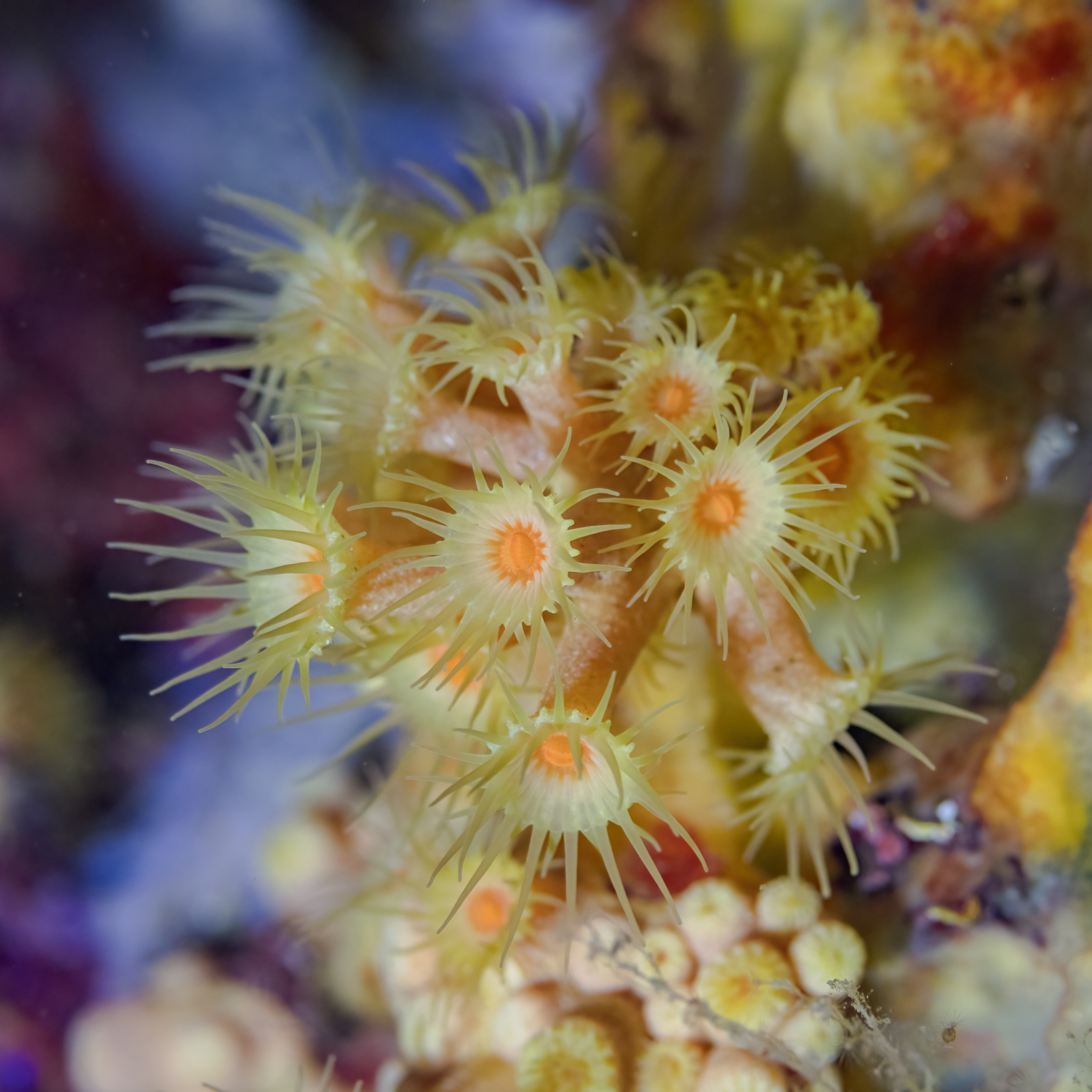

Conservation status
- Least Concern (IUCN 3.1) (Mediterranean)

Scientific classification
- Kingdom: Animalia
- Phylum: Cnidaria
- Subphylum: Anthozoa
- Class: Hexacorallia
- Order: Zoantharia
- Family: Parazoanthidae
- Genus: Parazoanthus
- Species: P. axinellae

Binomial name
- Parazoanthus axinellae (Schmidt, 1862)

Synonyms
- Palythoa axinellae Schmidt, 1862·; Parazoanthus dixoni Haddon & Shackleton, 1891

= Parazoanthus axinellae =

Species of sea anemone

Parazoanthus axinellae, commonly known as the yellow cluster anemone, is a zoanthid coral found on the southern Atlantic coasts of Europe and in the Mediterranean Sea. Zoanthids differ from true sea anemones, in having a different internal anatomy and in forming true colonies in which the individual animals (polyps) are connected by a common tissue, named coenenchyme.

== Description ==
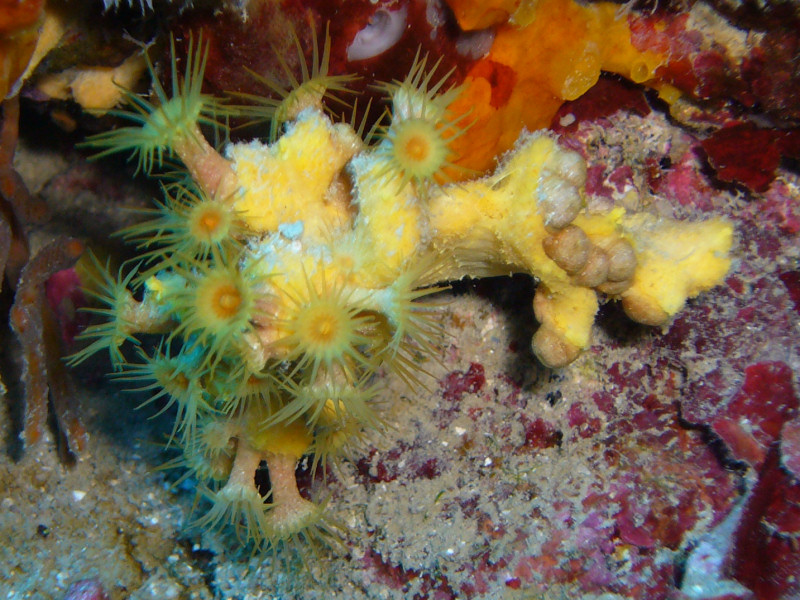
A colony of individual zooids connected by coenenchyme

The species is yellow or orange in colour and each polyp has twenty-four to thirty-six tentacles disposed in two whorls. The polyps are 5 millimetres (0.20 in) in diameter and 20 millimetres (0.79 in) in height. They are connected together in small colonies by a continuous layer of tissue, the coenenchyme. In this species there are sometimes thick yellow spongy masses of tissue at the base of each zooid. A similar zooanthid is Parazoanthus anguicomus, but that species has more numerous tentacles.

== Distribution and habitat ==
Parazoanthus axinellae is found in the temperate eastern Atlantic Ocean and the Mediterranean Sea. It occurs at depths between 23 and 45 metres (75 and 148 ft) on rocky substrates.

== Ecology ==
In the Mediterranean Sea, Parazoanthus axinellae frequently forms dense agglomerations, often in association with the soft coral Alcyonium acaule. Other organisms in these biodiverse habitats include suspension feeders such as sponges, cnidarians, bryozoans and tunicates, and the rock is encrusted with coralline algae.

The colonies of Parazoanthus axinellae sometimes divide to form two closely positioned but separate colonies, and colonies growing in close proximity occasionally coalesce.
