= Aldersladum =

Scientific classification
- Kingdom: Animalia
- Phylum: Cnidaria
- Subphylum: Anthozoa
- Class: Octocorallia
- Order: Malacalcyonacea
- Family: Cladiellidae
- Genus: Aldersladum; Benayahu & McFadden, 2011

Genus of corals

Aldersladum is a genus of the Cladiellidae family. Aldersladum are Octocorallia found from the Philippine Sea to the Indian Ocean. The genus was created from previously described corals with similar properties in 2011.

== Species ==
- Aldersladum jengi Benayahu & McFadden, 2011
- Aldersladum nana Hickson, 1931
- Aldersladum sodwanum Benayahu, 1993
