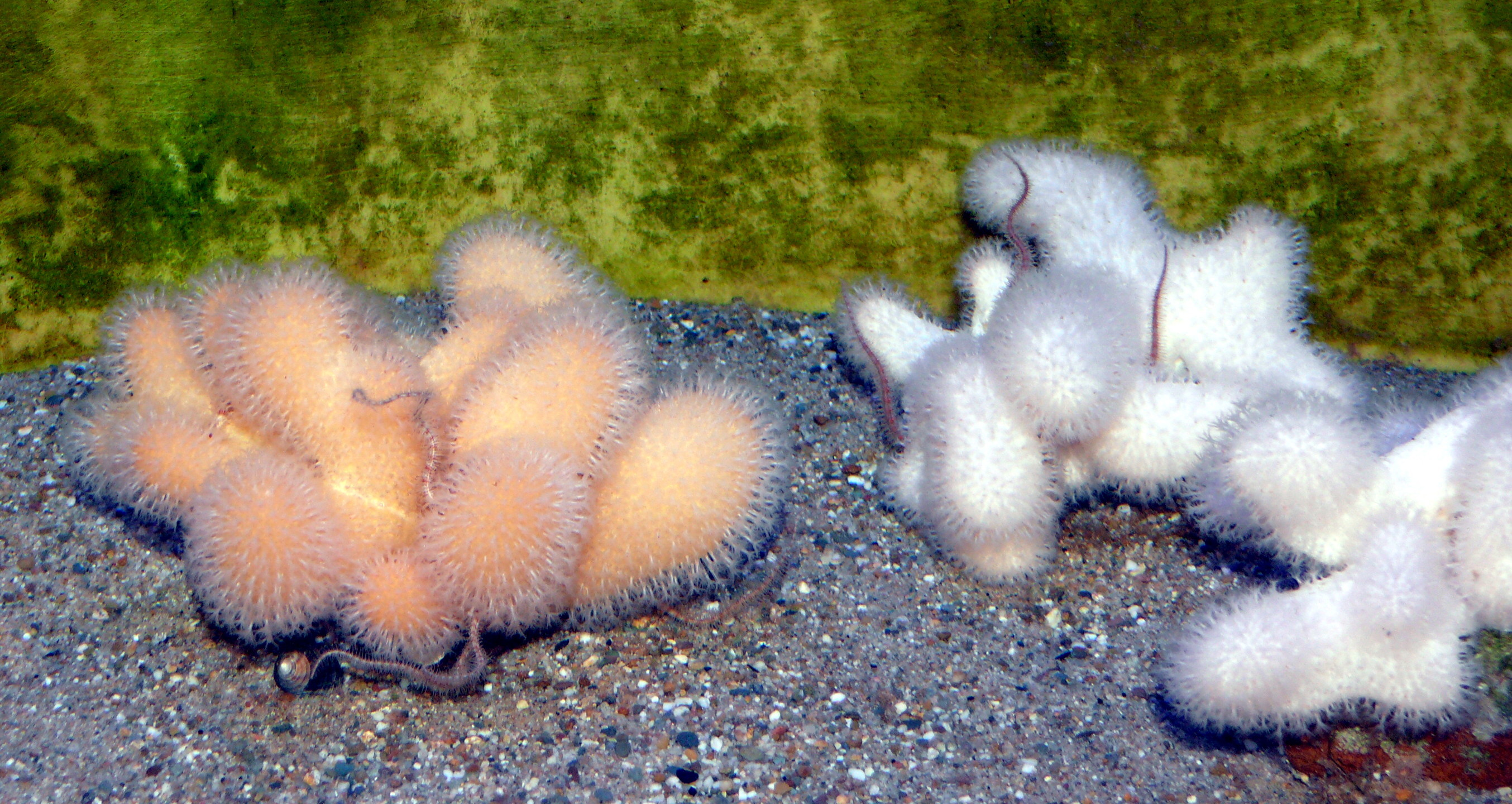
- Alcyonium digitatum

Conservation status
- Secure (NatureServe)

Scientific classification
- Kingdom: Animalia
- Phylum: Cnidaria
- Subphylum: Anthozoa
- Class: Octocorallia
- Order: Malacalcyonacea
- Family: Alcyoniidae
- Genus: Alcyonium
- Species: A. digitatum

Binomial name
- Alcyonium digitatum Linnaeus, 1758

= Alcyonium digitatum =

Species of soft coral also known as dead man's fingers

Alcyonium digitatum or dead man's fingers is a species of soft coral in the family Alcyoniidae. It is found around the coasts of the northern Atlantic Ocean and other temperate waters such as the South Pacific.

== Description ==
Dead man's fingers is a colonial coral forming clumps of yellow, white or cream-coloured fleshy masses of finger-like lobes. The surface layer include many sclerites which form a crust. The individual polyps are white and translucent, and project from the leathery surface when feeding, giving the colony a furry appearance.

== Distribution and habitat ==
Dead man's fingers is found along the Atlantic coasts of north west Europe from Portugal to Norway, most recently being discovered in the uncharted waters of Jammerbugt bay off the north-west coast of Denmark by a 2020 seafloor mapping project led by explorer Klaus Thymann. The species also occurs in parts of Canada, northeastern coast of the United States, the Gulf of Maine and the Bay of Fundy and the northern waters of New Zealand. The polyps live in colonies attached to bedrock, boulders, stones and occasionally the shells of crabs and gastropods. They are most plentiful in areas with strong water movement and where there is insufficient sunlight for algae to predominate. They are usually found in the sublittoral zone down to about fifty metres. This coral is common around the coasts of Britain and Ireland where Alcyonium glomeratum and Alcyonium hibernicum are also found but these are much rarer and misidentification is unlikely.

== Biology ==
The colonies of dead man's fingers are nearly always either male or female, although a small number of hermaphrodite colonies are found. Colony growth occurs mainly in the first half of the year with the polyps becoming inactive in late summer, and the base tissue turning reddish or brownish due to the growth of algae and hydroids on the surface. At this time the gonads are developing and spawning occurs in December and January. Populations have been found to synchronize their gametogenesis and spawning activities. Fertilisation takes place externally and the embryos float for a few days before developing into free swimming larvae. Most of these soon settle on a suitable substrate and new polyps develop but a few may remain in the zooplankton for some time and disperse over a wide area. Colonies have been known to live for twenty years.

The polyps feed at various times of the day with their tentacles extended. They are suspension feeders gathering plankton from the water with the help of cilia, and absorbing oxygen at the same time.
