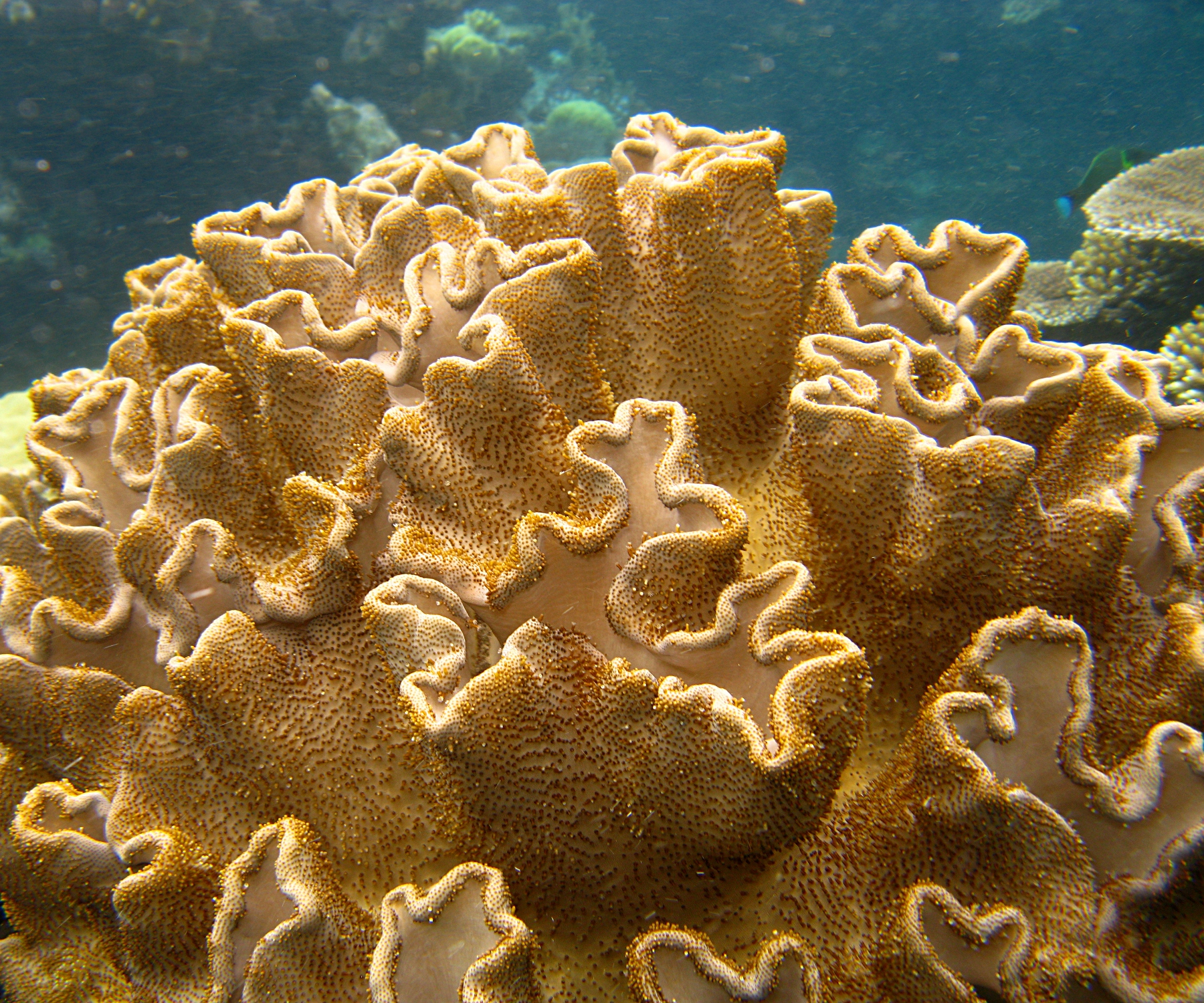
- Sarcophyton sp. on the Great Barrier Reef

Scientific classification
- Kingdom: Animalia
- Phylum: Cnidaria
- Subphylum: Anthozoa
- Class: Octocorallia
- Order: Malacalcyonacea
- Family: Alcyoniidae; Lamouroux, 1812

Genera
- See text

Synonyms
- Anthothelidae; Bellonelladae; Lobulariadae

= Alcyoniidae =

Family of corals

Alcyoniidae is a family of leathery or soft corals in the phylum Cnidaria.

== Description ==
A colony of leathery coral is stiff, hard and inflexible. It is composed of tiny polyps projecting from a shared leathery tissue. Members of the family may have two kinds of polyps; the autozooids have long trunks and eight tiny branched tentacles and project from the shared leathery tissue while the siphonozooids remain below the surface and pump water for the colony. They appear as tiny hollows or mounds among the taller autozooids. Different genera have different proportions of these two kinds of polyps. The autozooids only emerge when the colony is fully submerged.

== Distribution and habitat ==
Leathery corals occur globally in temperate and tropical seas. They are often pioneer reef species and are found in wave-exposed areas of reef crests, less turbid waters in lagoons, on steep slopes, under overhangs and at depths of thirty metres or even deeper.

== Biology ==
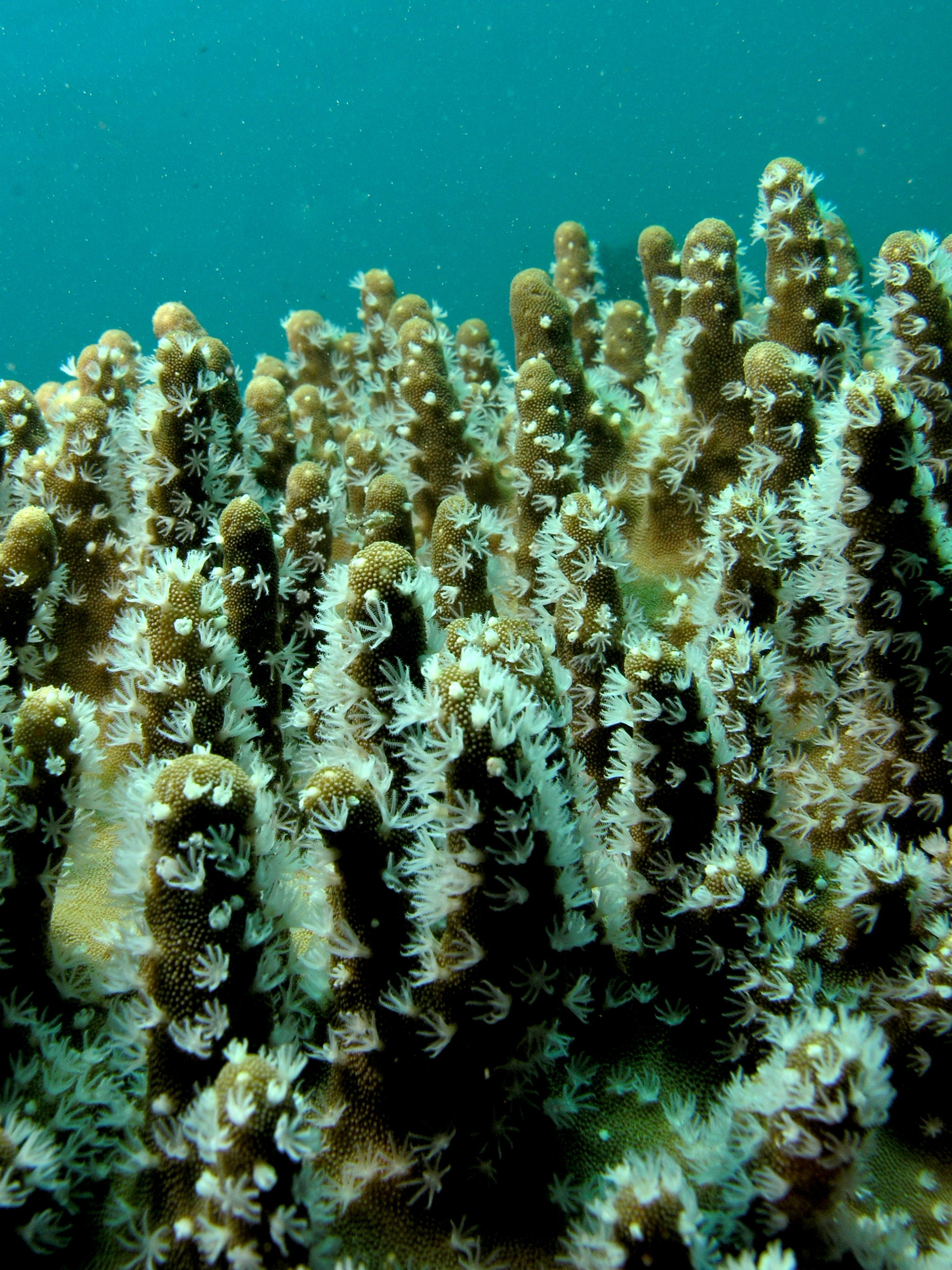
Lobophyton sp. with extended polyps

Leathery coral polyps include endosymbiotic algae called zooxanthellae. The algae undergo photosynthesis and produce sugars from sunlight. This food is shared with the host, which itself provides the algae with minerals and shelter. Periodically, the surface layer of the leathery tissue is shed. This seems to be a mechanism for ridding the colony of unwanted algal growth.

In a study on the Great Barrier Reef, it was found that the population of these corals was very stable. There was little predation, low rates of growth, reproduction and mortality, few new colonies came into existence and few disappeared over a three-year period.

== Genera ==
The following genera are recognized in the family Alcyoniidae:

- Alcyonium Linnaeus, 1758
- Anthothela Verrill, 1879
- Bellonella Gray, 1862
- Eleutherobia Puetter, 1900
- Gersemia von Marenzeller, 1878
- Hedera Conti-Jerpe & Freshwater, 2017
- Kotatea Kessel, Alderslade, Bilewitch, Schnabel, Norman, Tekaharoa Potts & Gardner, 2022
- Lateothela Moore, Alderslade & Miller, 2017
- Ushanaia Kessel, Alderslade, Bilewitch, Schnabel, Norman, Tekaharoa Potts & Gardner, 2022

== See also ==
- Alcyonium digitatum
- Alcyonium glomeratum
