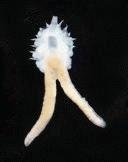

Scientific classification
- Kingdom: Animalia
- Phylum: Annelida
- Clade: Pleistoannelida
- Order: Myzostomida
- Family: Myzostomatidae
- Genus: Myzostoma
- Species: M. divisor

Binomial name
- Myzostoma divisor Grygier, 1989

= Myzostoma divisor =

Species of marine polychaete

Myzostoma divisor is a species of parasitic marine polychaete in the order Myzostomida.

== Ecology ==
M. divisor is a free-living, ectocommensal parasite of various comatulid feather stars, including Promachocrinus kerguelensis and Notocrinus mortenseni, and shows little host specificity. It is found in Antarctic waters, ranging from the Ross Sea to South Georgia, having been found 49–567 metres (161–1,860 ft) deep.

== Description ==
The body is yellowish-brown, with a diameter of about 2 millimetres (0.079 in). It is disk-shaped, surrounded by nine pairs of marginal cirri of equal sizes, and an unarmed proboscis at the oral end. The underside bears five evenly-spaced pairs of parapodia around two-thirds of the way to the outside of the disk, with long and slender parapodial hooks. A pair of caudal processes is present at the posterior end on each side of the cloacal opening, reaching up to 1.75 times the length of the body, and themselves ending in a pair of terminal cirri. The caudal processes are often of unequal lengths, and are either cylindrical or flattened dorsoventrally.

=== Life cycle ===
In its earliest stage, the body, oval and around 200 μm long, (Note: Body length measurements exclude the proboscis) shows well-developed parapodia and a proboscis one-fourth the length of the body, but no indications of marginal cirri or caudal processes. The next stage, described from a specimen 310 μm in length, shows blunt rudiments of marginal cirri, with the last, thicker pair destined to become the caudal processes. In later stages, the body becomes round, with the marginal cirri and parapodia elongating. The caudal processes thicken before elongating past the length of the marginal cirri, while the proboscis gains the ability to retract, giving the myzostomid its adult appearance.

== Etymology ==
The specific epithet divisor comes from the similarity of the body's prominent caudal processes to a pair of dividers.

== Taxonomy ==
Myzostoma divisor is part of the species-rich genus Myzostoma, along with more than 150 other species, all parasites of various crinoids. Its closest relative is M. josefinae, from which it is distinguished by having marginal cirri of equal lengths. Beyond this, they are related to M. filicauda (Note: As described by Graf in 1883, distinct from the 1884 description under the same name of a species possessing 20 marginal cirri) and M. tentaculatum, also characterized by elongated caudal appendages. While M. bicaudatum and M. filiferum also possess similar appendages, the presence of 20 marginal cirri instead of 18 in these species, and the lack of terminal cirri on the caudal processes of M. bicaudatum, make them less likely relatives.
