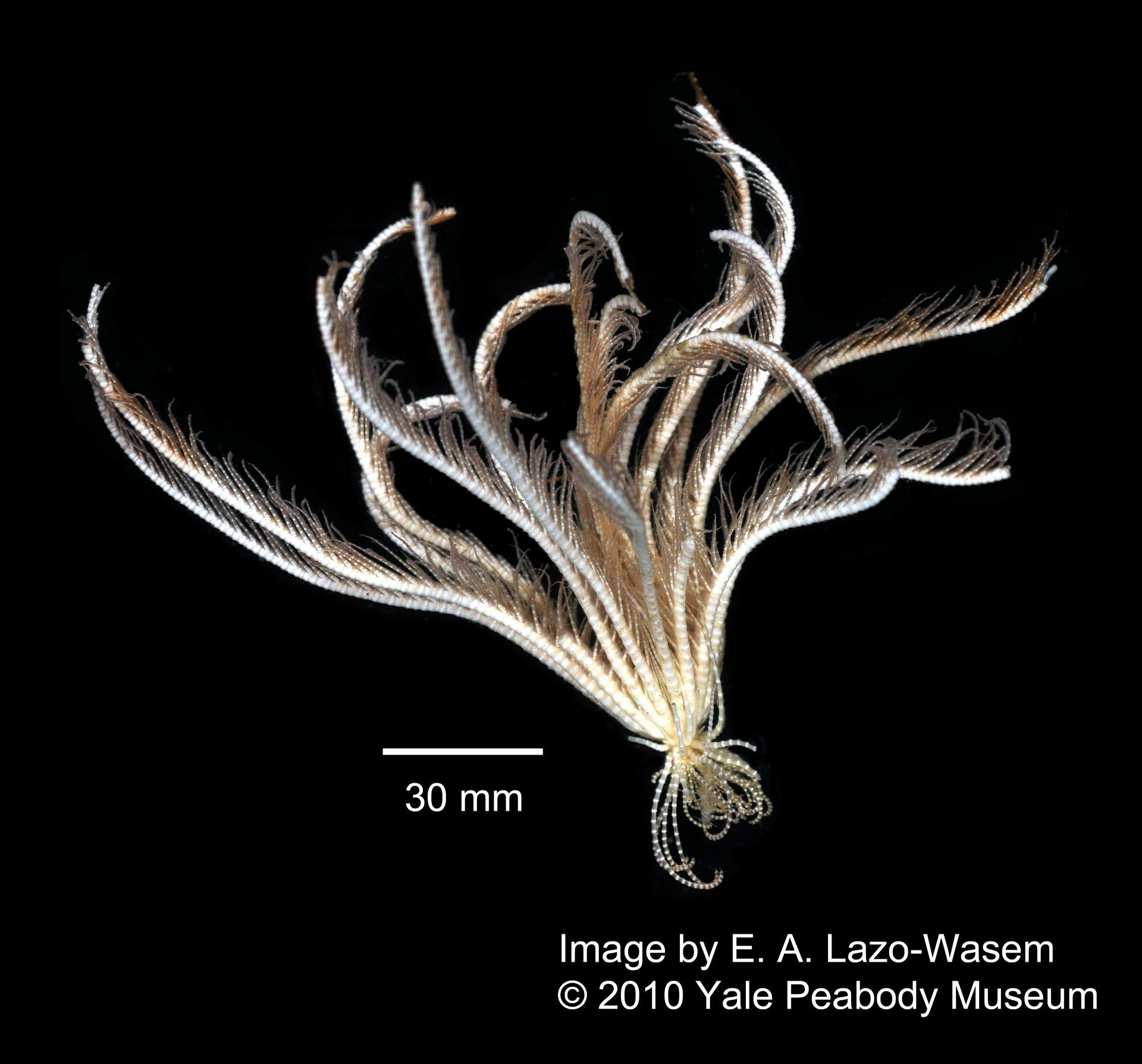

Scientific classification
- Kingdom: Animalia
- Phylum: Echinodermata
- Class: Crinoidea
- Superorder: Articulata
- Order: Comatulida
- Family: Antedonidae
- Genus: Promachocrinus
- Species: P. kerguelensis

Binomial name
- Promachocrinus kerguelensis Carpenter, 1879

Synonyms
- Promachocrinus joubini Vaney, 1910; Promachocrinus vanhoffenianus Minckert, 1905

= Promachocrinus kerguelensis =

Species of crinoids

Promachocrinus kerguelensis is a species of free-swimming, stemless crinoids. It was the only member of its genus until several species were discovered in 2023. P. keruguelensis a coldwater crinoid which is found in the seas around Antarctica and surrounding island groups, including under the sea ice.

== Description ==
This crinoid is one of two living genera that has ten radial ossicles, each giving rise to a pair of arms; there is a single canal in each radial ossicle and no basal rays. At the base are a number of clawed structures known as cirri.

== Distribution and habitat ==
P. kerguelensis is endemic to the waters of Antarctica. Its range includes the Graham Land peninsula, the South Shetland Islands, South Georgia and the South Sandwich Islands, Bouvet Island, Heard Islands and the Kerguelen Islands. The type locality is at the Kerguelen Islands, and it is from here that it gets its specific name. It occurs at depths between about 20 and 1,080 m (100 and 3,500 ft). This is a common and abundant species in the waters around Antarctica, but molecular studies have suggested that it may not be a single species. As many as five or six different "phylogroups" have been identified, each having a circumpolar distribution, being sympatric (living alongside each other) and being adapted to a wide range of depths. The large depth range of this species may be because its non-feeding larvae have a yolk which makes them buoyant, giving them a wide dispersal potential but a limited ability to select where to settle.

== Ecology ==
These crinoids inhabit either rocky areas or soft sediments and can move about using their cirri to grip the substrate, or swim by flapping their arms. They are suspension feeders, choosing locations with strong currents and extending their arms, catching plankton and suspended particles floating past with the tube feet on the pinnules. The tube feet are covered with sticky mucus that traps the food particles, which are then rolled into balls and moved along the ambulacral groove in the arms by cilia which propel them to the mouth.

They are parasitized by the myzostomid polychaete Myzostoma divisor.
