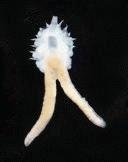
- Closely related species Myzostoma divisor

Scientific classification
- Domain: Eukaryota
- Kingdom: Animalia
- Phylum: Annelida
- Class: Polychaeta
- Order: Myzostomida
- Family: Myzostomatidae
- Genus: Myzostoma
- Species: M. josefinae

Binomial name
- Myzostoma josefinae Summers & Rouse, 2014

= Myzostoma josefinae =

Species of marine polychaete

Myzostoma josefinae is a species of parasitic marine polychaete in the order Myzostomida.

== Ecology ==
M. josefinae is an ectocommensal parasite of the zenometrid feather star Psathyrometra fragilis. It has been found in the eastern Pacific Ocean, from Monterey Canyon to Guaymas Basin, at 1,020–1,314 metres (3,346–4,311 ft) deep.

== Description ==
The species is very similar to its relative Myzostoma divisor, having a disk-shaped body around 2 millimetres (0.079 in) long bearing five pairs of parapodia two-thirds of the way to the edge of the disk, as well as a smooth anterior-facing proboscis. It also possesses two elongated caudal appendages around the cloaca, which in M. josefinae are around the size of the body disk. The species also bears nine pairs of marginal cirri around the body disk, alternating in length, with the exception of the anteriormost pair reaches twice the length of the others.

== Etymology ==
The specific epithet josefinae honors polychaete enthusiast Josefin Stiller.

== Taxonomy ==
Myzostoma josefinae is part of the species-rich genus Myzostoma, along with more than 150 other species, all parasites of various crinoids. Its closest relative is M. divisor, from which it is distinguished by having marginal cirri of alternating unequal lengths. Beyond this, they are related to M. filicauda (Note: As described by Graf in 1883, distinct from the 1884 description under the same name of a species possessing 20 marginal cirri) and M. tentaculatum, also characterized by elongated caudal appendages. While M. bicaudatum and M. filiferum also possess similar appendages, the presence of 20 marginal cirri instead of 18 in these species, and the lack of terminal cirri on the caudal processes of M. bicaudatum, make them less likely relatives.
