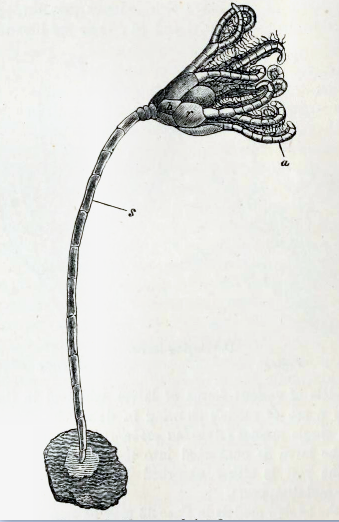
- Pentacrinoid stage of Antedon bifida; a) arms: b) basals; r) radials; s) stalk

Scientific classification
- Kingdom: Animalia
- Phylum: Echinodermata
- Class: Crinoidea
- Order: Comatulida
- Family: Antedonidae
- Genus: Antedon
- Species: A. bifida

Binomial name
- Antedon bifida (Pennant, 1777)

Synonyms
- Alecto europaea Leach, 1815; Antedon gorgonia de Freminville, 1811; Antedon maroccana AH Clark, 1910; Asterias bifida Pennant, 1777; Comatula rosacea Fleming, 1828

= Antedon bifida =

Species of crinoid

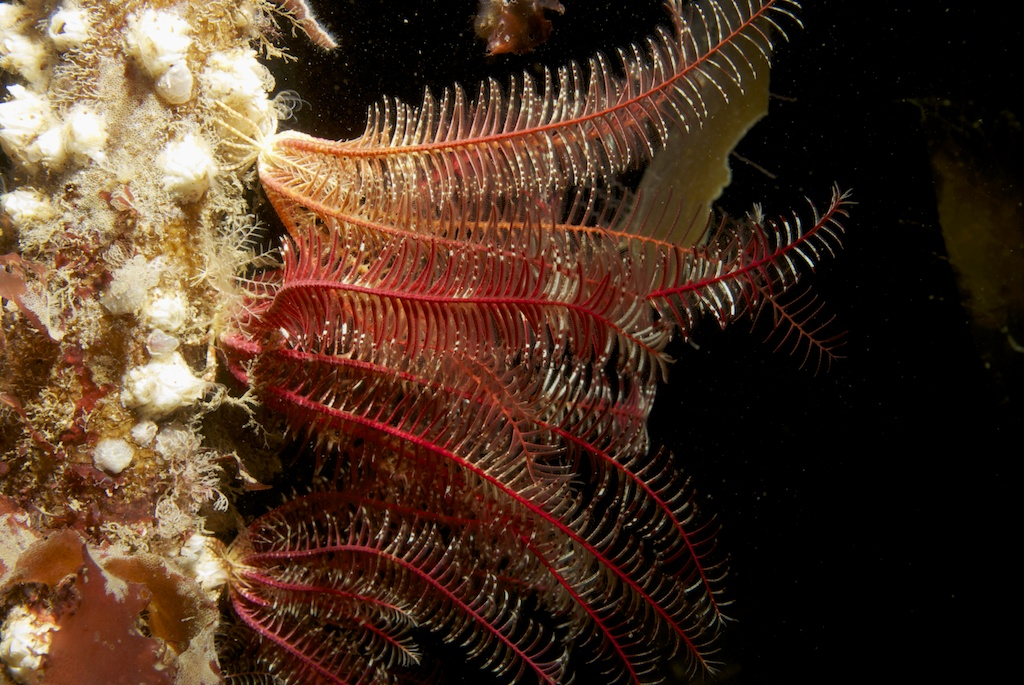
Antedon bifida, the common feather star. The Garvellachs, western Scotland, UK.

Antedon bifida is a species of crinoid in the family Antedonidae commonly known as the rosy feather star. It is found in north west Europe.

== Description ==
The body of A. bifida is a concave disc surrounded by ten pinnately divided arms giving it a fern-like appearance. The mouth and ambulacral grooves are on the upper surface of the disc. The arms can be up to 10 cm (4 in) long but are usually shorter than this. The undersides of the arms have prominent transverse ridges and some have modifications for feeding and reproduction. The pinnules are jointed, have about 35 segments and bear unequal sized tube feet in groups of three. The arm colour is variable, ranging from yellow or pink to deep purple, sometimes spotted or blotched, and the pinnules are usually paler or white. There are about twenty short cirri, banded and arranged in transverse rows on a central raised ossicle. These curl under and grasp the surface enabling the animal to crawl around which it can do with great rapidity. It may be confused with the rather similar Antedon petasus but that species is usually larger with up to 50 cirri, looks neater and does not have ridges on the undersides of its arms.

== Distribution and habitat ==
Antedon bifida is primarily found on the coasts of north west Europe, the range extending from the Shetland Islands south to Portugal. It has also been reported from Algeria, Tunisia, West Africa and Venezuela. Around the British Isles it is found on north eastern and on western coasts. It occurs from the low tide mark to a depth of about 200 m (650 ft) and occasionally much deeper. It is often associated with other crinoids and bryozoans and may dominate its habitat. It moves from place to place, clinging to rocks, seaweed and molluscs with its clawed cirri. It favours areas with strong currents in both sheltered and fairly exposed positions and is often found in gullies.

== Biology ==
Antedon bifida is a suspension feeder, catching detritus and plankton with its pinnules as they float past. Larger particles are captured and held by the two larger tube feet of each group of three. Small particles adhere to the mucus they extrude and the smaller third foot helps to bundle these together to form a bolus. The food is then transferred to the ambulacral groove where it is moved towards the mouth by the current created by the cilia that line the groove. As well as crawling around, this feather star can swim short distances by flapping its arms.

Antedon bifida is dioecious, each individual being either male or female. Gametes are produced, mostly between May and July, from the genital canals found at the base of some arms. The eggs stick to the outside of the pinnules where fertilisation takes place. The female produces a mucus net and protects the developing embryos by holding her arms together in what is described as brooding behaviour. After about five days, the eggs hatch into free-swimming larvae which soon settle on a solid surface and attach themselves with a short stalk. Now known as pentacrinoid larvae, they have a similar feeding system to that of the adults. Eventually they develop clawed cirri and become detached from their stalks, reaching maturity in one to two years.

== Ecology ==
Antedon bifida has a symbiotic relationship with the marine worm, Myzostoma cirriferum. The worm larvae are caught by the tube feet of the feather star and treated like food particles. They attach in the ambulacral grooves of the pinnules where they undergo metamorphosis and mature. They hold on with parapodial hooks and can move about on the host.
