= Heliometra glacialis =

Scientific classification
- Kingdom: Animalia
- Phylum: Echinodermata
- Class: Crinoidea
- Order: Comatulida
- Family: Antedonidae
- Genus: Heliometra
- Species: H. glacialis

Binomial name
- Heliometra glacialis (Owen, 1833 ex Leach MS)

Species of crinoid

Heliometra glacialis is a species of crinoid in the family Antedonidae. It is native across the Arctic polar range from Greenland, Iceland, northern Norway, Siberia, Japan, Massachusetts, Alaska, etc.

It is sessile and lies at depths of between 14-1900 meters.
