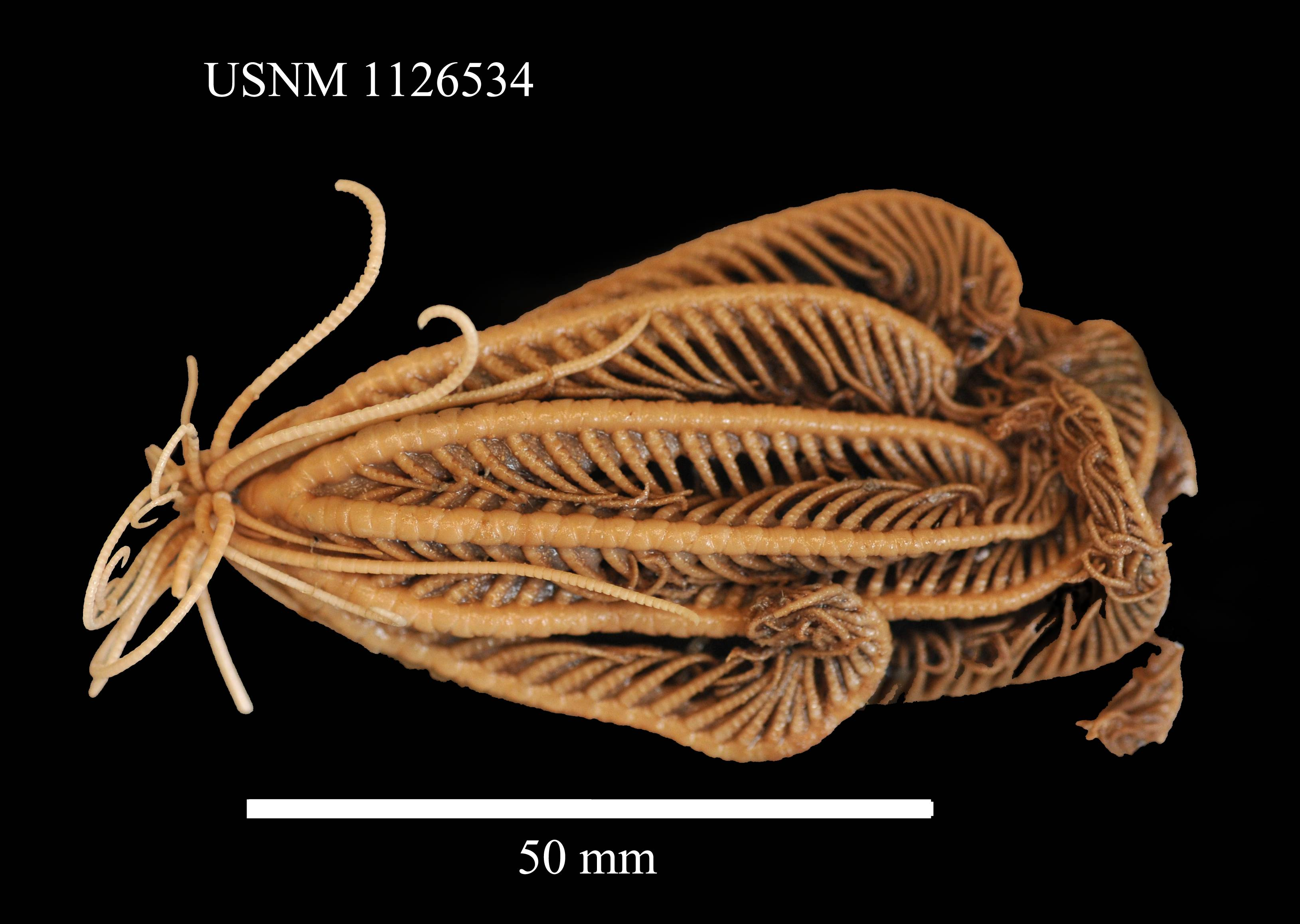

Scientific classification
- Kingdom: Animalia
- Phylum: Echinodermata
- Class: Crinoidea
- Order: Comatulida
- Family: Notocrinidae
- Genus: Notocrinus
- Species: N. virilis

Binomial name
- Notocrinus virilis Mortensen, 1917

= Notocrinus virilis =

Species of crinoid

Notocrinus virilis is a marine invertebrate, a species of crinoid or feather star in the family Notocrinidae. It is found in deep water in the Southern Ocean around the coasts of Antarctica and adjacent islands. A sea snail sometimes parasitizes it.

== Description ==
Notocrinus virilis is a robust, stalkless crinoid with ten arms (five arms, each subdivided into two) up to 200 mm (8 in) long. There are five deep radial pits on the centro-dorsal axis of the disc, forming a "radial star". There are fewer than fifty cirri at the base of the calyx. The pinnules that extend from either side of the arms are relatively short and are circular in cross section. The gonads are on the lower pinnules and there are brood pouches between these pinnules and the arms. This crinoid is dark red in colour, a colour that is already becoming apparent in the late stage, stalked larvae.

== Distribution and habitat ==
Endemic to the Southern Ocean waters around Antarctica, N. virilis probably has a circumpolar distribution. It is known from the Antarctic Peninsula, the South Orkney Islands, the Enderby Land, the Adélie Land, the Balleny Islands and the Ross Sea. Its depth range is between 80 and 1,120 m (260 and 3,670 ft).

== Ecology ==
This species can crawl around using its cirri and can also use them to climb to an elevated position in which to feed. Like all crinoids, it is a filter feeder, spreading its arms and pinnules widely to catch plankton and small particles of detritus from the water flowing past. The sexes are separate, and females brood their young in their brood pouches; the larvae may reach 1.8 mm (0.07 in) in length before being expelled from the pouch and falling to the sea bed, to which they will anchor themselves.

In early deep sea research, organisms were dredged up from the sea bed but during the trawl, any link between one species and another was often lost. More recently, it has been discovered that N. virilis often has a gastropod mollusc, Bathycrinicola tumidula, attached to it, the first time a snail from this family has been associated with a crinoid. Research in 2007 by Schiaparelli showed that B. tumidula is parasitic on N. virilis, and no other Antarctic crinoids have been found to act as hosts to the mollusc. Some of the parasitic snails were found to have inserted their proboscises between ossicles near the base of the crown while others were attached between calcareous plates on the arms.
