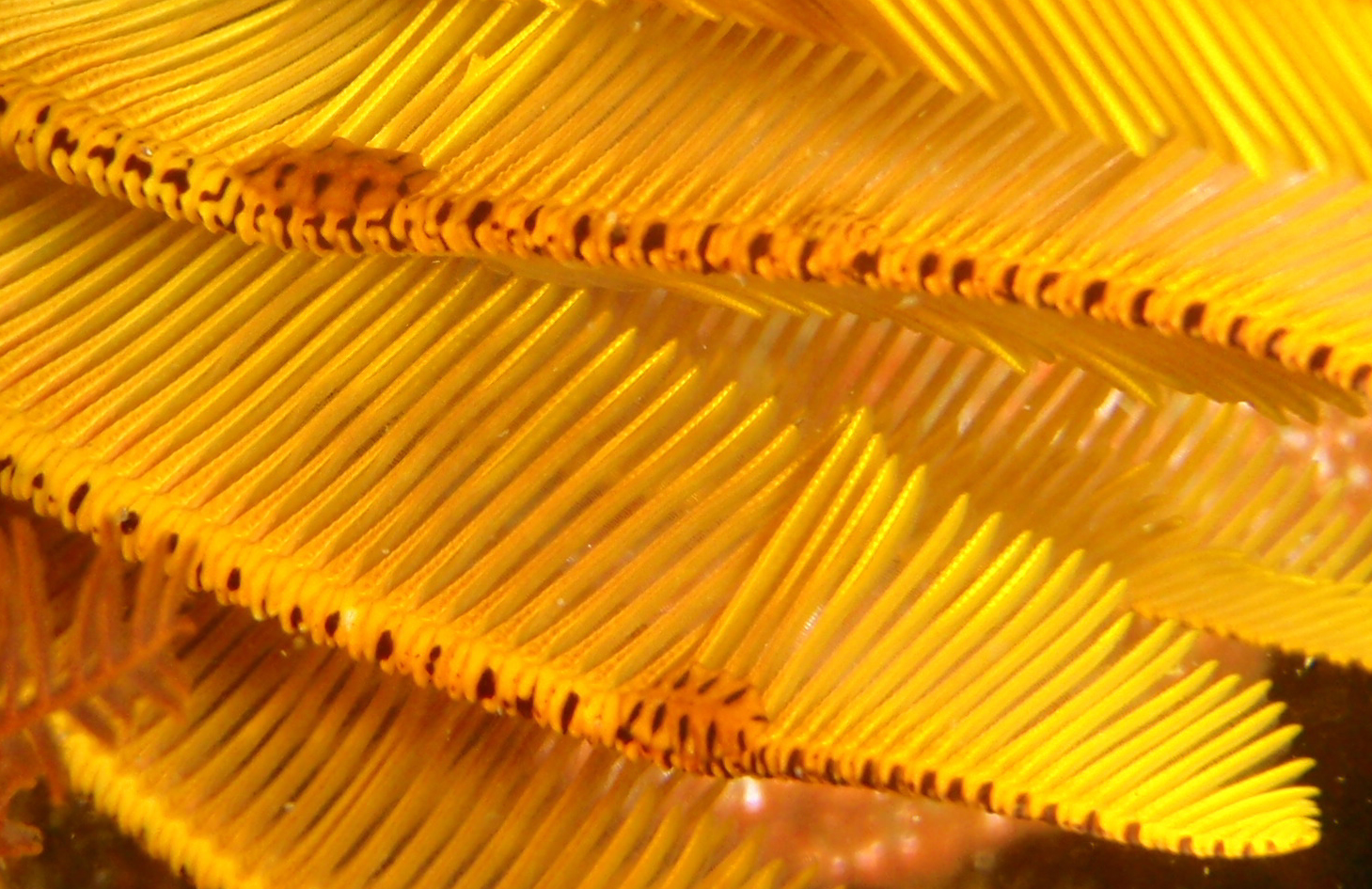
- Myzostoma fuscomaculatum on its host the crinoid Tropiometra carinata

Scientific classification
- Kingdom: Animalia
- Phylum: Annelida
- Clade: Pleistoannelida
- Order: Myzostomida
- Family: Myzostomatidae
- Genus: Myzostoma; Leuckart, 1829

Species
- See text

= Myzostoma =

Genus of annelid worms

Myzostoma is a genus of marine worms in the family Myzostomatidae. They are parasites of crinoids.

== Species ==
The following species are classified in this genus:

- Myzostoma abundans Graff, 1883
- Myzostoma adhaerens Remscheid, 1918
- Myzostoma agassizii Graff, 1883
- Myzostoma alatum Graff, 1884
- Myzostoma ambiguum Graff, 1887
- Myzostoma antarcticum Stummer-Traunfels, 1908
- Myzostoma antennatum Graff, 1884
- Myzostoma areolatum Graff, 1883
- Myzostoma armatae Grygier, 1989
- Myzostoma aruense Remscheid, 1918
- Myzostoma asymmetricum Graff, 1884
- Myzostoma atrum Atkins, 1927
- Myzostoma attenuatum Grygier, 1989
- Myzostoma australe Rouse, 2003
- Myzostoma beardi Graff, 1887
- Myzostoma belli Wheeler, 1897
- Myzostoma bicaudatum Greeff, 1883
- Myzostoma bicorne Remscheid, 1918
- Myzostoma bocki Jägersten, 1937
- Myzostoma brachiatum Graff, 1877
- Myzostoma brevicirrum Graff, 1884
- Myzostoma brevilobatum Jägersten, 1937
- Myzostoma brevipes Graff, 1883
- Myzostoma bucchichii Wagner, 1887
- Myzostoma calycotyle Graff, 1884
- Myzostoma capitocutis Eeckhaut, VandenSpiegel & Grygier, 1994
- Myzostoma caribbeanum Graff, 1883
- Myzostoma carinatum Graff, 1883
- Myzostoma carpenteri Graff, 1884
- Myzostoma cerriferoidum McClendon, 1907
- Myzostoma chelonium McClendon, 1906
- Myzostoma chelonoidium McClendon, 1906
- Myzostoma chinesicum Graff, 1884
- Myzostoma circinatum Wheeler, 1897
- Myzostoma cirricostatum Jägersten, 1937
- Myzostoma cirriferum Leuckart, 1836
- Myzostoma cirripedium Graff, 1885
- Myzostoma clarki McClendon, 1906
- Myzostoma compressum Graff, 1884
- Myzostoma coriaceum Graff, 1884
- Myzostoma cornutum Graff, 1877
- Myzostoma coronatum Graff, 1884
- Myzostoma costatum Leuckart, 1830
- Myzostoma crenatum Graff, 1883
- Myzostoma cristatum Remscheid, 1918
- Myzostoma cryptopodium Wheeler, 1897
- Myzostoma cubanum McClendon, 1907
- Myzostoma cuniculus Eeckhaut, Grygier & Deheyn, 1998
- Myzostoma cysticolum Graff, 1883
- Myzostoma deani McClendon, 1906
- Myzostoma deformator Graff, 1884
- Myzostoma dentatum Graff, 1884
- Myzostoma divisor Grygier, 1989
- Myzostoma dubium Graff, 1887
- Myzostoma echinus Graff, 1884
- Myzostoma elegans Graff, 1877
- Myzostoma elongatum Graff, 1877
- Myzostoma eremita Wheeler, 1897
- Myzostoma evermanni McClendon, 1907
- Myzostoma excisum Graff, 1883
- Myzostoma fasciatum Remscheid, 1918
- Myzostoma filicauda Graff, 1883
- Myzostoma fimbriatum Graff, 1884
- Myzostoma fisheri Wheeler, 1905
- Myzostoma fissum Graff, 1884
- Myzostoma folium Graff, 1884
- Myzostoma furcatum Graff, 1887
- Myzostoma fuscomaculatum Lanterbecq, Hempson, Griffiths & Eeckhaut, 2008
- Myzostoma gardineri Atkins, 1927
- Myzostoma gerlachei Fauvel, 1936
- Myzostoma giganteum Nansen, 1885
- Myzostoma gigas Luetken in Graff, 1884
- Myzostoma glabrum Leuckart in Graff, 1877
- Myzostoma gopalai Subramaniam in George, 1943
- Myzostoma graffi Nansen, 1885
- Myzostoma holotuberculatum Jägersten, 1940
- Myzostoma horologium Graff, 1884
- Myzostoma ijimai Hara & Okada, 1921
- Myzostoma inflator Graff, 1883
- Myzostoma ingolfi Jägersten, 1940
- Myzostoma insigne Atkins, 1927
- Myzostoma intermedium Graff, 1884
- Myzostoma irregulare Graff, 1883
- Myzostoma japonicum McClendon, 1906
- Myzostoma josefinae Summers & Rouse in Summers, Al-Hakim & Rouse, 2014
- Myzostoma khanhkhoaensis Kolbasova & Mekhova, 2019
- Myzostoma kymae Summers & Rouse in Summers, Al-Hakim & Rouse, 2014
- Myzostoma labiatum Graff, 1884
- Myzostoma laingense Eeckhaut, Grygier & Deheyn, 1998
- Myzostoma lobatum Graff, 1877
- Myzostoma longimanum Jägersten, 1934
- Myzostoma longipes Graff, 1883
- Myzostoma longitergum Eeckhaut, Grygier & Deheyn, 1998
- Myzostoma luetkeni Graff, 1884
- Myzostoma maculatum Jägersten, 1937
- Myzostoma marginatum Graff, 1883
- Myzostoma mertoni Remscheid, 1918
- Myzostoma metacrini McClendon, 1906
- Myzostoma moebianum Graff, 1884
- Myzostoma mortenseni Jägersten, 1940
- Myzostoma murrayi Graff, 1883
- Myzostoma nanseni Graff, 1887
- Myzostoma nigrescens Graff, 1884
- Myzostoma nigromaculatum Eeckhaut, Grygier & Deheyn, 1998
- Myzostoma oblongum Graff, 1883
- Myzostoma pallidum Graff, 1877
- Myzostoma parasiticum Leuckart, 1827
- Myzostoma pentacrini Graff, 1884
- Myzostoma pictum Graff, 1883
- Myzostoma platypus Graff, 1887
- Myzostoma plicatum Graff, 1884
- Myzostoma pluvinar von Graff, 1884
- Myzostoma polycyclus Atkins, 1927
- Myzostoma pottsi Atkins, 1927
- Myzostoma pseudocuniculus Lanterbecq & Eeckhaut, 2003
- Myzostoma pseudogigas Jägersten, 1940
- Myzostoma pulvinar Graff, 1884
- Myzostoma quadricaudatum Graff, 1884
- Myzostoma quadrifilum Graff, 1884
- Myzostoma radiatum Graff in Clark, 1921
- Myzostoma robustum Okada, 1921
- Myzostoma rotundum Graff, 1883
- Myzostoma rubrofasciatum Graff, 1884
- Myzostoma schultzeanum Diesing, 1858
- Myzostoma seymourcollegiorum Rouse & Grygier, 2005 (note that this species has not been verified by a taxonomic editor)
- Myzostoma smithi McClendon, 1906
- Myzostoma stochoeides Atkins, 1927
- Myzostoma striata George, 1943
- Myzostoma sulcatum Remscheid, 1918
- Myzostoma taeniatum Remscheid, 1918
- Myzostoma tentaculatum Jägersten, 1940
- Myzostoma tenuispinum Graff, 1884
- Myzostoma terminale Jägersten, 1937
- Myzostoma testudo Graff, 1883
- Myzostoma thompsoni Diesing, 1858
- Myzostoma toliarense Lanterbecq & Eeckhaut, 2003
- Myzostoma triste Graff, 1887
- Myzostoma tuberculatum Jägersten, 1937
- Myzostoma tuberculosum Semper, 1859
- Myzostoma vastum Graff, 1883
- Myzostoma verrucosum Graff, 1877
- Myzostoma vincentinum Reichensperger, 1906
- Myzostoma viride Atkins, 1927
- Myzostoma wheeleri McClendon, 1906
- Myzostoma willemoesii Graff, 1884
- Myzostoma wyvillethompsoni Graff, 1884

== Synonyms ==
According to the World Register of Marine Species, the genus Myzostomun is a synonym of this genus.
