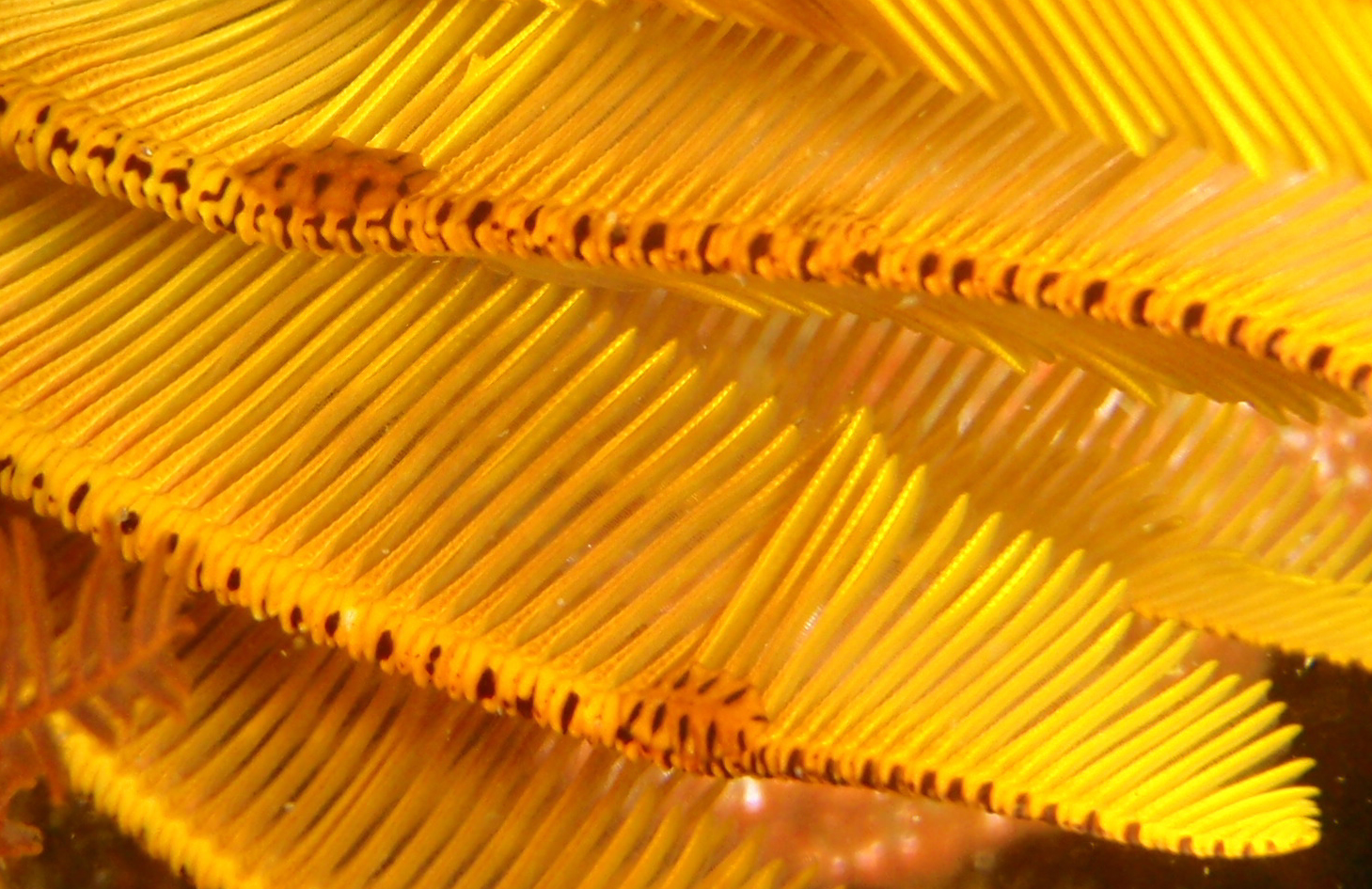
- Myzostoma fuscomaculatum on its host the crinoid Tropiometra carinata

Scientific classification
- Kingdom: Animalia
- Phylum: Echinodermata
- Class: Crinoidea
- Order: Comatulida
- Superfamily: Tropiometroidea
- Family: Tropiometridae; A. H. Clark, 1907
- Genus: Tropiometra; A. H. Clark, 1907

Species
- See text

= Tropiometra =

Genus of crinoids

Tropiometra is a genus of crinoids in the monotypic family Tropiometridae.

== Species ==
The following species are found in this genus:

- Tropiometra afra (Hartlaub, 1890)
- Tropiometra carinata (Lamarck, 1816)
- Tropiometra macrodiscus (Hara, 1895)
- Tropiometra magnifica AH Clark, 1936
