= Promachocrinus fragarius =

Scientific classification
- Kingdom: Animalia
- Phylum: Echinodermata
- Class: Crinoidea
- Superorder: Articulata
- Order: Comatulida
- Family: Antedonidae
- Genus: Promachocrinus
- Species: P. fragarius

Binomial name
- Promachocrinus fragarius McLaughlin, Wilson & Rouse, 2023

Species of crinoids

Promachocrinus fragarius, commonly known as the Antarctic strawberry feather star, is a species of stemless, free-swimming crinoid. It was one of several new species of Promachocrinus to be described in 2023. The discovery of the species gained significant media attention.

== Description ==
The team which discovered the species said it was dubbed the 'Antarctic strawberry feather star' due to "the resemblance of its body to a strawberry". Its colour can range from "purple" to "dark-reddish", and it was described as having "ten rays" and "twenty arms".

== Distribution and habitat ==
P. fragarius is found in the waters of Antarctica at depths between 65 m (213 ft) and 1,170 m (3,840 ft). The type locality is at the South Sandwich Islands.

The dispersal of Promachocrinus larvae was heavily influenced by Antarctic currents.
