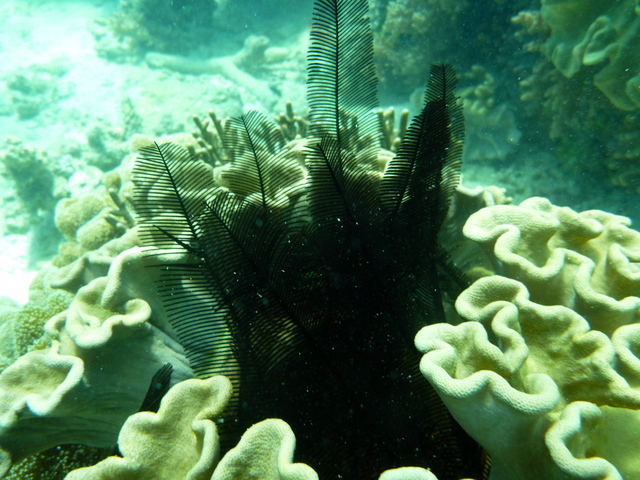

Scientific classification
- Domain: Eukaryota
- Kingdom: Animalia
- Phylum: Echinodermata
- Class: Crinoidea
- Order: Comatulida
- Family: Tropiometridae
- Genus: Tropiometra
- Species: T. afra

Binomial name
- Tropiometra afra (Hartlaub, 1890)

Synonyms
- Antedon afra Hartlaub, 1890; Tropiometra afra subsp. afra (Hartlaub, 1890)

= Tropiometra afra =

Species of echinoderm

Tropiometra afra is a species of feather star in the family Tropiometridae. The nominate subspecies T. a. afra occurs around New Zealand as well as Australia (Lord Howe Island, Fremantle, and New South Wales)., while the subspecies T. a. macrodiscus is found at Hong Kong, Japan, and the Bonin islands; it is the most common crinoid species in Hong Kong.
