= Annametra =

Scientific classification
- Domain: Eukaryota
- Kingdom: Animalia
- Phylum: Echinodermata
- Class: Crinoidea
- Order: Comatulida
- Family: Antedonidae
- Subfamily: Antedoninae
- Genus: Annametra; AH Clark, 1936

Genus of feather stars

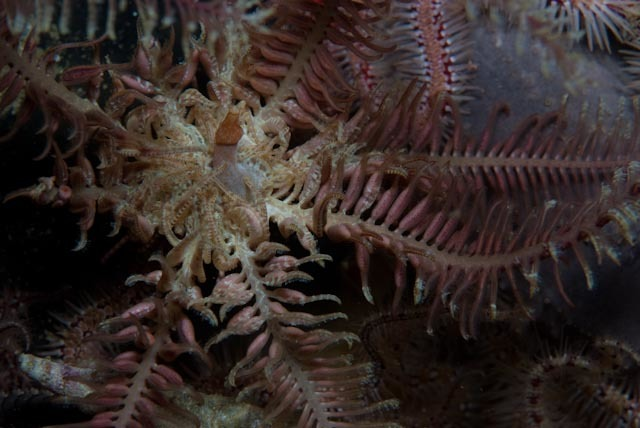
Annametra occidentalis

Annametra is a genus of crinoids in the family Antedonidae, subfamily Antedoninae (Norman, 1865), first described by Clark, A. H. in 1936.

== Species ==
There are two accepted species in the genus:

- Annametra minuta AH Clark, 1907
- Annametra occidentalis (AH Clark, 1915)
