= Endomyzostomatidae =

Scientific classification
- Domain: Eukaryota
- Kingdom: Animalia
- Phylum: Annelida
- Class: Polychaeta
- Order: Myzostomida
- Family: Endomyzostomatidae

Family of annelids

Endomyzostomatidae is a family of polychaetes belonging to the order Myzostomida.

Genus:

- Endomyzostoma Perrier, 1897
- Mycomyzostoma Eeckhaut, 1998
