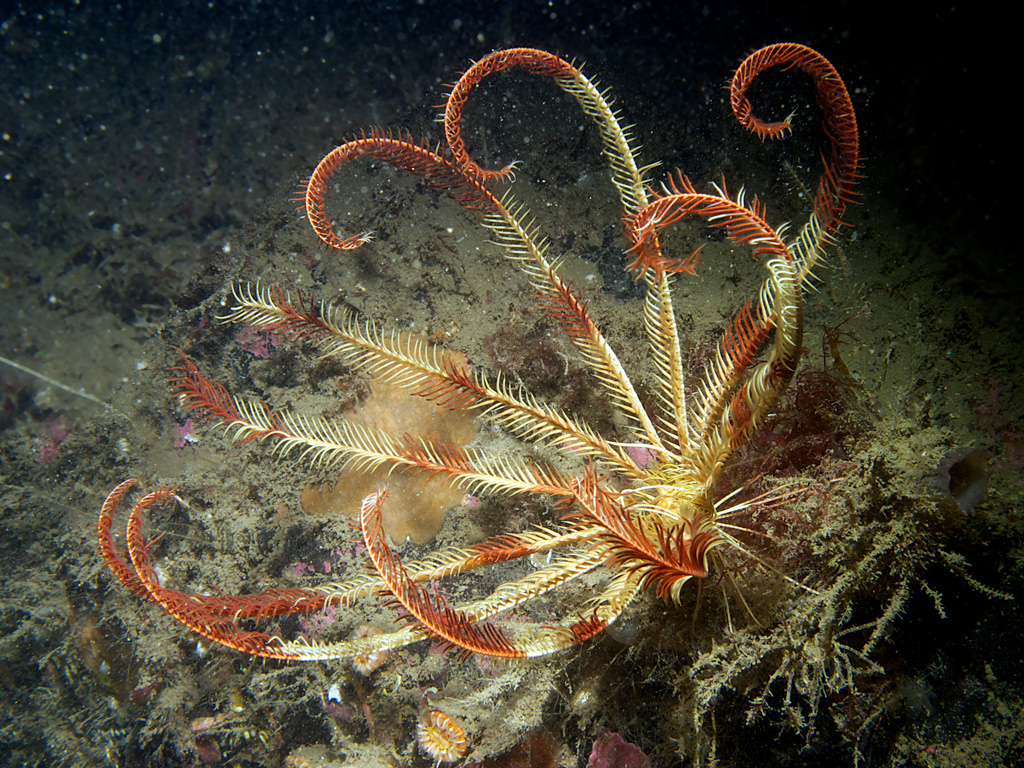
- Leptometra celtica

Scientific classification
- Kingdom: Animalia
- Phylum: Echinodermata
- Class: Crinoidea
- Superorder: Articulata
- Order: Comatulida
- Family: Antedonidae
- Genus: Leptometra; A.H. Clark, 1908

Species
- See text

= Leptometra =

Genus of crinoids

Leptometra is a genus of free-swimming, stemless crinoids.

== Characteristics ==
Members of this genus have no stems but have five pairs of feathery arms arising from a central concave disc. There are a number of long cirri or unbranched appendages on a low, cone-shaped dorsal ossicle, a bone-like structure in the centre of the disc.

== Species ==
The following species are recognised in the World Register of Marine Species:

- Leptometra celtica (McAndrew & Barrett, 1857)
- Leptometra phalangium (Müller, 1841)
