= Zelandimetra =

Scientific classification
- Kingdom: Animalia
- Phylum: Echinodermata
- Class: Crinoidea
- Superorder: Articulata
- Order: Comatulida
- Superfamily: Notocrinoidea
- Family: Notocrinidae
- Genus: †Zelandimetra; Eagle, 2008
- Species: †Z. neozelandiae

Binomial name
- †Zelandimetra neozelandiae Eagle, 2008

Extinct genus of crinoids

Zelandimetra is an extinct genus of crinoids in the family Notocrinidae. The genus is monotypic, containing one species, Zelandimetra neozelandiae, a fossil taxon dating from the Late Oligocene found in New Zealand.

== Description ==
Members of the genus have a discoidal centrodorsal, with an evenly eroded centrodorsal cavity without coelomic impressions or radial pits. Members of the genus can be identified due to the cirrus sockets being arranged in columns and circular.

== Taxonomy ==
The genus was first described by Michael K. Eagle in 2008, based on fossils found in Late Oligocene formations in New Zealand, including the Meyers Pass Limestone Member and the Otekaike Limestone Formation. Eagle described both the genus Zelandimetra and species Z. neozelandiae in the same paper. Paratypes of the species are held at the Auckland War Memorial Museum.

The genus name Zelandimetra was formed by combining New Zealand, the country of where the fossils were discovered, with the suffix metra ("combining form"). The species epithet neozelandiae was similarly named after New Zealand.
