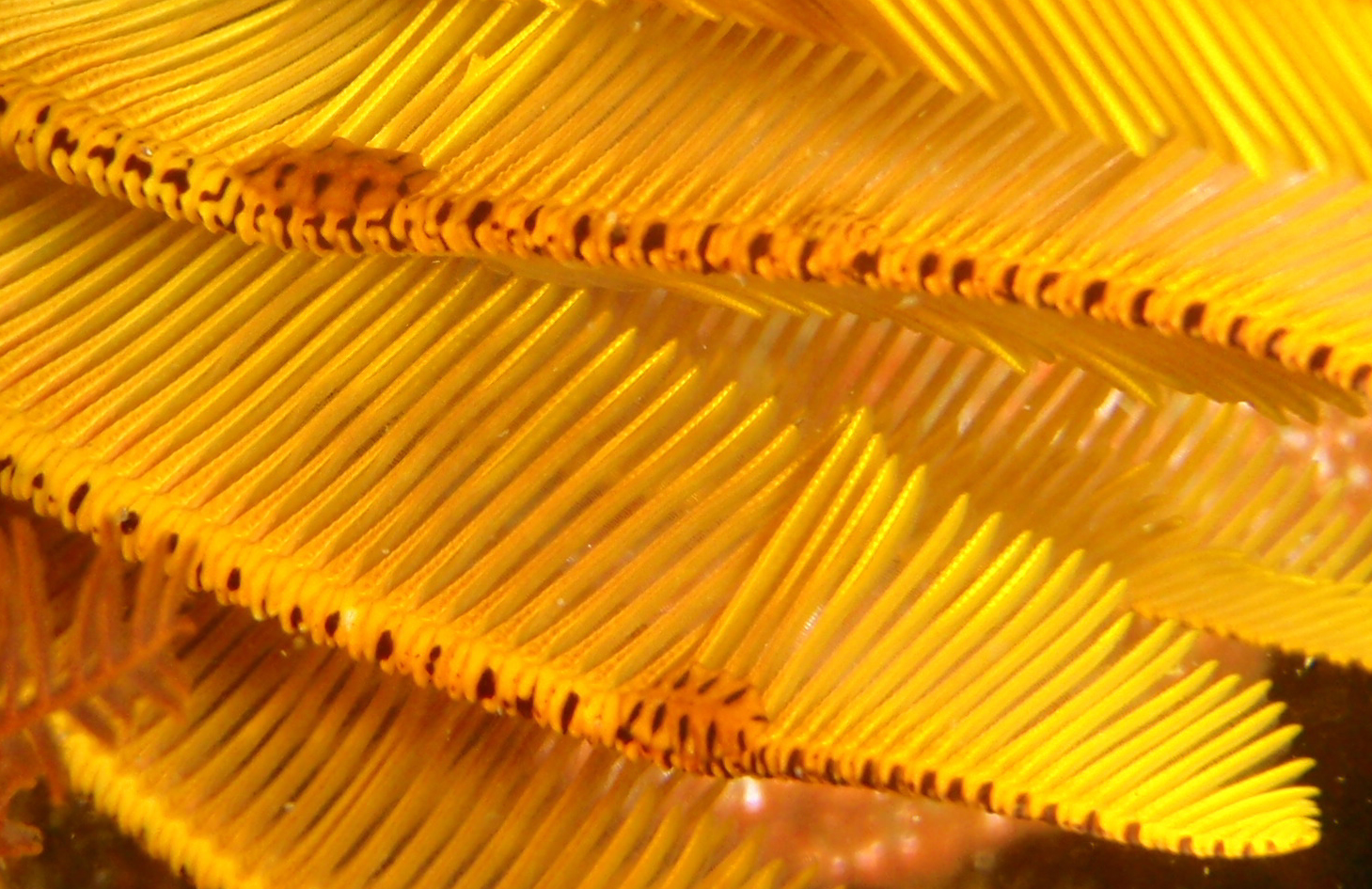

Scientific classification
- Kingdom: Animalia
- Phylum: Annelida
- Clade: Pleistoannelida
- Order: Myzostomida
- Family: Myzostomatidae
- Genus: Myzostoma
- Species: M. fuscomaculatum

Binomial name
- Myzostoma fuscomaculatum Lanterbecq, Hempson, Griffiths & Eeckhaut, 2008

= Myzostoma fuscomaculatum =

Species of marine worm that lives on the elegant feather star

Myzostoma fuscomaculatum, the crinoid worm, is a species of marine worm in the family Myzostomatidae.

== Description ==
Crinoid worms are tiny worms with stubby legs which live on the elegant feather star, Tropiometra carinata. They are usually well camouflaged to match their host. They grow to 2mm in total length.

== Distribution ==
Crinoid worms are found off the South African coast in False Bay in 10m to at least 35m of water. They appear to be endemic.

== Ecology ==
These animals are parasitic on their host crinoid and eat scraps of its food and any waste products.
