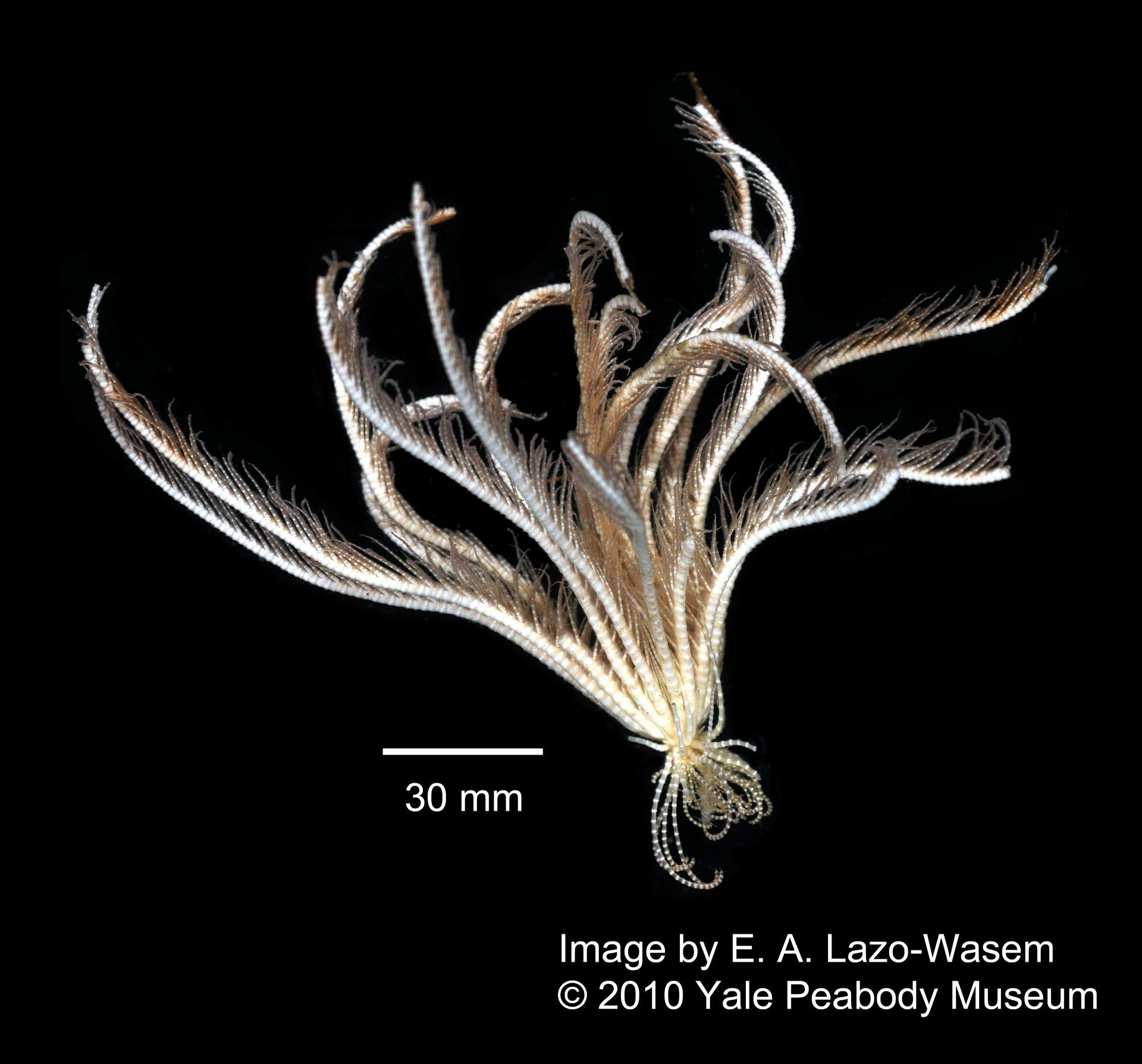
- Promachocrinus kerguelensis

Scientific classification
- Kingdom: Animalia
- Phylum: Echinodermata
- Class: Crinoidea
- Superorder: Articulata
- Order: Comatulida
- Family: Antedonidae
- Genus: Promachocrinus; Carpenter, 1879

= Promachocrinus =

Genus of crinoids

Promachocrinus is a genus of free-swimming, stemless crinoids. It was a monotypic genus, with the only species in the genus being Promachocrinus kerguelensis, until the discovery of four new species, establishment of two others previously described and the transfer of another species to the genus in 2023. Known for being coldwater crinoids, members of Promachocrinus are typically found in the seas around Antarctica and surrounding island groups, including under the sea ice. Previously known for having 20 arms, two of the species now included in the genus have 10 arms. Many of the species are circum-Antarctic and can be difficult to tell apart without DNA sequencing.

== Species ==
There are eight accepted species of Promachocrinus as of August 2023:

- Promachocrinus fragarius McLaughlin, Wilson and Rouse 2023
- Promachocrinus joubini Vaney, 1910
- Promachocrinus kerguelensis Carpenter, 1879; Type species
- Promachocrinus mawsoni (Clark, 1937)
- Promachocrinus unruhi McLaughlin, Wilson and Rouse 2023
- Promachocrinus uskglassi McLaughlin, Wilson and Rouse 2023
- Promachocrinus vanhoeffenianus Minckert, 1905
- Promachocrinus wattsorum McLaughlin, Wilson and Rouse 2023
