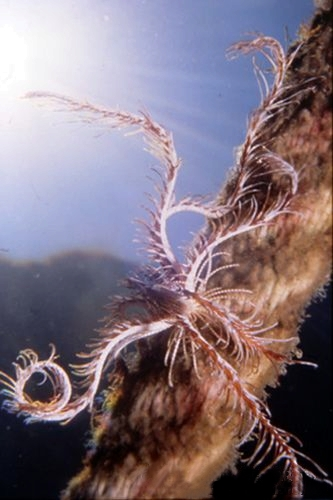
- Antedon mediterranea clinging to a cable with its cirri

Scientific classification
- Kingdom: Animalia
- Phylum: Echinodermata
- Class: Crinoidea
- Order: Comatulida
- Family: Antedonidae
- Genus: Antedon
- Species: A. mediterranea

Binomial name
- Antedon mediterranea (Lamarck, 1816)

Synonyms
- Antedon adriatica AH Clark, 1911; Comatula annulata Risso, 1826; Comatula mediterranea Lamarck, 1816

= Antedon mediterranea =

Species of crinoid

Antedon mediterranea is a species of stalkless crinoid in the family Antedonidae, commonly known as the Mediterranean feather star. It is found on the seabed at moderate depths in the Mediterranean Sea. It is a filter feeder and captures plankton with its long feathery arms.

== Description ==
Antedon mediterranea has a vestigial stalk, the base of which bears up to forty grasping cirri, articulated prehensile structures with which it can cling to a hard surface. Above this is the calyx, a small, cup-shaped structure, which is surrounded by five pairs of arms which bear feathery pinnules. The arms can be rolled up if danger threatens, but when they are extended to feed, they are about 10 cm (4 in) long. They are fragile but if one gets broken off, the animal can regenerate it. The colour of this crinoid is quite variable and ranges from white, yellow, orange or red to brown and dark purple, sometimes with bands of contrasting colour.

== Distribution and habitat ==
Antedon mediterranea is found in the Mediterranean and Aegean Seas and westward to the south coast of Spain and Cape St. Vincent. It is found at depths down to about 80 metres (260 ft) and favours areas with strong currents which bring plenty of food within reach. It is found on rocky or sandy seabeds rich in algae including encrusting algae, or among sea grasses (Posidonia oceanica). It hides during the day in concealed locations emerging at night into more exposed areas. It is gregarious and is often found clinging to sea whips, bryozoans, algae or sea grasses.

== Biology ==
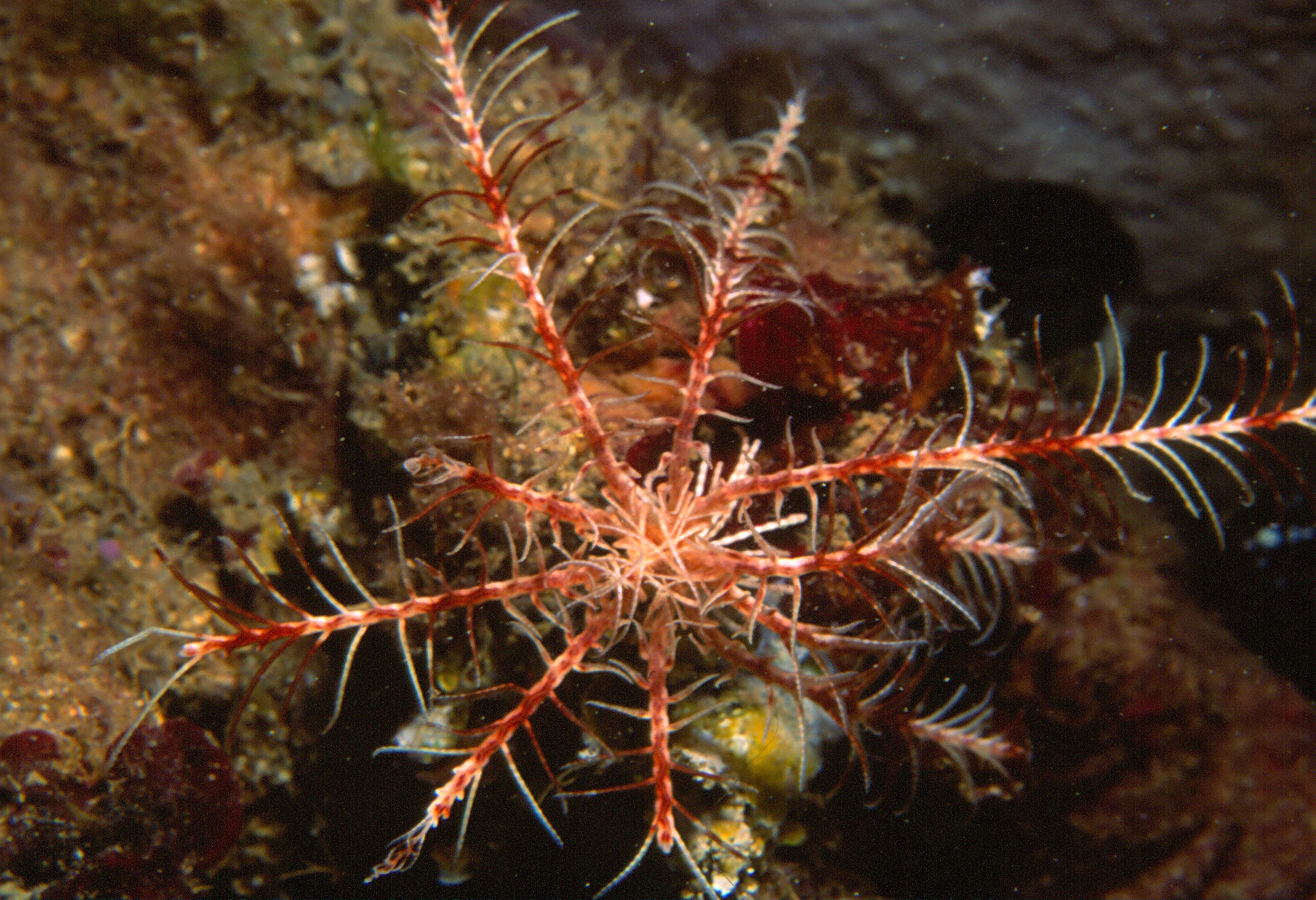
Antedon mediterranea

Antedon mediterranea feeds by filtering out plankton and other small particles from the passing sea water. The food is then wrapped in mucus and passed by the tube feet down the ambulacral grooves on the arms to the central mouth which is on the upper side of the calyx. Antedon mediterranea can move around to a limited extent by creeping on its cirri, by "swimming", alternately raising and lowering its ten arms five at a time, or by "walking" along the seabed by propping itself up on its arm tips and heaving itself along.

The sexes are separate in Antedon mediterranea and the gonads are located in the pinnules of the lower part of the arms. Spawning takes place annually, mainly in the spring and is believed to be triggered by the production of testosterone in the male and 17β-estradiol in the female. Fertilisation takes place in the water and the embryos are cemented to the pinnules. They hatch into free-swimming, barrel-shaped doliolaria larvae which can move around using synchronized movements of their bands of cilia. The production of serotonin stimulates them to settle on the seabed, anchor themselves by temporary stalks, and undergo metamorphosis into juveniles.
