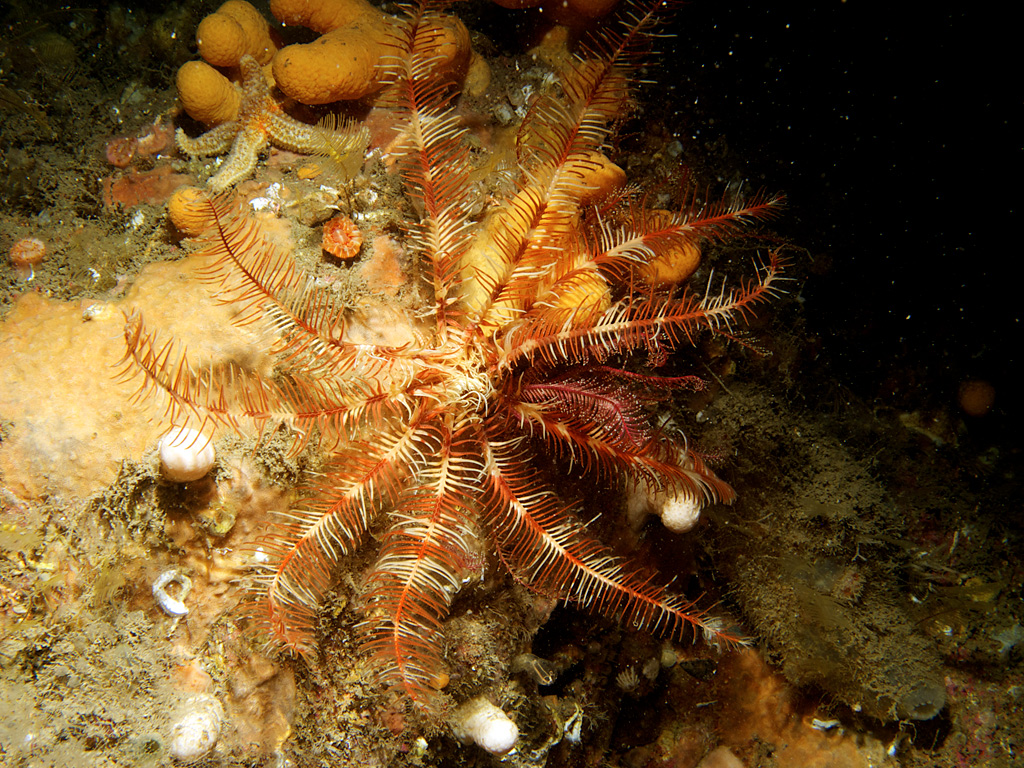

Scientific classification
- Kingdom: Animalia
- Phylum: Echinodermata
- Class: Crinoidea
- Superorder: Articulata
- Order: Comatulida
- Family: Antedonidae
- Genus: Antedon
- Species: A. petasus

Binomial name
- Antedon petasus Düben & Koren, 1846

Synonyms
- Alecto petasus Düben & Koren, 1846

= Antedon petasus =

Species of crinoid

Antedon petasus is a marine invertebrate, a species of crinoid or feather star in the family Antedonidae. It is found around the coasts of north west Europe.

== Description ==
Antedon petasus has a conical disc with five pairs of arms, each up to 10 cm (3.9 in) long and fringed with pinnules, giving it a feathery appearance. The pinnules are smooth on the underside and are varyingly coloured in blotches of white, red and brown. On the underside of the disc are 50-100 short curled cirri with which the animal moves around and clings to the substrate.

== Distribution and habitat ==
Antedon petasus is found on the coasts of north west Europe, the range extending from Scandinavia south to Britain. It typically occurs at depths of 20–100 m (66–328 ft). It is a more northerly species than Antedon bifida and displaces it in deeper waters. It can be found clinging to rocks and boulders, kelp and sessile invertebrates with its clawed cirri, preferring positions with a strong current.

== Biology ==
Antedon petasus is a suspension feeder, catching detritus and plankton with the tube feet on its pinnules.

Both male and female A. petasus liberate gametes into the water column from their genital organs situated at the base of certain specialised arms. The eggs develop into free-swimming larvae which later settle onto a solid surface where they attach themselves by a short stalk and are known as pentacrinoid larvae. Eventually they develop clawed cirri and detach themselves from their stalks.
