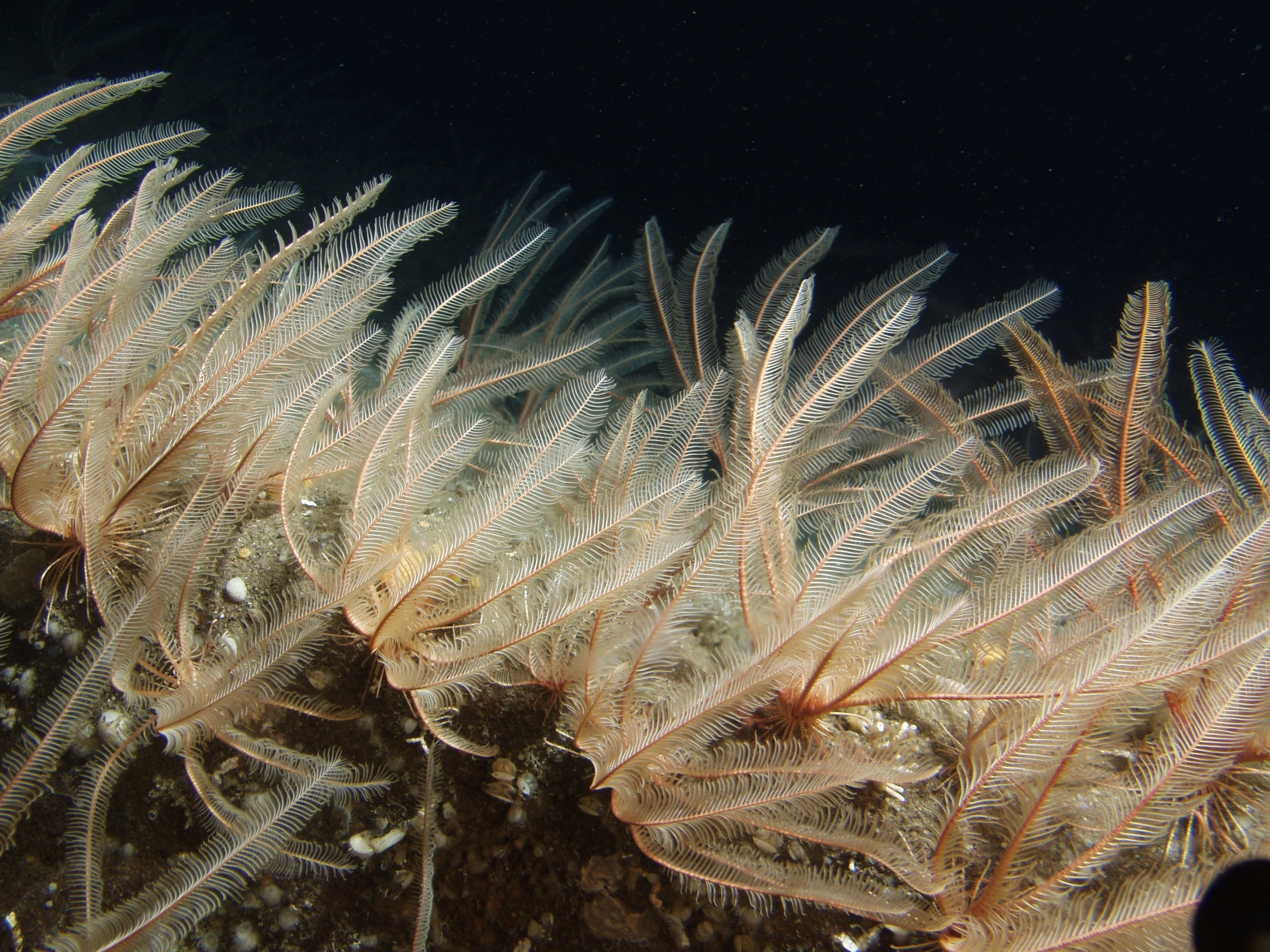

Scientific classification
- Kingdom: Animalia
- Phylum: Echinodermata
- Class: Crinoidea
- Superorder: Articulata
- Order: Comatulida
- Family: Antedonidae
- Genus: Florometra
- Species: F. serratissima

Binomial name
- Florometra serratissima (A.H. Clark, 1907)

= Florometra serratissima =

Species of crinoid

Florometra serratissima is a species of crinoid or feather star in the family Antedonidae. It is found off the Pacific coast of North America, usually in deep water.

== Description ==
The mouth is located on the upper side at the centre of the calyx, with the anus nearby. Surrounding the calyx are five jointed limbs. These branch at the base to form ten or more arms, each of which has jointed appendages known as pinnules growing from it, in a feather-like fashion. The centre of each arm has an ambulacral groove down which food particles are moved by cilia to the mouth. When the arms are fully extended to either side, the crinoid may measure 25 cm (10 in) across. On the aboral (under) surface are clawlike cirri which grasp the seabed. This feather star is reddish-brown. Juveniles have a long stalk.

== Distribution ==
Florometra serratissima is native to the Pacific coast of North America, its range extending from the Shumagin Islands and Sanak Islands off Alaska southward to Isla Natividad off Baja California. Its depth range is from 11 to 1,252 m (36 to 4,108 ft), but it is more commonly found in deep water. It lives deeper in warmer waters, and climbs shallower in colder waters, past Canada.

This species is the only living crinoid observable in the American Pacific Ocean, although only the most experienced divers can reach it.

== Ecology ==
These crinoids can live on either rocks or soft sediment, and can move around using their cirri as feet, or can swim by beating their arms; they are suspension feeders, choosing locations with strong currents and extending their arms to catch plankton floating past. Although the arms of F. serratissima have special joints known as syzygies where they are designed to part when stressed, researchers grasping this crinoid found the arms invariably broke off at the base. If it loses an arm, by autotomy or predation, the arm can be regenerated, the speed of regeneration being independent of whether the regrowth is happening from a long or a short stump.
