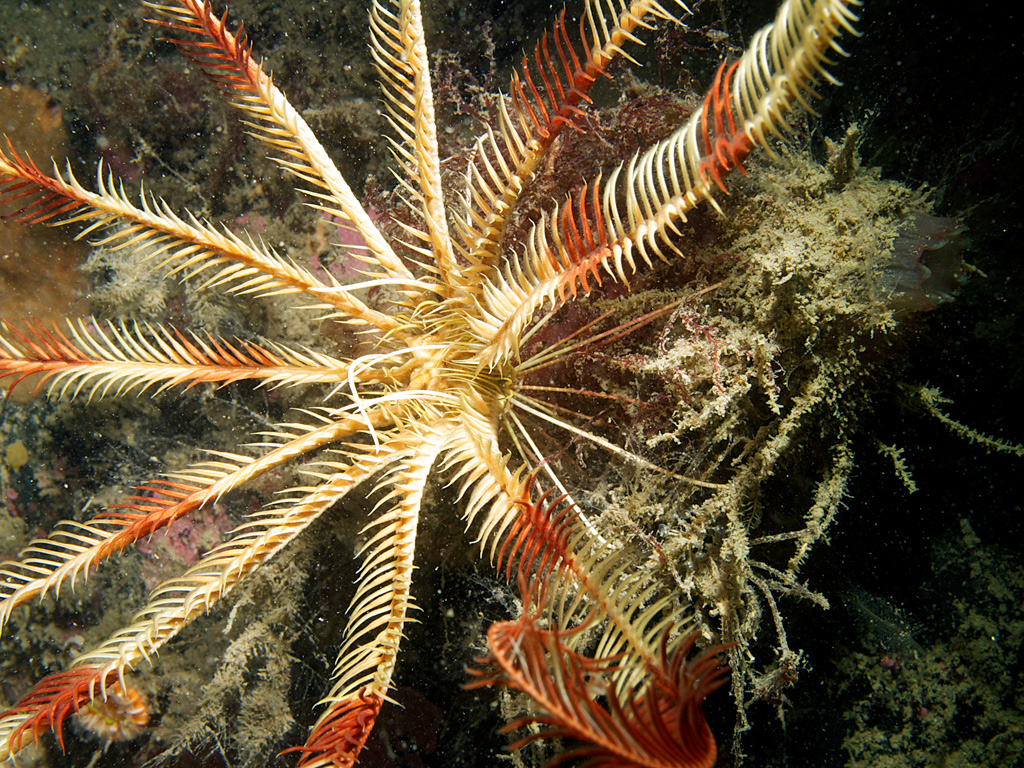

Scientific classification
- Kingdom: Animalia
- Phylum: Echinodermata
- Class: Crinoidea
- Order: Comatulida
- Family: Antedonidae
- Genus: Leptometra
- Species: L. celtica

Binomial name
- Leptometra celtica McAndrew & Barrett, 1857

Synonyms
- Comatula woodwardii Barrett, 1857 (not of Forbes, 1852)

= Leptometra celtica =

Species of crinoid

Leptometra celtica is a marine invertebrate and species of crinoid or feather star of the Leptometra genus in the family Antedonidae. It is found in the Atlantic Ocean around the coasts of north west Europe. The presence of L. celtica and L. phalangium (its counterpart in the Mediterranean) is considered to be a good indication of nearby shelf breaks, general bottom currents, and areas of high gross productivity as they are suspension-feeders, hence their proliferation in productive environments.

== Description ==
Leptometra celtica has ten pinnate arms that are typically 7–10 cm in length with neatly held side branches. The arms may be banded in red and white or plain coloured in brown, white or red. In areas of moderate current, specimens have been observed to spread their arms out into a vertical fan across the current.

The cirri of L. celtica are about 34–40 mm in length and vary in color from green to white. They are arranged in irregular columns dimorphically about the organism's stalk allowing for locomotion and attachment to deep sea structures. Examination of cirri can help distinguish L. celtica from the related L. phalangium as the cirri of L. celtica are shorter in proportion and are not evenly tapered distally. The distal segments of the cirri have their distal edge slightly swollen so that the organism's dorsal profile retains a slightly scalloped appearance in comparison to L. phalangium.

L. celtica has short proximal oral pinnule segments protruding from its stalk to allow for feeding. Its oral pinnules are arranged in irregular columns are somewhat shorter in length in comparison to L. phalangium. The four lowest pinnules average between 12 and 17 mm.

The opening of the centrodorsal cavity in L. celtica is only 0.35 of the centrodorsal diameter, making it similar to that of other species of antedonids.

== Distribution and habitat ==
L. celtica can be found in the Atlantic Ocean ranging from the coasts of the United Kingdom and Faroe Islands to the Moroccan coast. The species has been found at depths between 20 and 1247 m in the western Mediterranean and has been studied in the Algarve region on the southwest coast of Portugal. L. celtica has also been studied along shelf breaks ranging from northwest Spain to the southwest coasts of Ireland. The species can be typically found in sandy to muddy sand types of sediment.

== Ecology ==
Leptometra celtica are suspension feeders that take in organic particles that fall from the photic zone. Shelf-break upwelling and water turbulence increases the transportation of organic matter up the water column, leading to high-concentrations of crinoids like L. celtica that feed on organic matter around these shelf breaks. The species plays an important role in marine environments by taking in large amounts of organic particles and regulating food chain production. For this reason, the presence of benthopelagic fish alongside crinoids like L. celtica can serve as indicators of highly productive regions of shelf-breaks.

== Human impact ==
Several studies have focused on the impact of bottom trawling and dredging on crinoid communities along the coast. L. celtica has been found in crinoid beds with a high abundance of juvenile commercial fish and crustacea, and research has shown that heavily towed benthic environments have much lower numbers of crinoid taxa like L. celtica.
