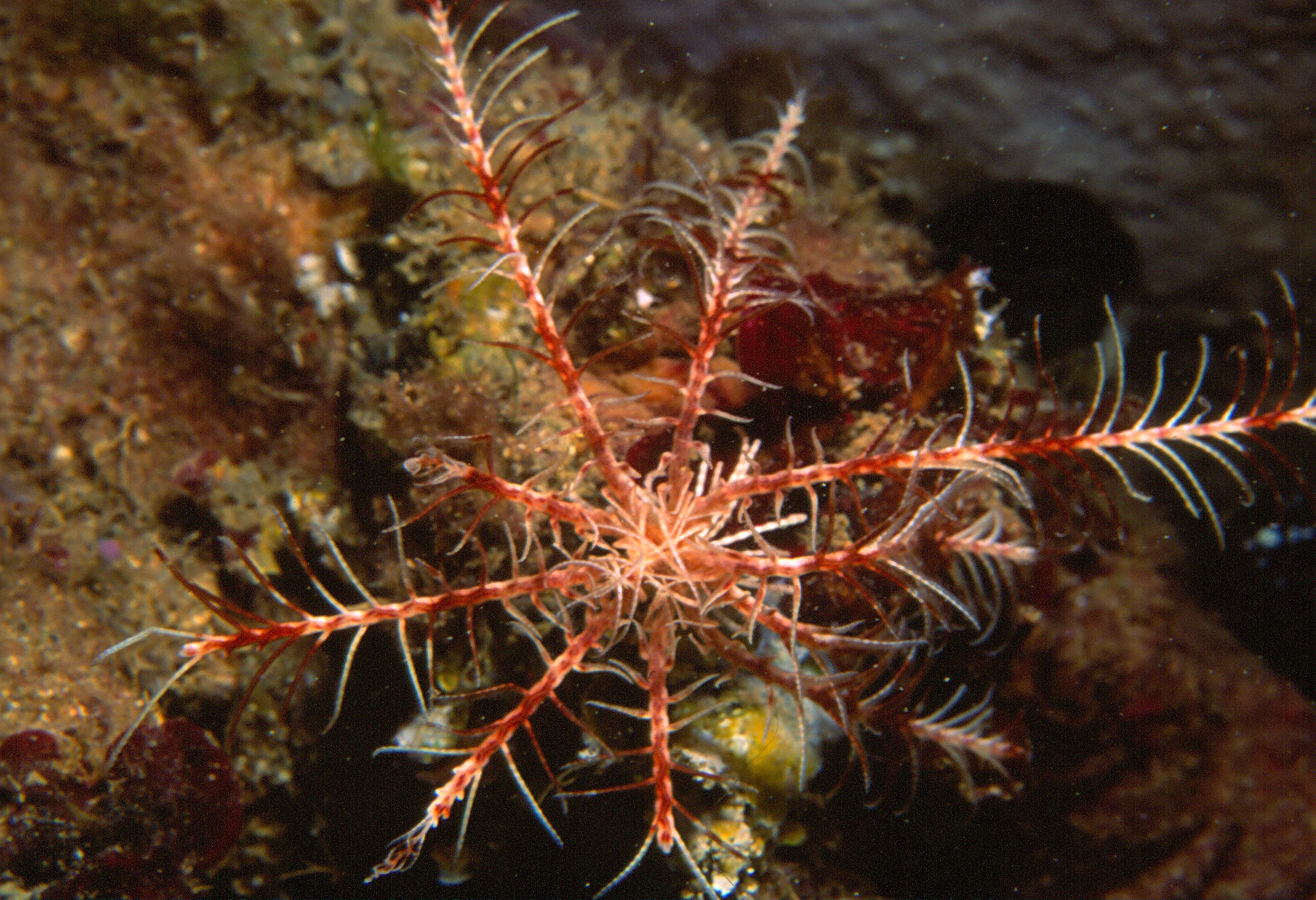
- Antedon mediterranea

Scientific classification
- Kingdom: Animalia
- Phylum: Echinodermata
- Class: Crinoidea
- Order: Comatulida
- Family: Antedonidae
- Subfamily: Antedoninae
- Genus: Antedon de Freminville, 1811

Species
- See text

= Antedon =

Antedon Temporal range: Cretaceous - Recent

Genus of crinoids

Antedon is a genus of sessile, stemless crinoids found in shallow tropical and temperate marine environments worldwide. The genus first appears in the fossil record during the Cretaceous period.

== Characteristics ==
Members of this genus have no stems but have five pairs of feathery arms arising from a central concave disc. There are a number of cirri or unbranched appendages on a low, cone-shaped dorsal ossicle, a bone-like structure in the centre of the disc. The mouth and the ambulacral grooves are also on the upper surface. Clawed cirri on the lower surface provide temporary attachment to the substrate. There is great variability in the morphological features in antedonids found in different habitats and the main distinguishing feature among the species is the number of cirri.

== Feeding ==
Antedon is a filter feeder, feeding on small particules within the water column. Their feeding rhythms were observed and they tend to feed almost continuously. Antedon does not feed with a diurnal rhythm and they feed at all times of the day including at night. They show no proof that the feed via a tidal feeding rhythm either and even when at the bottom of the sea floor at 50 cm/s current speeds, their arms continue to flap. Antedon posture while feeding reveals an arrangement of pinnules along the arms. These pinnules function in triplets along each side of the arm and demonstrate a triplanar arrangement characteristic.

== Reproduction ==
Both male and female A. mediterranea exhibited five distinct reproductive stages: recovery, growing, premature, mature, and spent. Sex differences are at the gonopore level, they are not hermaphroditic. Analysis of reproductive stage frequencies from 2003 to 2005 indicated seasonal periodicity, with the highest maturity levels occurring in spring and the lowest in winter. Testosterone and 17β-estradiol were detected in A. mediterranea tissues, with their levels fluctuating throughout the reproductive cycle. This variation suggests a potential correlation between steroid hormone concentrations and observable reproductive stages, hinting at their role in reproductive regulation.

Crinoids generally lack sexual dimorphism, except in species with brood pouches, transparent pinnules, or those that brood embryos on the outer surface of the genital pinnules, such as Antedon bifida and A. mediterranea. In these species, the gonads are typically housed within the genital pinnules and are distributed along the proximal to intermediate regions of the arms.

In adult crinoids, the reproductive system originates from a genital strand within the genital coelom. Each strand contains a haemal lacuna connected to the subtegminal plexus and is supported by a solid cord of germinal and non-germinal cells, known as the genital cord. As these strands extend into the pinnules, they develop into gonads. The gonads are composed of distinct layers. From the outermost to the innermost, they include a squamous visceral peritoneum made up of peritoneocytes, myocytes, and a nerve plexus; a haemal lacuna containing floating cells; and a germinal epithelium that lines the central lumen and consists of both germinal and somatic cells. In males, the germinal epithelium forms multiple folds that project into the lumen, whereas the germinal epithelium in females, developing oocytes gradually migrate into the haemal lacuna.

== Movement ==
- Swimming Mechanism: When stimulated, Antedon swims using alternating movements of its 10 arms, one arm bends ventrally while its paired counterpart performs an aboral stroke. This suggests a mechanism of reciprocal inhibition.
- Coordination: The nervous pentagon, which links the five rays, facilitates coordination. However, impulses weaken as they travel further from their origin, affecting the degree of coordination.
- Righting Response and Negative Stereotropism: When Antedon is placed with its oral side against the aquarium floor, it responds with oral flexion, swimming movements, and self-righting. This behavior suggests a natural aversion to ventral-side contact.
- Cirri and Reflex Interactions: Stimulation of the dorsal cirri triggers aboral bending of all rays and inhibits ventral flexion, preventing righting movements. Conversely, stimulation of the ventral side suppresses the cirri's grasp reflex. This dynamic balance highlights functional symmetry between Antedon’s oral and aboral sides, despite their structural differences.

== Behaviour ==
Many reef-dwelling comatulid species exhibit photophobic behaviors, feeding primarily at night while seeking shelter in rocky crevices or folding their arms and pinnules during daylight hours. Studies have confirmed that Antedon bifida demonstrates negative phototaxis consistent with observations of other shallow-water feather stars that engage in hiding behaviors. However, some species, such as Dorometra nana, exhibit positive phototaxis in response to light, suggesting that photic responses vary by species and environmental conditions, including light intensity. Research indicates that many crinoids’ nocturnal feeding and daytime sheltering are not strictly governed by circadian rhythms but are directly influenced by ambient light levels. In particular, individuals of Heterometra savignii living at greater depths, where light levels remain consistently low, exhibit reduced nocturnal activity while maintaining strong photophobic responses to intense light stimuli. Similarly, A. bifida, which inhabits shallow waters beneath marina pontoons, actively avoids polychromatic white light, a behavior previously reported in natural conditions.

Studies have shown that A. bifida has a pronounced sensitivity to blue light (λmax = 463 nm), demonstrating a strong negative phototactic response. This heightened sensitivity to shorter wavelengths aligns with findings in other echinoderms, including the sea urchin Strongylocentrotus purpuratus, the brittle star Amphiura filiformis, and the sea cucumber Holothuria leucospilota. Blue light sensitivity is ecologically significant, as blue wavelengths penetrate the deepest into the water column and are a dominant component of open water environments.

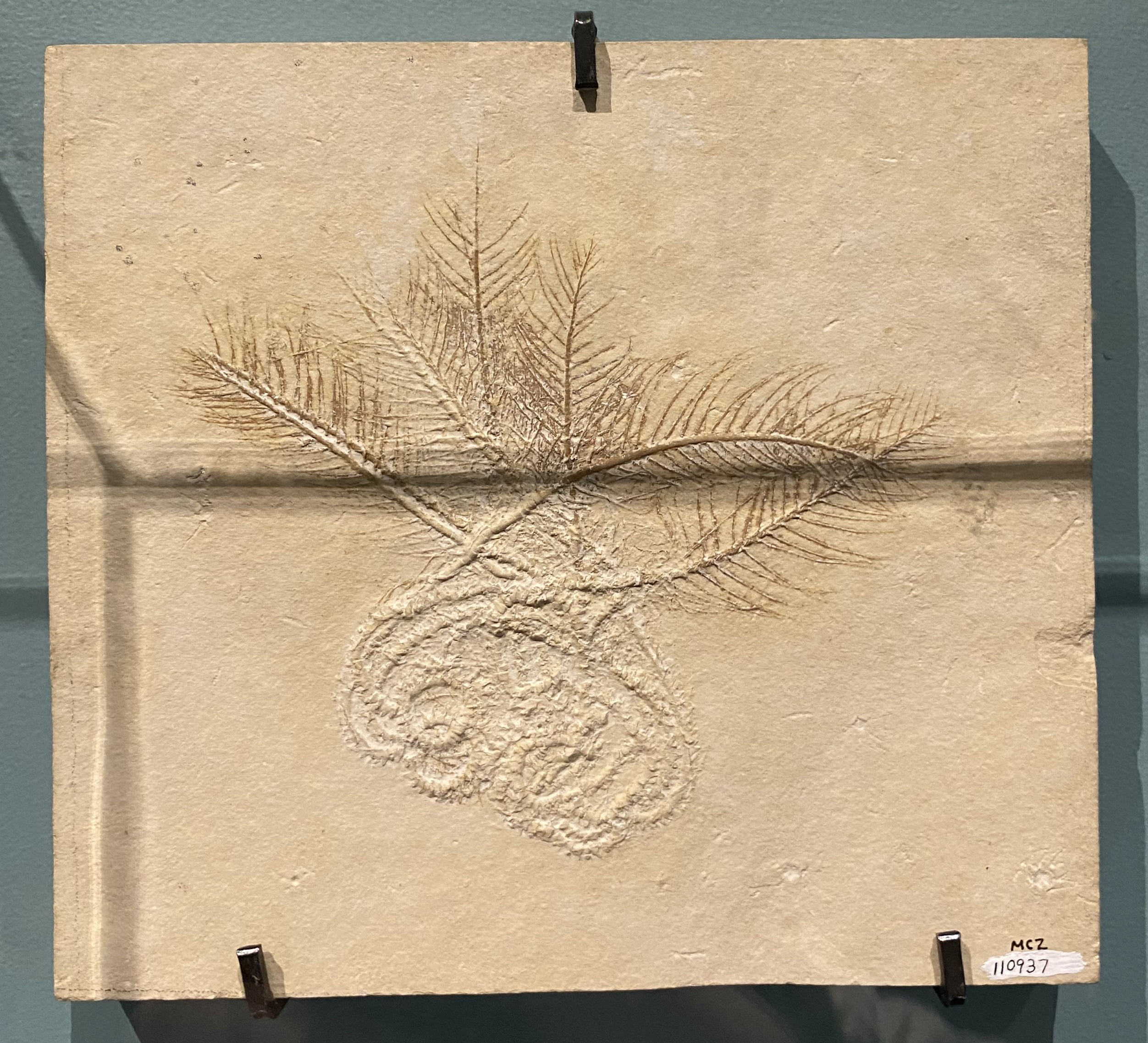
Fossil of Antedon priamtus

Unlike certain reef-dwelling sea stars that exhibit a narrow sensitivity peak around 450 nm due to the presence of a blue-sensitive opsin, A. bifida is responsive to a broader range of light wavelengths. Research has demonstrated significant negative phototaxis in response to red light (λmax = 630 nm). This sensitivity to longer wavelengths is likely an adaptation to its shallow-water habitat, where red light, though quickly absorbed at greater depths, remains present near the sea surface, particularly in the Atlantic and North Sea.

== Species ==
The following species are recognised in the World Register of Marine Species:

- Antedon arabica AH Clark & AM Clark
- Antedon bifida (Pennant, 1777)
- Antedon detonna McKnight, 1977
- Antedon duebeni Böhlsche, 1866
- Antedon hupferi Hartlaub, 1890
- Antedon incommoda Bell, 1888
- Antedon iris (AH Clark, 1912)
- Antedon longicirra (AH Clark, 1912)
- Antedon loveni Bell, 1882
- Antedon mediterranea (Lamarck, 1816)
- Antedon nuttingi (AH Clark, 1936)
- Antedon parviflora (AH Clark, 1912)
- Antedon petasus (Düben & Koren, 1846)
- Antedon serrata AH Clark, 1908
