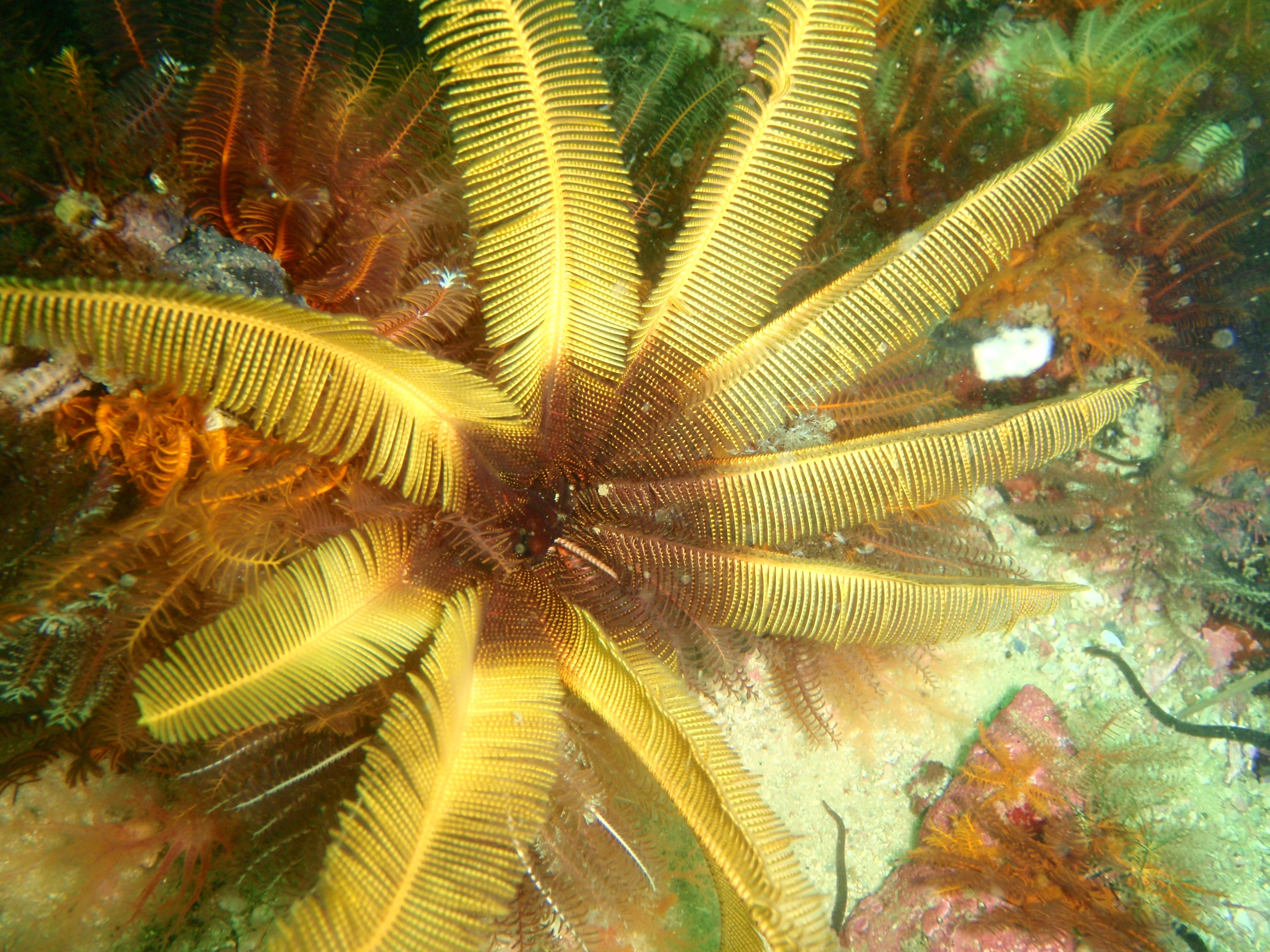

Scientific classification
- Kingdom: Animalia
- Phylum: Echinodermata
- Class: Crinoidea
- Superorder: Articulata
- Order: Comatulida
- Family: Tropiometridae
- Genus: Tropiometra
- Species: T. carinata

Binomial name
- Tropiometra carinata (Lamarck, 1816)

Synonyms
- List: Antedon brasiliensis Carpenter, 1879; Antedon capensis Bell, 1905; Antedon carinata Lamarck, 1816; Comatula carinata Lamarck, 1816 (basionym); Comatula picta Gay, 1854; Tropiometra audouini AH Clark, 1911; Tropiometra carinata audouini AH Clark, 1911; Tropiometra carinata carinata Lamarck, 1816; Tropiometra carinata clarki Gislén, 1938; Tropiometra carinata indica AH Clark, 1912; Tropiometra clarki Gislén, 1938; Tropiometra encrinus AH Clark, 1911; Tropiometra indica AH Clark, 1912; Tropiometra picta Gay, 1854

= Elegant feather star =

Species of echinoderm

The elegant feather star (Tropiometra carinata) is a species of crinoid in the family Tropiometridae.

== Description ==
Elegant feather stars may grow to 20 cm in total length. They are variably coloured in yellow to brown and are occasionally variegated in yellow and brown. They have ten long arms with ciliated side branches that taper to a point. They have 20-30 cirri per arm.

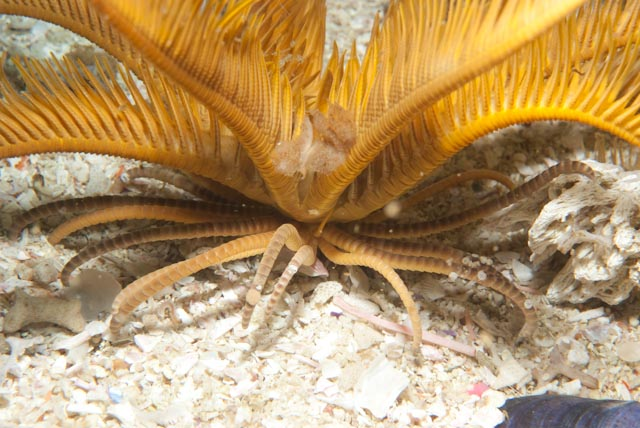
The cirri of the elegant feather star

== Distribution ==
These animals are found off the South African coast from the Cape Peninsula to Mozambique as well as circumtropically. They are seen subtidally, up to at least 51 metres (167 ft) deep.

== Ecology ==
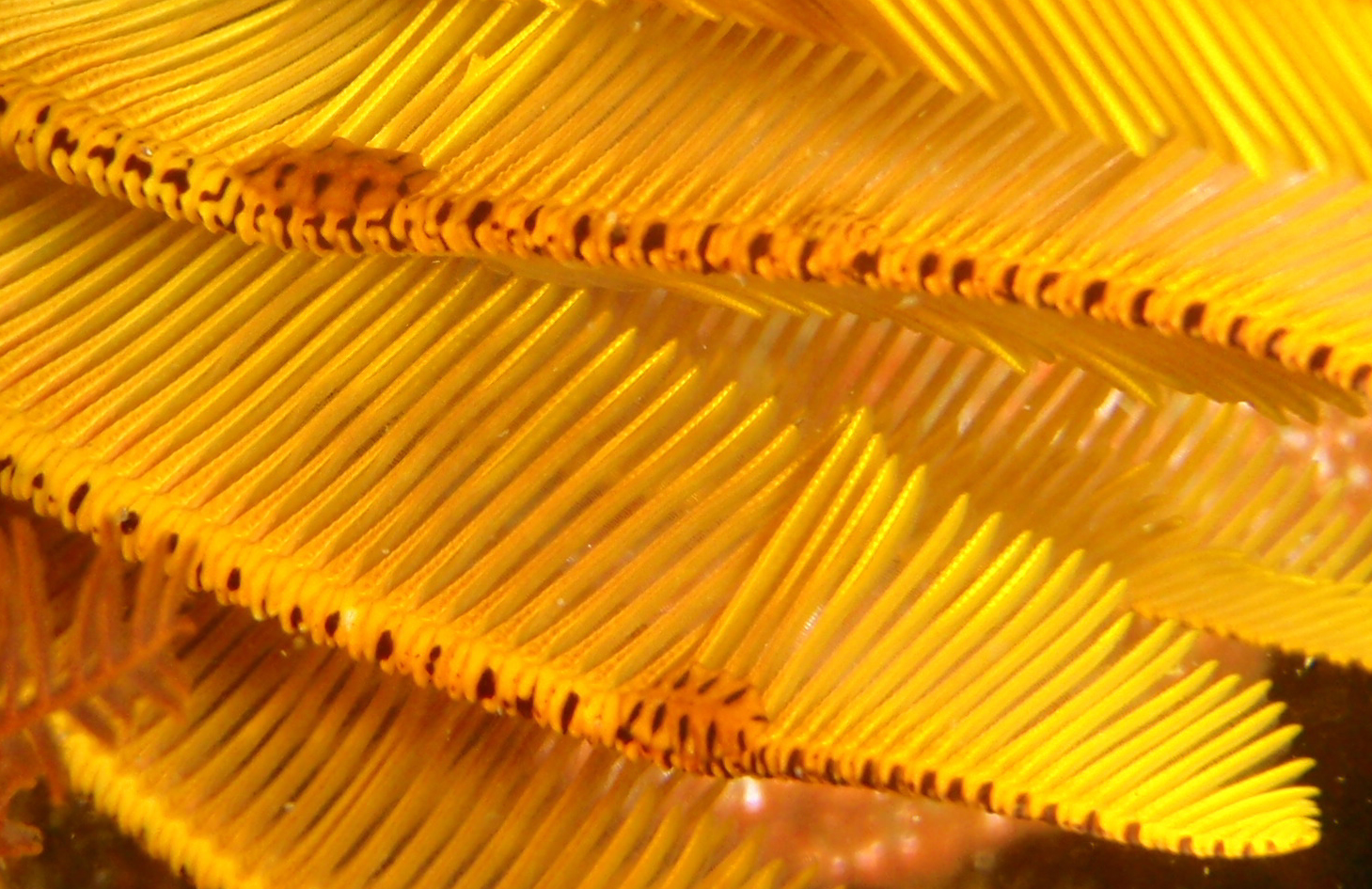
Myzostoma fuscomaculatum on the arms of T. carinata

Elegant feather stars are usually found singly on shallow reefs and are more abundant on deeper reefs. If displaced they may swim using their arms. Commensal organisms such as the myzostomid worm Myzostoma fuscomaculatum and the crinoid shrimp Hippolyte catagrapha are found on the specimens found in False Bay.
