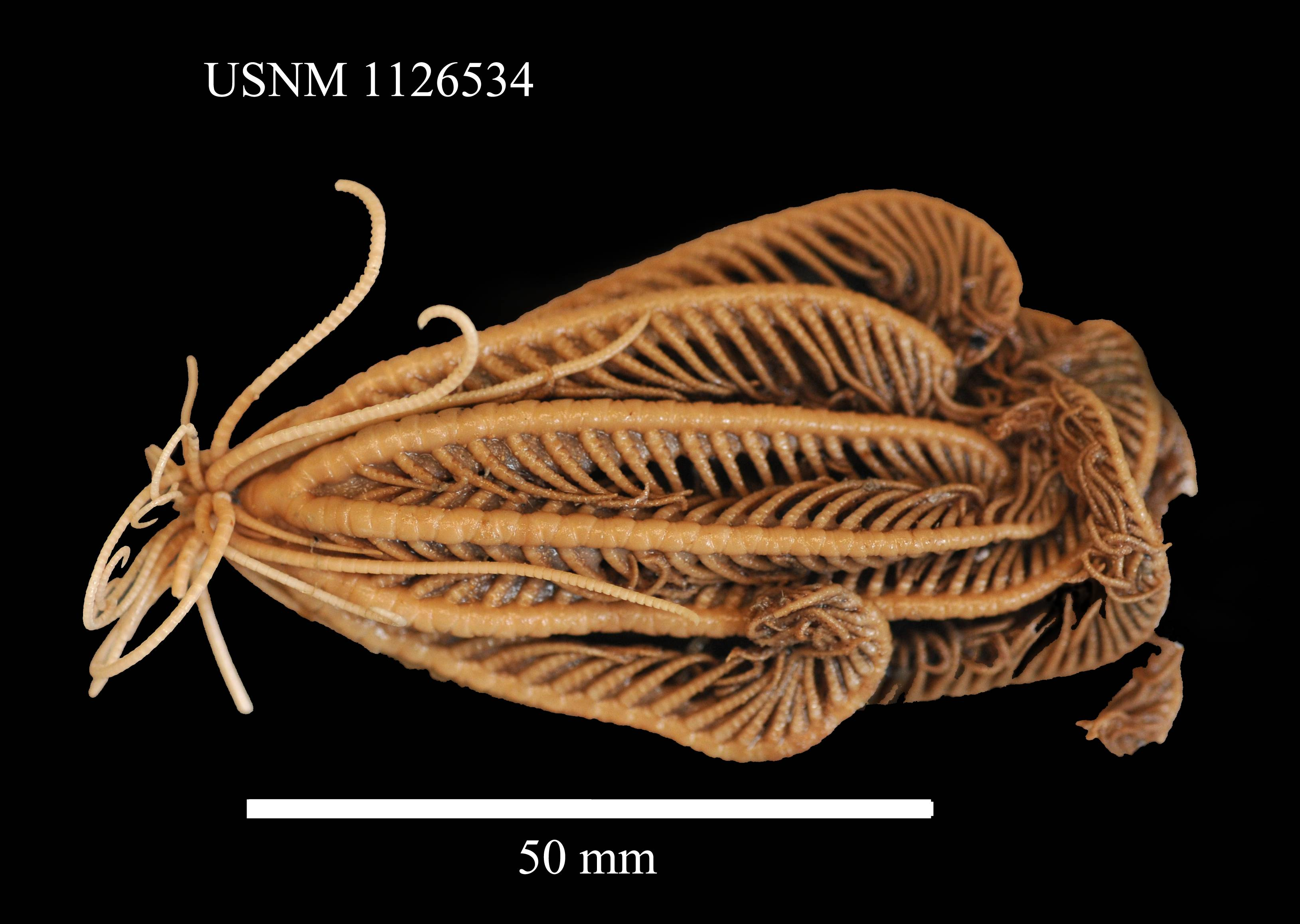
- Notocrinus virilis

Scientific classification
- Kingdom: Animalia
- Phylum: Echinodermata
- Class: Crinoidea
- Superorder: Articulata
- Order: Comatulida
- Superfamily: Notocrinoidea
- Family: Notocrinidae
- Genus: Notocrinus; Mortensen, 1917

Species
- See text

= Notocrinus =

Genus of crinoids

Notocrinus is a genus of crinoids, which contains two species, both endemic to the seas around Antarctica.

== Description ==
Members of this genus have five arms which subdivide near the base giving them ten arms in total. The arms can reach 100 mm (4 in) in length, and there are thirty to sixty or more cirri. The gonads are located on the arms, and the embryos are brooded in cavities in the arms. The aboral surface (underside) of the disc has five deep radial pits arranged in a star-shape.

== Species ==
The World Register of Marine Species lists the following species in this genus:

- Notocrinus messingi Pertossi & Martinez, 2026
- Notocrinus mortenseni John, 1938
- Notocrinus virilis Mortensen, 1917
