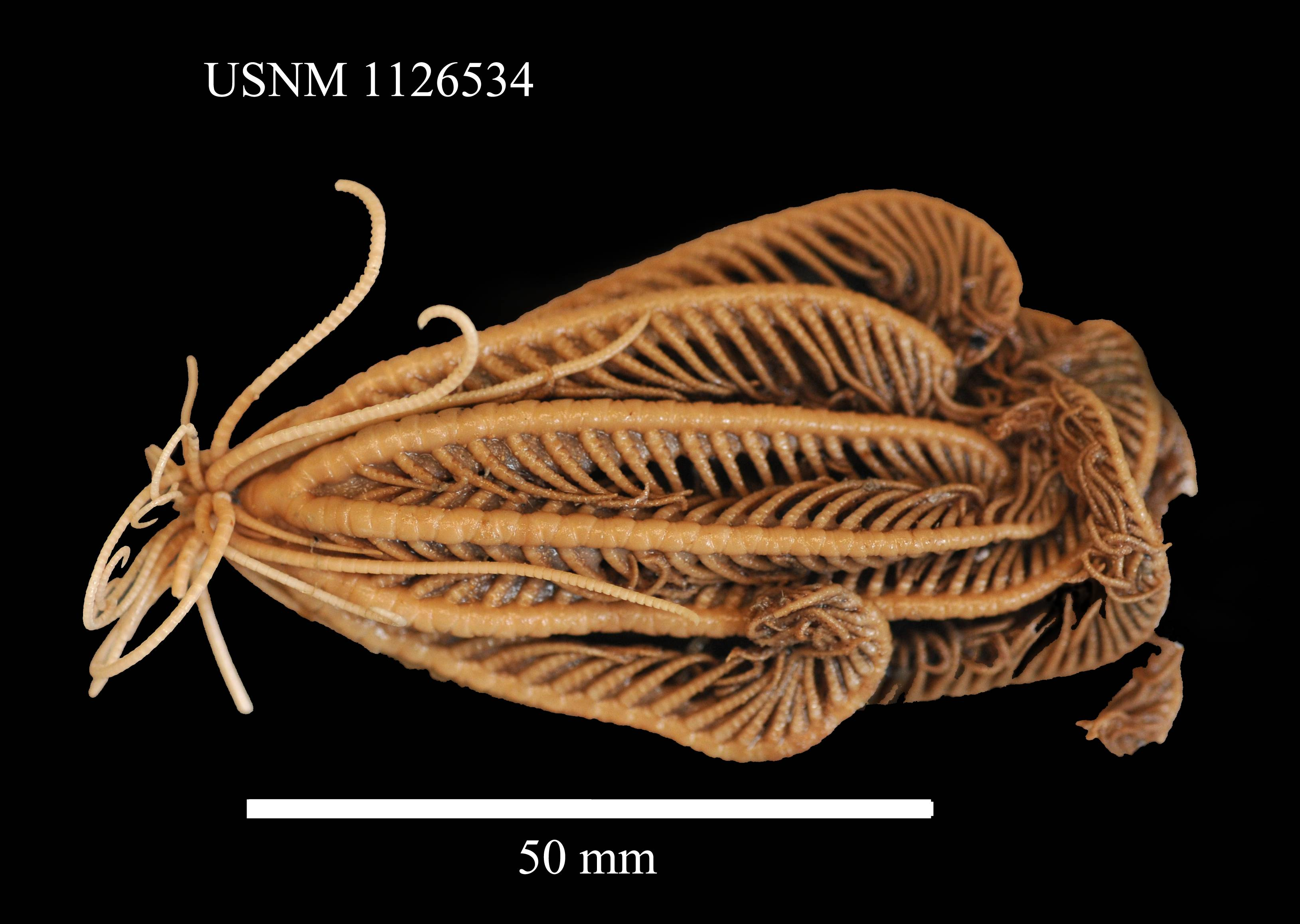
- Notocrinus virilis

Scientific classification
- Kingdom: Animalia
- Phylum: Echinodermata
- Class: Crinoidea
- Superorder: Articulata
- Order: Comatulida
- Superfamily: Notocrinoidea
- Family: Notocrinidae; Mortensen, 1918

Genus
- See text

= Notocrinidae =

Family of crinoids

Notocrinidae is a family of crinoids. It includes one extant genus, Notocrinus, which contains two species, both endemic to the seas around Antarctica. and Zelandimetra, a fossil taxon from the Late Oligocene found in New Zealand.

== Description ==
Members of this family have five arms which subdivide near the base giving them ten arms in total. The arms can reach 100 mm (4 in) in length, and there are thirty to sixty or more cirri. The gonads are located on the arms, and the embryos are brooded in cavities in the arms. The aboral surface (underside) of the disc has five deep radial pits arranged in a star-shape.

== Genera ==
- Notocrinus Mortensen, 1917
- Zelandimetra Eagle, 2008
