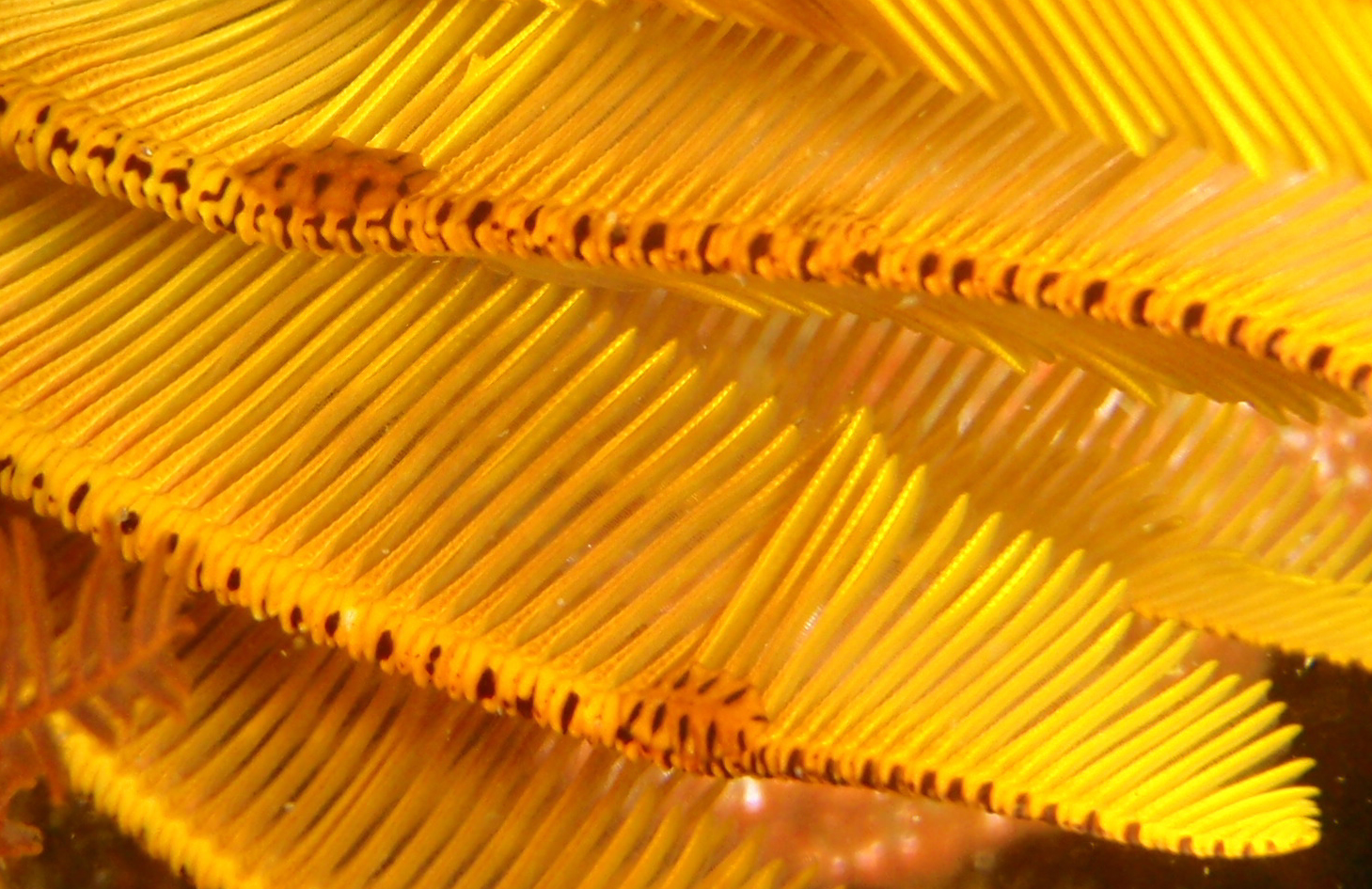
- Myzostoma fuscomaculatum on its host the crinoid Tropiometra carinata

Scientific classification
- Kingdom: Animalia
- Phylum: Annelida
- Clade: Pleistoannelida
- Order: Myzostomida von Graff, 1877

= Myzostomida =

Order of annelid worms

The Myzostomida or Myzostomatida are an order of small marine worms, which are parasitic on echinoderms, mostly crinoids. These highly unusual and diverse annelids were first discovered by Friedrich Sigismund Leuckart in 1827.

== Morphology ==
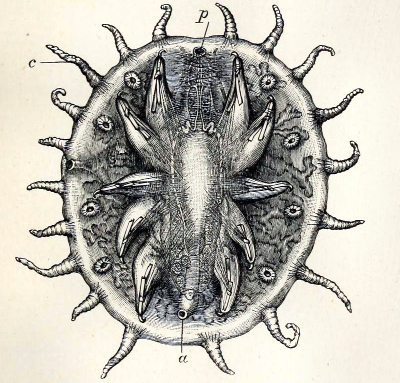
Myzostoma anatomy, showing cirri (c); the pharynx (p), and anus (a)

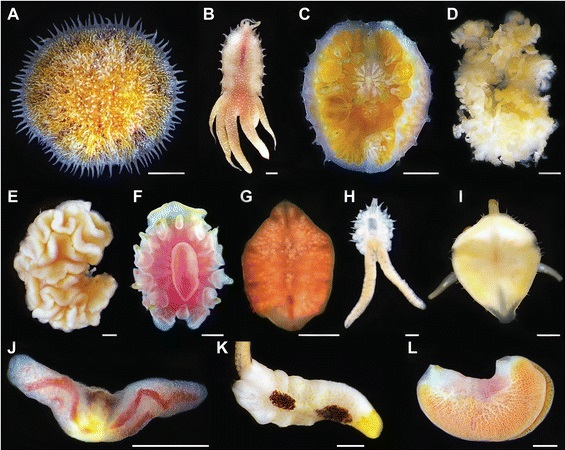
Diversity of myzostomid body shapes

A typical myzostomid has a flattened, rounded shape, with a thin edge drawn out into delicate radiating hairs called cirri. The dorsal surface is smooth, with five pairs of parapodia on the bottom surface. These parapodia are armed with supporting and hooked setae, by means of which the worm adheres to its host. Beyond the parapodia are four pairs of organs, often called suckers. These organs are probably of sensory nature, and are comparable to the lateral sense organs of capitellids. The mouth and cloacal opening are generally at opposite ends of the bottom surface. The former leads to a protrusible pharynx, from which the esophagus opens into a wide intestinal chamber with branching lateral diverticula. There appears to be no vascular system. The nervous system consists of a circumoesophageal nerve, with scarcely differentiated brain, joining below a large ganglionic mass, no doubt representing many fused ganglia. The dorsoventral and the parapodial muscles are much developed, while the coelom is reduced mostly to branched spaces in which the genital products ripen.

Full-grown myzostomids are hermaphrodites. Their internal organs consist of a branched sac opening to the exterior or each side. The paired ovaries discharge their eggs into a median chamber with side branches, often called the uterus, from which the ripe ova (eggs) are discharged by a mediar dorsal pore into the end of the rectum.

== Biology ==
Some species, such as Myzostoma cirriferum, move about on the host; others, such as Myzostoma glabrum, remain stationary with the pharynx inserted in the mouth of the crinoid. Myzostoma deformator gives rise to a gall on the arm of the host, one joint of the pinnule growing round the worm so as to enclose it in a cyst while Myzostoma pulvinar lives in the alimentary canal of a species of Antedon.

Fridtjof Nansen wrote in 1885 the thesis Bidrag til myzostomernes anatomi og histologi on the Myzostomida.

== Classification ==
In the past Myzostomida have been regarded as close relatives of the trematode flatworms or of the tardigrades, but in 1998 it was suggested that they are a sub-group of polychaetes. However, another analysis in 2002 suggested that myzostomids are more closely related to flatworms or to rotifers and acanthocephales. They are now thought to be annelids, while their relationship to other annelids is unclear.

According to the World Register of Marine Species, these families and genera are accepted in this group:

- Asteriomyzostomidae Jägersten, 1940
  - Asteriomyzostomum Jägersten, 1940
- Asteromyzostomidae Wagin, 1954
  - Asteromyzostomum Wagin, 1954
- Eenymeenymyzostomatidae Summers & Rouse, 2015
  - Eenymeenymyzostoma Summers & Rouse, 2015
- Endomyzostomatidae Perrier, 1897
  - Endomyzostoma Perrier, 1897
  - Mycomyzostoma Eeckhaut, 1998
- Myzostomatidae Benham, 1896
  - Cystimyzostomum Jagersten, 1940
  - Hypomyzostoma Perrier, 1897
  - Mesomyzostoma Remscheid, 1918
  - Myzostoma Leuckart, 1836
  - Notopharyngoides
- Protomyzostomidae Stummer-Traunfels, 1926
  - Protomyzostomum Fedotov, 1912
- Pulvinomyzostomidae Jägersten, 1940
  - Pulvinomyzostomum Jägersten, 1940
- Myzostomida incertae sedis
  - Contramyzostoma Eeckhaut, Grygier & Deheyn, 1998
  - Cyclocirra Müller, 1841
  - Stelechopus Graff, 1884
