= Myzostomatidae =

Scientific classification
- Domain: Eukaryota
- Kingdom: Animalia
- Phylum: Annelida
- Class: Polychaeta
- Order: Myzostomida
- Family: Myzostomatidae

Synonyms
- Mesomyzostomatidae; Myzostomidae

Family of polychaetes

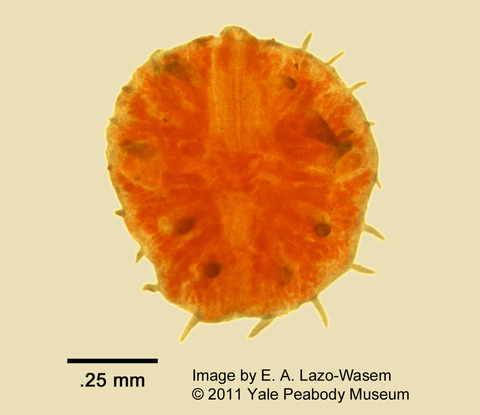
Myzostoma cirriferum

Myzostomatidae is a family of polychaetes belonging to the order Myzostomida.

Genera:

- Cystimyzostomum Jagersten, 1940
- Hypomyzostoma Perrier, 1897
- Mesomyzostoma Remscheid, 1918
- Myzostoma Leuckart, 1836
- Notopharyngoides
