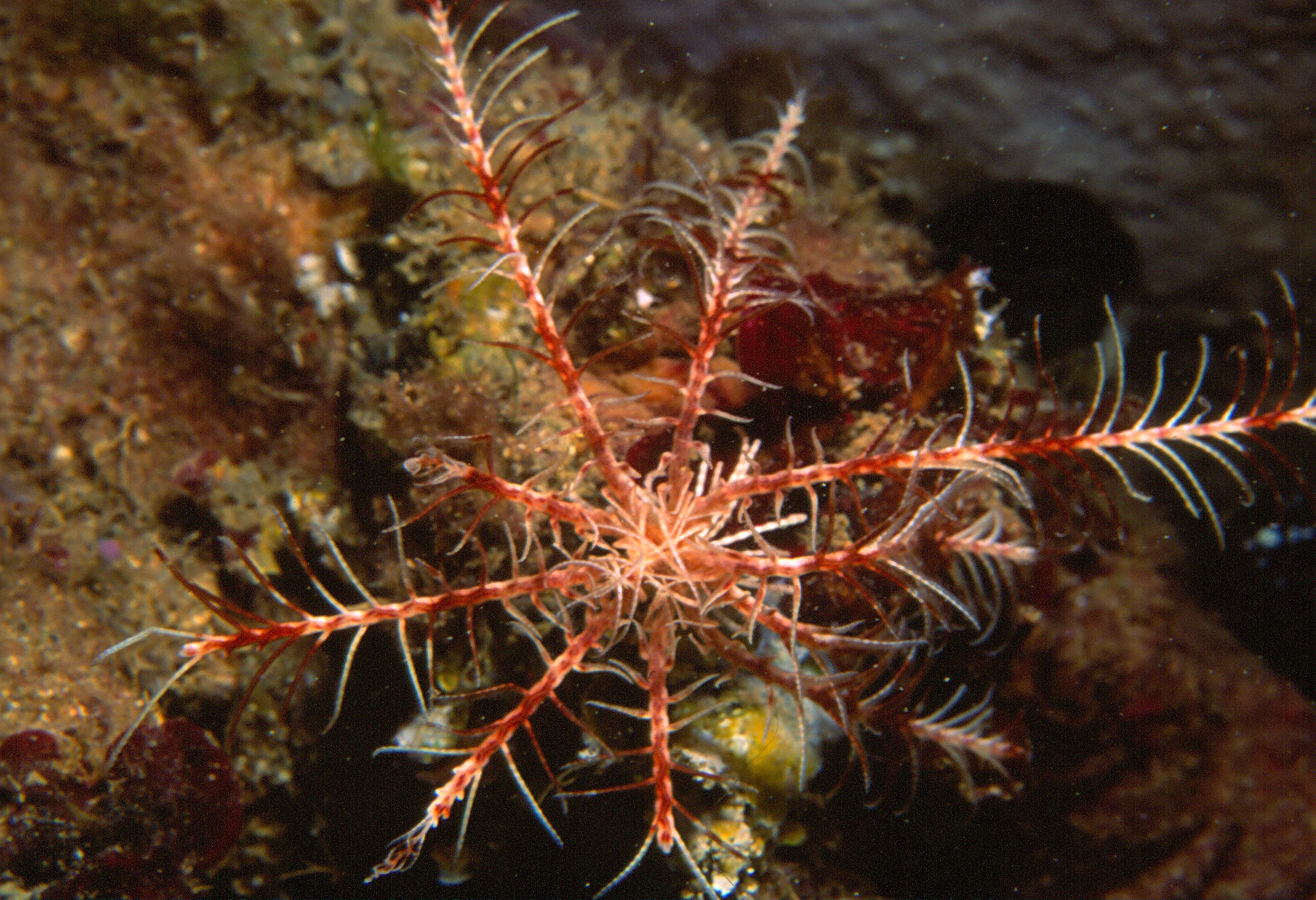
- Antedon mediterranea

Scientific classification
- Kingdom: Animalia
- Phylum: Echinodermata
- Class: Crinoidea
- Order: Comatulida
- Superfamily: Antedonoidea
- Family: Antedonidae; Norman, 1865

Genera
- See text

= Antedonidae =

Family of crinoids

Antedonidae is a family of crinoids or feather stars in the phylum Echinodermata. Members of the family are unstalked and have ten feathery arms. They can move about freely and have clawed cirri to attach them temporarily to structures.

== Genera ==
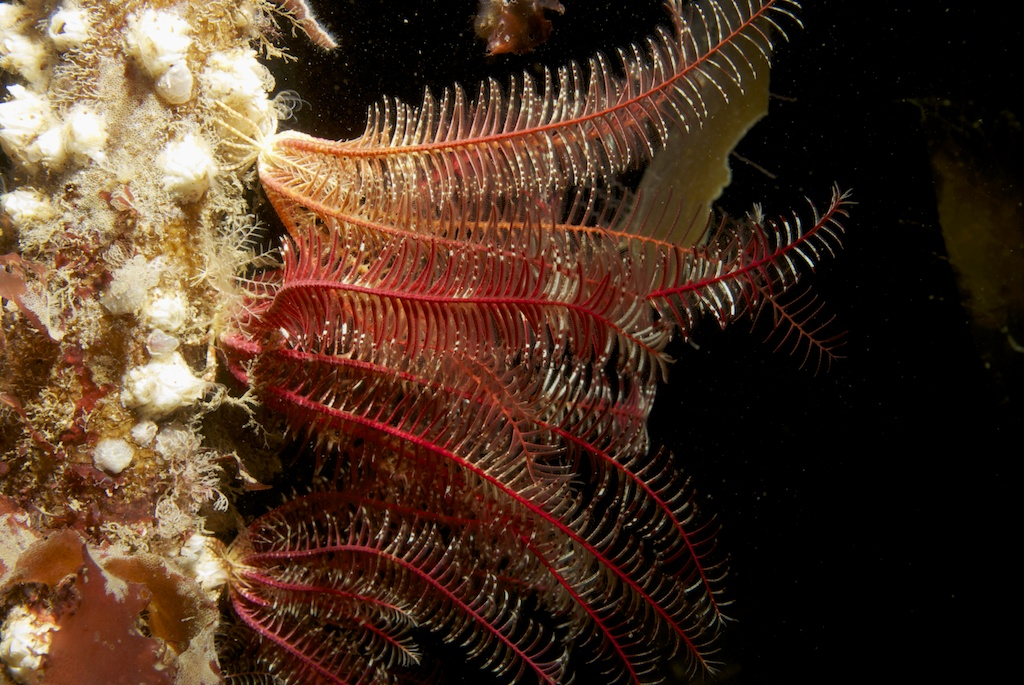
Antedon bifida

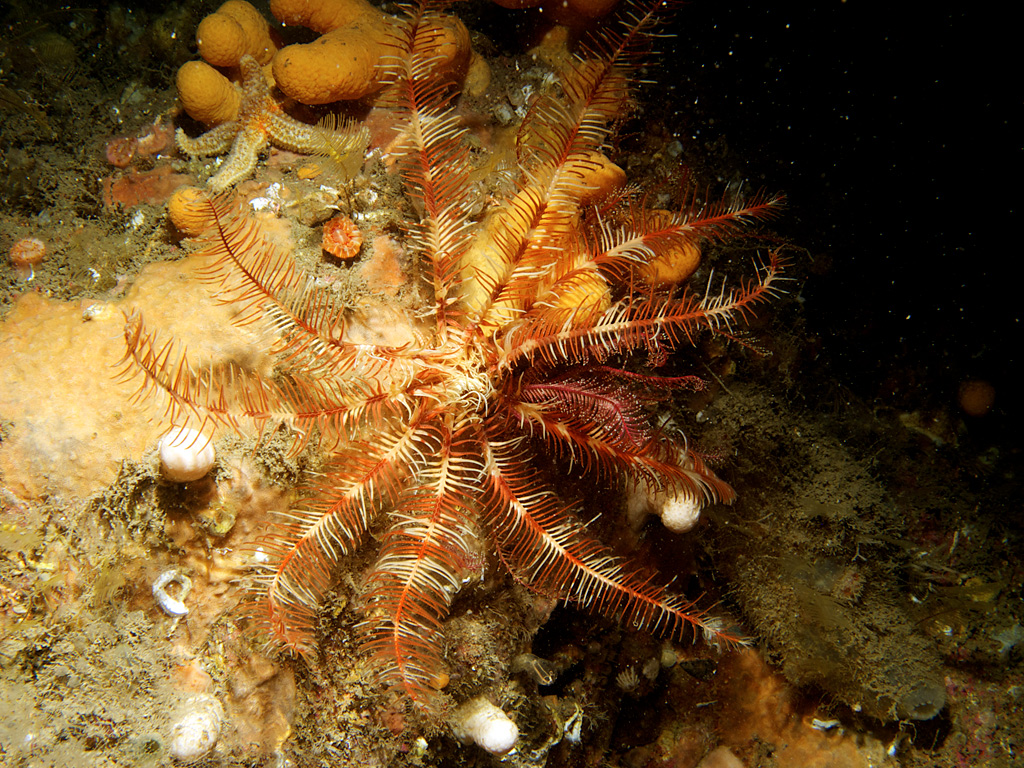
Antedon petasus

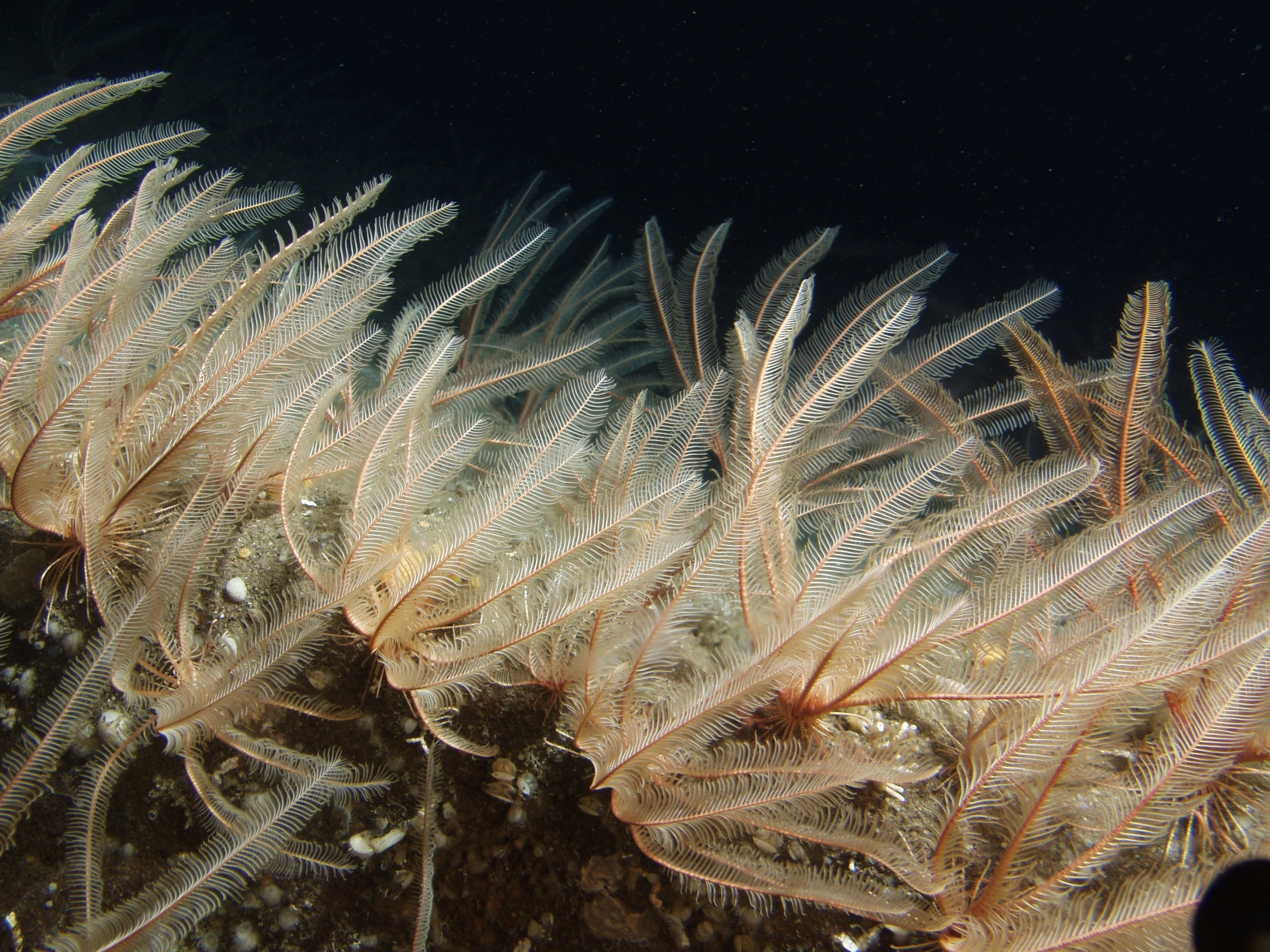
Florometra serratissima

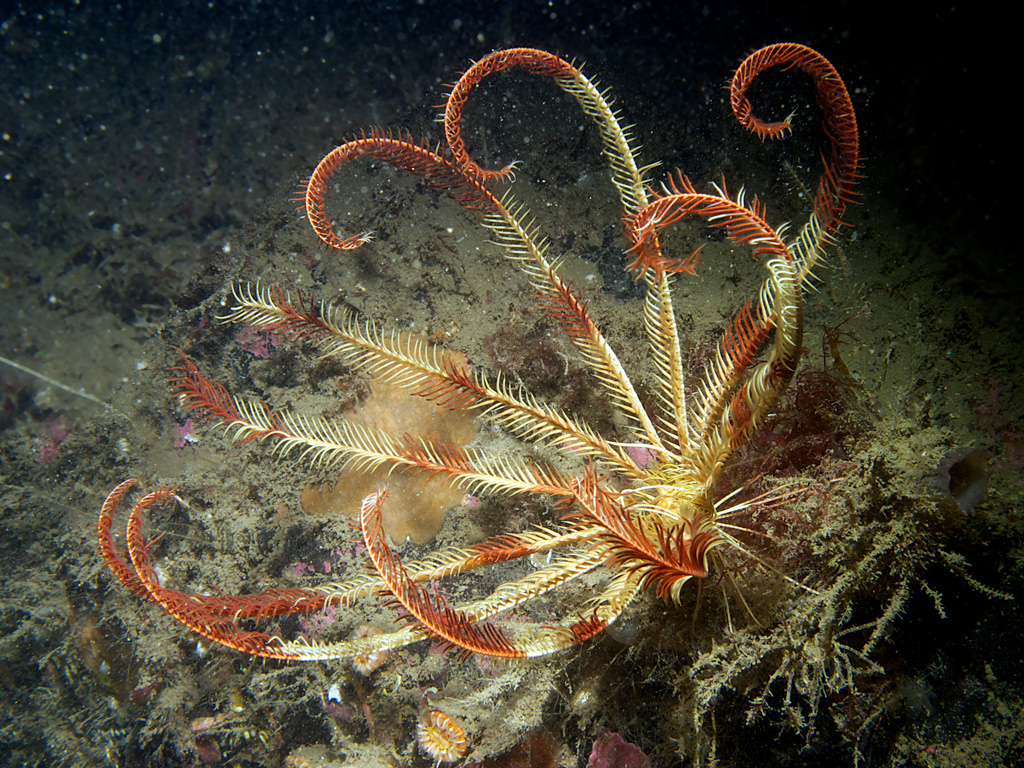
Leptometra celtica

The following genera are recognised by the World Register of Marine Species:

- subfamily Antedoninae (Norman, 1865)
  - genus Andrometra AH Clark, 1917 -- 2 species
  - genus Annametra AH Clark, 1936 -- 2 species
  - genus Antedon de Fréminville, 1811 -- 14 species
  - genus Ctenantedon Meyer, 1972 -- 1 species
  - genus Dorometra Clark, 1917 -- 9 species
  - genus Euantedon AH Clark, 1912 -- 6 species
  - genus Eumetra AH Clark, 1908 -- 1 species
  - genus Iridometra Clark, 1908 -- 3 species
  - genus Mastigometra AH Clark, 1908 -- 3 species
  - genus Toxometra AH Clark, 1911 -- 5 species
- subfamily Bathymetrinae AH Clark, 1909
  - genus Argyrometra AH Clark, 1917 -- 2 species
  - genus Bathymetra AH Clark, 1908 -- 2 species
  - genus Boleometra AH Clark, 1936 -- 1 species
  - genus Fariometra AH Clark, 1917 -- 11 species
  - genus Hathrometra AH Clark, 1908 -- 1 species
  - genus Meteorometra AM Clark, 1980 -- 1 species
  - genus Nepiometra AH Clark, 1917 -- 1 species
  - genus Orthometra AH Clark, 1917 -- 1 species
  - genus Phrixometra Clark, 1921 -- 6 species
  - genus Retiometra AH Clark, 1936 -- 1 species
  - genus Thaumatometra AH Clark, 1908 -- 11 species
  - genus Tonrometra AH Clark, 1917 -- 4 species
  - genus Trichometra AH Clark, 1908 -- 3 species
- subfamily Heliometrinae AH Clark, 1909
  - genus Anthometrina Eleaume, Hess & Messing, 2011 -- 1 species
  - genus Comatonia AH Clark, 1916 -- 1 species
  - genus Florometra AH Clark, 1913 -- 9 species
  - genus Heliometra AH Clark, 1907 -- 1 species
- subfamily Isometrainae Fet & Messing, 2003
  - genus Isometra AH Clark, 1908 -- 7 species
- subfamily Perometrinae AH Clark, 1909
  - genus Erythrometra AH Clark, 1908 -- 3 species
  - genus Helenametra AM Clark, 1966 -- 1 species
  - genus Hypalometra AH Clark, 1908 -- 1 species
  - genus Nanometra AH Clark, 1907 -- 3 species
  - genus Perometra AH Clark, 1907 -- 4 species
- subfamily Thysanometrinae AH Clark, 1909
  - genus Coccometra AH Clark, 1908 -- 3 species
  - genus Thysanometra AH Clark, 1907 -- 2 species
- unassigned
  - genus Adelometra AH Clark, 1907 -- 1 species
  - genus Anisometra John, 1939 -- 1 species
  - genus Athrypsometra Messing & White, 2001 -- 4 species
  - genus Balanometra Clark, 1909 -- 1 species
  - genus Caryometra AH Clark, 1936 -- 6 species
  - genus Cyclometra AH Clark, 1911 -- 2 species
  - genus Eometra Clark, 1936 -- 2 species
  - genus Eumorphometra Clark, 1915 -- 5 species
  - genus Hybometra AH Clark, 1913 -- 1 species
  - genus Kempometra John, 1938 -- 1 species
  - genus Leptometra AH Clark, 1908 -- 2 species
  - genus Microcomatula AH Clark, 1918 -- 1 species
  - genus Poliometra AH Clark, 1923 -- 1 species
  - genus Promachocrinus Carpenter, 1879 -- 5 species
  - genus Solanometra Clark, 1911 -- 1 species
