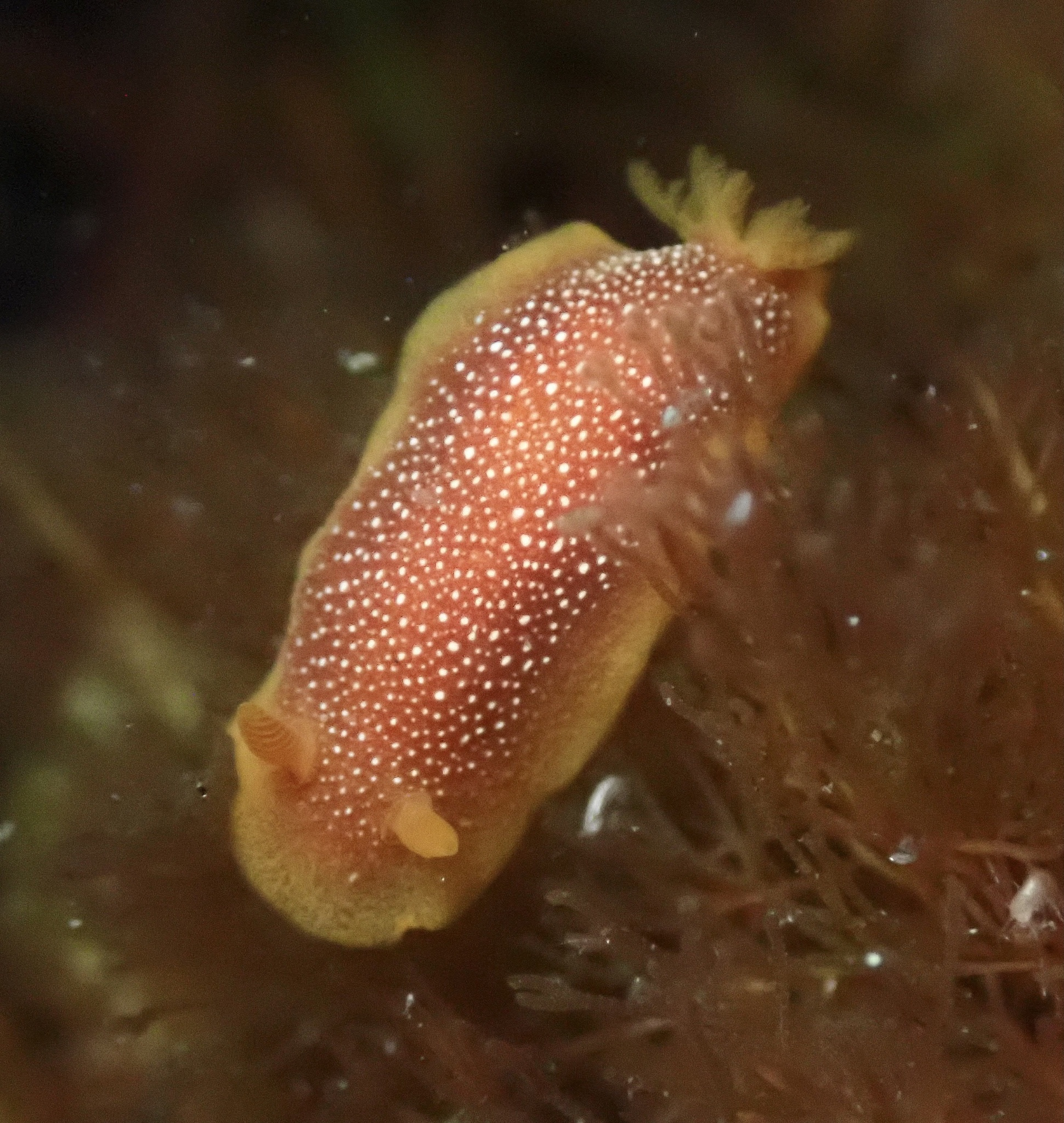

Scientific classification
- Kingdom: Animalia
- Phylum: Mollusca
- Class: Gastropoda
- Order: Nudibranchia
- Family: Dendrodorididae
- Genus: Doriopsilla
- Species: D. gemela

Binomial name
- Doriopsilla gemela Gosliner, Schaefer & Millen, 1999

= Doriopsilla gemela =

Species of gastropod

Doriopsilla gemela is a species of dorid nudibranch, a colourful sea slug, a shell-less marine gastropod mollusk in the family Dendrodorididae.

There are five other species that are quite similar to this species and can be confused with it, and they are: Doriopsilla albopunctata (Cooper, 1863), Doriopsilla bertschi Hoover, Lindsay, Goddard & Valdés, 2015, Doriopsilla davebehrensi Hoover, Lindsay, Goddard & Valdés, 2015, Doriopsilla fulva (MacFarland, 1905) and Baptodoris mimetica Gosliner, 1991.

== Distribution ==
This species was described from the intertidal zone, Hill Street, San Diego, California.

== Description ==
This nudibranch can grow as large as 25 mm. It can be dark yellow to orange in colour, but always with very small opaque white dots. Larger dots are found on the tubercles, with numerous small white dots scattered between the tubercles. The rhinophores are orange-yellow in colour with 9 lamellae on the club. The gills are dark yellow to orange.

== Life habits ==
Doriopsilla gemela eats a sponge.
