= Doriopsilla davebehrensi =

Scientific classification
- Kingdom: Animalia
- Phylum: Mollusca
- Class: Gastropoda
- Order: Nudibranchia
- Family: Dendrodorididae
- Genus: Doriopsilla
- Species: D. davebehrensi

Binomial name
- Doriopsilla davebehrensi Hoover, Lindsay, Goddard & Valdés, 2015

Species of gastropod

Doriopsilla davebehrensi is a species of dorid nudibranch, a colourful sea slug, a shell-less marine gastropod mollusc in the family Dendrodorididae.

There are five other species that are quite similar to this species and can be confused with it, and they are: Doriopsilla albopunctata (Cooper, 1863), Doriopsilla bertschi Hoover, Lindsay, Goddard & Valdés, 2015, Doriopsilla fulva (MacFarland, 1905), Doriopsilla gemela Gosliner, Schaefer & Millen, 1999 and Baptodoris mimetica Gosliner, 1991.

== Distribution ==
This species was described from Bahía de los Ángeles, Baja California, Mexico. A specimen was also found at Newport Bay, California.

== Description ==
This nudibranch can grow as large as 32 mm. It can be dark yellow or orange in colour, but always with very small opaque white dots. The dots are mostly in circles around the tubercles, occasionally on a tubercle. The rhinophores on the head end are orange-yellow in color, and the gills (the rosette at the back) are pale yellow.

== Life habits ==
Doriopsilla albopunctata eats a sponge.
