= Doriopsilla bertschi =

Scientific classification
- Kingdom: Animalia
- Phylum: Mollusca
- Class: Gastropoda
- Order: Nudibranchia
- Family: Dendrodorididae
- Genus: Doriopsilla
- Species: D. bertschi

Binomial name
- Doriopsilla bertschi Hoover, Lindsay, Goddard & Valdés, 2015

Species of gastropod

Doriopsilla bertschi is a species of dorid nudibranch, a colourful sea slug, a shell-less marine gastropod mollusc in the family Dendrodorididae.

There are five other species that are quite similar to this species and can be confused with it, and they are: Doriopsilla albopunctata (Cooper, 1863), Doriopsilla davebehrensi Hoover, Lindsay, Goddard & Valdés, 2015, Doriopsilla fulva (MacFarland, 1905), Doriopsilla gemela Gosliner, Schaefer & Millen, 1999 and Baptodoris mimetica Gosliner, 1991.

== Distribution ==
This species was described from Bahía de los Ángeles, Baja California, Mexico.

== Description ==
This nudibranch can grow as large as 22 mm. It can be dark yellow or orange in colour, but always with very small opaque white dots. The dots are scattered irregularly and are similar in size when on the minute tubercles or between them. The rhinophores are dark yellow to orange in colour, and the gills are very large and also dark yellow to orange in colour.
