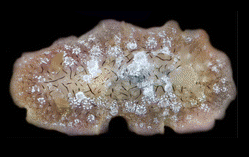
- A live Doriopsilla nigrolineata

Scientific classification
- Kingdom: Animalia
- Phylum: Mollusca
- Class: Gastropoda
- Order: Nudibranchia
- Family: Dendrodorididae
- Genus: Doriopsilla
- Species: D. nigrolineata

Binomial name
- Doriopsilla nigrolineata Meyer, 1977

Synonyms
- Doriopsilla areolata nigrolineata Meyer, 1977

= Doriopsilla nigrolineata =

Species of gastropod

Dendrodoris krebsii is a species of sea slug, a dorid nudibranch, a marine gastropod mollusc in the family Dendrodorididae.

== Taxonomy ==
It was previously considered a subspecies of Doriopsilla areolata Bergh, 1880 by Valdés & Ortea (1997), but Valdés & Hamann (2008) confirmed that it is a distinct species.

== Distribution ==
Distribution of Doriopsilla nigrolineata includes Panama and Honduras.

== Description ==
The shape of the body is oval to elongate. Dorsum is rigid and covered with rounded tubercles. Background color is translucent white to orange, with a series of irregular black lines over the entire dorsum. Bases of tubercles are densely spotted with white. Rhinophores and gill are yellow. The maximum recorded body length is 30 mm.

== Ecology ==
Minimum recorded depth is 3 m. Maximum recorded depth is 12 m. It was found in the depth of 3–6 m of water in Panama.
