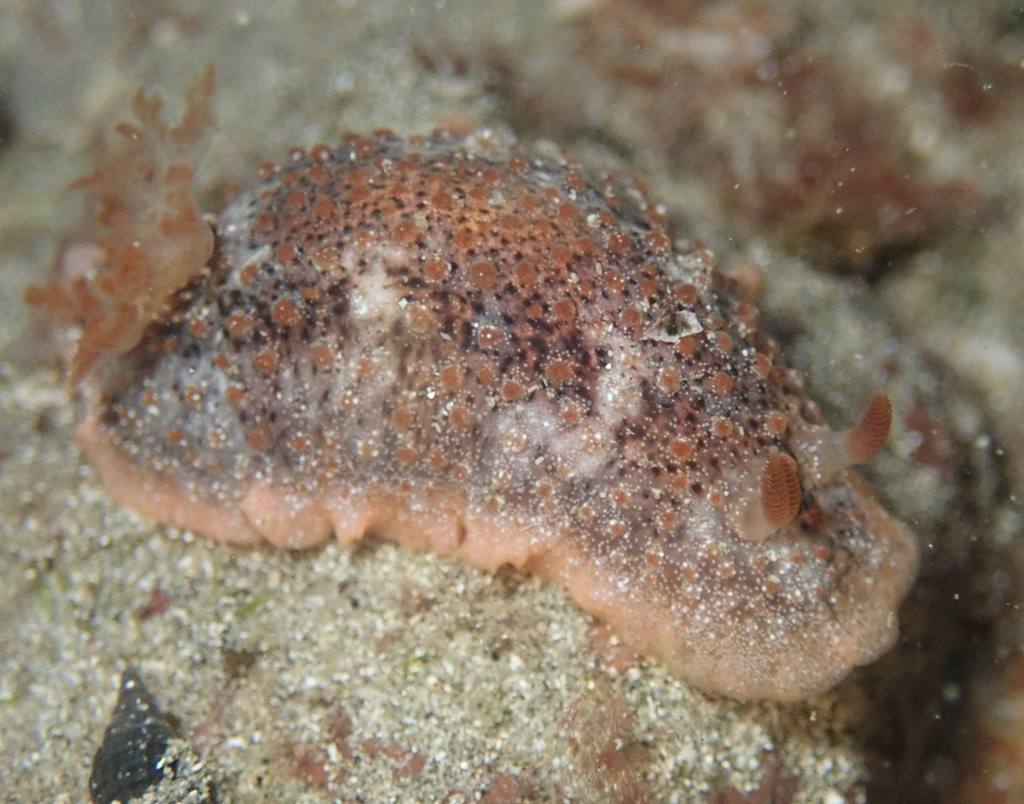

Scientific classification
- Kingdom: Animalia
- Phylum: Mollusca
- Class: Gastropoda
- Order: Nudibranchia
- Family: Dendrodorididae
- Genus: Doriopsilla
- Species: D. janaina

Binomial name
- Doriopsilla janaina Er. Marcus & Ev. Marcus, 1967

= Doriopsilla janaina =

Species of gastropod

Doriopsilla janaina is a species of dorid nudibranch, a colourful sea slug, a shell-less marine gastropod mollusc in the family Dendrodorididae.

== Distribution ==
This species was described from Perico Island, Panama, Pacific Ocean.
