= Doriopsilla tishae =

Scientific classification
- Kingdom: Animalia
- Phylum: Mollusca
- Class: Gastropoda
- Order: Nudibranchia
- Family: Dendrodorididae
- Genus: Doriopsilla
- Species: D. tishae

Binomial name
- Doriopsilla tishae Valdés & Hamann, 2008

Species of gastropod

Doriopsilla tishae is a species of dorid nudibranch, a colourful sea slug, a shell-less marine gastropod mollusc in the family Dendrodorididae.

== Distribution ==
This species was described from Roatán, Honduras, Caribbean Sea with additional specimens from Guanaja, Honduras.
