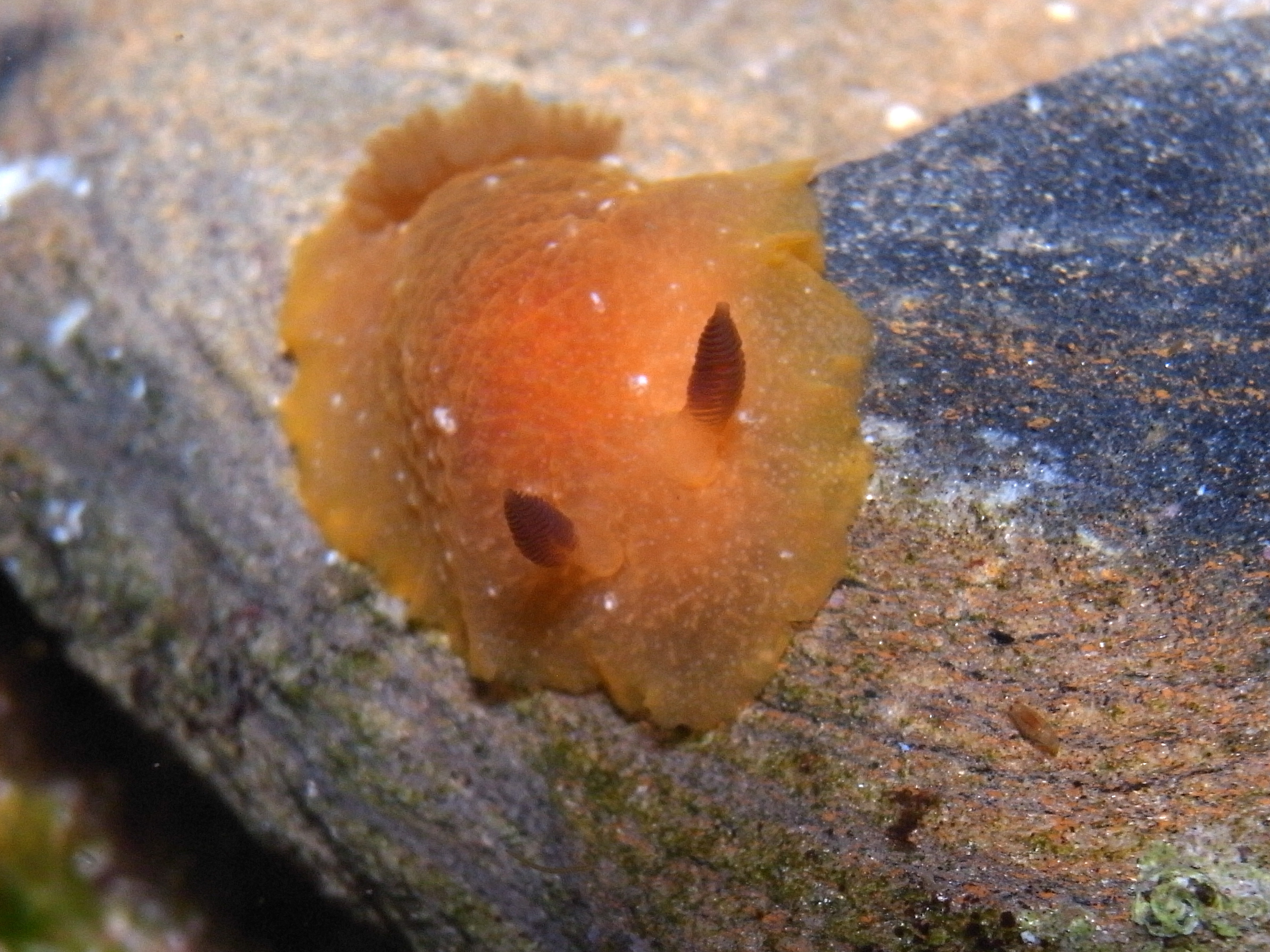

Scientific classification
- Domain: Eukaryota
- Kingdom: Animalia
- Phylum: Mollusca
- Class: Gastropoda
- Order: Nudibranchia
- Superfamily: Phyllidioidea
- Family: Dendrodorididae
- Genus: Doriopsilla
- Species: D. carneola

Binomial name
- Doriopsilla carneola (Angas, 1864)

Synonyms
- Doris carneola Angas, 1864

= Doriopsilla carneola =

Species of gastropod

Doriopsilla carneola is a species of dorid nudibranch, a colourful sea slug, a shell-less marine gastropod mollusc in the family Dendrodorididae.

== Distribution ==
This species was described from a specimen collected at Port Jackson, New South Wales, Australia.

== Description ==
This nudibranch can grow as large as 50 mm. The mantle can vary in colour from translucent white to deep claret, usually with a few white patches or spots. The rhinophores and gills are similar in colour to the mantle.
