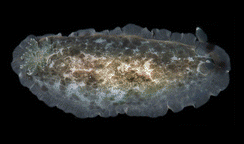
- A live Dendrodoris krebsii

Scientific classification
- Kingdom: Animalia
- Phylum: Mollusca
- Class: Gastropoda
- Order: Nudibranchia
- Family: Dendrodorididae
- Genus: Dendrodoris
- Species: D. krebsii

Binomial name
- Dendrodoris krebsii (Mörch, 1863)

Synonyms

= Dendrodoris krebsii =

Species of gastropod

Dendrodoris krebsii is a species of sea slug, a dorid nudibranch, a marine gastropod mollusc in the family Dendrodorididae.

== Distribution ==
Distribution of Dendrodoris krebsii includes North and south American mainland from Georgia to Rio de Janeiro in southeastern Brazil. It was also found in Bahamas, Cuba, Cayman Islands, Jamaica, Dominican Republic, Virgin Islands, St. Martin, Antigua, Guadeloupe, Martinique, St. Lucia, St. Vincent and the Grenadines, Barbados, Aruba, Curaçao, Bonaire, Grenada and Panama.

== Description ==
The shape of the body is oval to elongate. The dorsum is soft and without tubercles. Background color is extremely variable, white, black, orange, red or light green, with or without spots of red, black, gray or white. Rhinophores and gill are usually the same color as the rest of the body with white tips. The maximum recorded body length is 120 mm or up to 150 mm.

Color variability of Dendrodoris krebsii:

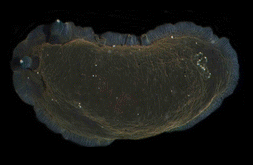
A black specimen.

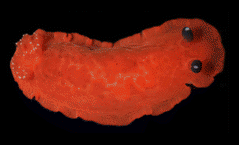
A red specimen.

== Ecology ==
Dendrodoris krebsii was found under coral rubble or rocks in Panama. Minimum recorded depth is 0 m. Maximum recorded depth is 25 m. This is one of the most common species of Nudibranchia in the Caribbean.

Members of this family are suctorial sponge feeders. Prey of Dendrodoris krebsii include sponge Haliclona sp.
