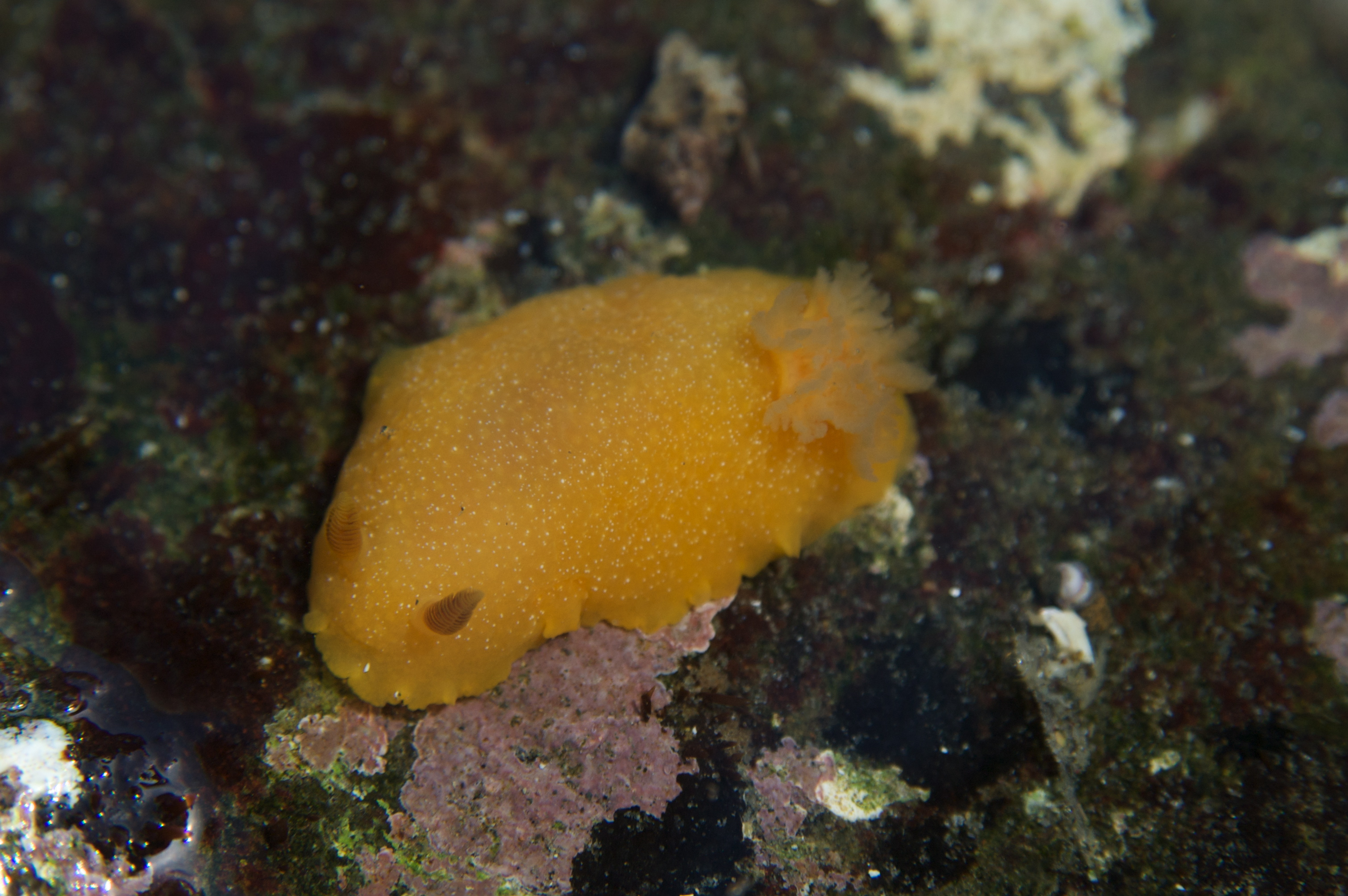

Scientific classification
- Domain: Eukaryota
- Kingdom: Animalia
- Phylum: Mollusca
- Class: Gastropoda
- Order: Nudibranchia
- Superfamily: Phyllidioidea
- Family: Dendrodorididae
- Genus: Doriopsilla
- Species: D. albopunctata

Binomial name
- Doriopsilla albopunctata (Cooper, 1863)

= Doriopsilla albopunctata =

Species of gastropod

Doriopsilla albopunctata, the white-spotted sea goddess, is a species of dorid nudibranch, a colorful sea slug, in the family Dendrodorididae. It is native to the Pacific Coast of North America, from Mendocino County, California south, possibly to Baja California Peninsula, Mexico.

There are five other species that are quite similar to Doriopsilla albopunctata and can be confused with it: Doriopsilla bertschi (Hoover, Lindsay, Goddard & Valdés, 2015), Doriopsilla davebehrensi (Hoover, Lindsay, Goddard & Valdés, 2015), Doriopsilla fulva (MacFarland, 1905), Doriopsilla gemela (Gosliner, Schaefer & Millen, 1999), and Baptodoris mimetica (Gosliner, 1991).

== Distribution ==
This species is found from Mendocino to San Diego, California and possibly on the Pacific coast of Baja California Peninsula, Mexico.

== Description ==
This nudibranch can grow as large as 60 mm (2 1/2 inches). It can be yellow or orange or brown, but always with very small opaque white dots. The dots are on the tips of raised tubercles and in circles around the tubercles. The rhinophores on the head end are yellow or orange-yellow in color, and the gills (the rosette at the back) are white or pale yellow.

== Diet ==
The food of Doriopsilla albopunctata needs to be clarified in the light of newly discovered species and reports may be of related species. It has been reported to eat an orange sponge at Bahía de los Ángeles but this is possibly a reference to Doriopsilla bertschi. It has also been reported to eat Cliona californiana, the yellow boring sponge.
