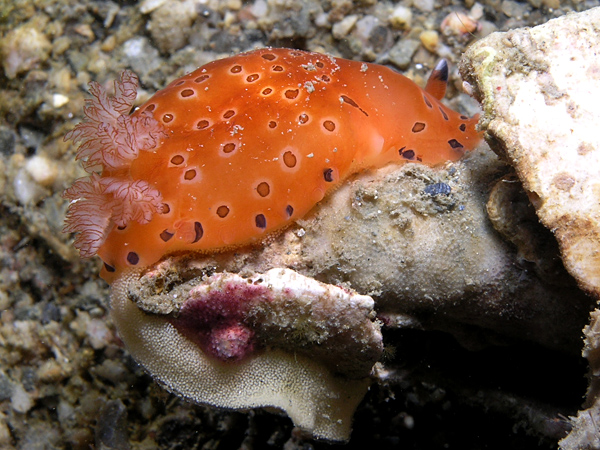
- Dendrodoris guttata laying eggs

Scientific classification
- Kingdom: Animalia
- Phylum: Mollusca
- Class: Gastropoda
- Order: Nudibranchia
- Family: Dendrodorididae
- Genus: Dendrodoris
- Species: D. guttata

Binomial name
- Dendrodoris guttata (Odhner, 1917)

= Dendrodoris guttata =

Species of gastropod

Dendrodoris guttata is a species of sea slug, a dorid nudibranch, a marine gastropod mollusc in the family Dendrodorididae.

== Distribution ==
This species occurs in Australia.
