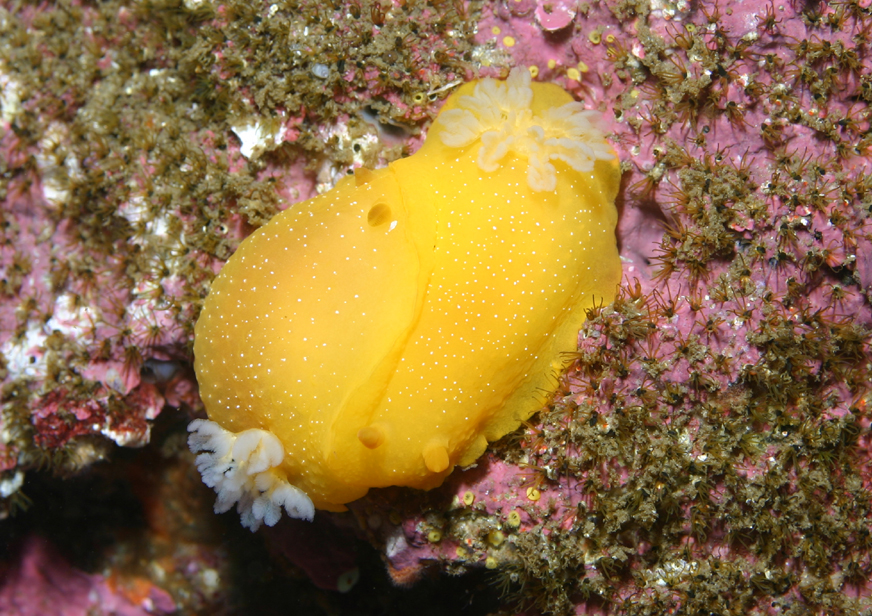
- Doriopsilla albopunctata

Scientific classification
- Kingdom: Animalia
- Phylum: Mollusca
- Class: Gastropoda
- Order: Nudibranchia
- Family: Dendrodorididae
- Genus: Doriopsilla; Bergh, 1880

= Doriopsilla =

Genus of gastropods

Doriopsilla is a genus of sea slugs, dorid nudibranchs, shell-less marine gastropod molluscs in the family Dendrodorididae.

== Description ==
Doriopsilla and Dendrodoris are genera which have frequently been confused, partly because both lack a radula. They feed by dissolving their sponge food externally, using enzymes, and then ingesting sponge cells without the sponge skeleton. They share this loss of the radula and method of feeding with the Phyllidiidae but look more like other Dorid nudibranchs in having a rosette of gills surrounding a dorsal anus, whilst Phyllidiidae have the gills located beneath the edge of the mantle.

== Species ==
Species so far described in this genus include:

- Doriopsilla albopunctata (J.G. Cooper, 1863)
- Doriopsilla areolata (Bergh, 1880)
- Doriopsilla aurea (Quoy & Gaimard, 1832)
- Doriopsilla bertschi Hoover, Lindsay, Goddard & Valdés, 2015
- Doriopsilla capensis Bergh, 1907
- Doriopsilla carneola (Angas, 1864)
- Doriopsilla davebehrensi Hoover, Lindsay, Goddard & Valdés, 2015
- Doriopsilla debruini Perrone, 2001
- Doriopsilla elitae Valdés & Hamann, 2008
- Doriopsilla espinosai Valdés & Ortea, 1998
- Doriopsilla fulva (MacFarland, 1905)
- Doriopsilla gemela Gosliner, Schaefer & Millen, 1999
- Doriopsilla janaina Marcus and Marcus, 1967
- Doriopsilla miniata (Alder and Hancock, 1864)
- Doriopsilla nigrocera Yonow, 2012
- Doriopsilla nigrolineata Meyer, 1977
- Doriopsilla pallida Bergh, 1902
- Doriopsilla peculiaris (Abraham, 1877)
- Doriopsilla pelseneeri Oliviera, 1895
- Doriopsilla pharpa Er. Marcus, 1961
- Doriopsilla rowena Er. Marcus & Ev. Marcus, 1967
- Doriopsilla spaldingi Valdes & Behrens, 1998
- Doriopsilla tishae Valdés & Hamann, 2008

Species brought into synonymy

- Doriopsilla ciminoi Avila, Ballesteros & Ortea, 1992 accepted as Doriopsilla areolata Bergh, 1880
- Doriopsilla fedalae Pruvot-Fol. 1953 : synonym of Doriopsilla areolata Bergh, 1880
- Doriopsilla leia Er. Marcus, 1961: synonym of Doriopsilla pharpa Er. Marcus, 1961
- Doriopsilla nigromaculata (Cockerell in Coc and Eliot, 1905): synonym of Dendrodoris nigromaculata (Cockerell, 1905)
- Doriopsilla pusilla Pruvot-Fol, 1951 accepted as Doriopsilla areolata Bergh, 1880
- Doriopsilla rarispinosa Pruvot-Fol, 1951 accepted as Doriopsilla areolata Bergh, 1880
