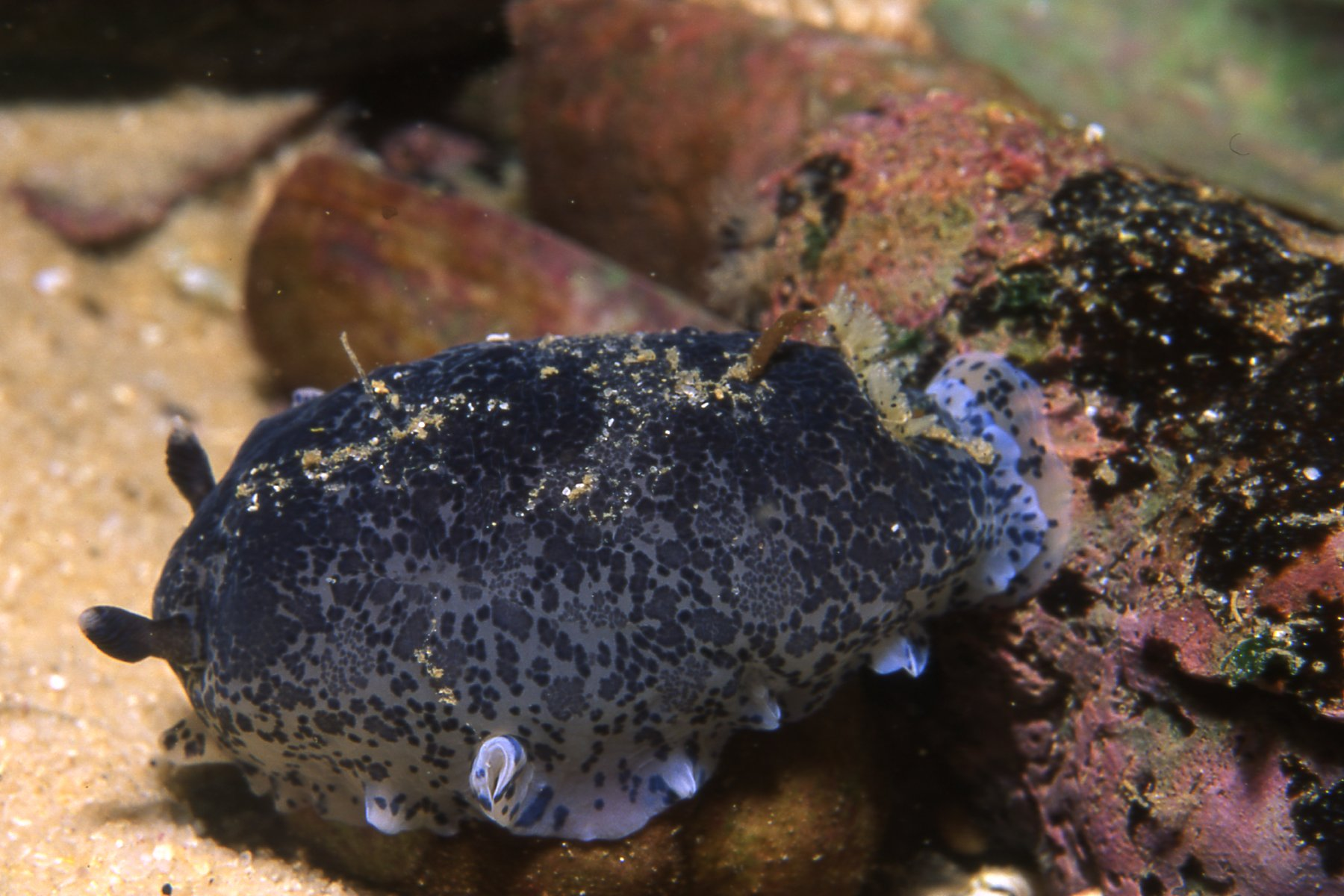

Scientific classification
- Kingdom: Animalia
- Phylum: Mollusca
- Class: Gastropoda
- Order: Nudibranchia
- Family: Dendrodorididae
- Genus: Dendrodoris
- Species: D. caesia

Binomial name
- Dendrodoris caesia (Bergh, 1905)

= Blue-speckled nudibranch =

Species of gastropod

The blue-speckled nudibranch (Dendrodoris caesia) is a species of sea slug, a dorid nudibranch. It is a marine gastropod mollusc in the family Dendrodorididae.

== Distribution ==
This species has so far only been found around the southern African coast from the Cape Peninsula to Port Elizabeth subtidally to at least 20 m. It is probably endemic.

== Description ==
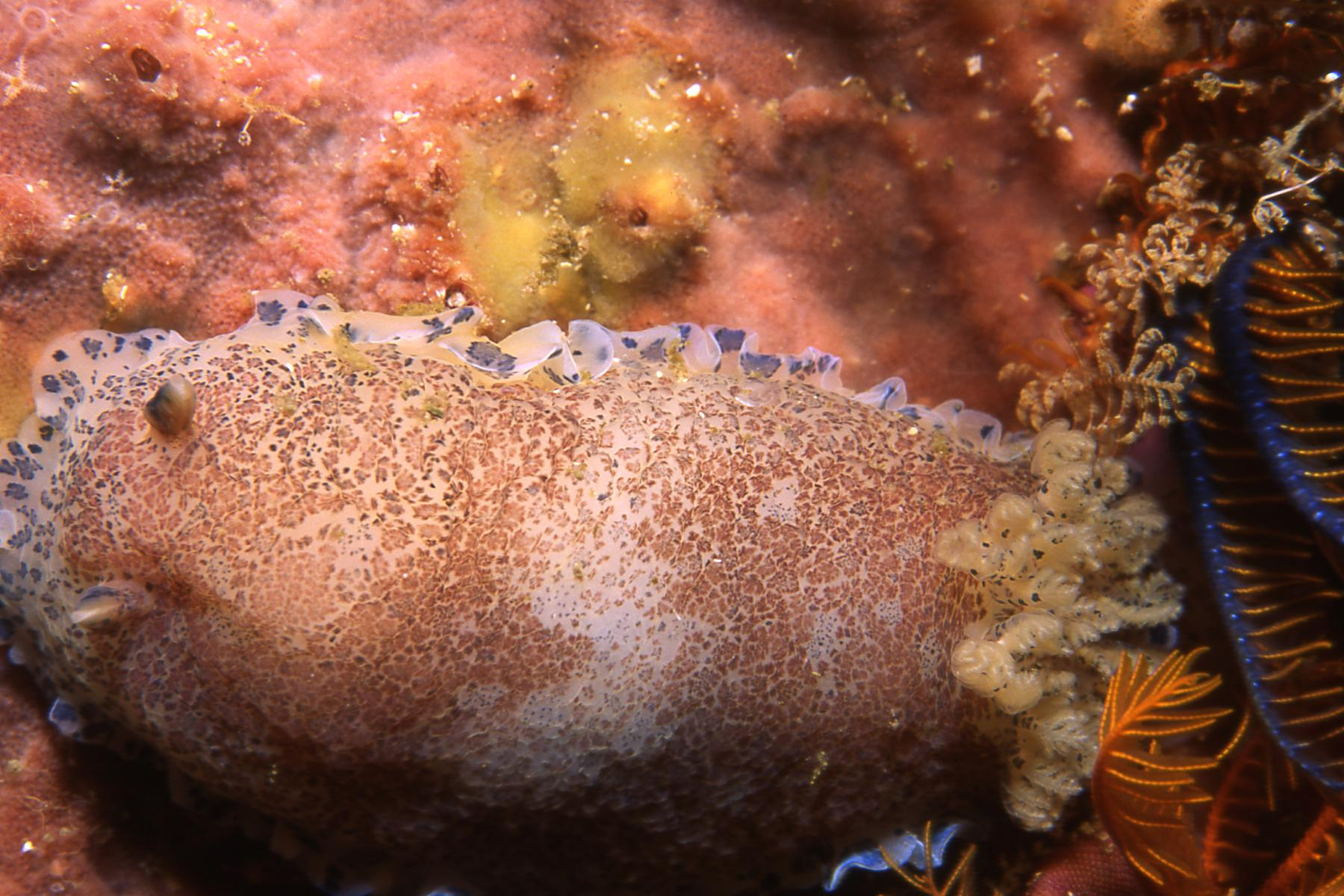
A pink morph of the blue-speckled nudibranch

The blue-speckled nudibranch is a large nudibranch with a frilly margin. The speckles can be almost continuous and in some specimens the animal is pink-speckled. The rhinophores are perfoliate and the gill rosette is large and blue-edged. It may reach a total length of 120 mm.

== Ecology ==
This species feeds on a yellow-brown sponge. The egg mass is a messy ribbon of several whorls.
