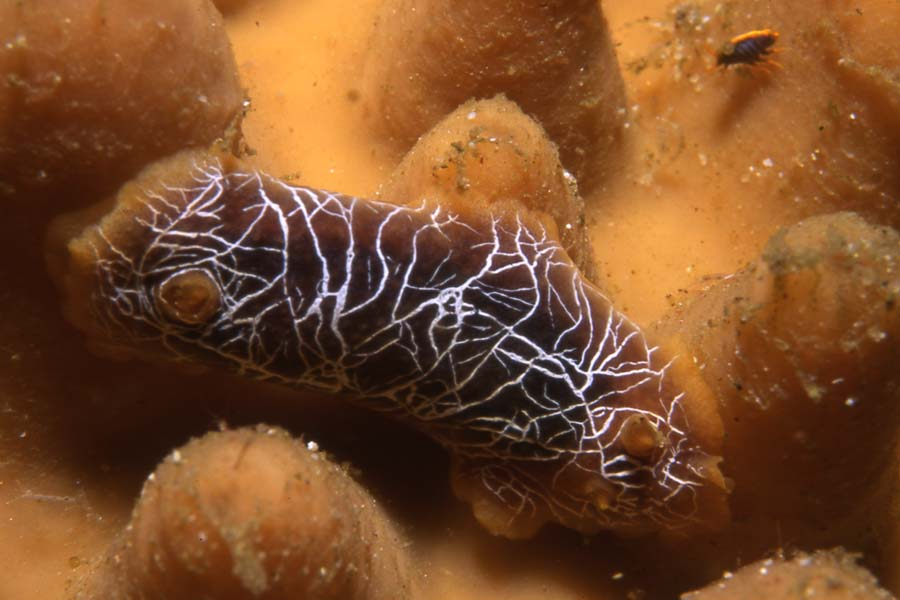

Scientific classification
- Kingdom: Animalia
- Phylum: Mollusca
- Class: Gastropoda
- Order: Nudibranchia
- Family: Dendrodorididae
- Genus: Doriopsilla
- Species: D. miniata

Binomial name
- Doriopsilla miniata (Alder & Hancock, 1864)

Synonyms
- Dendrodoris davisi Allan, 1933; Doridopsis miniata Alder & Hancock, 1864 (basionym)

= Scribbled nudibranch =

Species of gastropod

The scribbled nudibranch (Doriopsilla miniata) is a species of sea slug, a dorid nudibranch. It is a marine gastropod mollusc in the family Dendrodorididae.

== Distribution ==
This species was described from Waltair, India. It is reported from the Indo-Pacific Ocean including Australia. It has been synonymised with the Mediterranean species Doriopsilla areolata in the past. Around the southern African coast it is found from the Atlantic side of the Cape Peninsula to Sodwana Bay, from the intertidal to at least 30 m. In the light of recent discoveries regarding the Doriopsilla species of California it is likely that this is a species complex.

== Description ==
The scribbled nudibranch is a smooth-bodied yellow-brown nudibranch, with opaque white lines on its notum. It may reach a total length of 50 mm.

== Ecology ==
This species feeds on sponges. It lacks a tooth-bearing tongue (radula) and instead digests prey sponges using digestive enzymes produced by its oral gland. The externally digested sponge cells are then pumped into the mouth. Its appearance is mimicked by a sea snail, Trivia millardi.
