= Doriopsilla elitae =

Scientific classification
- Kingdom: Animalia
- Phylum: Mollusca
- Class: Gastropoda
- Order: Nudibranchia
- Family: Dendrodorididae
- Genus: Doriopsilla
- Species: D. elitae

Binomial name
- Doriopsilla elitae Valdés & Hamann, 2008

Species of gastropod

Doriopsilla elitae is a species of dorid nudibranch, a colourful sea slug, a shell-less marine gastropod mollusc in the family Dendrodorididae. This species of sea slug is described as having a yellow to orange color tone decorated with white spots. Located on the dorsal side are four large spots similar to those found on die.

== Distribution ==
This species was described from St. Lucia, Caribbean Sea with additional specimens from Petit Nevis, Saint Vincent and the Grenadines.
