= Doriopsilla debruini =

Scientific classification
- Domain: Eukaryota
- Kingdom: Animalia
- Phylum: Mollusca
- Class: Gastropoda
- Order: Nudibranchia
- Superfamily: Phyllidioidea
- Family: Dendrodorididae
- Genus: Doriopsilla
- Species: D. debruini

Binomial name
- Doriopsilla debruini Perrone, 2001

Species of gastropod

Doriopsilla debruini is a species of dorid nudibranch, a colourful sea slug, a shell-less marine gastropod mollusc in the family Dendrodorididae.

== Distribution ==
This species was described from Hout Bay, South Africa.
