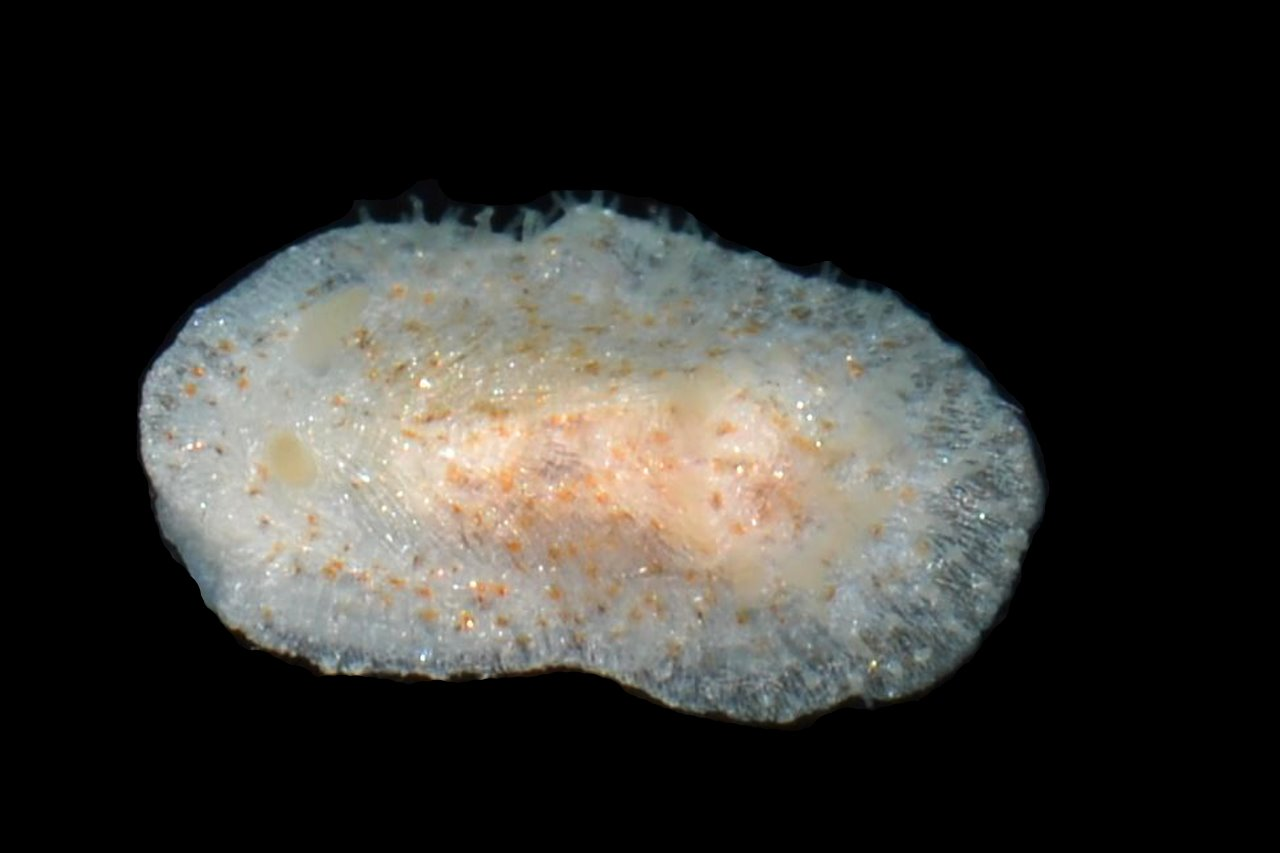

Scientific classification
- Kingdom: Animalia
- Phylum: Mollusca
- Class: Gastropoda
- Order: Nudibranchia
- Family: Dendrodorididae
- Genus: Doriopsilla
- Species: D. espinosai

Binomial name
- Doriopsilla espinosai Valdés & Ortea, 1998

= Doriopsilla espinosai =

Species of gastropod

Doriopsilla espinosai is a species of dorid nudibranch, a colourful sea slug, a shell-less marine gastropod mollusc in the family Dendrodorididae.

== Distribution ==
This species was described from Cuba, Caribbean Sea. It has been reported from the Bahamas.
