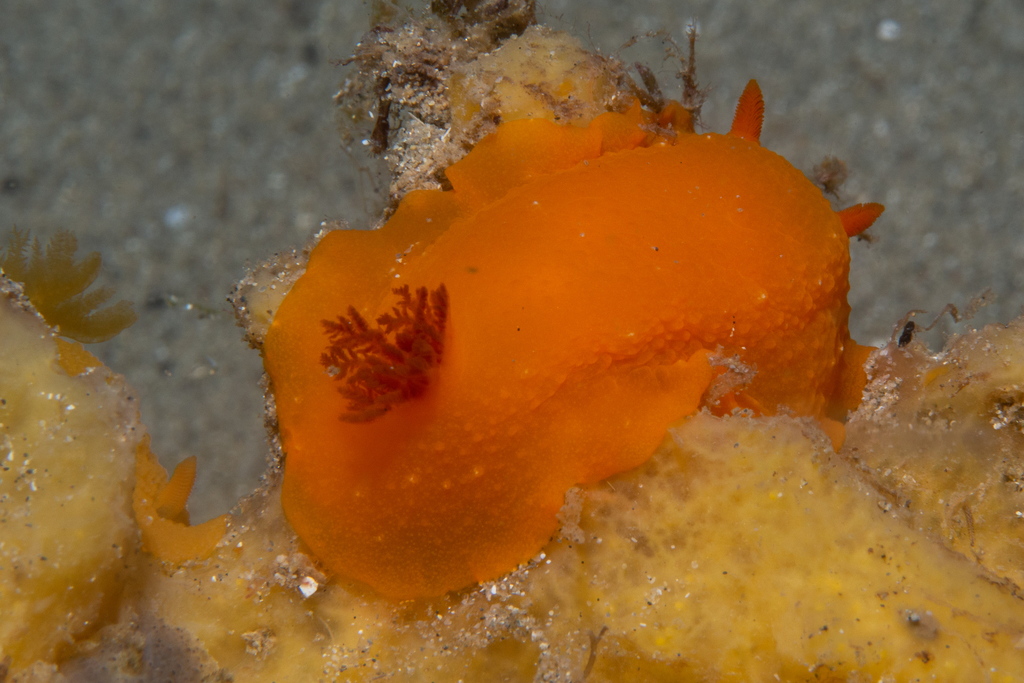

Scientific classification
- Kingdom: Animalia
- Phylum: Mollusca
- Class: Gastropoda
- Order: Nudibranchia
- Family: Dendrodorididae
- Genus: Doriopsilla
- Species: D. aurea

Binomial name
- Doriopsilla aurea (Quoy & Gaimard, 1832)

Synonyms
- Doris aurea Quoy & Gaimard, 1832

= Doriopsilla aurea =

Species of gastropod

Doriopsilla aurea is a species of dorid nudibranch, a colourful sea slug, a shell-less marine gastropod mollusc in the family Dendrodorididae.

== Distribution ==
This species was described from Jervis Bay, New South Wales, Australia.

== Description ==
This nudibranch can grow as large as 20 mm. The mantle can vary in colour from translucent white to deep orange, with a regular pattern of white raised pustules. The rhinophores are pale yellow to orange in colour, and the gills are also yellow to orange.
