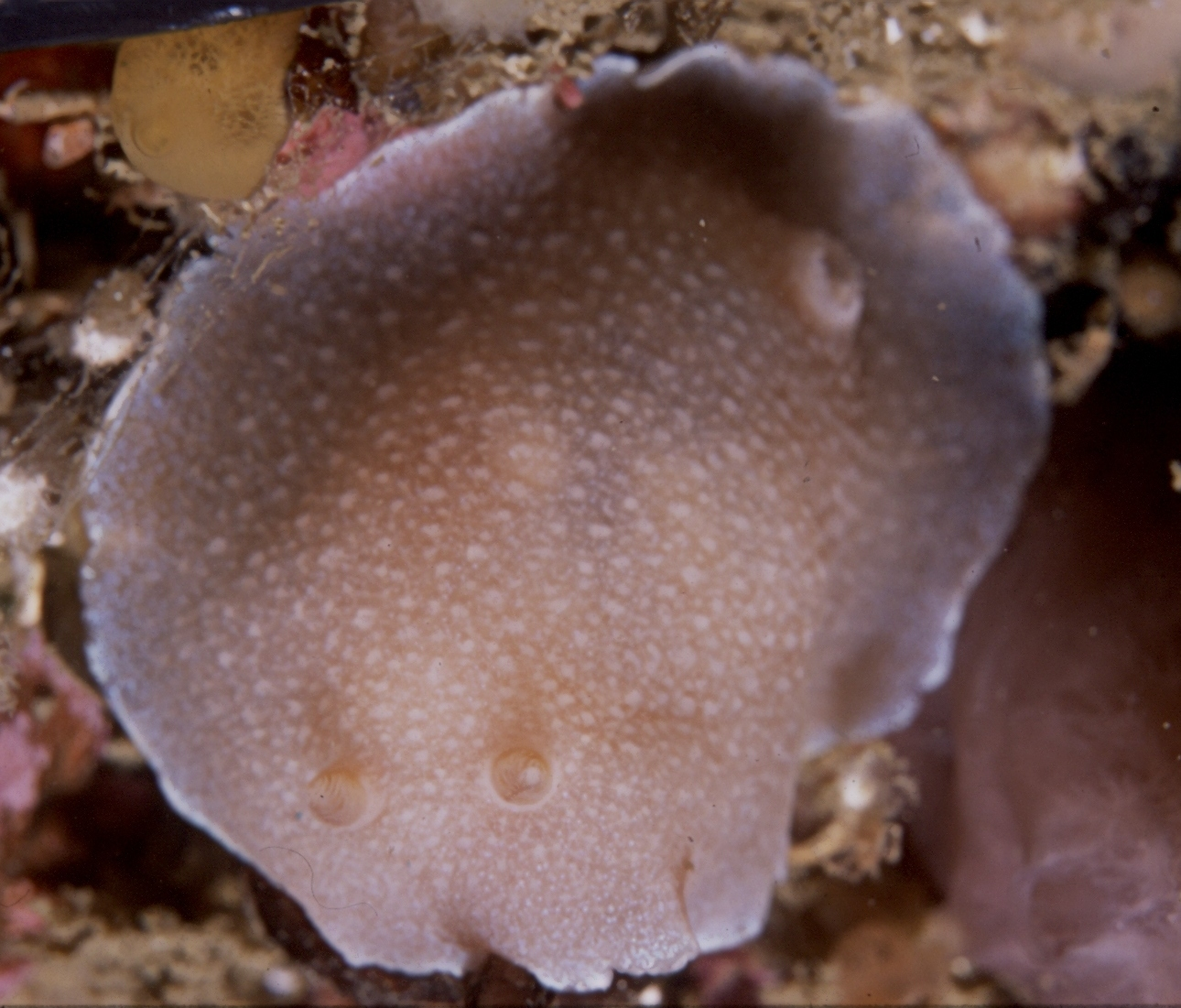
- A live individual of Doriopsilla capensis, head end towards the lower left.

Scientific classification
- Kingdom: Animalia
- Phylum: Mollusca
- Class: Gastropoda
- Order: Nudibranchia
- Family: Dendrodorididae
- Genus: Doriopsilla
- Species: D. capensis

Binomial name
- Doriopsilla capensis (Bergh, 1907)

= White-spotted nudibranch =

Species of gastropod

The white-spotted nudibranch (Doriopsilla capensis) is a species of sea slug, a dorid nudibranch. It is a marine gastropod mollusc in the family Dendrodorididae.

== Distribution ==
This species has so far only been found around the southern African coast off the Atlantic side of the Cape Peninsula in 10–30 m. It is probably endemic.

== Description ==
The white-spotted nudibranch has a translucent white- to tan-coloured body, which may have a bluish tinge. The body is covered with white protuberances. The margin is opaque white. The perfoliate rhinophores are cream-coloured as is the gill rosette. It may reach a total length of 30 mm.

== Ecology ==
This species has been found among sponges.
