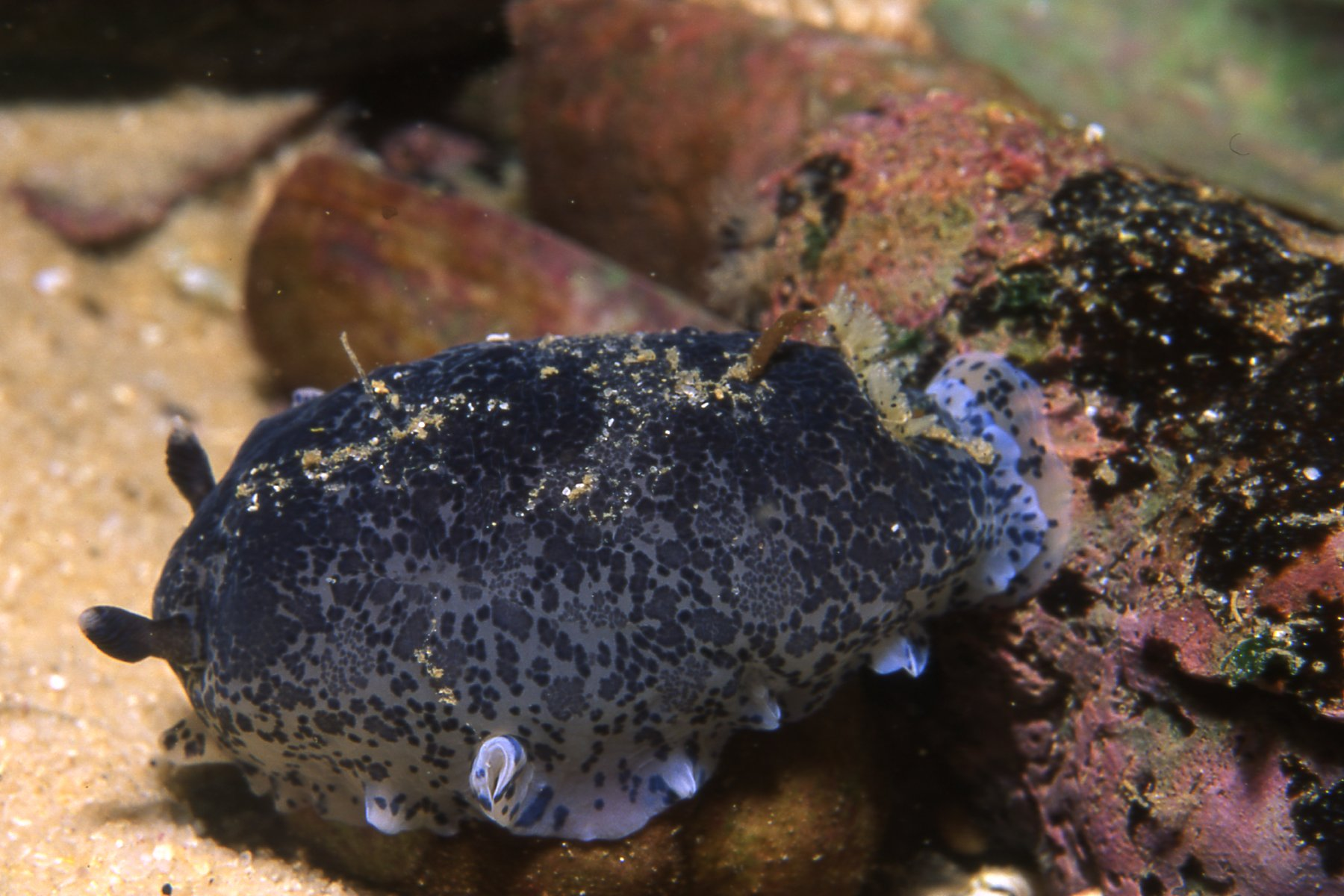
- Dendrodoris caesia

Scientific classification
- Kingdom: Animalia
- Phylum: Mollusca
- Class: Gastropoda
- Order: Nudibranchia
- Family: Dendrodorididae
- Genus: Dendrodoris; Ehrenberg, 1831

Diversity
- at least 40 species

Synonyms
- Doridopsis Alder & Hancock, 1864

= Dendrodoris =

Genus of gastropods

Dendrodoris is a genus of nudibranchs, marine gastropod molluscs in the family Dendrodorididae.

== Species ==
Species so far described in this genus include:

- Dendrodoris albobrunnea Allan, 1933
- Dendrodoris albopurpura Burn, 1957
- Dendrodoris angolensis Valdés & Ortea, 1996
- Dendrodoris arborescens (Collingwood, 1881)
- Dendrodoris areolata (Alder & Hancock, 1864)
- Dendrodoris atromaculata (Alder & Hancock, 1864)
- Dendrodoris aurea (Quoy & Gaimard, 1832)
- Dendrodoris azineae Behrens & Valdes, 2004
- Dendrodris behrensi Millen & Bertsch, 2005
- Dendrodoris brodieae Valdés, 2001
- Dendrodoris caesia (Bergh, 1907)
- Dendrodoris carbunculosa (Kelaart, 1858)
- Dendrodoris citrina (Cheeseman, 1881)
- Dendrodoris coronata Kay & Young, 1969
- Dendrodoris denisoni (Angas, 1864)
- Dendrodoris elizabethina (Kelaart, 1859)
- Dendrodoris elongata Baba, 1936
- Dendrodoris fulva (MacFarland, 1905)
- Dendrodoris fumata (Rüppell & Leuckart, 1830)
- Dendrodoris goani Rao & Kumary, 1973
- Dendrodoris grandiflora (Rapp, 1827)
- Dendrodoris guineana Valdés & Ortea, 1996
- Dendrodoris guttata (Odhner, 1917)
- Dendrodoris herytra Valdés & Ortea in Valdés, Ortea, Avila & Ballesteros, 1996
- Dendrodoris kranjiensis Lim & Chou, 1970
- Dendrodoris krebsii (Morch, 1863)
- Dendrodoris krusensternii (Gray, 1850)
- Dendrodoris limbata (Cuvier, 1804)
- Dendrodoris magagnai Ortea & Espinosa, 2001
- Dendrodoris maugeana Burn, 1962
- Dendrodoris nigra (Stimpson, 1855)
- Dendrodoris nigromaculata (Cockerell, 1905)
- Dendrodoris nigropunctata (Vayssière, 1912)
- Dendrodoris orbicularis Valdes, 2001
- Dendrodoris rainfordi Allan, 1932
- Dendrodoris rubra (Kelaart)
- Dendrodoris sadoensis Baba, 1993
- Dendrodoris senegalensis Bouchet, 1975
- Dendrodiris stohleri Millen & Bertsch, 2005
- Dendrodoris tuberculosa (Quoy & Gaimard, 1832)
- Dendrodoris warta Ev. Marcus & Er. Marcus, 1976

Taxon inquirendum

- Dendrodoris jousseaumei (Vayssière, 1912)

Species brought into synonymy

- Dendrodoris australiensis (Abraham, 1877): synonym of Dendrodoris nigra (Stimpson, 1855)
- Dendrodoris clavalata (Alder & Hancock, 1864): synonym of Dendrodoris krusensternii (Gray, 1850)
- Dendrodoris davisi (Allan, 1933): synonym of Doriopsilla miniata (Alder & Hancock, 1864)
- Dendrodoris denisoni (Angas, 1864): synonym of Dendrodoris krusensternii (Gray, 1850)
- Dendrodoris gemmacea (Alder & Hancock, 1864): synonym of Dendrodoris denisoni (Angas, 1864): synonym of Dendrodoris krusensternii (Gray, 1850)
- Dendrodoris kalkensis (Barnard, 1927): synonym of Dendrodoris caesia (Bergh, 1907)
- Dendrodoris melaena (Allan, 1932): synonym of Dendrodoris nigra (Stimpson, 1855)
- Dendrodoris singaporensis (Lim & Chou, 1970): synonym of Dendrodoris atromaculata (Alder & Hancock, 1864)
- Dendrodoris gunnamatta (Allan, 1932): synonym of Dendrodoris krusensternii (Gray, 1850)
