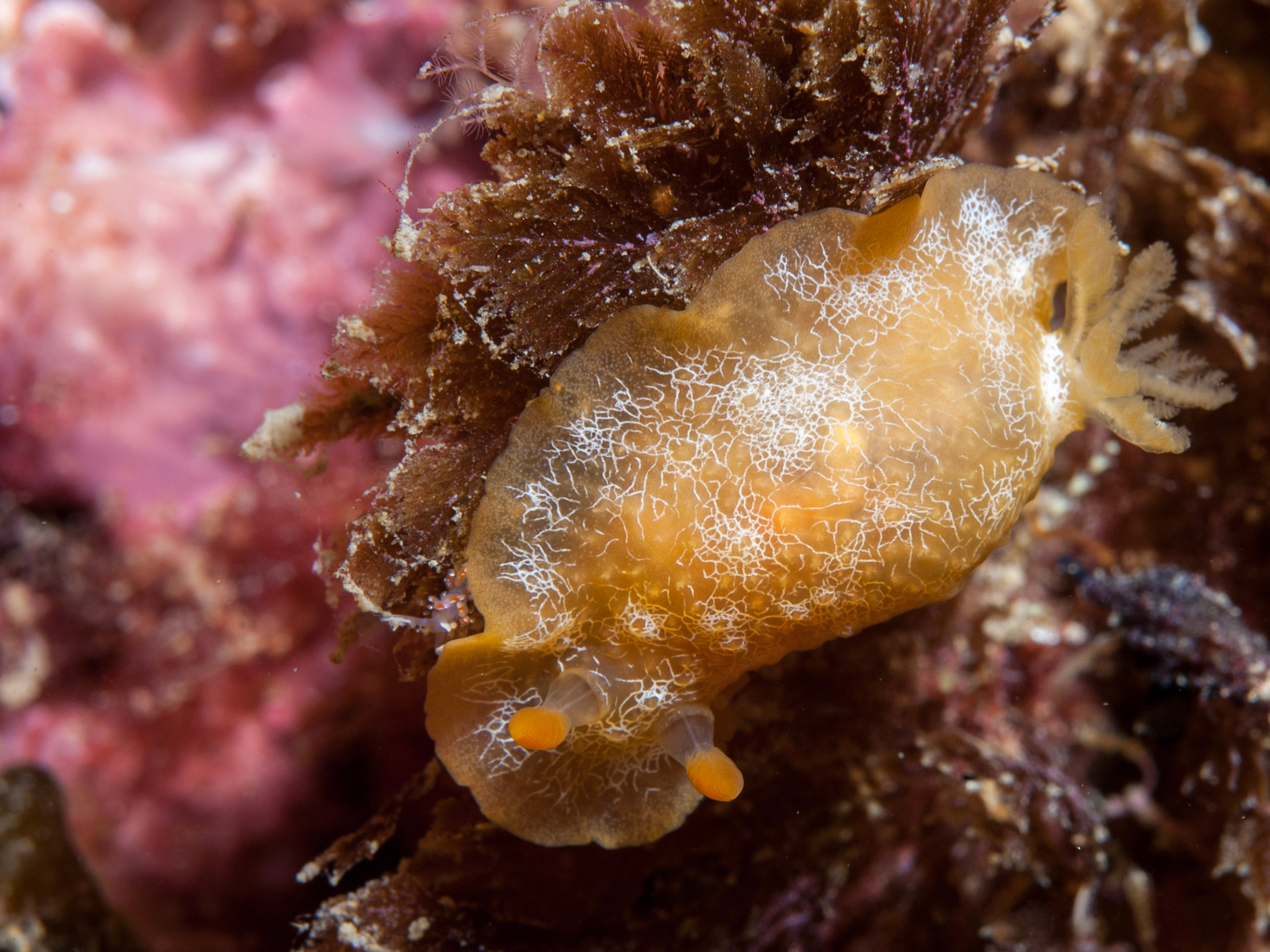
- Sagres, Portugal.

Scientific classification
- Kingdom: Animalia
- Phylum: Mollusca
- Class: Gastropoda
- Order: Nudibranchia
- Family: Dendrodorididae
- Genus: Doriopsilla
- Species: D. areolata

Binomial name
- Doriopsilla areolata Bergh, 1880

= Doriopsilla areolata =

Species of gastropod

Doriopsilla areolata is a species of dorid nudibranch, a colourful sea slug, a shell-less marine gastropod mollusc in the family Dendrodorididae.

== Distribution ==
This species was described from the Adriatic Sea, in the eastern Mediterranean Sea.

== Description ==
This nudibranch can grow as large as 40 mm. The mantle can vary in colour from translucent cream to orange or brown, usually with an irregular pattern of white lines. The rhinophores are pale yellow to orange in colour, and the gills are also yellow to orange.
