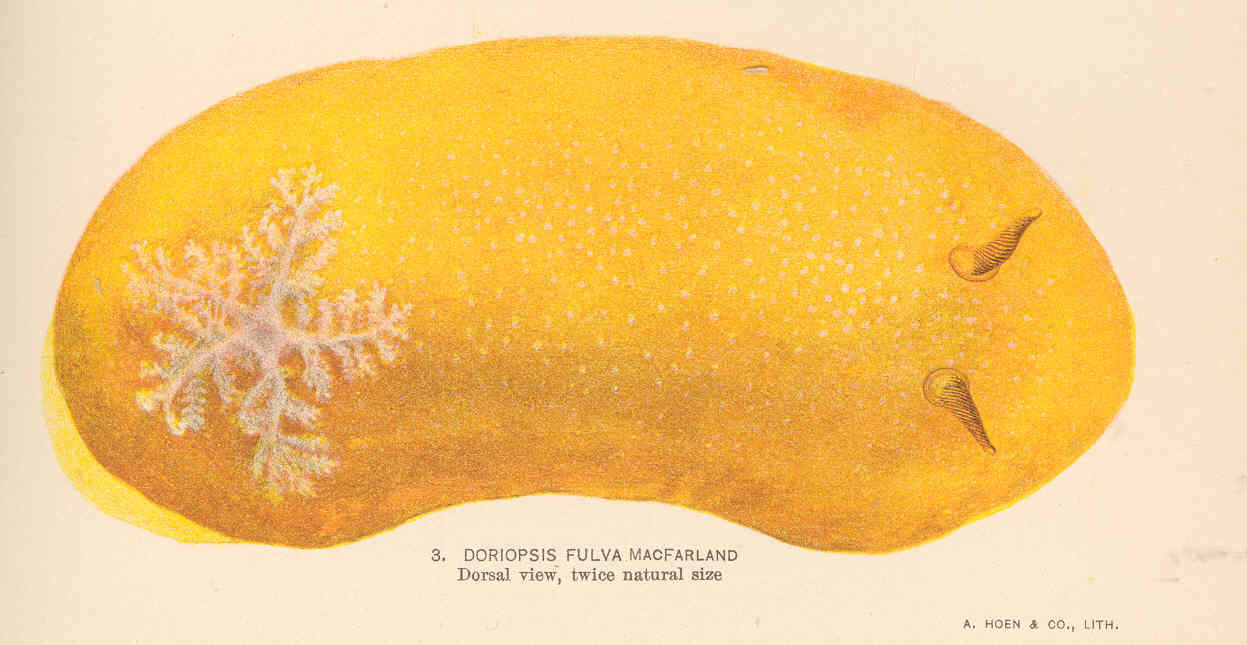
- Drawing of dorsal view of Doriopsilla fulva

Scientific classification
- Kingdom: Animalia
- Phylum: Mollusca
- Class: Gastropoda
- Order: Nudibranchia
- Family: Dendrodorididae
- Genus: Doriopsilla
- Species: D. fulva

Binomial name
- Doriopsilla fulva (MacFarland, 1905)

Synonyms
- Doriopsis fulva MacFarland, 1905

= Doriopsilla fulva =

Species of gastropod

Doriopsilla fulva is a species of dorid nudibranch, a sea slug, a shell-less marine gastropod mollusk in the family Dendrodorididae.

== Distribution ==
This species is found from Point Loma, San Diego to Humboldt County California.

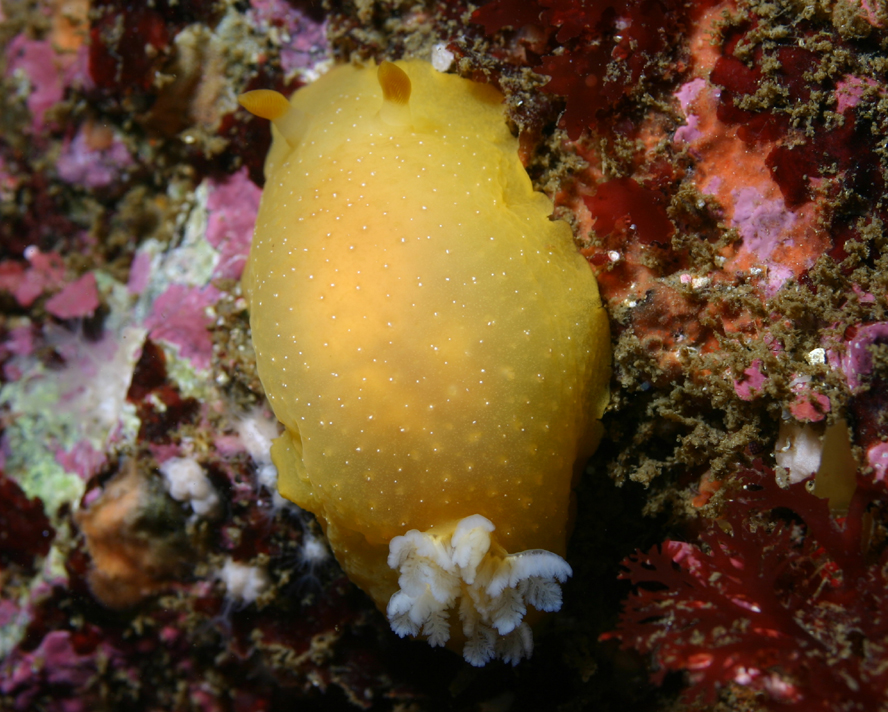
Doriopsilla fulva

== Description ==
This nudibranch can grow as large as 33 mm. It is pale yellow in colour, with dots of opaque white on the tips of the dorsal tubercles but not between the tubercles. The rhinophores have 10-12 lamellae and a pale yellow club with a white stalk. The gills are white with five pinnae. It has frequently been confused with Doriopsilla albopunctata and several other species which form a pseudocryptic species complex.

== Life habits ==
Doriopsilla fulva eats sponges.
