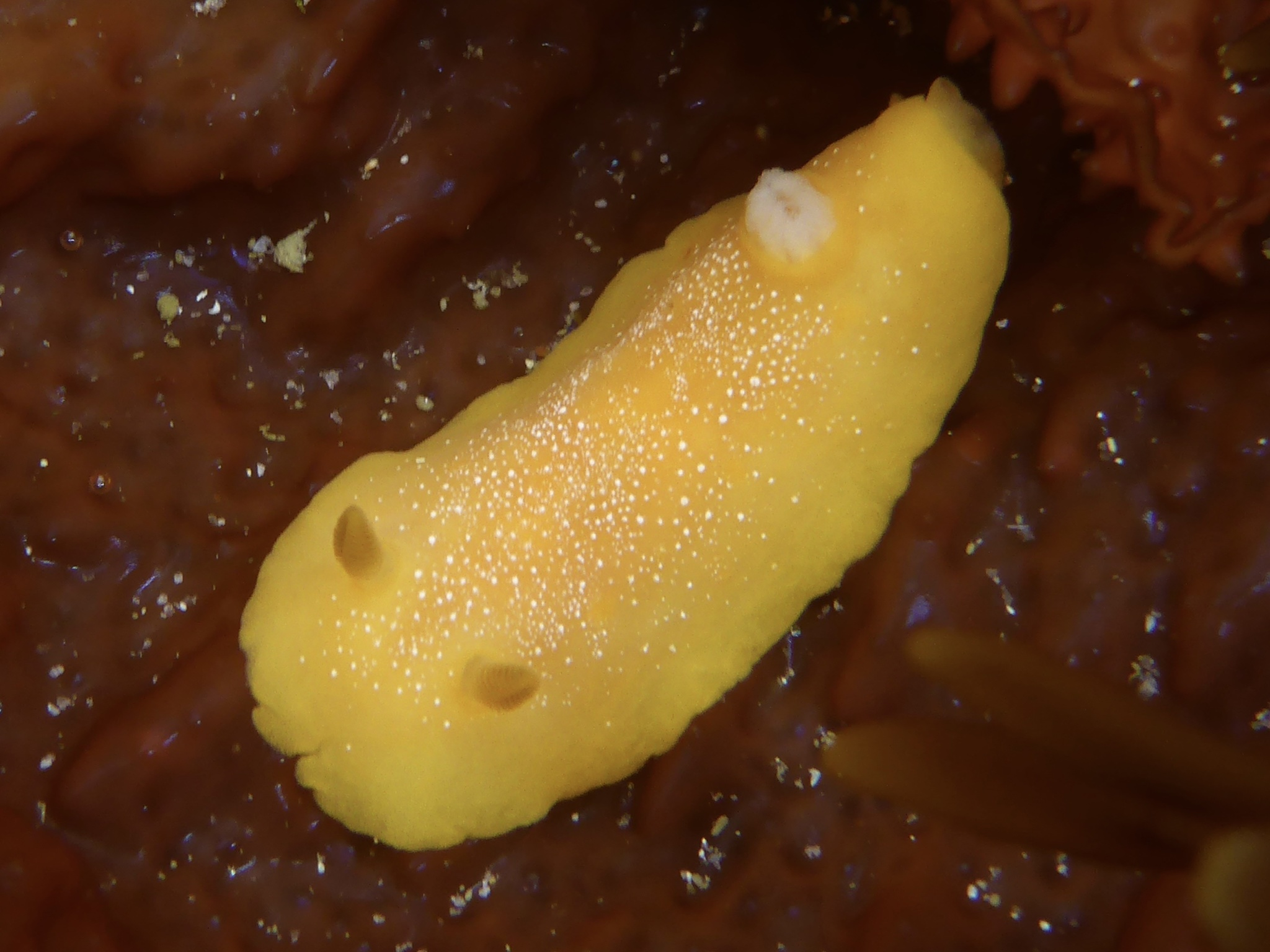
- Pacific Grove, California, 2021

Scientific classification
- Kingdom: Animalia
- Phylum: Mollusca
- Class: Gastropoda
- Order: Nudibranchia
- Family: Discodorididae
- Genus: Baptodoris
- Species: B. mimetica

Binomial name
- Baptodoris mimetica Gosliner, 1991

= Baptodoris mimetica =

Species of gastropod

Baptodoris mimetica is a species of sea slug or dorid nudibranch, a marine gastropod mollusk in the family Discodorididae.

== Distribution ==
This species was described from Asilomar State Park, Pacific Grove, California, with additional specimens from Santa Cruz, Carmel and Isla San Martin, Baja California, Mexico.
