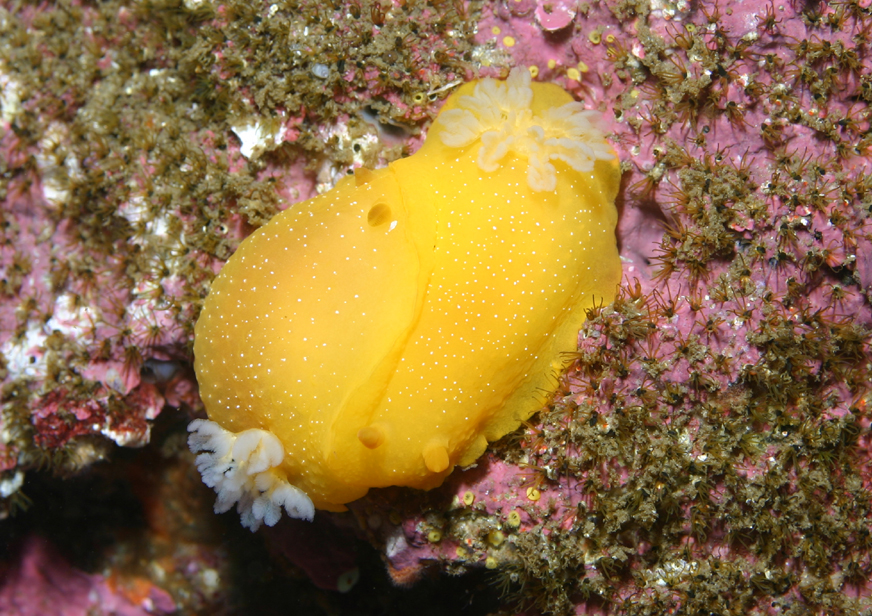
- Doriopsilla albopunctata

Scientific classification
- Kingdom: Animalia
- Phylum: Mollusca
- Class: Gastropoda
- Order: Nudibranchia
- Superfamily: Phyllidioidea
- Family: Dendrodorididae; O'Donoghue, 1924

Genera
- See text.

Synonyms
- Doridopsidae Alder & Hancock, 1864

= Dendrodorididae =

Family of gastropods

Dendrodorididae is a taxonomic family of sea slugs, dorid nudibranchs, marine gastropod molluscs in the Superfamily Phyllidioidea.

== Genera ==
A maximum-parsimony analysis of the nucleotide sequence of the 16S mtDNA gene, performed in 2003, has shown that the family Dendrodoridae is paraphyletic. Genera in the family Dendrodorididae presently include:

- Dendrodoris Ehrenberg, 1831
- Doriopsilla Bergh, 1880
