= Adeonellidae =

Adeonellidae Temporal range: Eocene - Recent

Scientific classification
- Kingdom: Animalia
- Phylum: Bryozoa
- Class: Gymnolaemata
- Order: Cheilostomatida
- Suborder: Flustrina
- Family: Adeonellidae; Gregory, 1893

Genera
- Adeonella; Laminopora

Family of bryozoans

The Adeonellidae is a family within the bryozoan order Cheilostomatida. Colonies are often upright bilaminar branches or sheets. The zooids generally have one or more adventitious avicularia on their frontal wall. Instead of ovicells the adeonids often possess enlarged polymorphs which brood the larvae internally.

The apparent similarity in characters to the family Adeonidae can make their separation debatable. As of October 2023 the family is unaccepted on the World Register of Marine Species and is considered a synonym of Adeonidae Busk, 1884.
