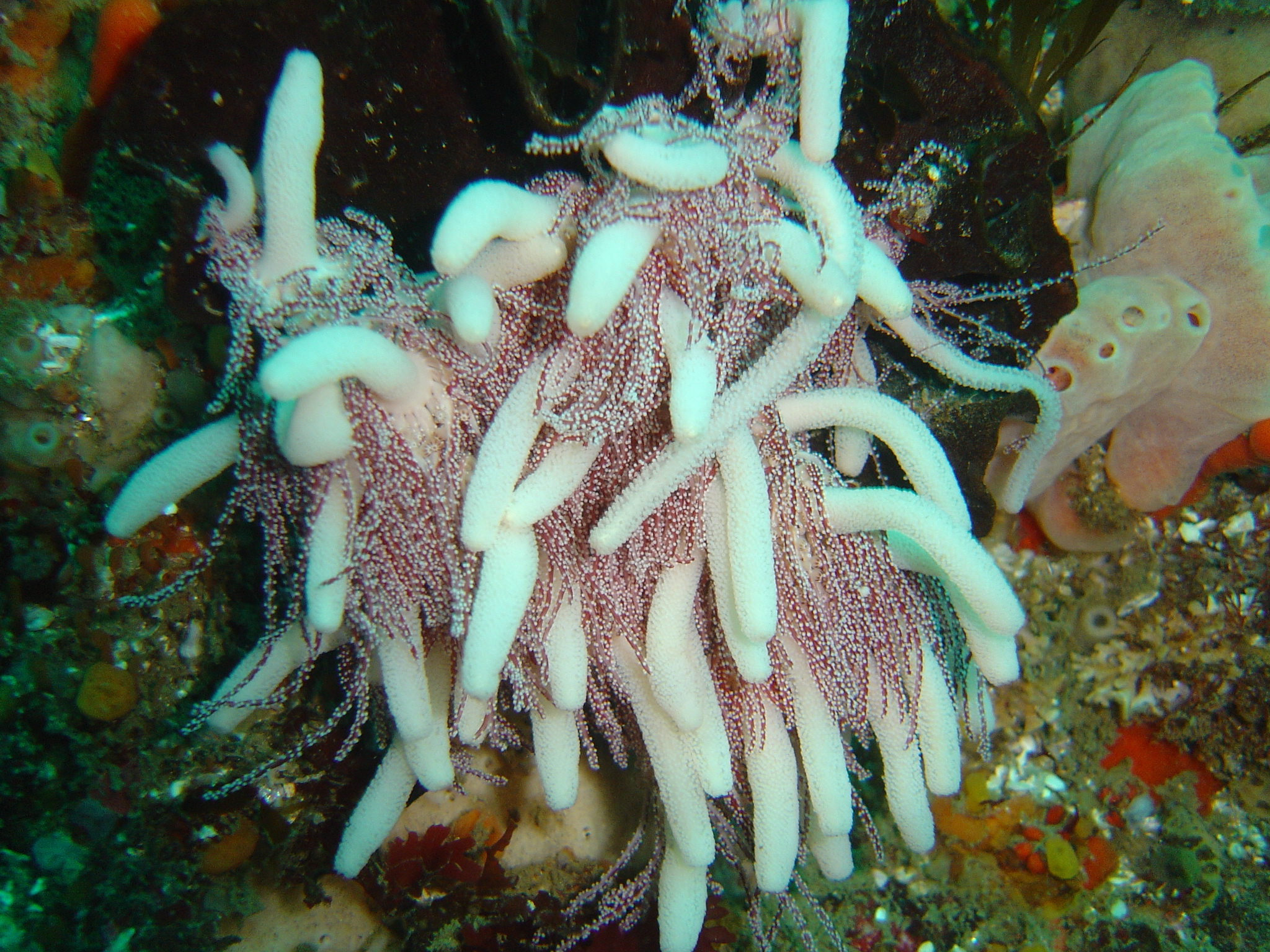

Scientific classification
- Domain: Eukaryota
- Kingdom: Animalia
- Phylum: Cnidaria
- Class: Hydrozoa
- Order: Anthoathecata
- Family: Candelabridae
- Genus: Candelabrum
- Species: C. tentaculatum

Binomial name
- Candelabrum tentaculatum Millard, 1966)

Synonyms
- Myriothela tentaculata Millard 1966.

= Candelabrum tentaculatum =

Species of cnidarian

Candelabrum tentaculatum, also called the dreadlocks hydroid or calamari hydroid, is a sessile marine hydroid, that is found off the Cape Peninsula of South Africa.

== Description ==
Naked cylindrical hydranth up to about 70mm long, covered by densely packed short capitate tentacles. Basal part carries a single whorl of about 17 long unbranched blastostyles, with gonophores near the hydranth.

== Species range ==
Endemic to South Africa, known only from the Cape Peninsula and Port Elizabeth in 10 to 30 m of water.

== Identification ==
Pale off-white slightly tapering cylindrical central part with rounded tip, covered with very short rounded tentacles. The base has a ring of long floppy reddish tentacles that drape over the substrate.

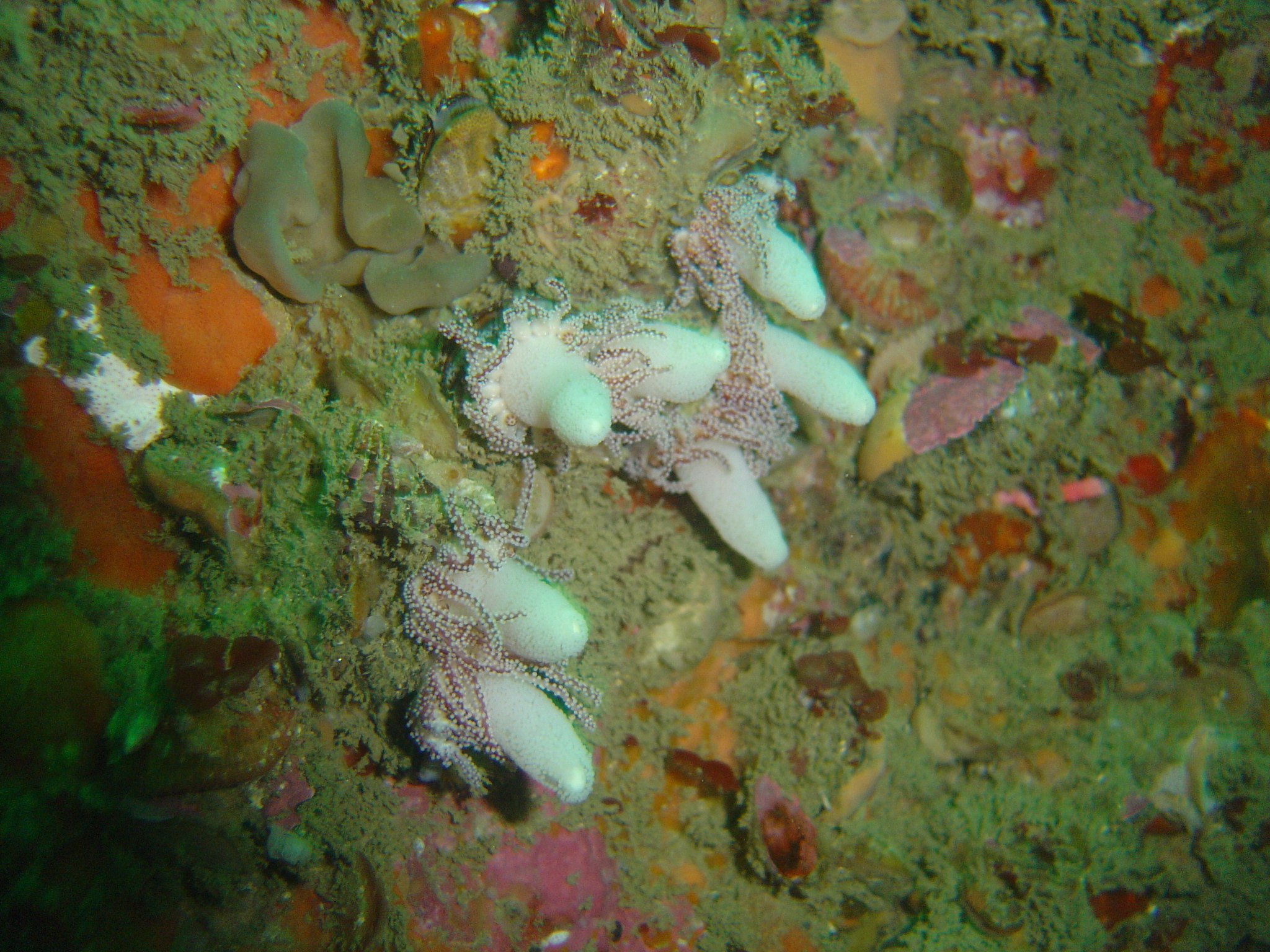
Small group off Clifton, Cape Town.

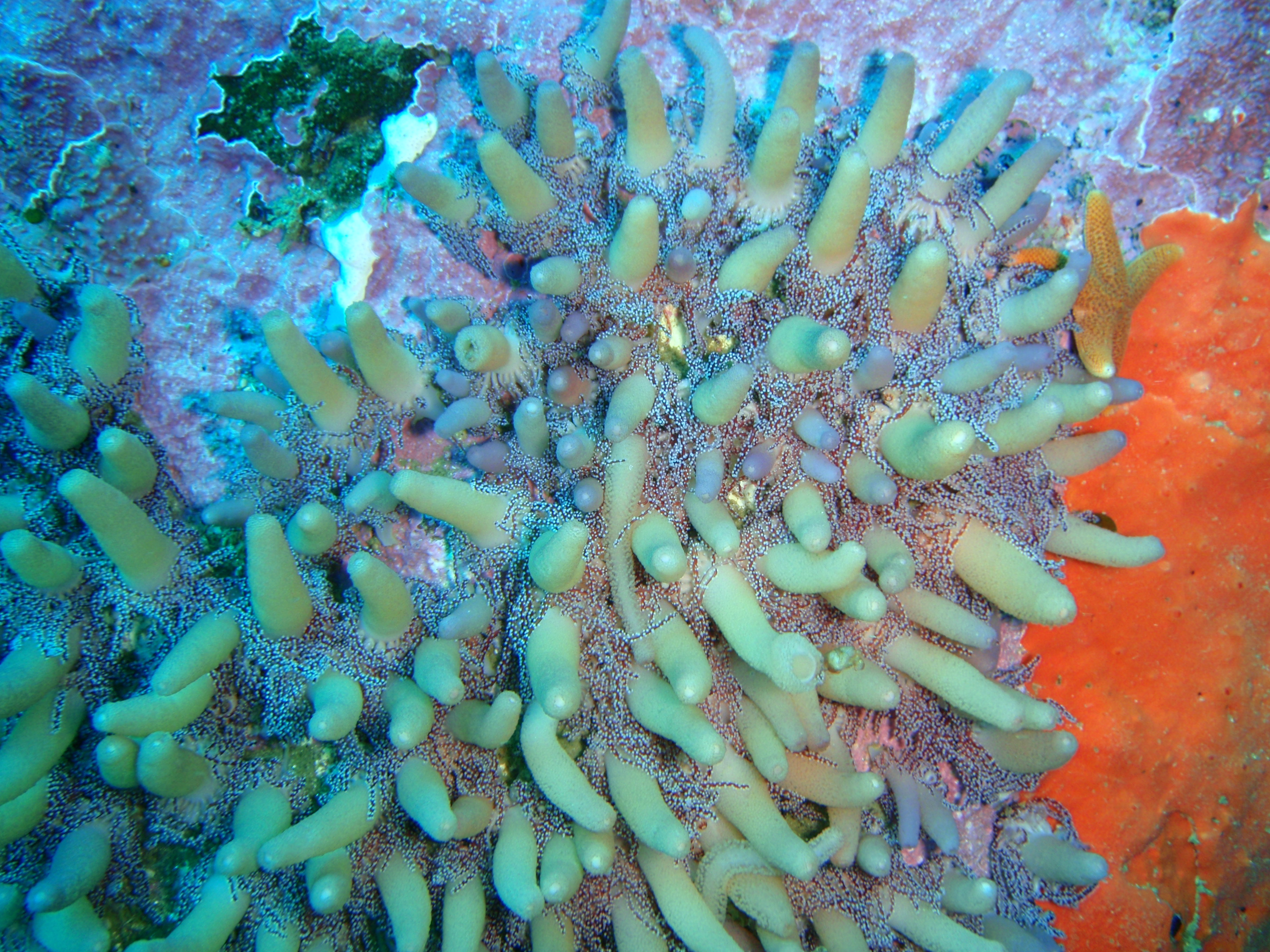
Large group off Oudekraal, Cape Town.

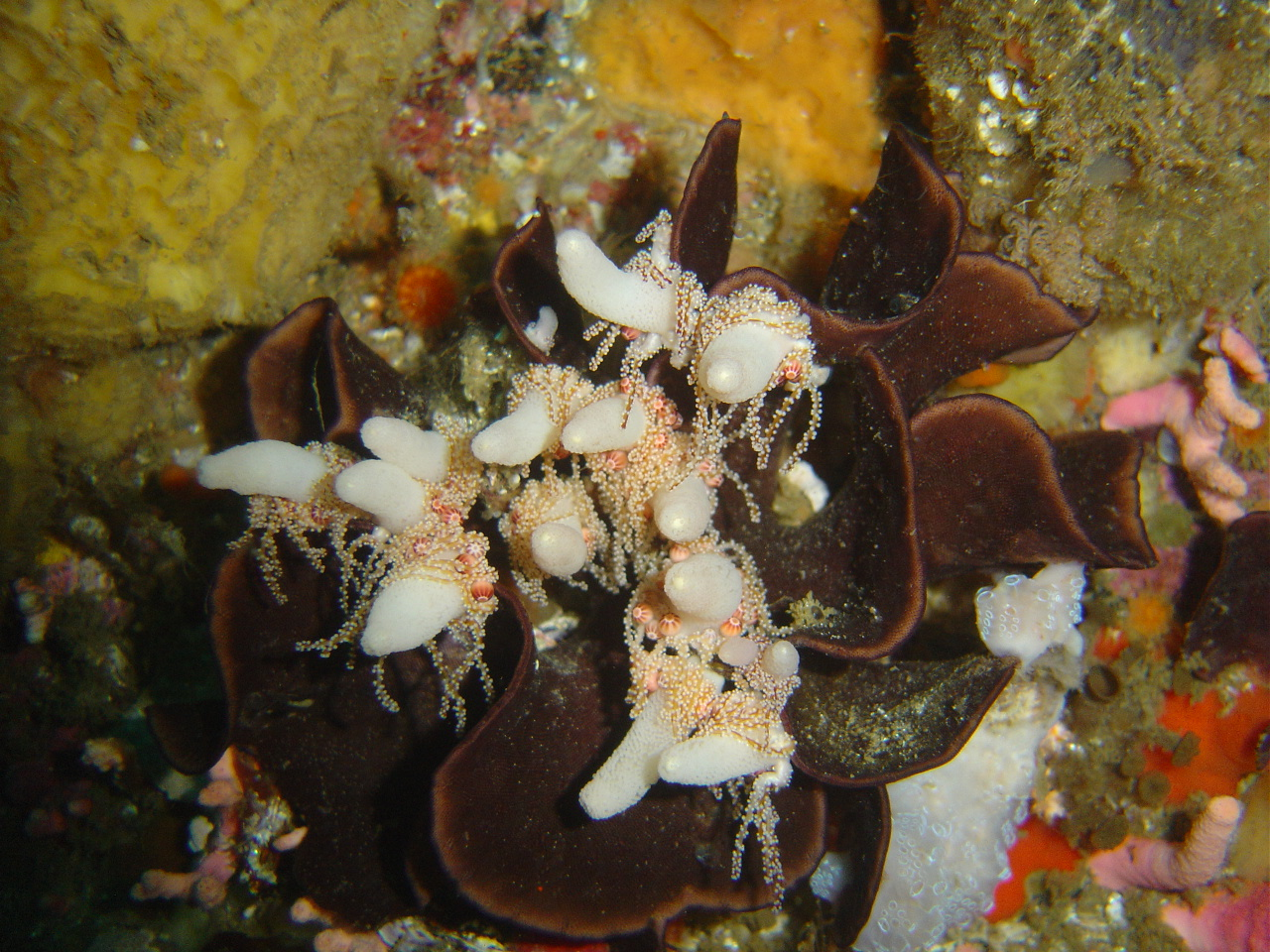
Candelabrum tentaculatum on Laminopora jellyae, off Hout Bay, Cape Town.

== Natural history ==
Often found on pore-plated false corals Laminopora jellyae.
