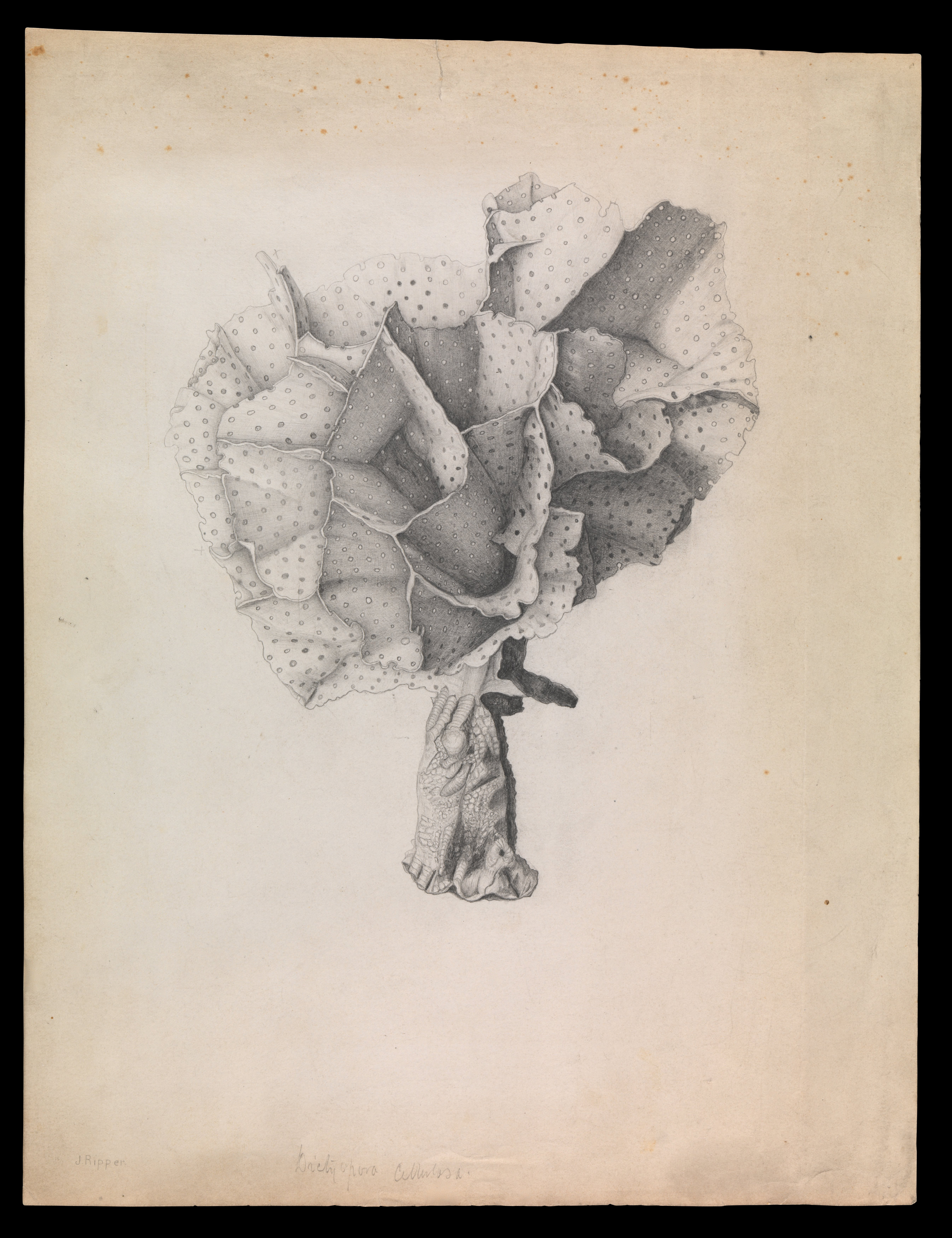

Scientific classification
- Kingdom: Animalia
- Phylum: Bryozoa
- Class: Gymnolaemata
- Order: Cheilostomatida
- Family: Adeonidae
- Genus: Adeona; J. V. Lamouroux, 1812

= Adeona =

Genus of moss animals

"Adenoa" of C.S. Rafinesque-Schmaltz is a nomen nudum for Galleria, the genus of the greater wax moth.

Adeona is a genus of bryozoans in the family Adeonidae. A typical example is the Australian species Adeona cellulosa that forms large colonies with bifoliate sheets containing numerous holes (fenestrae).

== Selected species ==
- Adeona albida
- Adeona appendiculata
- Adeona arborescens
- Adeona articulata
- Adeona bipartita
- Adeona cellulosa
- Adeona costata
- Adeona didymopora
- Adeona foliifera
- Adeona grisea
- Adeona intermedia
- Adeona macrothyris
- Adeona nipponica
- Adeona wilsoni
