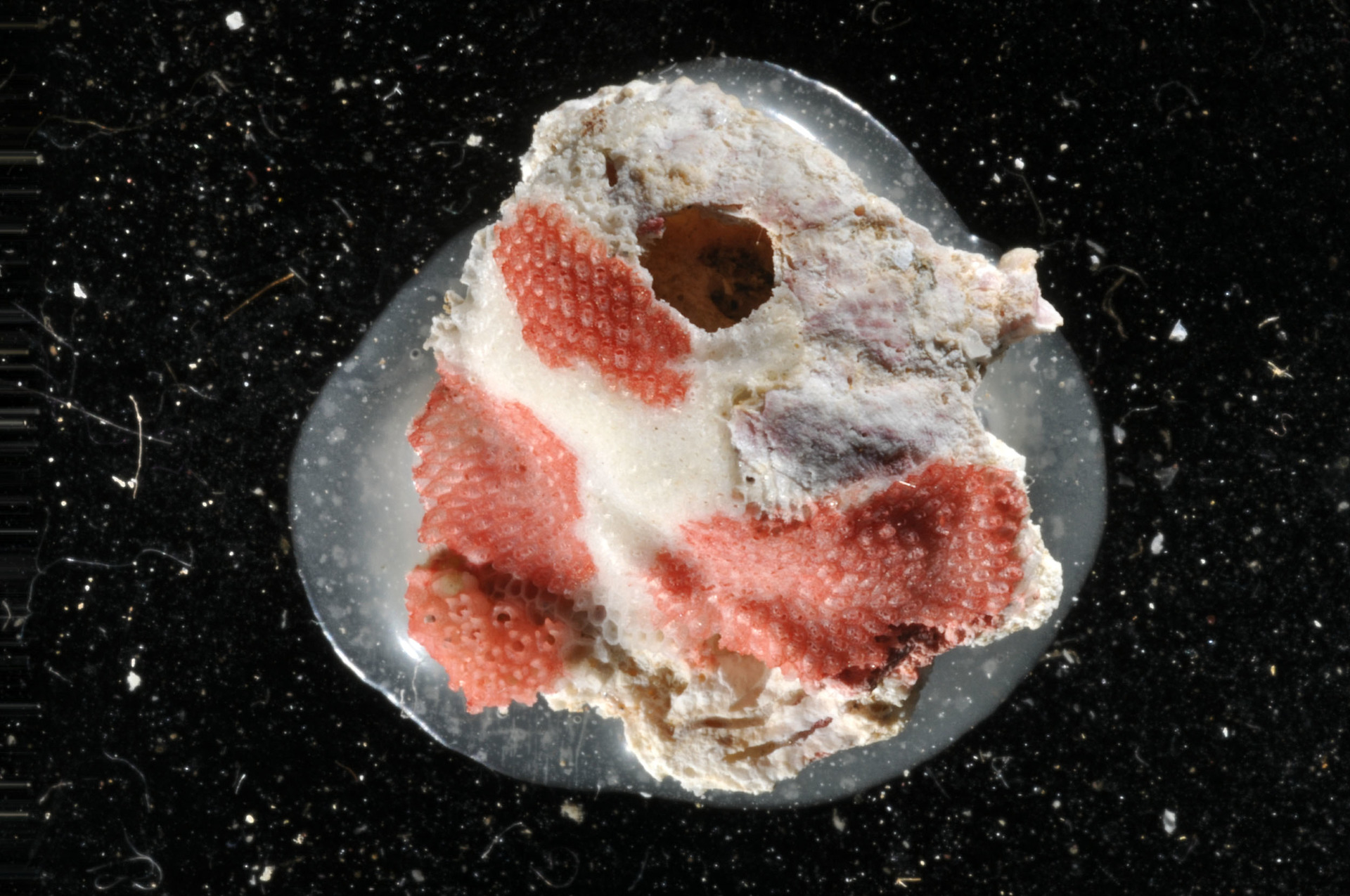
- A Specimen of Reptadeonella in Yale University Peabody Museum

Scientific classification
- Kingdom: Animalia
- Phylum: Bryozoa
- Class: Gymnolaemata
- Order: Cheilostomatida
- Family: Adeonidae
- Genus: Reptadeonella; Busk, 1884

= Reptadeonella =

Genus of bryozoans

Reptadeonella is a genus of bryozoans belonging to the family Adeonidae.

The genus has almost cosmopolitan distribution.

Species:

- Reptadeonella aspera Almeida, Souza, Sanner & Vieira, 2015
- Reptadeonella bipartita (Canu & Bassler, 1928)
- Reptadeonella brasiliensis Almeida, Souza, Sanner & Vieira, 2015
- Reptadeonella buddae Cheetham, Sanner & Jackson, 2007
- Reptadeonella buricaensis Cheetham, Sanner & Jackson, 2007
- Reptadeonella cellulanus Tilbrook, Hayward & Gordon, 2001
- Reptadeonella collinsae Cheetham, Sanner & Jackson, 2007
- Reptadeonella costulata (Canu & Bassler, 1928)
- Reptadeonella cucullata Almeida, Souza, Sanner & Vieira, 2015
- Reptadeonella curvabilis Di Martino & Taylor, 2015
- Reptadeonella dimidiata Winston & Jackson, 2021
- Reptadeonella falciformis Tilbrook, 2006
- Reptadeonella fissa (Hincks, 1880)
- Reptadeonella granulosa Winston & Vieira, 2013
- Reptadeonella hastingsae Cheetham & Sandberg, 1964
- Reptadeonella heckeli (Reuss, 1848)
- Reptadeonella hymanae Soule, 1961
- Reptadeonella hystricosus Tilbrook, 2006
- Reptadeonella insidiosa (Jullien, 1903)
- Reptadeonella joloensis (Bassler, 1936)
- Reptadeonella leilae Almeida, Souza, Sanner & Vieira, 2015
- Reptadeonella levinseni (Borg, 1940)
- Reptadeonella novissima Tilbrook, Hayward & Gordon, 2001
- Reptadeonella obstipa Winston & Jackson, 2021
- Reptadeonella phelleaphila Tilbrook, 2006
- Reptadeonella plagiopora (Busk, 1859)
- Reptadeonella santamariae Haugen, Novosel, Wisshak & Berning, 2020
- Reptadeonella sicilis Tilbrook, 2006
- Reptadeonella toddi Di Martino & Taylor, 2015
- Reptadeonella tubulifera (Canu & Bassler, 1930)
- Reptadeonella umbilicata (Lonsdale, 1845)
- Reptadeonella violacea (Johnston, 1847)
- Reptadeonella violacea (Julien, 1903)
- Reptadeonella yeonbora Yang, Seo & Gordon, 2018
- Reptadeonella zabalai Haugen, Novosel, Wisshak & Berning, 2020
