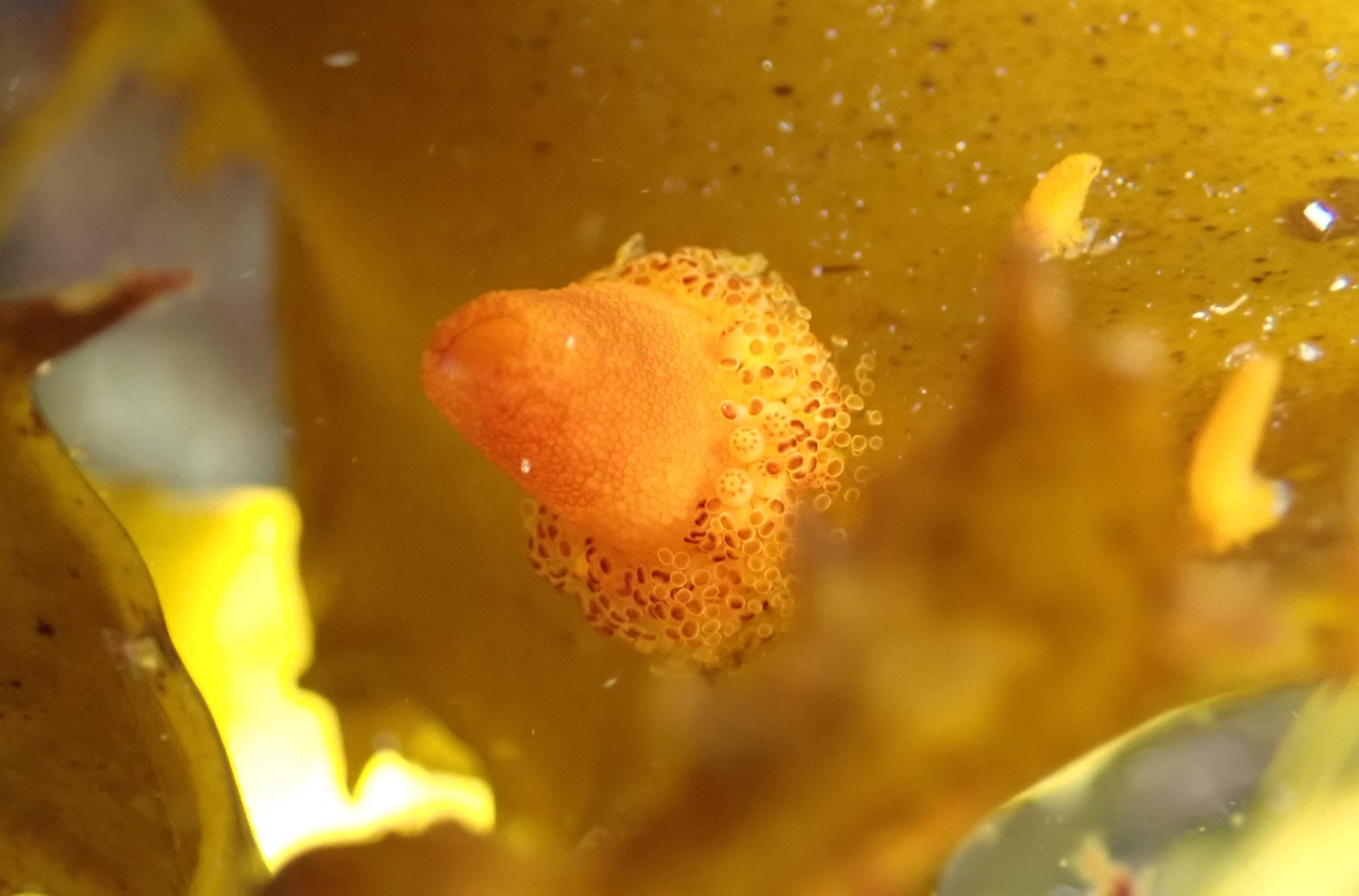

Scientific classification
- Kingdom: Animalia
- Phylum: Cnidaria
- Class: Hydrozoa
- Order: Anthoathecata
- Family: Candelabridae
- Genus: Candelabrum
- Species: C. australe

Binomial name
- Candelabrum australe (Briggs, 1928)

= Candelabrum australe =

Species of hydrozoan

Candelabrum australe is a marine invertebrate animal species. It is a cnidarian within the class Hydrozoa.

== Description ==
The living hydroid is dark orange with paler longitudinal bands when its body is extended.

== Range ==
It may be endemic to southern Australia and New Zealand.

== Habitat ==
The polyp stage is typically observed attached to kelp. Less is known about the larval stage
