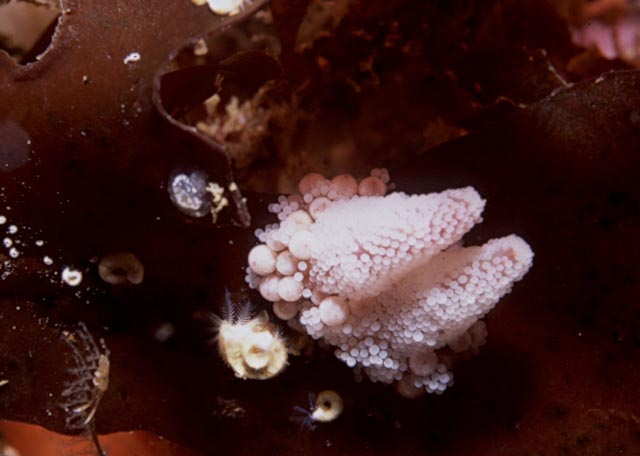
- Candelabrum capensis

Scientific classification
- Kingdom: Animalia
- Phylum: Cnidaria
- Class: Hydrozoa
- Order: Anthoathecata
- Suborder: Aplanulata
- Family: Candelabridae; Stechow, 1921

Genera and species
- See text

Synonyms
- Myriothelidae

= Candelabridae =

Family of hydrozoans

Candelabridae is a small family of cnidarians within the class Hydrozoa. Myriothelidae Hincks, 1868 and Symplectaneidae Fraser, 1941 are now accepted as synonyms of this family.

== Genera and Species ==
According to the World Register of Marine Species, the following genera and species exist in this family:

- Candelabrum de Blainville, 1880 synonym Myriothela Sars, 1850
  - Candelabrum australe (Briggs, 1928)
  - Candelabrum austrogeorgiae (Jäderholm, 1904)
  - Candelabrum austro-georgiae Jäderholm, 1905
  - Candelabrum capensis (Manton, 1940)
  - Candelabrum cocksii (Cocks, 1854)
  - Candelabrum fritchmanii Hewitt & Goddard, 2001
  - Candelabrum giganteum (Bonnevie, 1898)
  - Candelabrum harrisoni (Briggs, 1928)
  - Candelabrum meridianum (Briggs, 1939)
  - Candelabrum minutum (Bonnevie, 1898)
  - Candelabrum mitra (Bonnevie, 1898)
  - Candelabrum penola (Manton, 1940)
  - Candelabrum phrygium (Fabricius, 1780)
  - Candelabrum serpentarii Segonzac & Vervoort, 1995
  - Candelabrum tentaculatum (Millard, 1966)
  - Candelabrum verrucosum (Bonnevie, 1898)
- Fabulosus Stepanjants, Sheiko & Napara, 1990
  - Fabulosus kurilensis Stepanjants, Sheiko & Napara, 1990
- Monocoryne Broch, 1910 synonym Symplectanea Fraser, 1941
  - Monocoryne bracteata (Fraser, 1943)
  - Monocoryne colonialis Brinckmann-Voss & Lindner, 2008
  - Monocoryne gigantea (Bonnevie, 1898)
  - Monocoryne minor Millard, 1966
