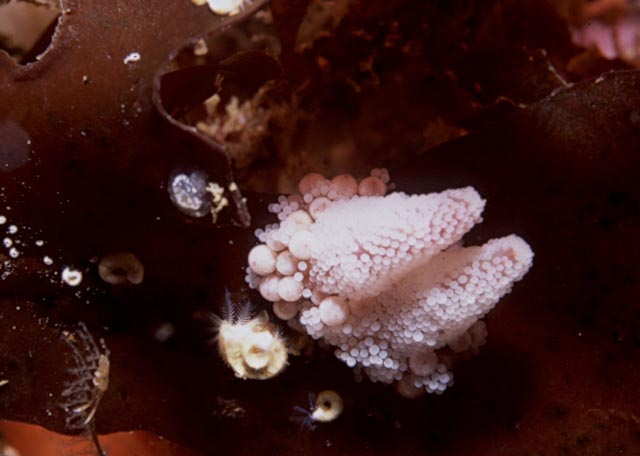

Scientific classification
- Kingdom: Animalia
- Phylum: Cnidaria
- Class: Hydrozoa
- Order: Anthoathecata
- Family: Candelabridae
- Genus: Candelabrum
- Species: C. capensis

Binomial name
- Candelabrum capensis (Manton, 1940)

= Candelabrum capensis =

Species of cnidarian

Candelabrum capensis, or gnome's hat hydroid, is a species of sessile hydroid cnidarian. It is a member of the family Candelabridae.

== Description ==
The gnome's hat hydroid grows to about 3 cm tall. It is a small conical hydroid with 30-40 adhesive knobs at its base. The cone is made up of 400-600 densely packed warty tentacles which contain the stinging cells. Its colour is variable, from a purple-brown to magenta or pale pink.

== Distribution ==
This species is found around the southern African coast from Luderitz in Namibia to East London from the subtidal to at least 27m underwater.

== Ecology ==
These animals are usually found among red seaweed and brown seagrass, singly or in small groups.
