= Laminopora =

Scientific classification
- Kingdom: Animalia
- Phylum: Bryozoa
- Class: Gymnolaemata
- Order: Cheilostomatida
- Family: Adeonidae
- Genus: Laminopora; Michelin, 1842

Genus of bryozoans

Laminopora is a genus of bryozoans belonging to the family Adeonidae.

The species of this genus are found in South America and South Australia.

Species:

- Laminopora bimunita (Hincks, 1891)
- Laminopora contorta Michelin, 1842
- Laminopora dispar (MacGillivray, 1869)
- Laminopora jellyae (Levinsen, 1909)
- Laminopora miocenica Canu & Bassler, 1923
