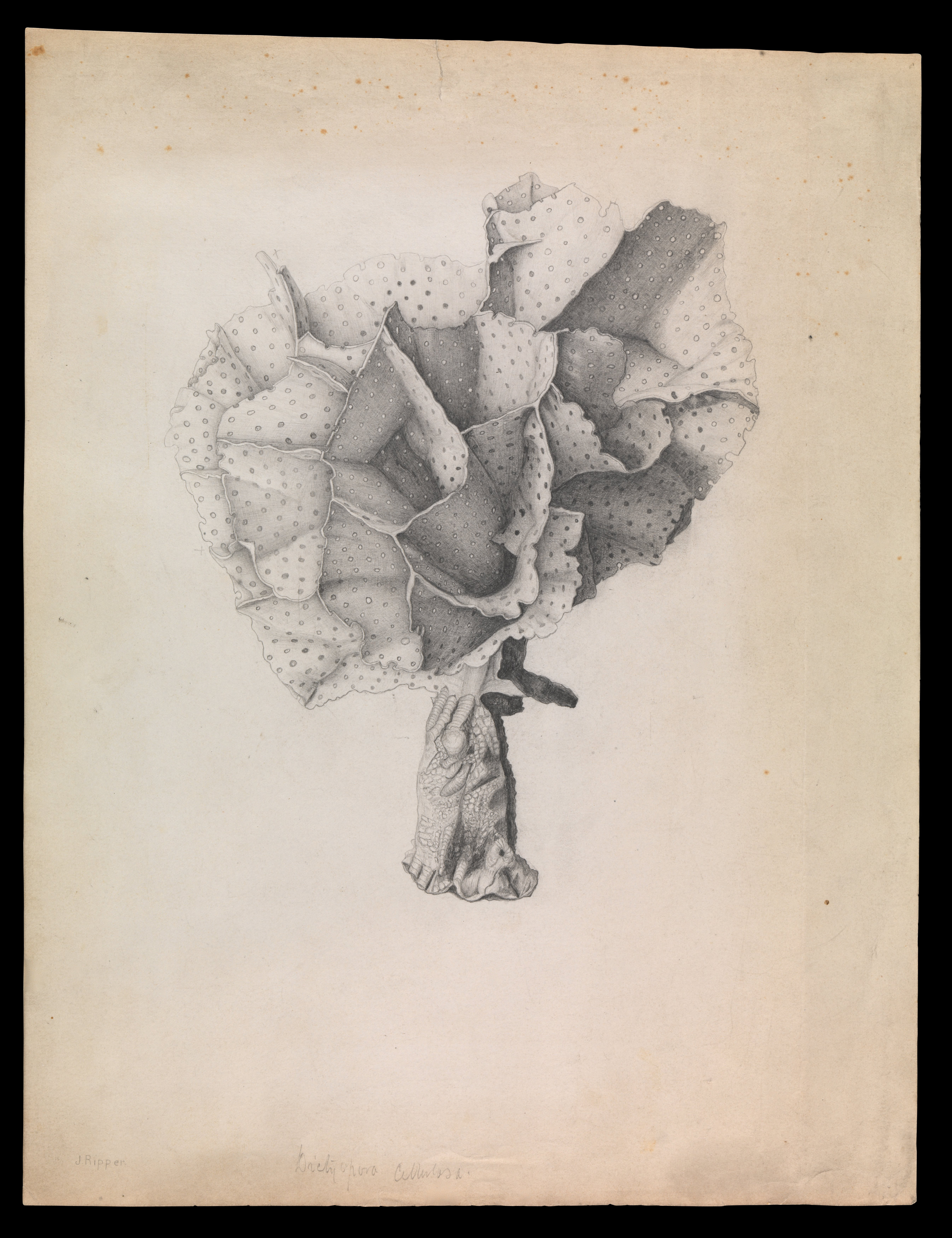
- Adeona cellulosa

Scientific classification
- Kingdom: Animalia
- Phylum: Bryozoa
- Class: Gymnolaemata
- Order: Cheilostomatida
- Suborder: Flustrina
- Superfamily: Adeonoidea
- Family: Adeonidae; Busk, 1884

Genera
- See classification

= Adeonidae =

Adeonidae Temporal range: Eocene - Recent

Family of moss animals

The Adeonidae is a family within the bryozoan order Cheilostomatida. Colonies are often upright bilaminar branches or sheets, perforated by large holes in some species (e.g. Adeona cellulosa). The zooids generally have one or more adventitious avicularia on their frontal wall. Instead of ovicells the adeonids often possess enlarged polymorphs which brood the larvae internally.

== Classification ==
- Family Adeonidae
  - Genus Adeona
  - Genus Adeonellopsis
  - Genus Anarthropora
  - Genus Bracebridgia
  - Genus Dimorphocella
  - Genus Kubaninella
  - Genus Meniscopora
  - Genus Ovaticella
  - Genus Poristoma
  - Genus Reptadeonella
  - Genus Schizostomella
  - Genus Smittistoma
  - Genus Teichopora
  - Genus Triporula
  - Genus Trypocella
