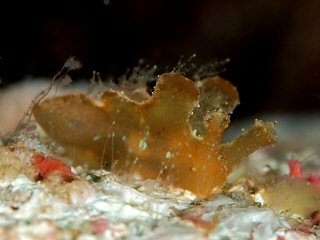

Scientific classification
- Kingdom: Animalia
- Phylum: Mollusca
- Class: Gastropoda
- Order: Nudibranchia
- Suborder: Dendronotacea
- Family: Scyllaeidae
- Genus: Notobryon
- Species: N. bijecurum

Binomial name
- Notobryon bijecurum Baba, 1937

= Notobryon bijecurum =

Species of gastropod

Notobryon bijecurum is a species of sea slug, a nudibranch, a marine gastropod mollusk in the family Scyllaeidae. Reported to occur in tropical oceans from the Indo-Pacific and eastern Pacific to temperate South Africa, the systematics of Notobryon have not been reviewed using modern systematic tools.
