= Crosslandia daedali =

Scientific classification
- Kingdom: Animalia
- Phylum: Mollusca
- Class: Gastropoda
- Order: Nudibranchia
- Suborder: Cladobranchia
- Family: Scyllaeidae
- Genus: Crosslandia
- Species: C. daedali

Binomial name
- Crosslandia daedali Poorman & Mulliner, 1981

Species of sea slug

Crosslandia daedali is a species of sea slug within the family Scyllaeidae, found in subtropical waters in the Eastern Central Pacific Ocean in Mexico and Costa Rica. It lives in benthic environments, usually on algae within the genus Padina where it grazes on small hydroids.

== Description ==
Crosslandia daedali grows to a length of 2.5 centimeters. Its color is described as being a greenish brown-orange, with brown and white lines on the sides and underside of the lobes. 6 small blue spots are found along the middle of the body, with most of them having fine black borders.
