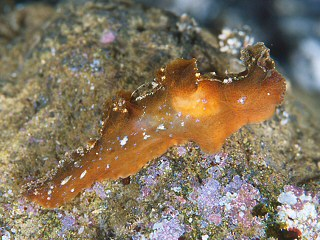

Scientific classification
- Kingdom: Animalia
- Phylum: Mollusca
- Class: Gastropoda
- Order: Nudibranchia
- Suborder: Dendronotacea
- Family: Scyllaeidae
- Genus: Notobryon
- Species: N. clavigerum

Binomial name
- Notobryon clavigerum Baba, 1937

= Notobryon clavigerum =

Species of gastropod

Notobryon clavigerum is a species of sea slug, a nudibranch, a marine gastropod mollusk in the family Scyllaeidae.

== Description ==
The rhinophoral sheaths of Notobryon clavigerum have a crest which is oriented longitudinally running along the posterior margin and the anterior margin. It terminates distally in a wavy margin. With the exception of the tip, the edges of the dorsolateral lobes are smooth, stand up recurved, and display claw-like papillae that are small and in a row. There are three of these on the posterior and five on the anterior.

== Distribution ==
This species is found in the Western Pacific Ocean such as in the waters of Japan.
