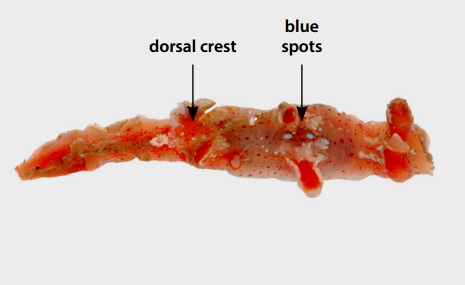

Scientific classification
- Kingdom: Animalia
- Phylum: Mollusca
- Class: Gastropoda
- Order: Nudibranchia
- Suborder: Dendronotacea
- Family: Scyllaeidae
- Genus: Notobryon
- Species: N. thompsoni

Binomial name
- Notobryon thompsoni Pola, Camacho-García & Gosliner, 2012

= Notobryon thompsoni =

Species of gastropod

Notobryon thompsoni, the iridescent bluespot nudibranch, is a species of scyllid nudibranch, and is found in South Africa. It is a marine gastropod mollusc in the family Scyllaeidae.

== Distribution ==
This species is found around the South African coast from the West coast (Elands Bay) to South coast (Port Elizabeth).

== Description ==
The size of this marine species attains 50 mm.

The dorsal side of the body displays three distinct blue spots. The body is slender and elongated, with two pairs of flattened lobes on either side of the dorsal gills. Translucent gills become visible when in water, along with a posterior dorsal crest. The front of the head has two rhinophores (chemosensory tentacles), each encased in a protective sheath.

Color: Pale orange with darker orange spots on the body and extremities, along with three distinct blue spots on the dorsal surface.
