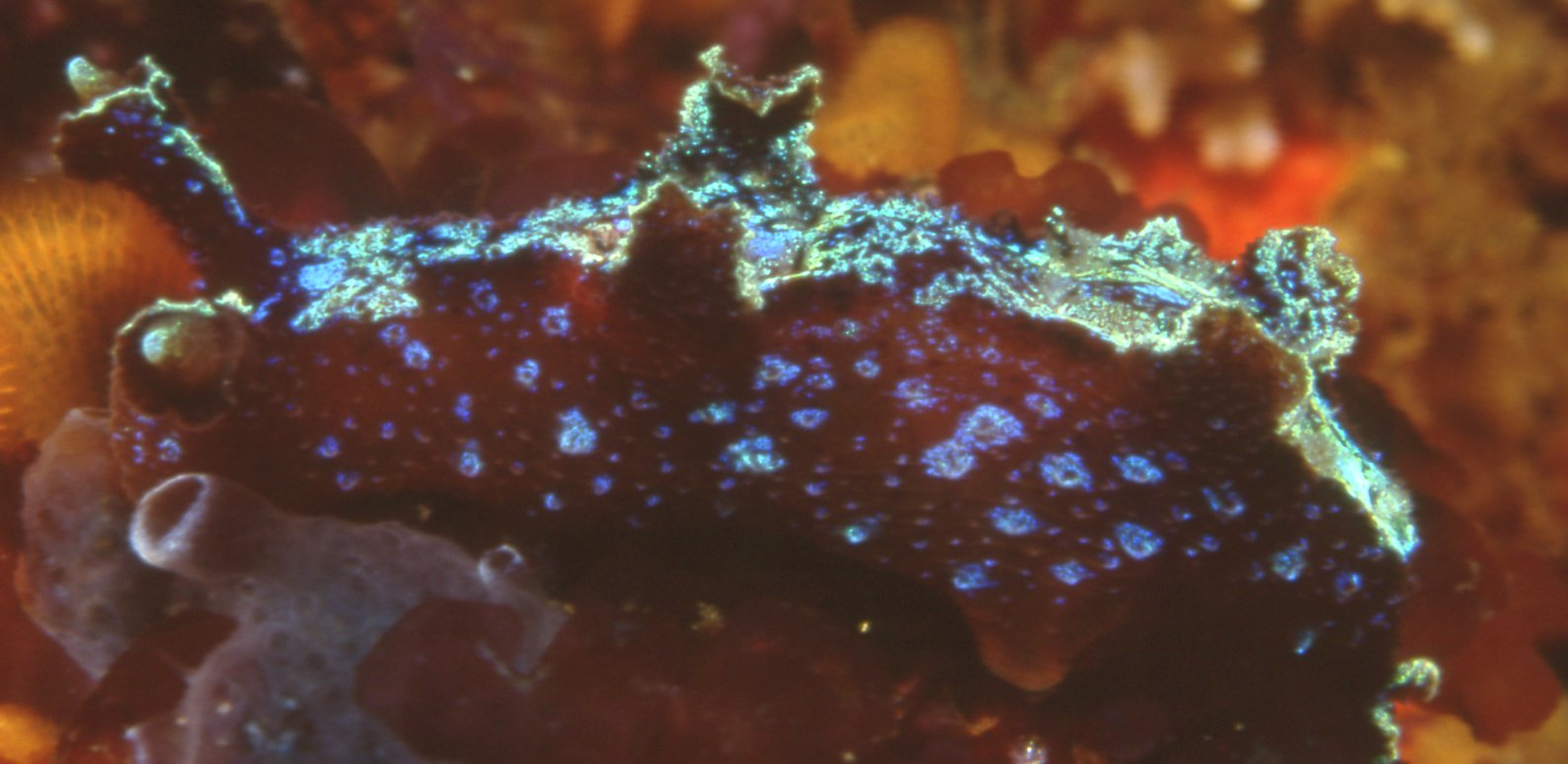

Scientific classification
- Kingdom: Animalia
- Phylum: Mollusca
- Class: Gastropoda
- Order: Nudibranchia
- Suborder: Dendronotacea
- Family: Scyllaeidae
- Genus: Notobryon
- Species: N. wardi

Binomial name
- Notobryon wardi Odhner, 1936

= Notobryon wardi =

Species of gastropod

Notobryon wardi, the iridescent nudibranch, is a species of scyllid nudibranch, and is found in South Africa. It is a marine gastropod mollusc in the family Scyllaeidae.

== Distribution ==
This species is found around the South African coast from Elands Bay to Jeffreys Bay. It is usually found inter-tidally but has been found to 20 m.

== Description ==
Notobryon wardi is a medium-sized (up to 50 mm) smooth-bodied nudibranch. The body is reddish-brown with iridescent blue-green spots on its sides and back. The smooth rhinophores are surrounded by cup-like sheaths. Two sets of wispy gills are flanked by flattened lobes extending from the body.

== Ecology ==
Notobryon wardi feeds on hydroids. It can swim when disturbed using lateral movements of its body.
