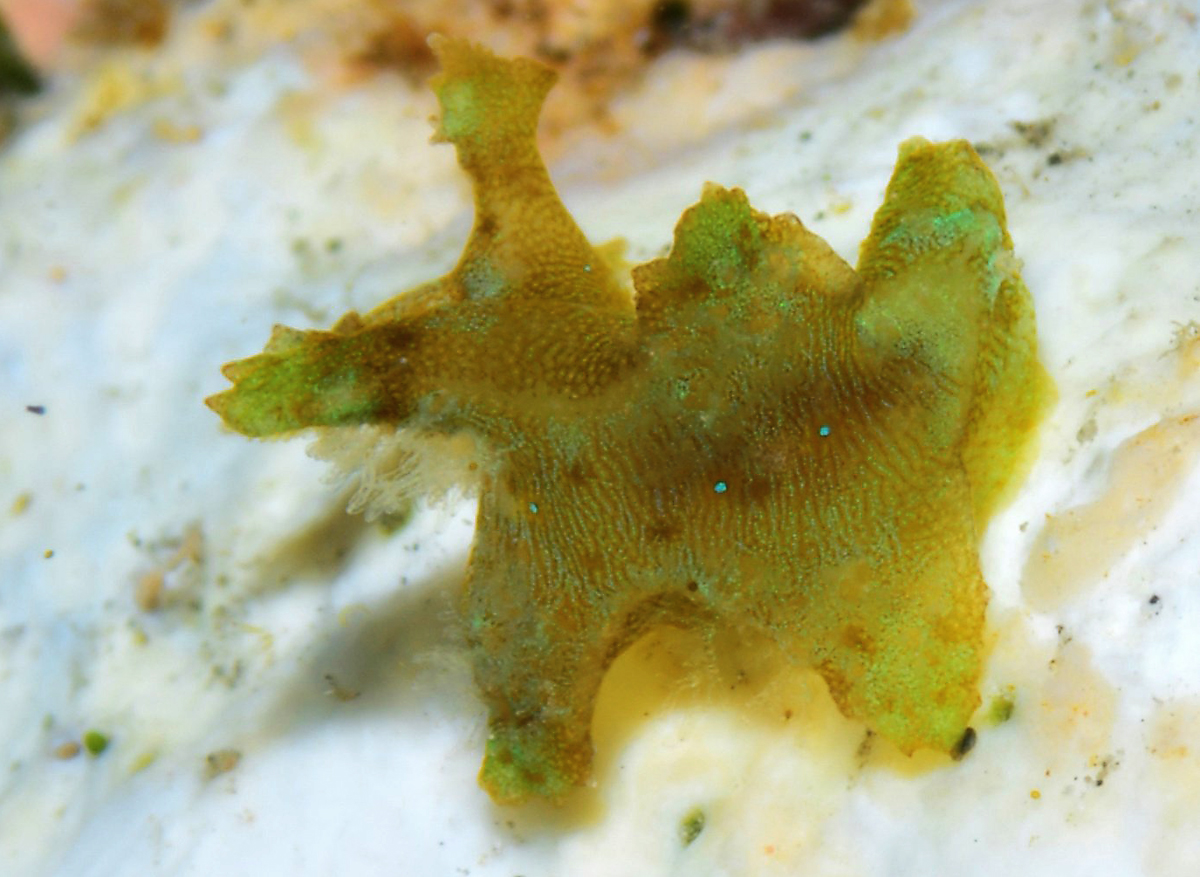

Scientific classification
- Kingdom: Animalia
- Phylum: Mollusca
- Class: Gastropoda
- Order: Nudibranchia
- Suborder: Dendronotacea
- Family: Scyllaeidae
- Genus: Crosslandia; Eliot, 1902

= Crosslandia =

Genus of gastropods

Crosslandia is a genus of sea slugs, in the family Scyllaeidae. Members of this genus inhabit areas such as the Pacific coast of Central America, and the Indo-West Pacific.

== Species ==
- Crosslandia daedali Poorman & Mulliner, 1981
- Crosslandia viridis Eliot, 1902
