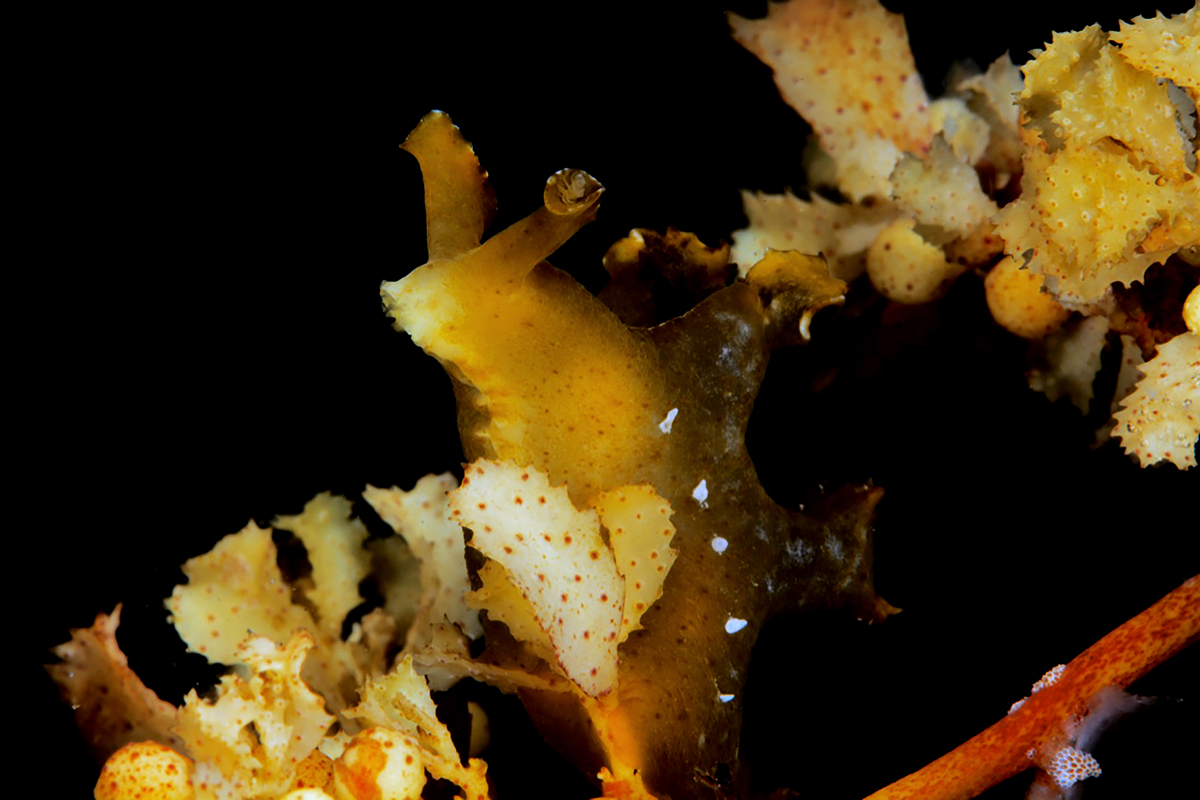
- Scyllaea fulva

Scientific classification
- Domain: Eukaryota
- Kingdom: Animalia
- Phylum: Mollusca
- Class: Gastropoda
- Order: Nudibranchia
- Suborder: Cladobranchia
- Family: Scyllaeidae
- Genus: Scyllaea; Linnaeus, 1758

Synonyms
- Nerea Lesson, 1831

= Scyllaea =

Genus of gastropods

Scyllaea is a genus of nudibranchs. They are marine gastropod molluscs in the family Scyllaeidae.

The slugs live on floating algae like Sargassum, where they have the same color and shape as the alga and can hardly be seen by predators. They feed on hydrozoa growing on the alga.

== Species ==
Species in the genus Scyllaea include

- Scyllaea fulva Quoy & Gaimard, 1824
- Scyllaea pelagica Linnaeus, 1758

Species brought into synonymy

- Scyllaea dracaena Kelaart, 1858: synonym of Scyllaea fulva Quoy & Gaimard, 1824
- Scyllaea edwardsii A. E. Verrill, 1878: synonym of Scyllaea pelagica Linnaeus, 1758
- Scyllaea grayae A. Adams & Reeve, 1850: synonym of Scyllaea pelagica Linnaeus, 1758
- Scyllaea quoyi Gray, 1850: synonym of Scyllaea fulva Quoy & Gaimard, 1824

Nomina dubia

- Scyllaea ghomfodensis Forskål, 1775
- Scyllaea lamyi Vayssière, 1917
