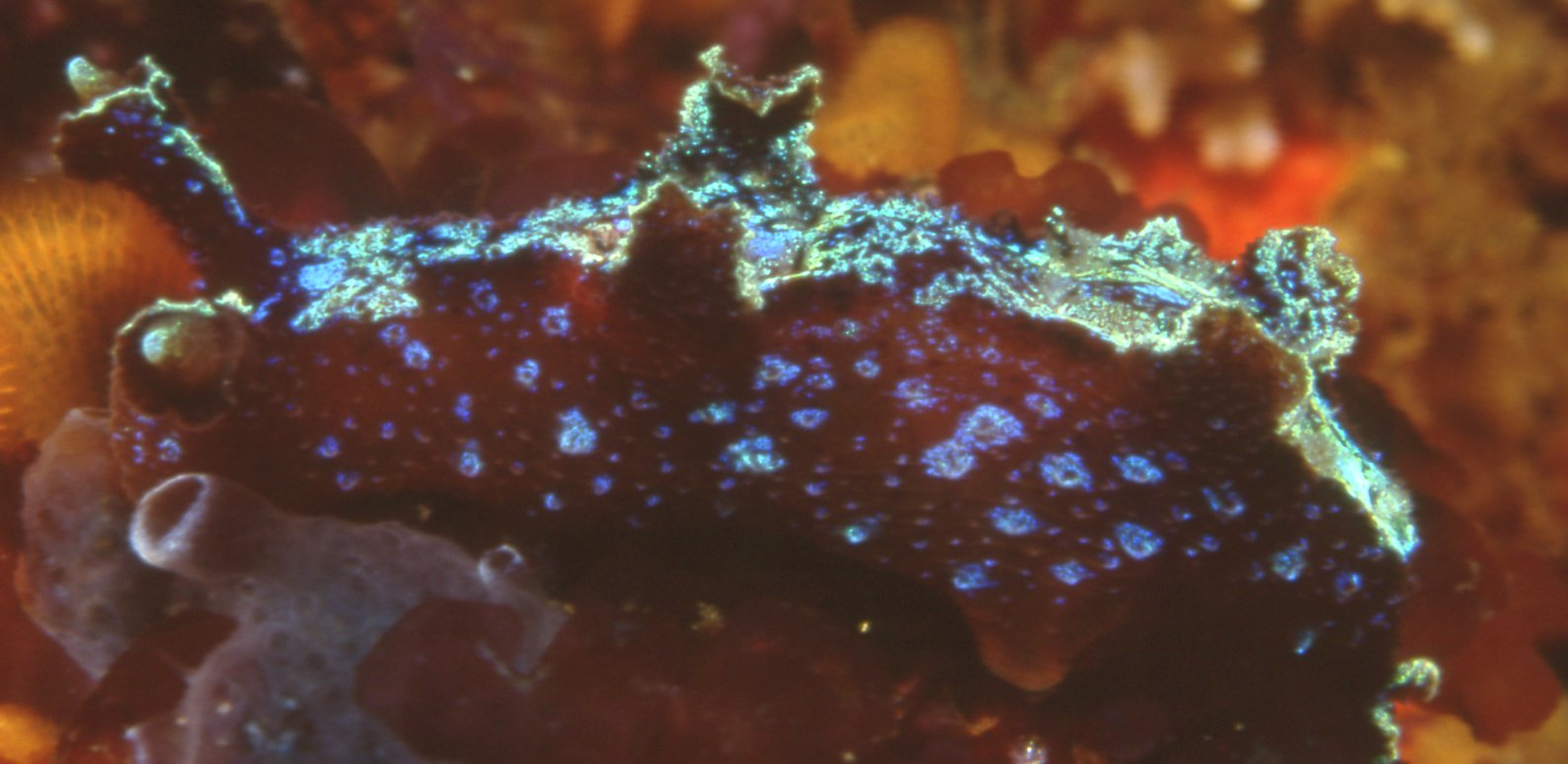

Scientific classification
- Kingdom: Animalia
- Phylum: Mollusca
- Class: Gastropoda
- Order: Nudibranchia
- Suborder: Dendronotacea
- Superfamily: Dendronotoidea
- Family: Scyllaeidae
- Genus: Notobryon; Odhner, 1936

Type species
- Notobryon wardi Odhner, 1936

= Notobryon =

Genus of gastropods

Notobryon is a genus of nudibranchs. They are marine gastropod molluscs in the family Scyllaeidae.

== Species ==
The following species are recognised in the genus Notobryon:

- Notobryon bijecurum Baba, 1937
- Notobryon caribbaeum Caballer & Ortea, 2014
- Notobryon clavigerum Baba, 1937
- Notobryon panamicum Pola, Camacho-Garcia & Gosliner, 2012
- Notobryon thompsoni Pola, Camacho-Garcia & Gosliner, 2012
- Notobryon wardi Odhner, 1936
