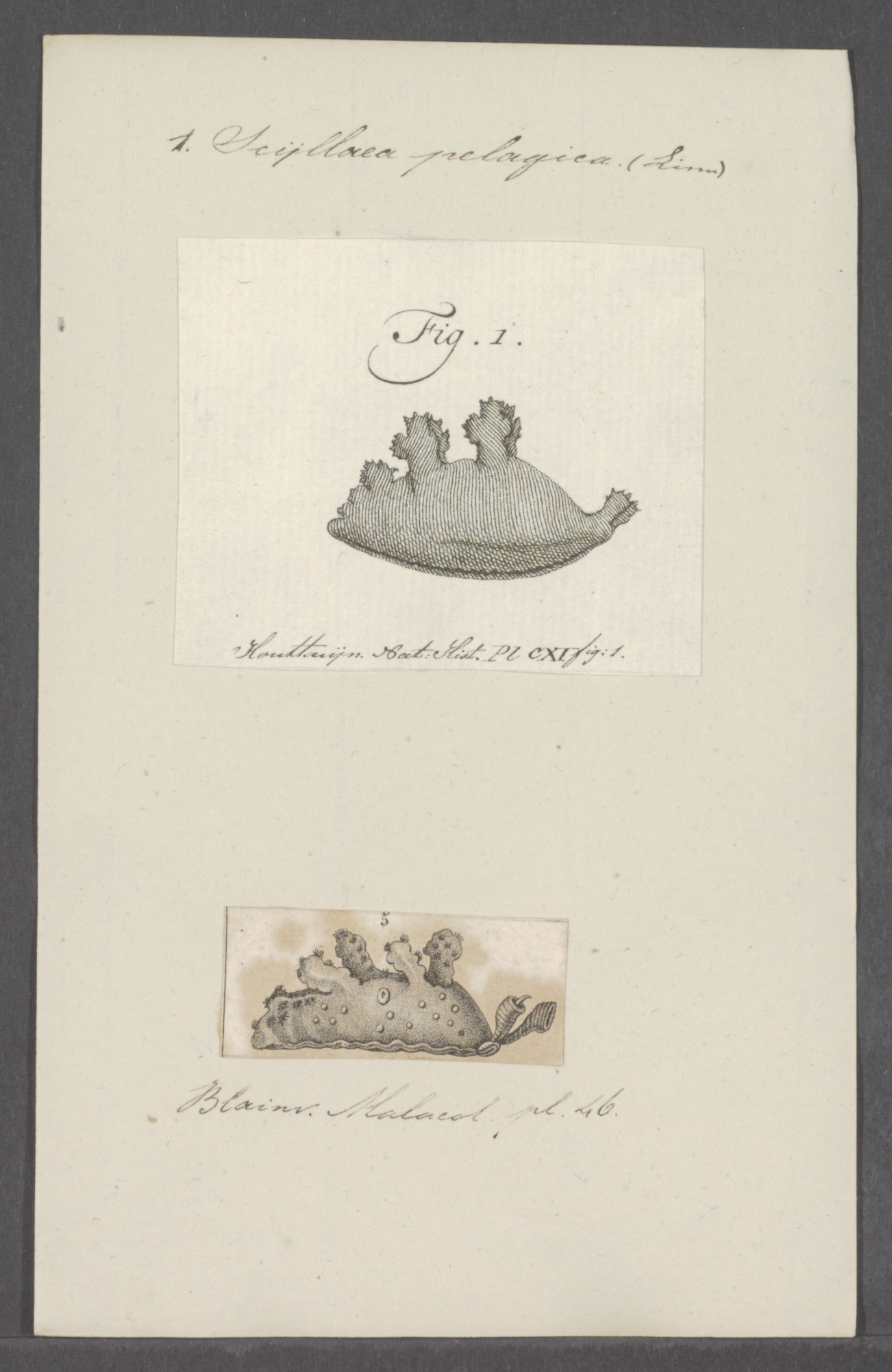

Scientific classification
- Kingdom: Animalia
- Phylum: Mollusca
- Class: Gastropoda
- Order: Nudibranchia
- Suborder: Cladobranchia
- Family: Scyllaeidae
- Genus: Scyllaea
- Species: S. pelagica

Binomial name
- Scyllaea pelagica Linnaeus, 1758

Synonyms
- Scyllaea edwardsii A. E. Verrill, 1878; Scyllaea grayae A. Adams & Reeve, 1850; Scyllaea pelagica var. marginata Bergh, 1871

= Scyllaea pelagica =

Species of gastropod

Scyllaea pelagica, common name the sargassum nudibranch, is a species of nudibranch, a marine gastropod mollusc in the family Scyllaeidae. This species lives among floating seaweed in the world's oceans, feeding on hydroids.

== Description ==
Scyllaea pelagica is a sturdy nudibranch that grows to a length of about 10 cm (4 in). It is dorso-ventrally flattened. At the anterior end there are two pairs of sensory tentacles and a pair of rhinophores enclosed in large rhinophore sheaths. On the sides of the body are two pairs of irregular lobes with toothed edges and squared ends known as cerata. The inner surfaces of these bear numerous small gills. At the posterior end of the body there is a flattened dorsal crest. The skin is smooth except for a few conical tubercles. The colour is a dull yellowish-brown or greenish-brown with some small white markings. Sometimes there is a row of tiny bright blue spots along each side.

== Distribution ==
Scyllaea pelagica occurs globally in pantropical oceans among floating masses of weed. It is especially common in the Caribbean area and Gulf of Mexico and it often gets washed up onto the beach with seaweed after storms.

== Biology ==
Scyllaea pelagica is nearly always a pelagic species but is occasionally found on brown seaweed anchored to the seabed. It spends its life among sargasso weed (Sargassum spp.) floating in tropical seas where it is well camouflaged. It feeds by grazing on the hydroids that grow on the weed and if it gets detached from the fronds can swim to a limited extent by flexing its body.

Scyllaea pelagica is a hermaphrodite. Two individuals come together to exchange sperm through their genital openings and fertilisation is internal. The eggs are laid in a jelly coated mass on the weed and the trochophore larvae are planktonic. Studies using radioactive carbon labelling have shown that in nutrient-poor waters such as the Sargasso Sea, the larvae of Scyllaea pelagica can directly incorporate into their epidermis and cerata, amino acids that have been added to the water.
