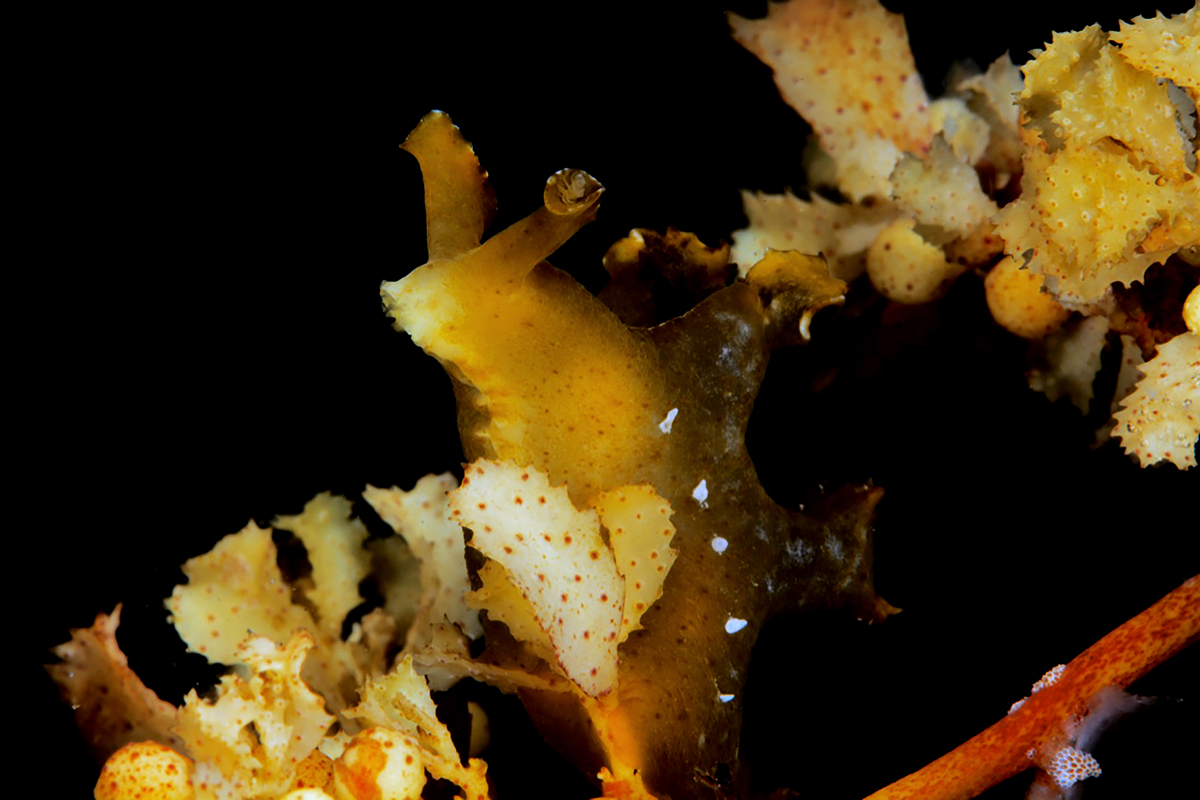
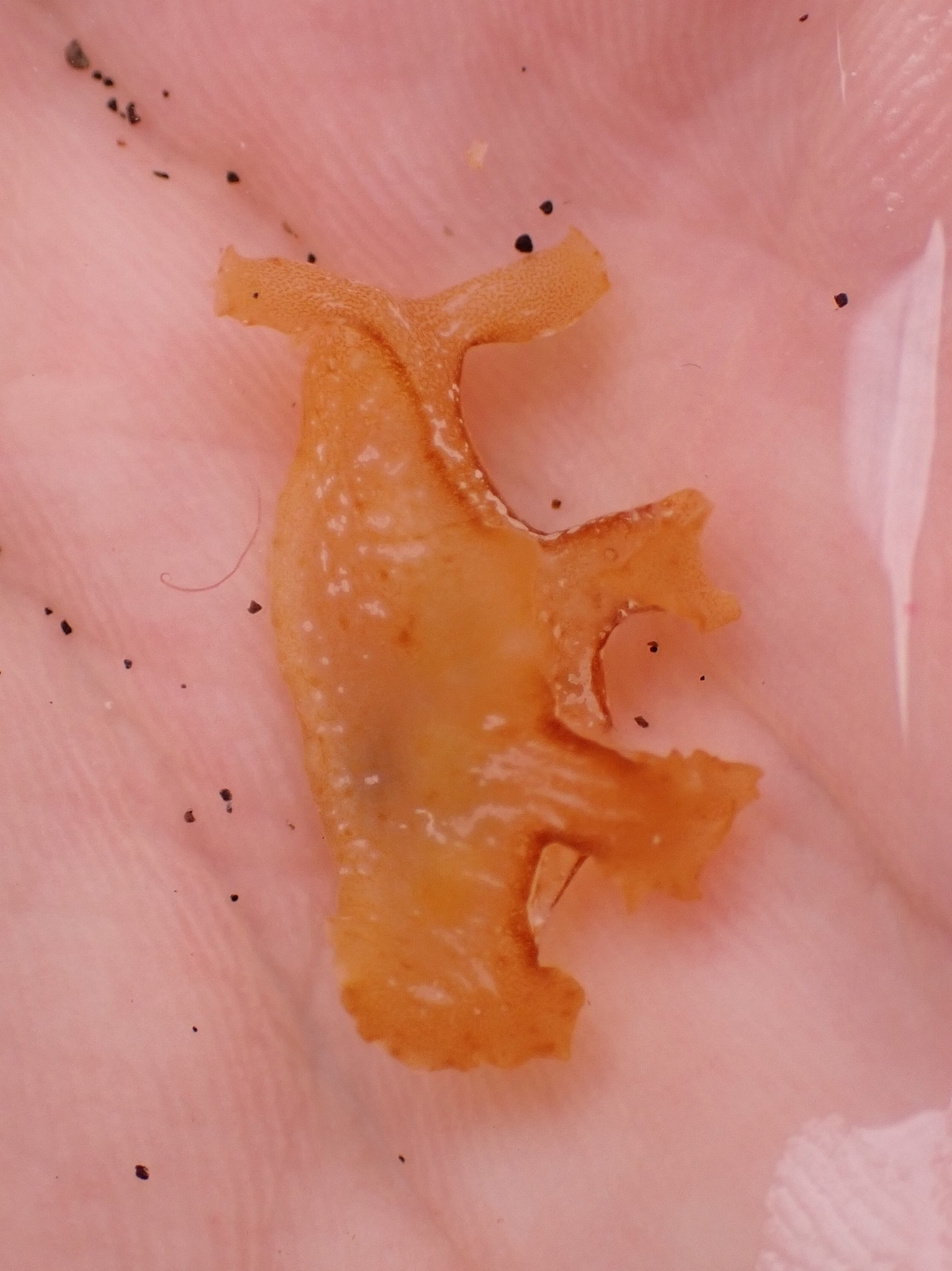
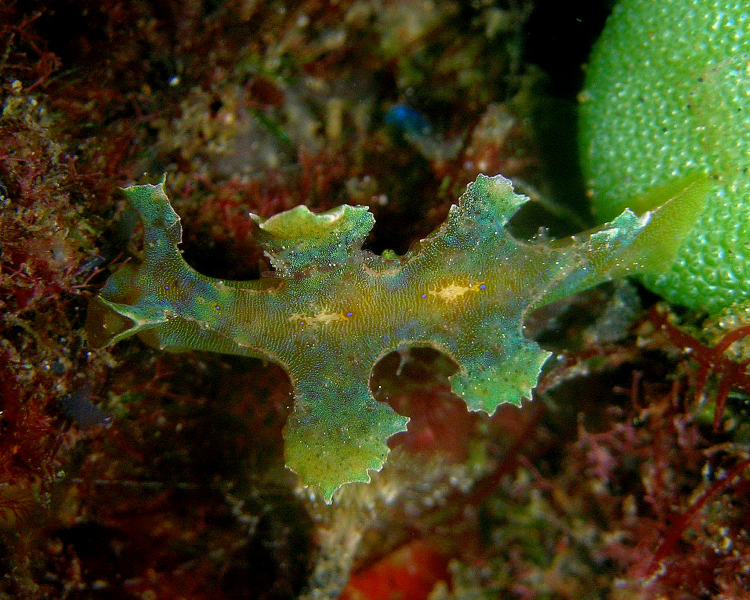
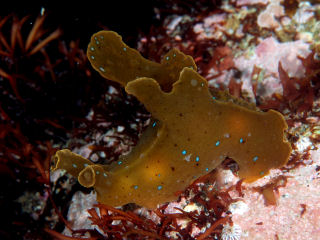
- From left to right in each row, from top to bottom: Scyllaea fulva, Scyllaea pelagica, Notobryon wardi, and Crosslandia viridis

Scientific classification
- Kingdom: Animalia
- Phylum: Mollusca
- Class: Gastropoda
- Order: Nudibranchia
- Suborder: Dendronotacea
- Superfamily: Dendronotoidea
- Family: Scyllaeidae; Alder & Hancock, 1855

Type genus
- Scyllaea Linnaeus, 1758

Genera
- See Genera

= Scyllaeidae =

Family of gastropods

Scyllaeidae is a family of nudibranchs, shell-less marine gastropod molluscs or sea slugs, in the superfamily Dendronotoidea. Members of the family are in general cryptic, often resembling algae in their natural environment.

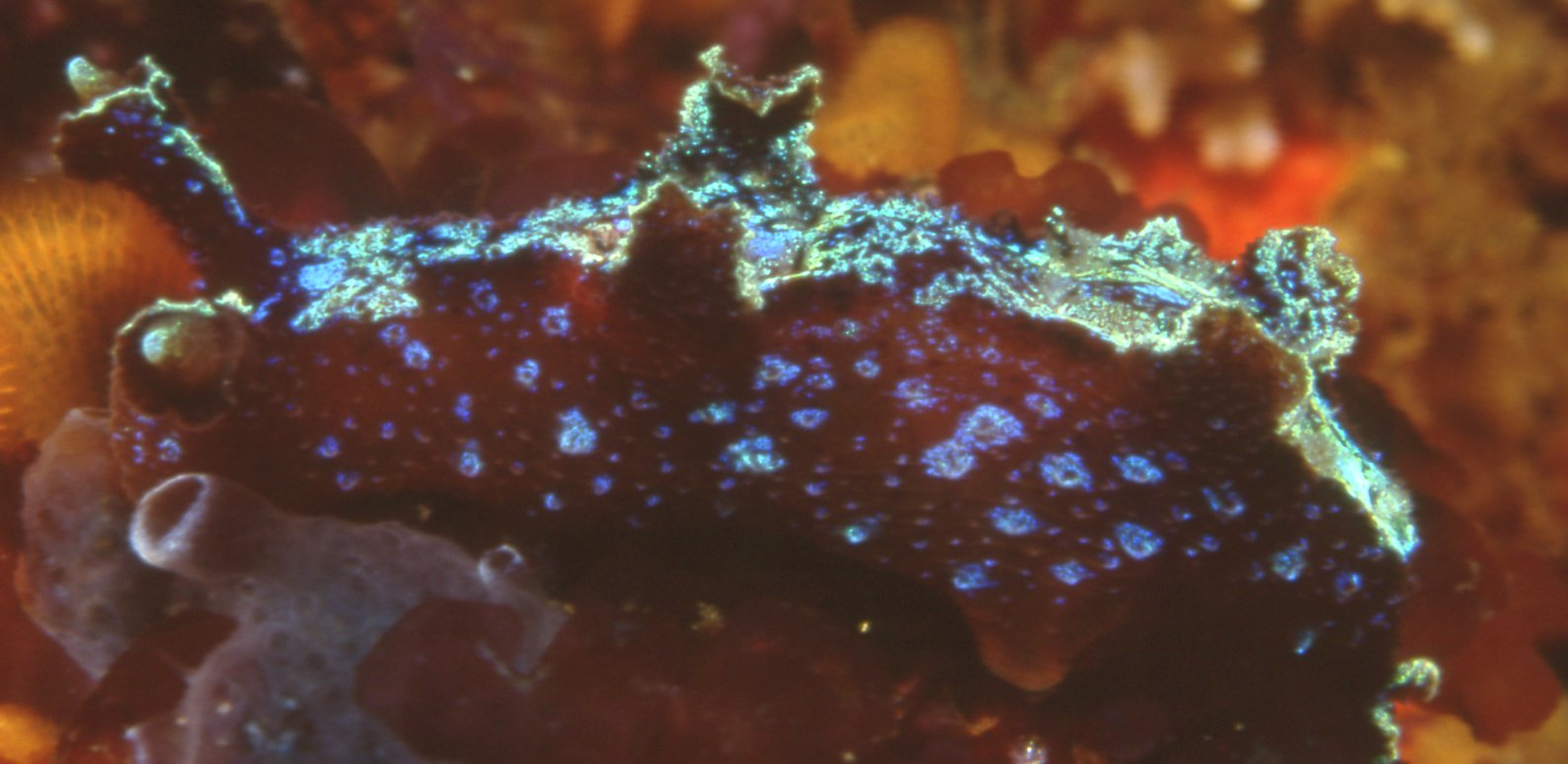
Live individual of Notobryon wardi displaying iridescence

== Genera ==
The following genera are recognised in the family Scyllaeidae:

- Crosslandia Eliot, 1902
- Notobryon Odhner, 1936
- Scyllaea Linnaeus, 1758
