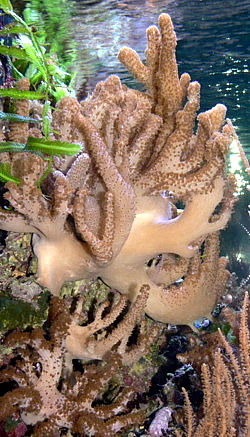
- Cladiella sp.

Scientific classification
- Kingdom: Animalia
- Phylum: Cnidaria
- Subphylum: Anthozoa
- Class: Octocorallia
- Order: Alcyonacea; Lamouroux, 1812

Suborders
- See text

Synonyms
- Gorgonacea

= Alcyonacea =

Soft coral

Order of octocorals that do not produce massive calcium carbonate skeletons

Alcyonacea (synonyms: Alcyonaria, Alcyonarida), in English soft corals or alcyonacians, is a former order (or suborder) of Octocorallia. Since a 2022 revision of Octocorallia, the content of Alcyonacea has been included in the order Malacalcyonacea and, to a lesser extent, in the order Scleralcyonacea, these two new orders now making up the order Octocorallia.

== Definition of the order ==
There are three basic ways of delimiting the order Alcyonacea:

- It some systems it corresponds to what is called suborder Alcyoniina in other systems (see the system stated below in this article for Alcyoniina).
- In other systems, it includes not only the Alcyoniina, but also the taxa Stolonifera, Telestacea (included in Stolonifera by some authors) and Protoalcyonaria, which are classified as separate orders by other authors.
- In the broadest sense, it includes not only the Alcyoniina, Stolonifera, Telestacea and Protoalcyonaria, but also the taxa (suborders) Scleraxonia, Holaxonia and Calcaxonia (former name: "restricted Holaxonia"), which, in other systems (and in all systems before 1981), were together classified as the separate order Gorgonacea (synonyms: Gorgonarida, Gorgonaria), in English called gorgonians or sea fans (and sea whips). This definition of Alcyonacea is also used in the following text of this article.

The following text should be considered a historical, outdated way of treating the taxonomy of Anthozoa and Octocorallia.

== Introduction ==
Alcyonacea are sessile colonial cnidarians that are found throughout the oceans of the world, especially in the deep sea, polar waters, tropics and subtropics. Whilst not in a strict taxonomic sense, Alcyonacea are commonly known as soft corals. The term "soft coral" generally applies to organisms in the two orders Pennatulacea and Alcyonacea with their polyps embedded within a fleshy mass of coenenchymal tissue. Consequently, the term "gorgonian coral" is commonly handed to multiple species in the order Alcyonacea that produce a mineralized skeletal axis (or axial-like layer) composed of calcite and the proteinaceous material gorgonin only and corresponds to only one of several families within the formally accepted taxon Gorgoniidae (Scleractinia). These can be found in order Malacalcyonacea (taxonomic synonyms of include (unaccepted): Alcyoniina, Holaxonia, Protoalcyonaria, Scleraxonia, and Stolonifera.

Common names for subsets of this order are sea fans and sea whips; others are similar to the sea pens of related order Pennatulacea. Individual tiny polyps form colonies that are normally erect, flattened, branching, and reminiscent of a fan. Others may be whiplike, bushy, or even encrusting. A colony can be several feet high and across, but only a few inches thick. They may be brightly coloured, often purple, red, or yellow. Photosynthetic gorgonians can be successfully kept in captive aquaria.

About 500 different species of gorgonians are found in the oceans of the world, but they are particularly abundant in the shallow waters of the Western Atlantic, including Florida, Bermuda, and the West Indies.

== Anatomy ==
The structure of a gorgonian colony varies. In the suborder Holaxonia, skeletons are formed from a flexible, horny substance called gorgonin. The suborder Scleraxonia species are supported by a skeleton of tightly grouped calcareous spicules. Also, some species encrust like coral.

Measurements of the gorgonin and calcite within several long-lived species of gorgonians can be useful in paleoclimatology and paleoceanography, as their skeletal growth rate and composition are highly correlated with seasonal and climatic variation.

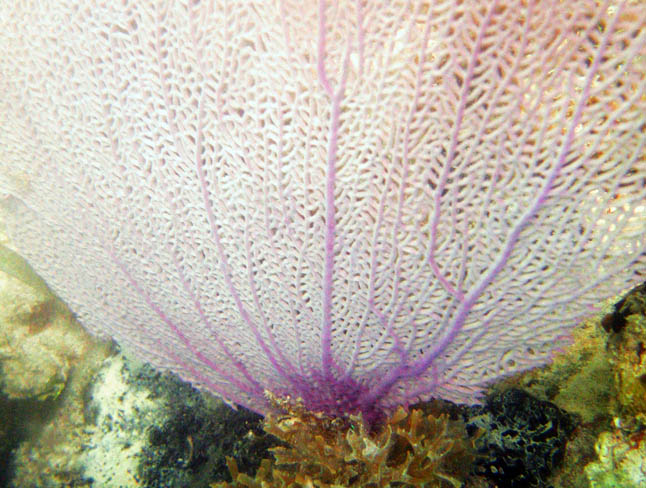
Venus fan (Gorgonia flabellum), Caribbean Sea at Goat Bay (Bahía de la Chiva) on Vieques Island, Puerto Rico

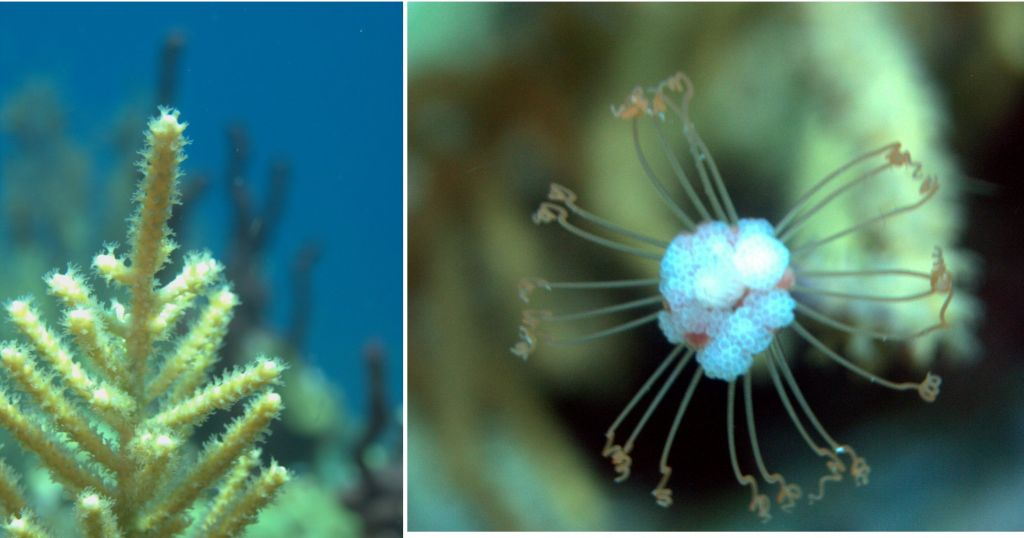
Gorgonian with reproductive stage, Caribbean Sea at Cabrits National Park, Dominica

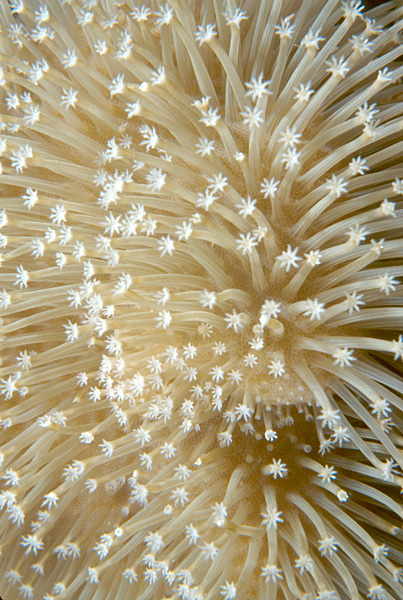
A close-up of an alcyonacean showing individual polyps

== Features ==
Soft corals contain minute, spiny skeletal elements called sclerites, useful in species identification. Sclerites give these corals some degree of support and give their flesh a spiky, grainy texture that deters predators. In the past, soft corals were thought to be unable to lay new foundations for future corals, but recent findings suggest that colonies of the leather-coral genus Sinularia are able to cement sclerites and consolidate them at their base into alcyonarian spiculite, thus making them reef builders.

Unlike stony corals, most soft corals thrive in nutrient-rich waters with less intense light. Almost all use symbiotic photosynthetic zooxanthella as a major energy source. However, most readily eat any free-floating food, such as zooplankton, out of the water column. They are integral members of the reef ecosystem and provide habitat for fish, snails, algae, and a diversity of other marine species.

Despite being dominated by "soft corals", the order Alcyonacea now contains all species known as "gorgonian corals", that produce a hard skeleton made from gorgonin, a protein unique to the group that makes their skeletons quite different from "true" corals (Scleractinia). These "gorgonion corals" can be found in suborders Holaxonia, Scleraxonia, and Stolonifera.

Many soft corals are easily collected in the wild for the reef aquarium hobby, as small cuttings are less prone to infection or damage during shipping than stony corals. Nevertheless, home-grown specimens tend to be more adaptable to aquarium life and help conserve wild reefs. Soft corals grow quickly in captivity and are easily divided into new individuals, and so those grown by aquaculture are often hardier and less expensive than imported corals from the wild.

== Ecology ==
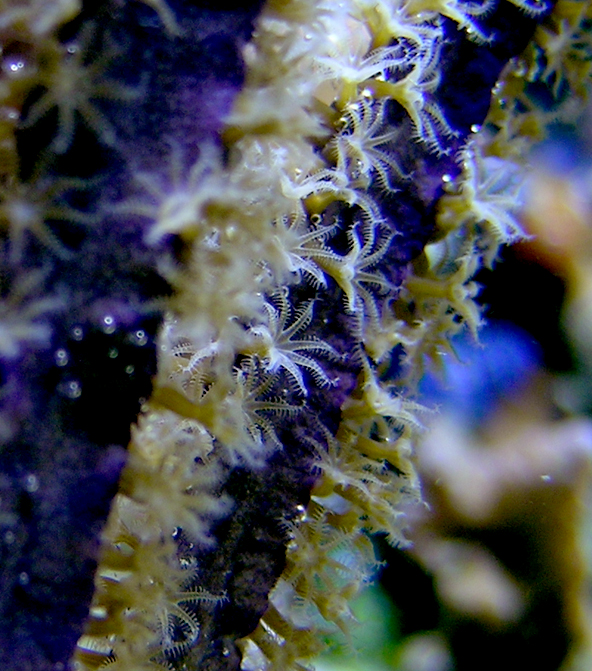
Purple sea whip gorgonian

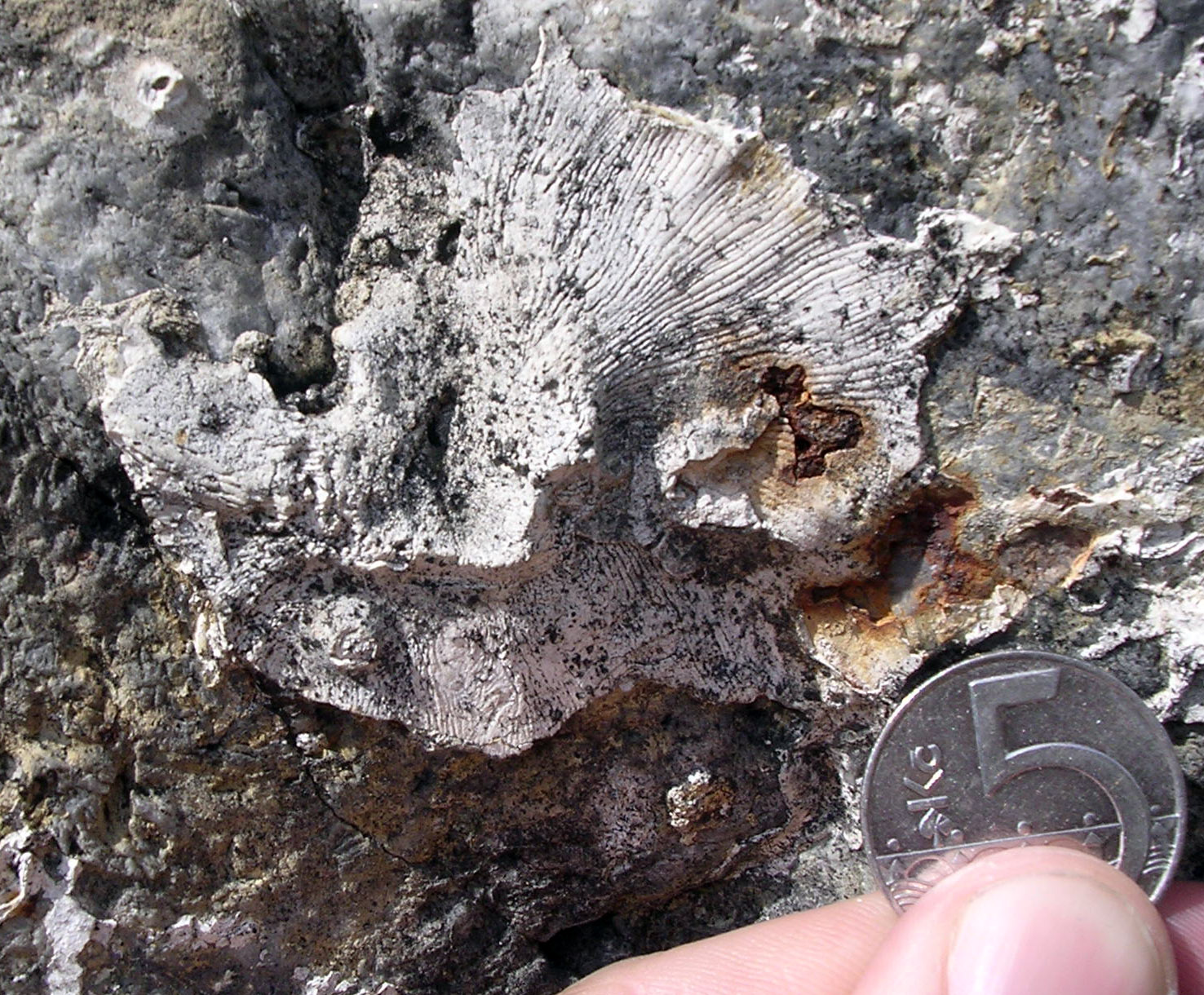
Fossil gorgonian holdfast on a Miocene limestone surface, Czech Republic

Each gorgonian polyp has eight tentacles, which catch plankton and particulate matter for consumption. This process, called filter feeding, is facilitated when the "fan" is oriented across the prevailing current to maximise water flow to the gorgonian, hence food supply.

Some gorgonians contain algae, or zooxanthellae. This symbiotic relationship assists in giving the gorgonian nutrition by photosynthesis. Gorgonians possessing zooxanthellae are usually characterized by brownish polyps.

Gorgonians are found primarily in shallow waters, though some have been found at depths of several thousand feet. The size, shape, and appearance of gorgonians can be correlated with their location. The more fan-shaped and flexible gorgonians tend to populate shallower areas with strong currents, while the taller, thinner, and stiffer gorgonians can be found in deeper, calmer waters.

Other fauna, such as hydrozoa, bryozoa, and brittle stars, are known to dwell within the branches of gorgonian colonies. The pygmy seahorse not only makes certain species of gorgonians its home, but also closely resembles its host, thus is well camouflaged. Two species of pygmy seahorse, Hippocampus bargibanti and Hippocampus denise, are obligate residents on gorgonians. H. bargibanti is limited to two species in the single genus Muricella.

Gorgonians produce unusual organic compounds in their tissues, particularly diterpenes, and some of these are important candidates for new drugs. These compounds may be part of the chemical defenses produced by gorgonians to render their tissue distasteful to potential predators. Bottlenose dolphins in the Red Sea have been observed swimming against these tissues, in what is thought to be an attempt to take advantage of the antimicrobial qualities of diterpenes. Despite these chemical defenses, the tissues of gorgonians are prey for flamingo tongue snails of the genus Cyphoma, nudibranchs, the fireworm Hermodice spp., and their polyps are food for butterflyfishes. Amongst the nudibranchs which feed on soft corals and sea fans are the Tritoniidae and the genus Phyllodesmium which specialises in eating Xenia species.

== Suborders and families ==
The World Register of Marine Species listed these suborders and families in 2018:

- suborder Alcyoniina
  - family Acrophytidae McFadden & Ofwegen, 2017
  - family Alcyoniidae Lamouroux, 1812
  - family Aquaumbridae Breedy, van Ofwegen & Vargas, 2012
  - family Corymbophytidae McFadden & Ofwegen, 2017
  - family Leptophytidae McFadden & Ofwegen, 2017
  - family Nephtheidae Gray, 1862
  - family Nidaliidae Gray, 1869
  - family Paralcyoniidae Gray, 1869
  - family Xeniidae Ehrenberg, 1828
- suborder Calcaxonia
  - family Chrysogorgiidae Verrill, 1883
  - family Ellisellidae Gray, 1859
  - family Ifalukellidae Bayer, 1955
  - family Isididae Lamouroux, 1812
  - family Primnoidae Milne Edwards, 1857
- suborder Holaxonia
  - family Acanthogorgiidae Gray, 1859
  - family Dendrobrachiidae Brook, 1889
  - family Gorgoniidae Lamouroux, 1812
  - family Keroeididae Kinoshita, 1910
  - family Plexauridae Gray, 1859
- suborder Protoalcyonaria
  - family Taiaroidae Bayer & Muzik, 1976
- suborder Scleraxonia
  - family Anthothelidae Broch, 1916
  - family Briareidae Gray, 1859
  - family Coralliidae Lamouroux, 1812
  - family Melithaeidae Gray, 1870
  - family Paragorgiidae Kükenthal, 1916
  - family Parisididae Aurivillius, 1931
  - family Spongiodermidae Wright & Studer, 1889
  - family Subergorgiidae Gray, 1859
  - family Victorgorgiidae Moore, Alderslade & Miller, 2017
- suborder Stolonifera (including Telestacea)
  - family Acrossotidae Bourne, 1914
  - family Arulidae McFadden & van Ofwegen, 2012
  - family Clavulariidae Hickson, 1894
  - family Coelogorgiidae Bourne, 1900
  - family Cornulariidae Dana, 1846
  - family Pseudogorgiidae Utinomi & Harada, 1973
  - family Tubiporidae Ehrenberg, 1828
- family Acanthoaxiidae van Ofwegen & McFadden, 2010
- family Haimeidae Wright, 1865
- family Paramuriceidae Bayer, 1956
- family Parasphaerascleridae McFadden & van Ofwegen, 2013
- family Viguieriotidae
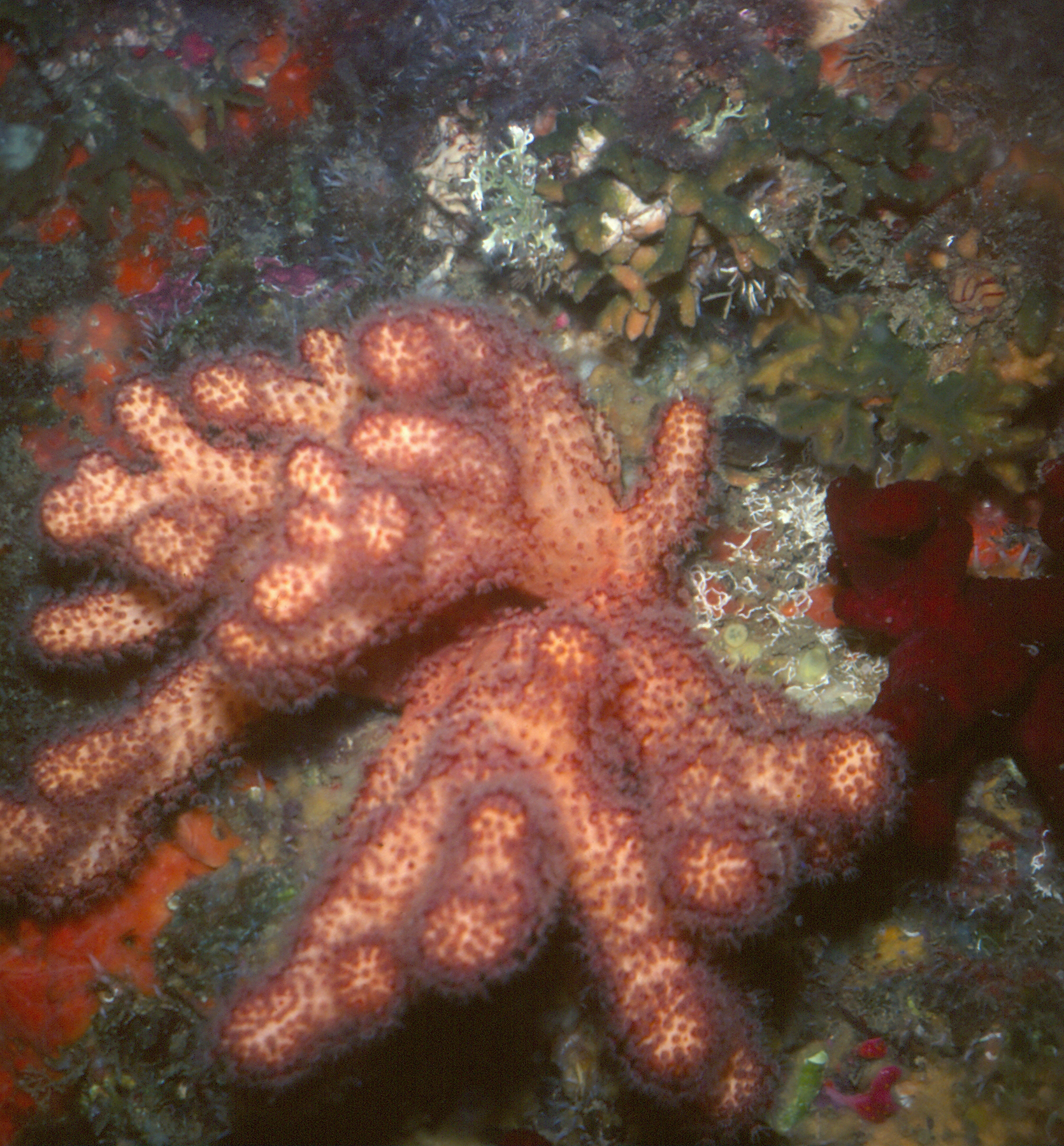
Alcyonium acaule, an alcyoniid

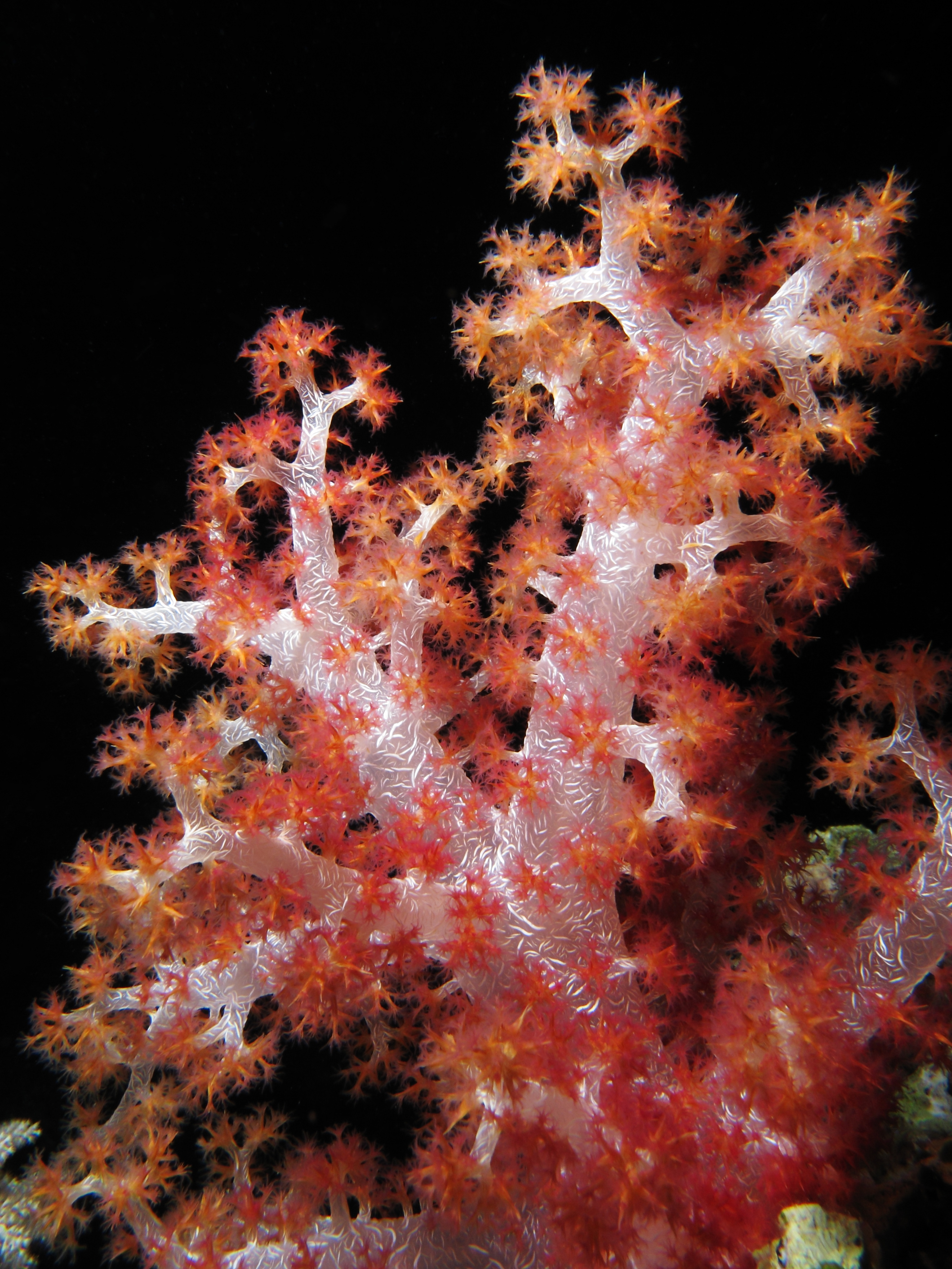
Dendronephthya hemprichi, a nephtheid

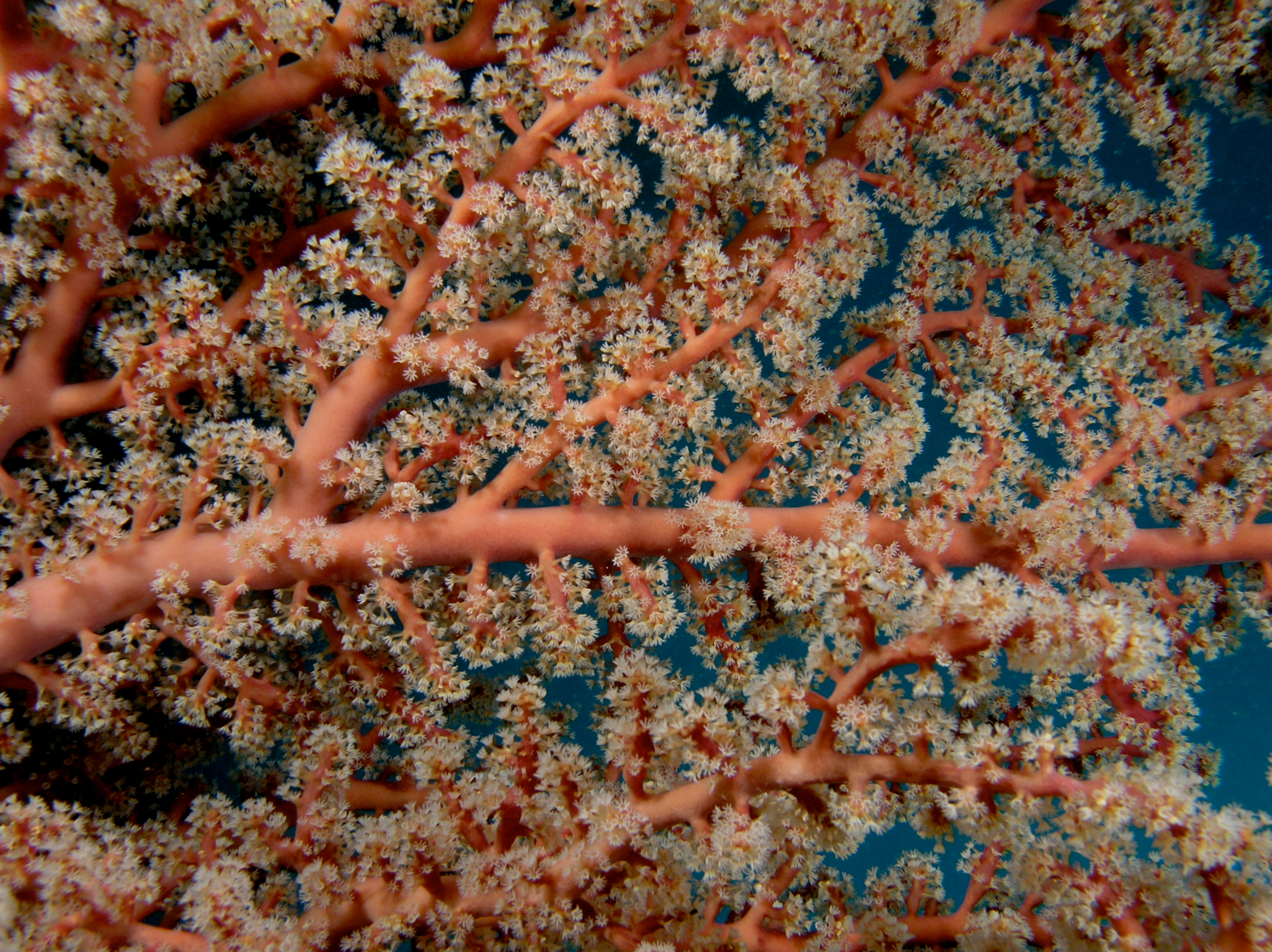
Siphonogorgia godeffroyi, a nidaliid

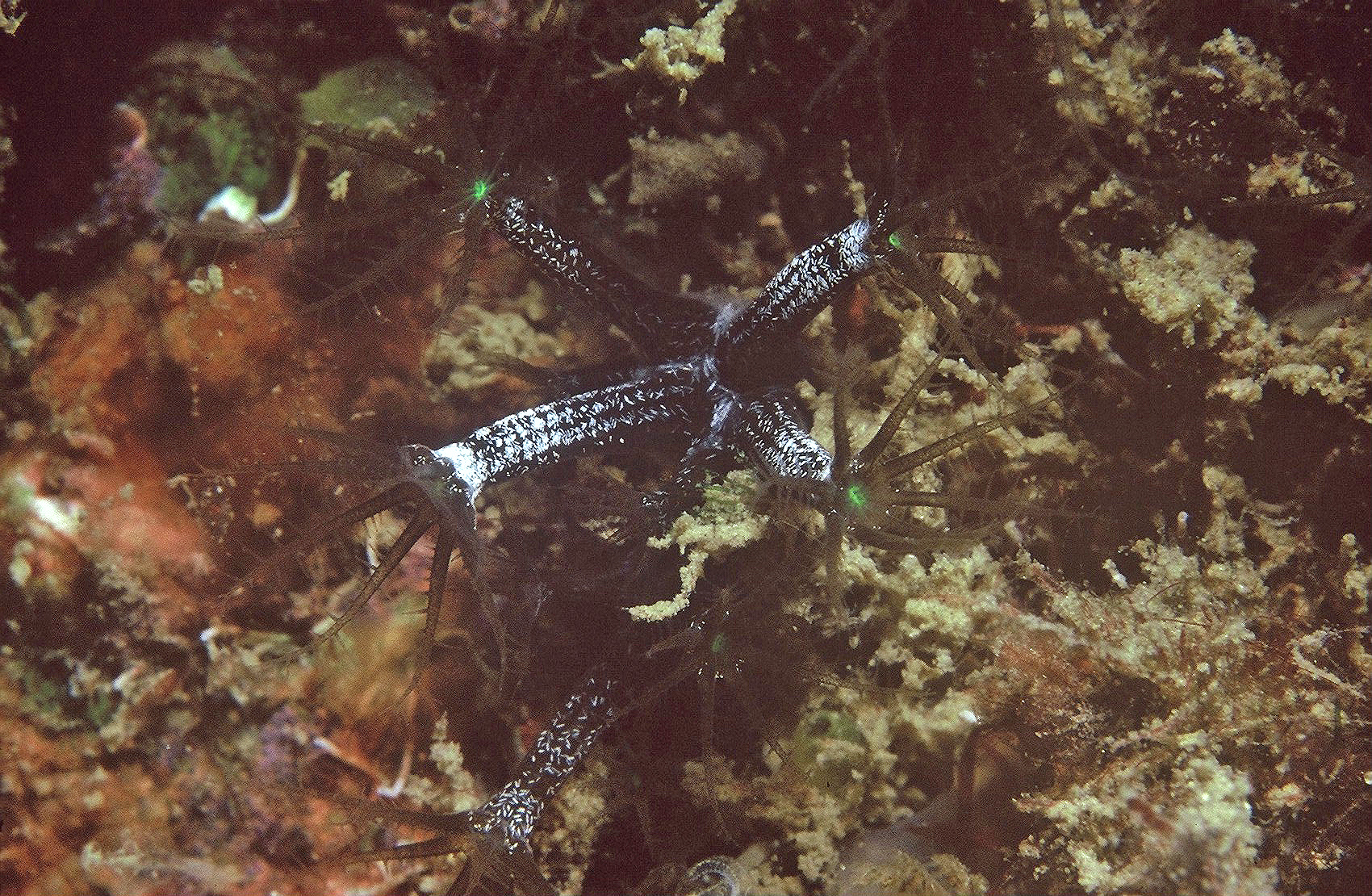
Maasella edwardsi, a paralcyoniid

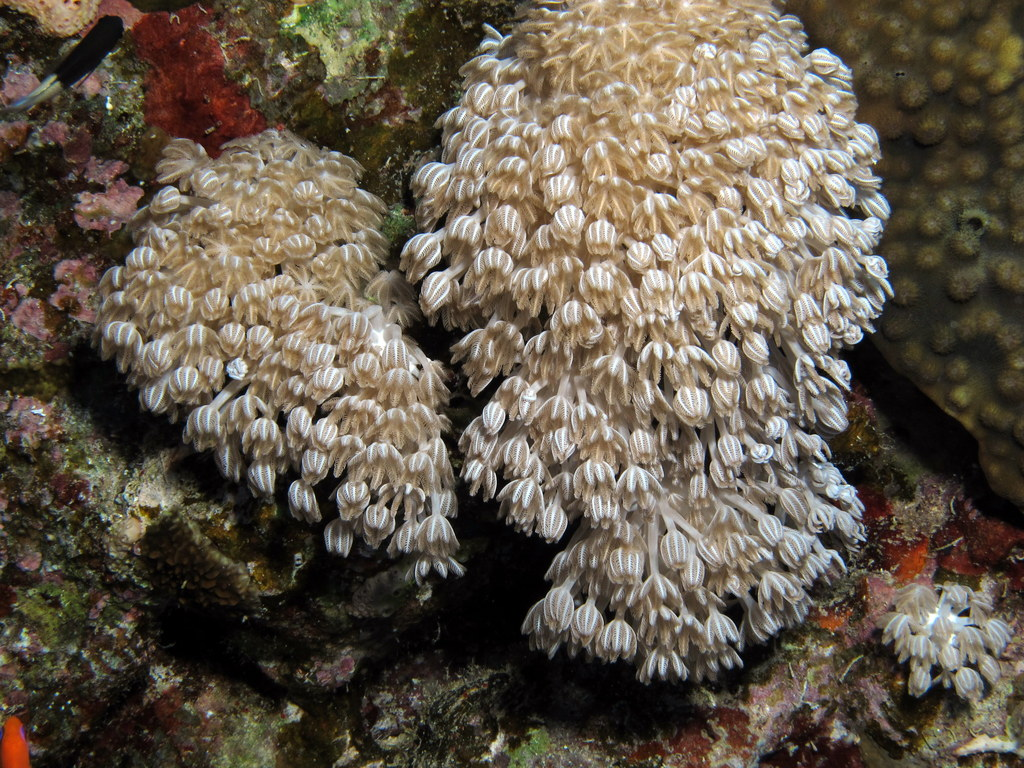
Heteroxenia fuscescens, a xeniid

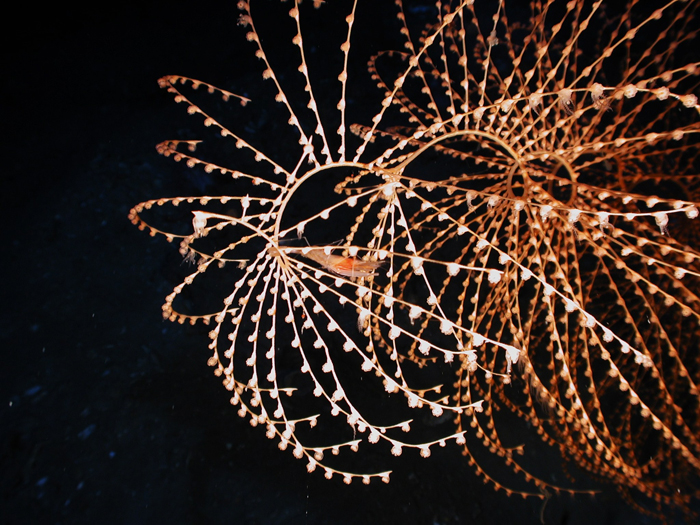
Iridigorgia sp., a chrysogorgiid

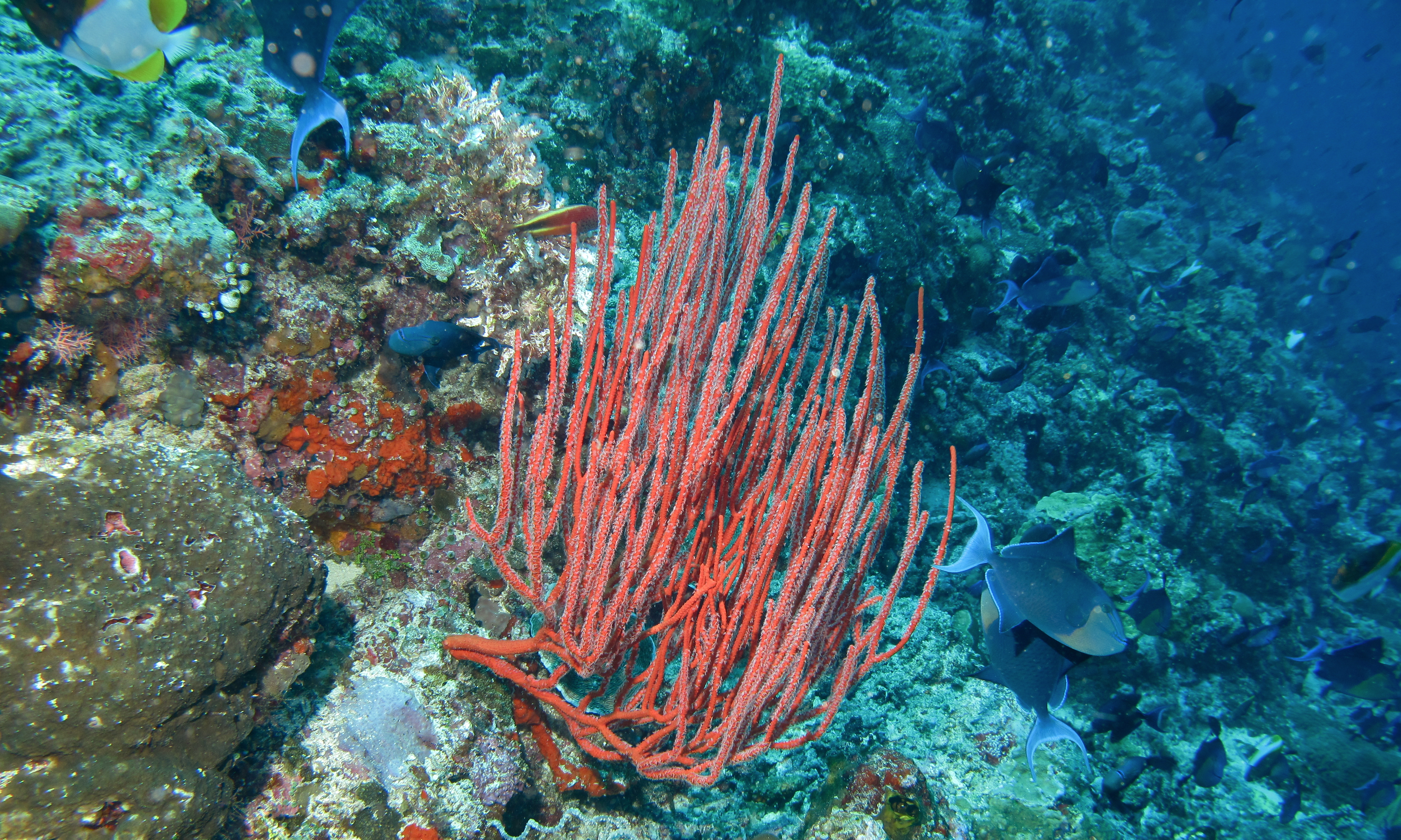
Ellisella sp., an ellisellid

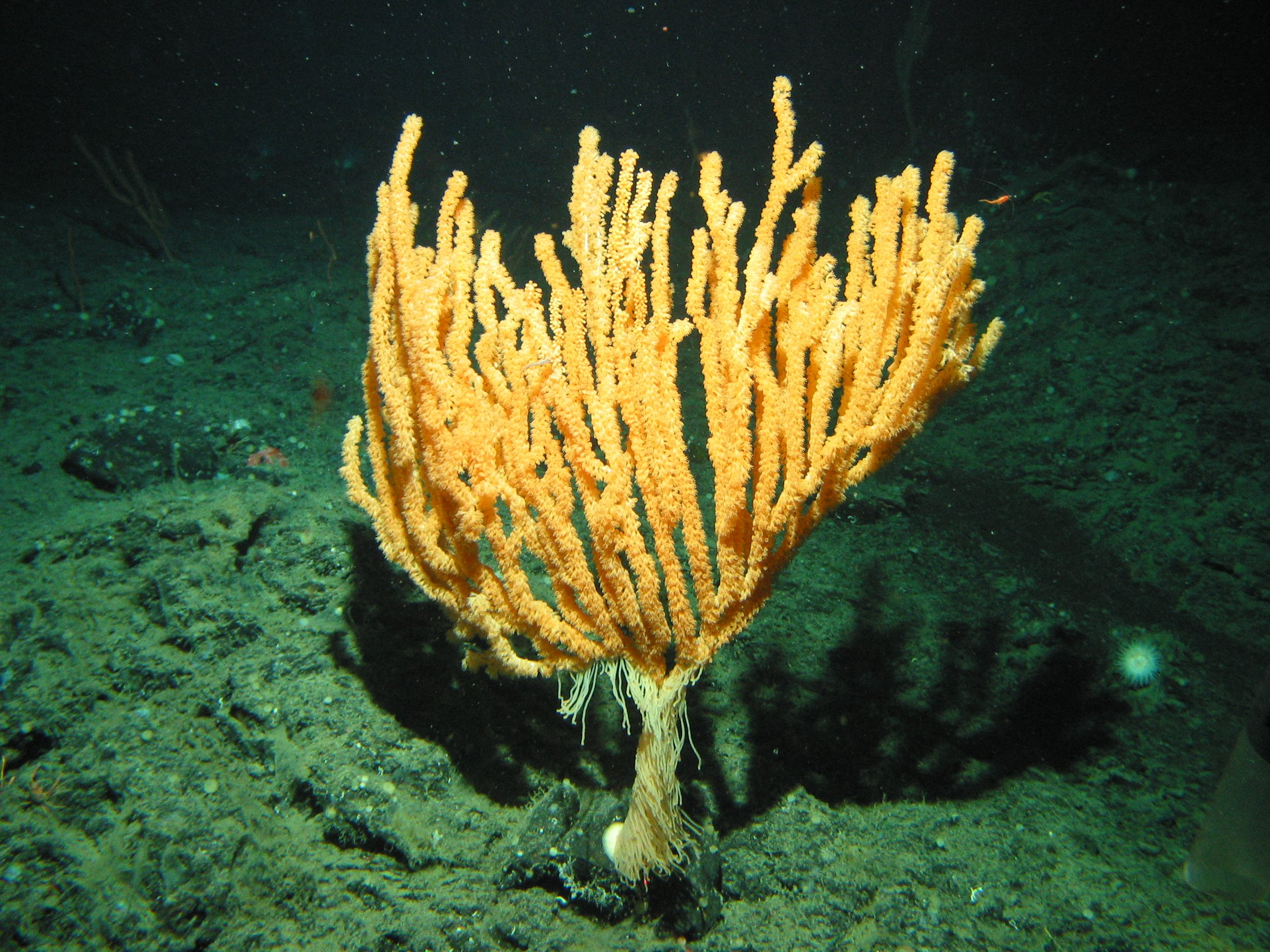
Isidella tentaculum, an isidid

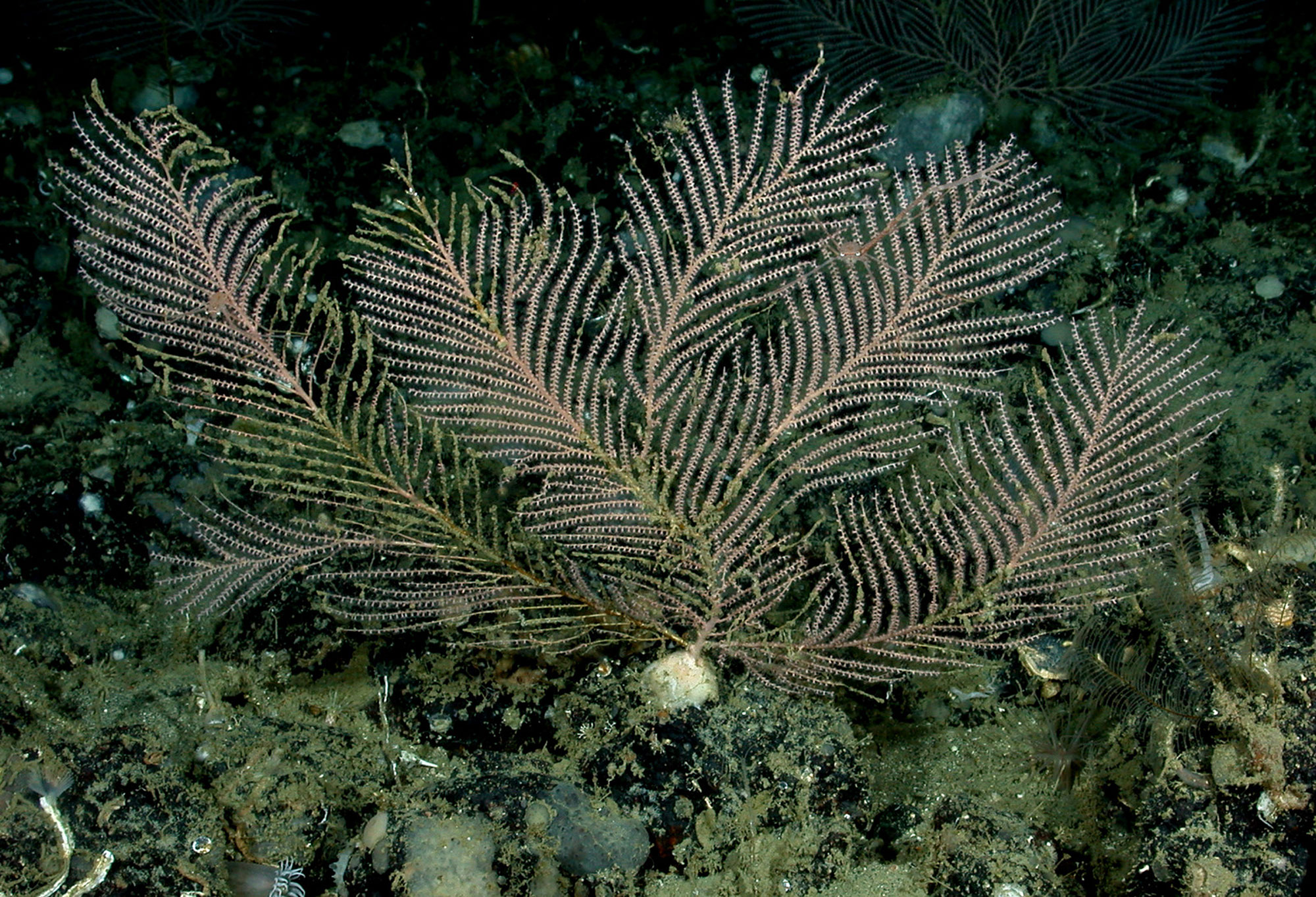
Plumarella pellucida, a primnoid

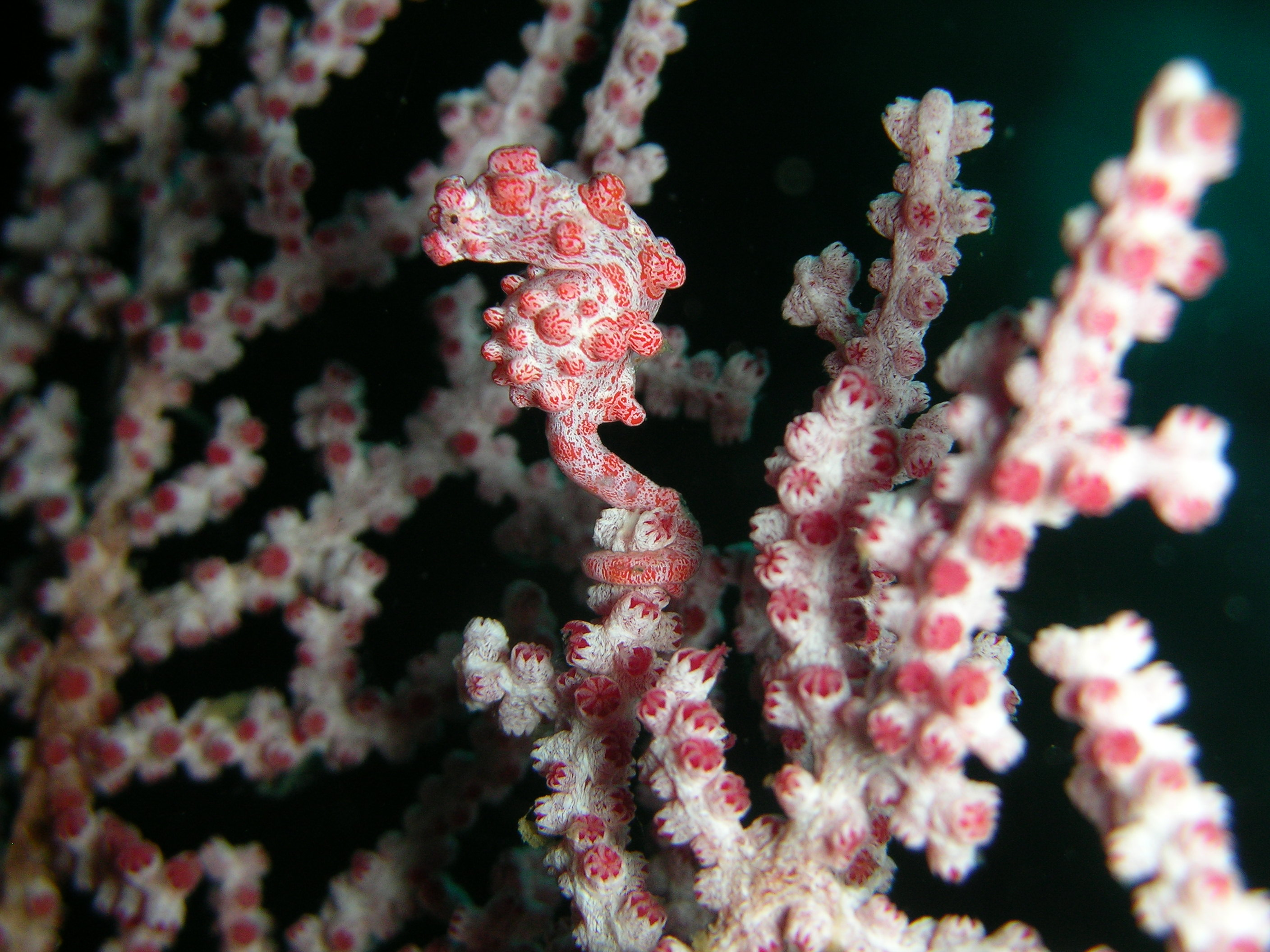
Muricella sp., an acanthogorgiid

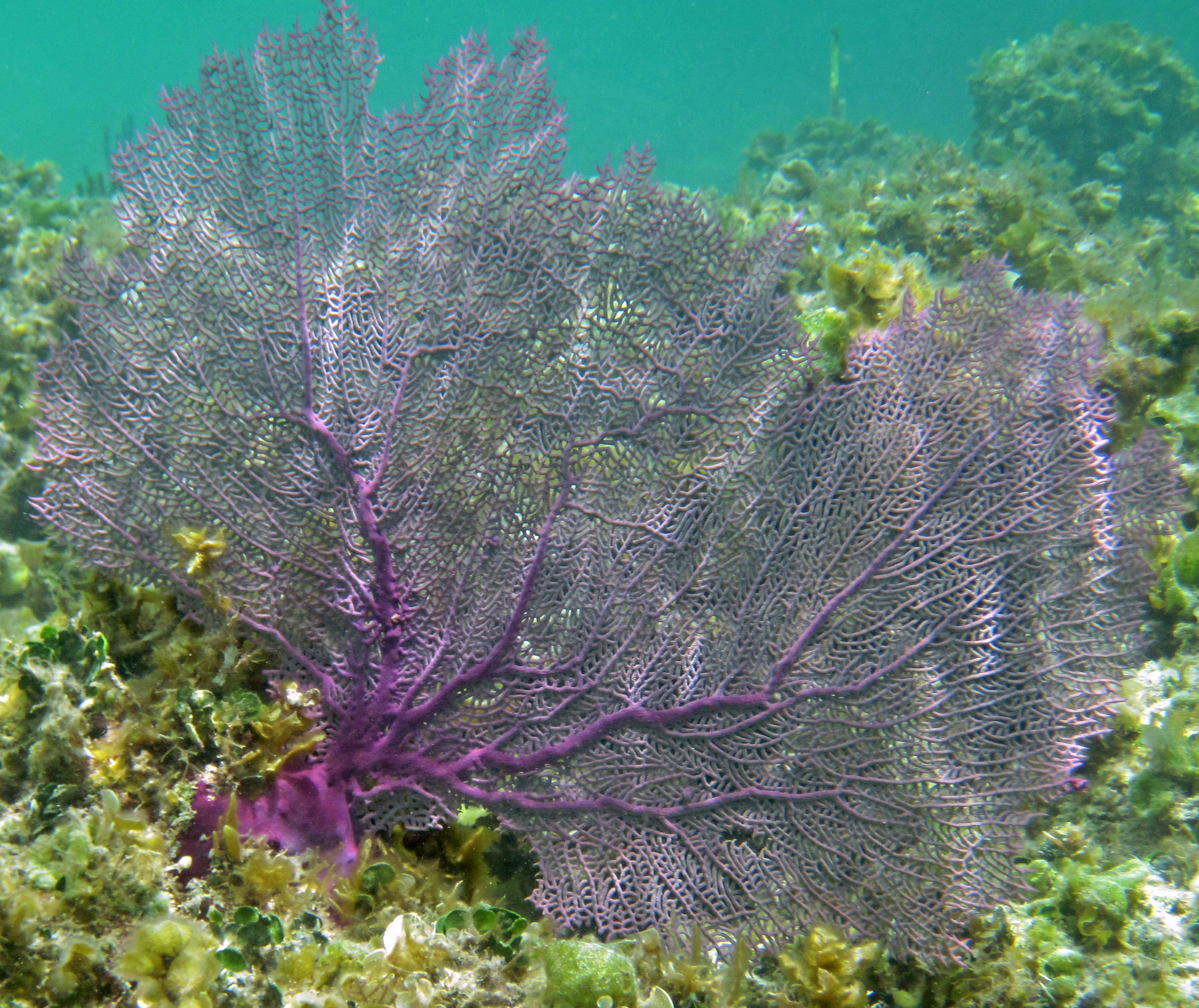
Gorgonia ventalina, a gorgoniid

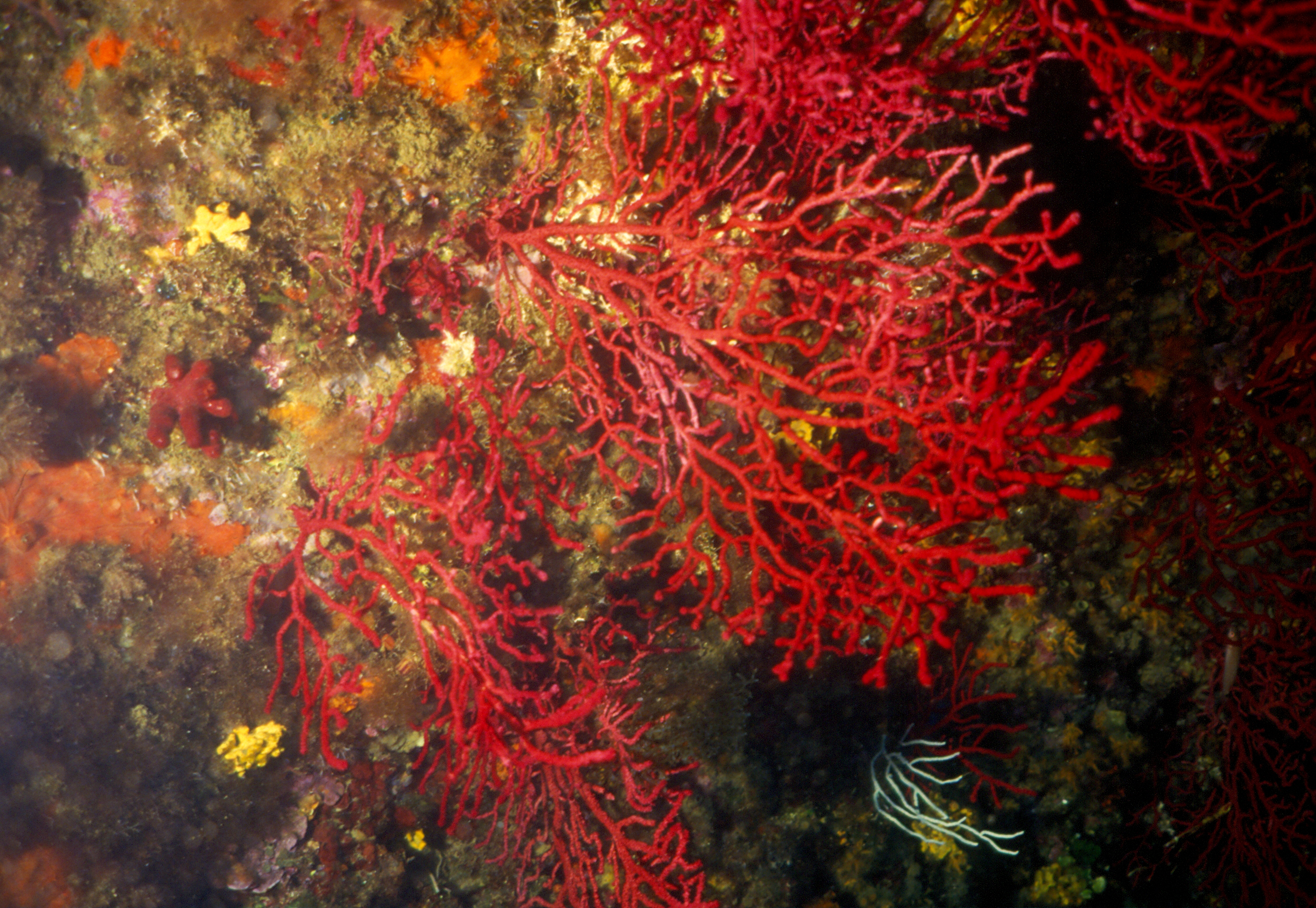
Paramuricea clavata, a paramuriceid

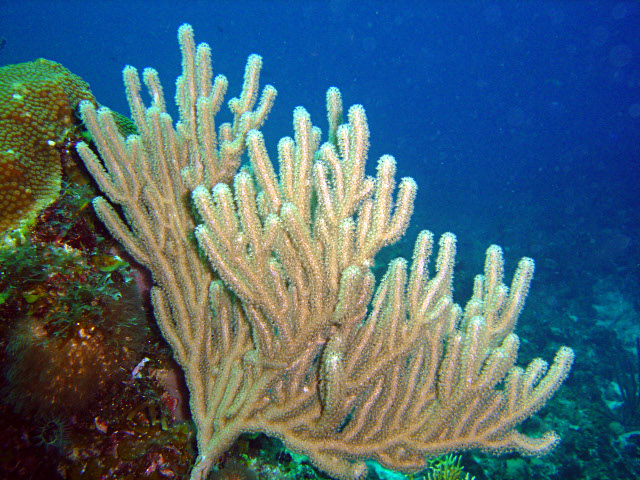
Muricea elongata, a plexaurid

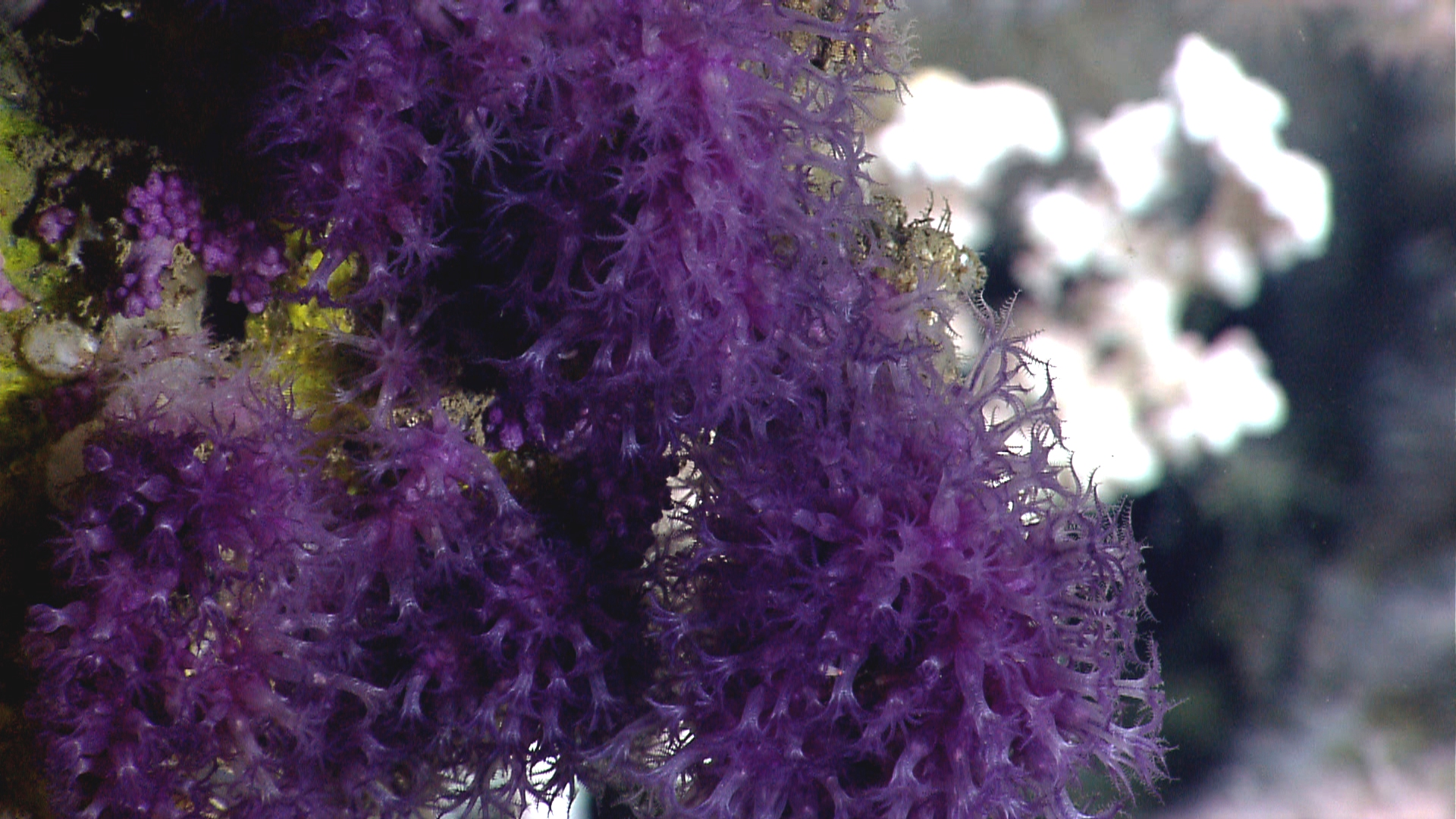
Anthothela grandiflora, an anthothelid

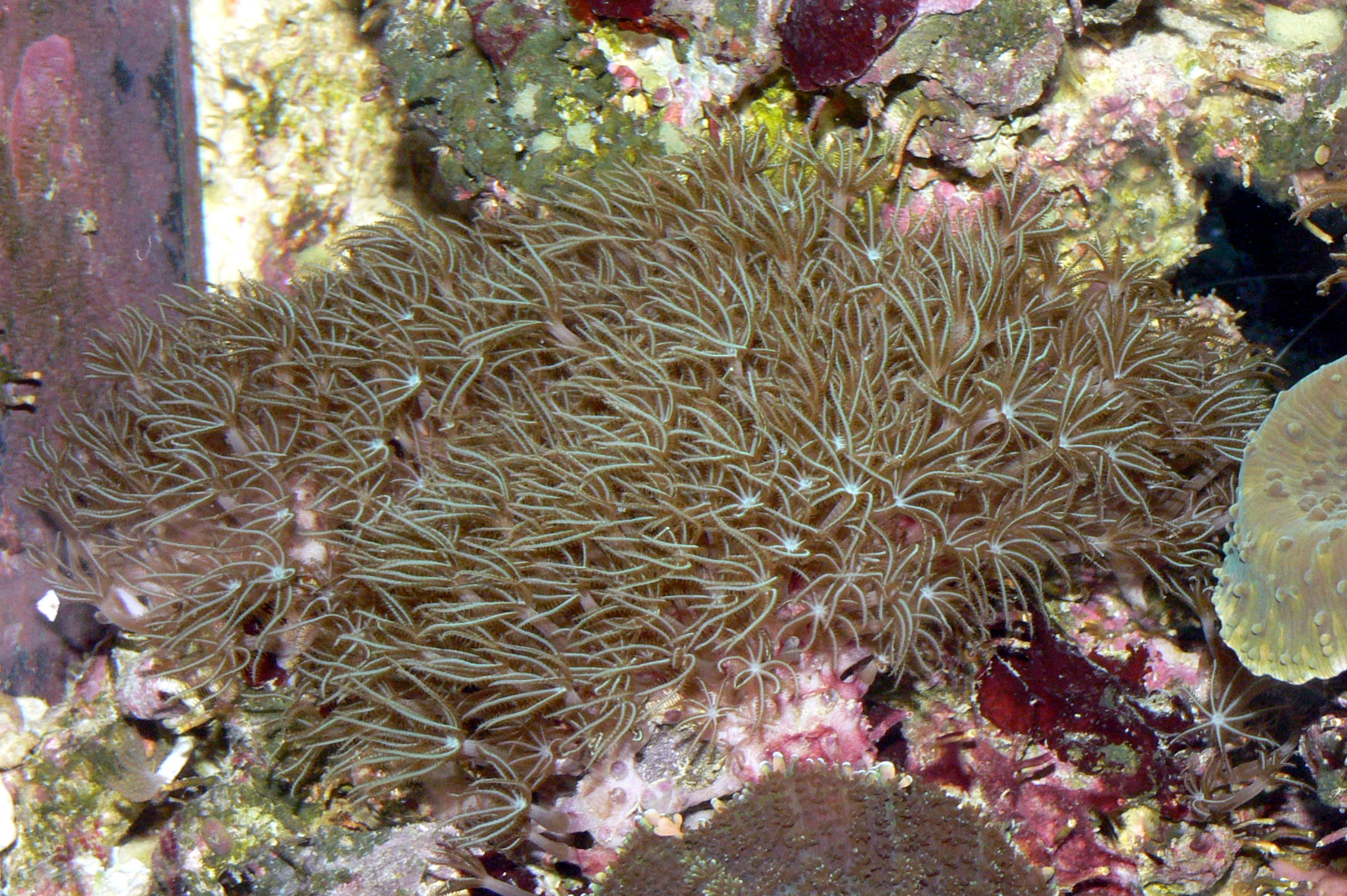
Briareum sp., a briareid

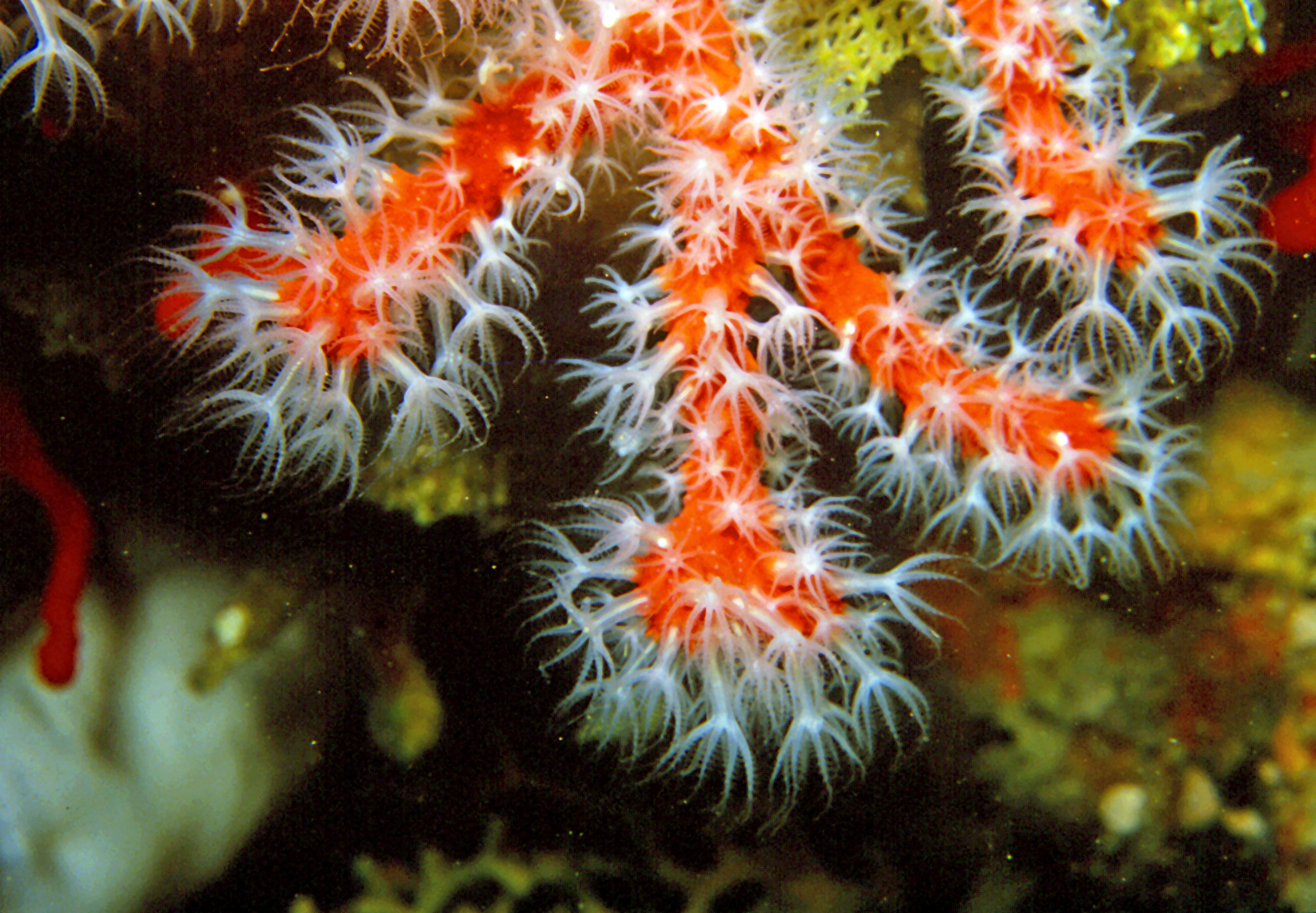
Corallium rubrum, a coralliid

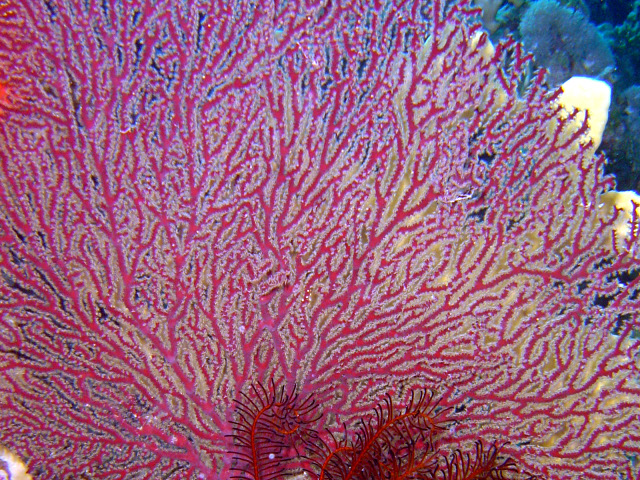
Acabaria splendens, a melithaeid

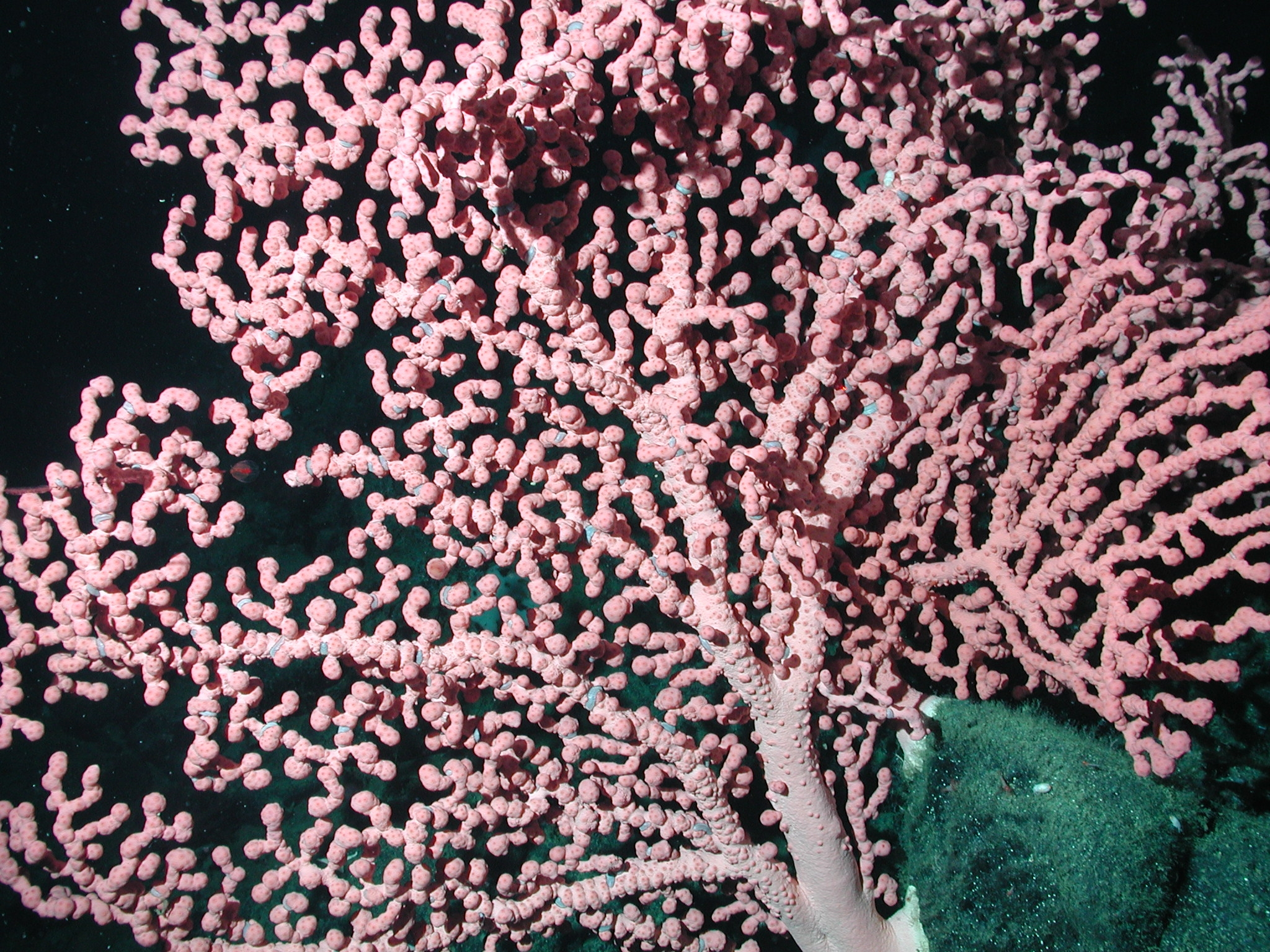
Paragorgia arborea, a paragorgiid

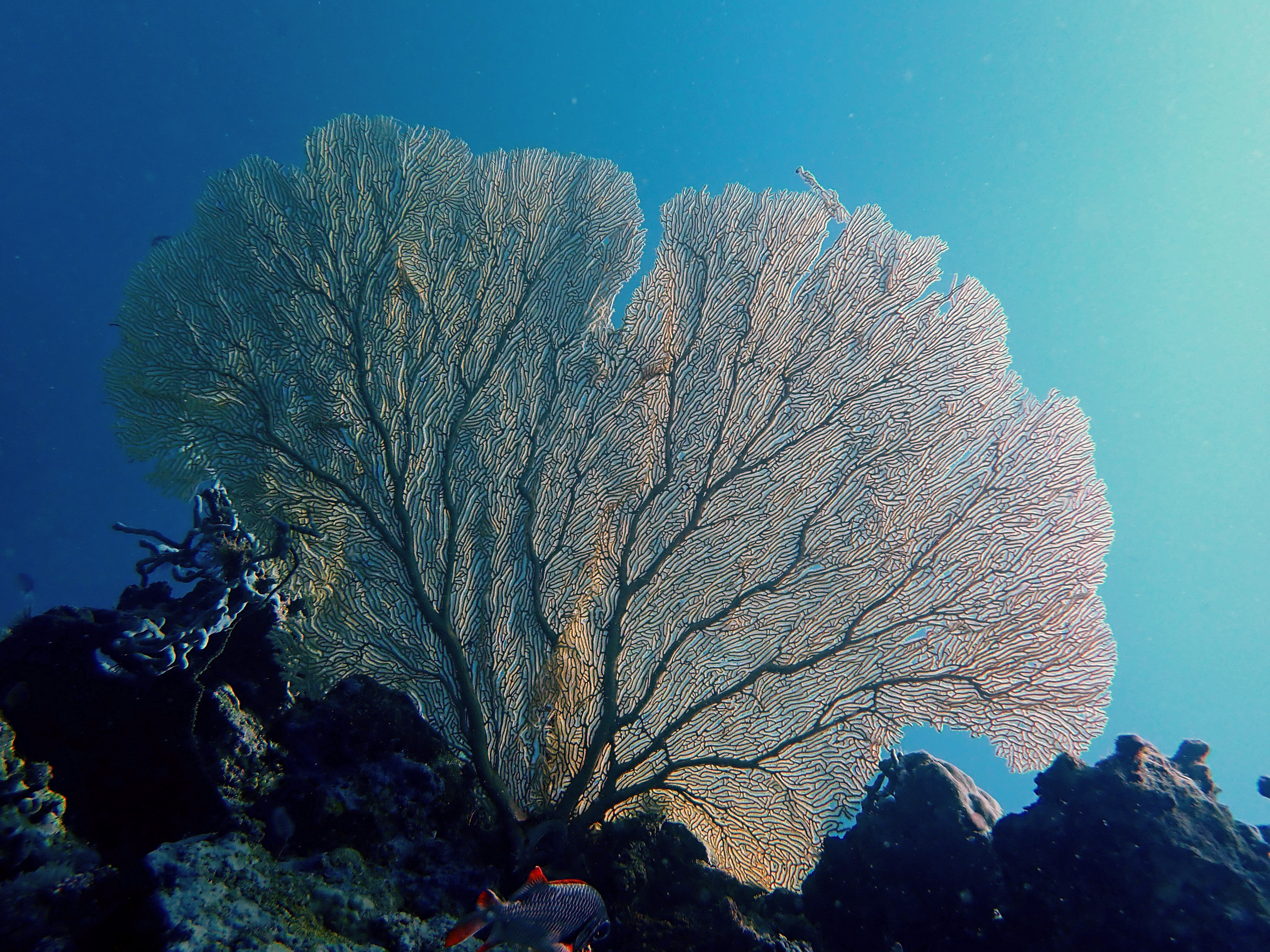
Annella mollis, a subergorgiid

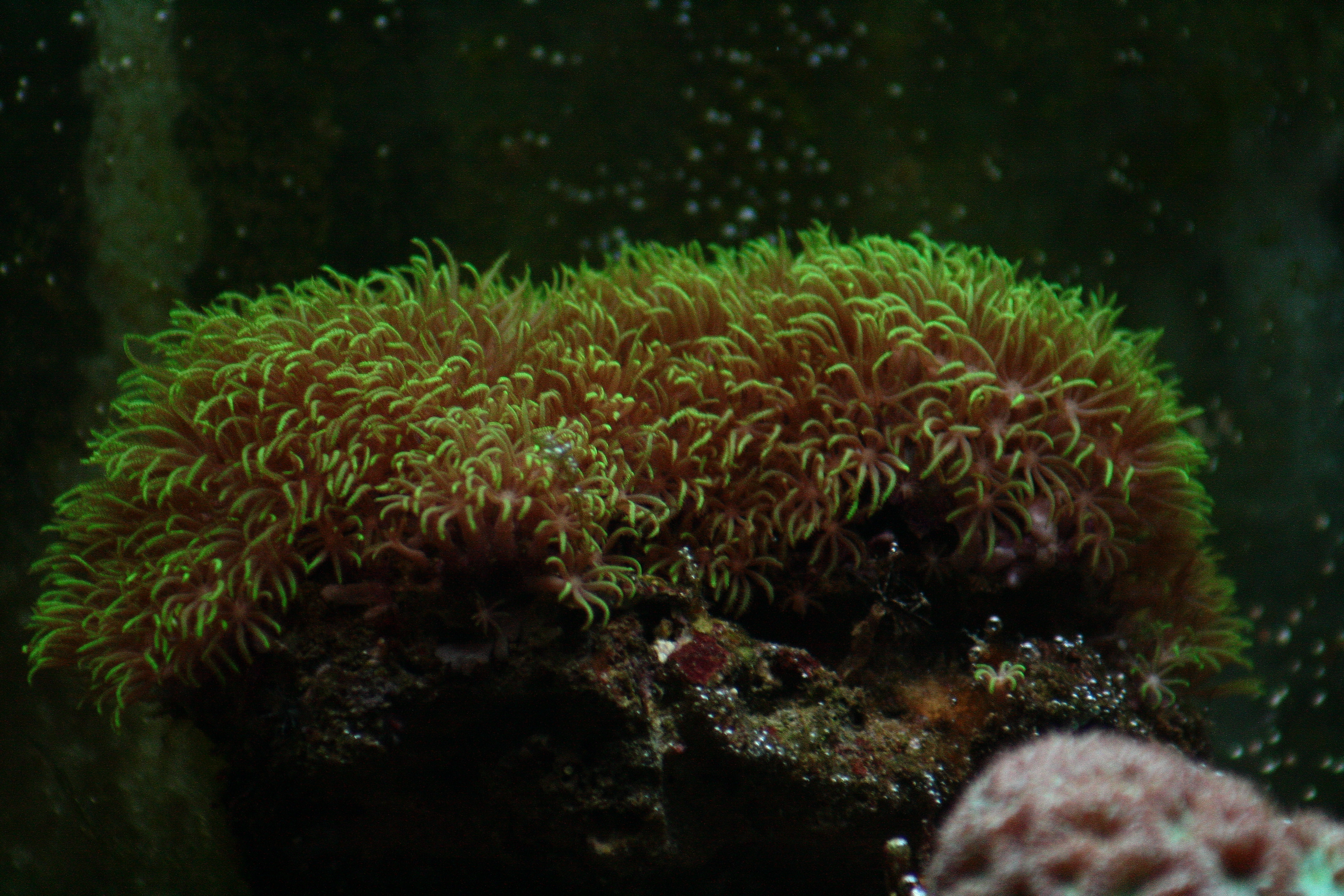
Clavularia viridis, a clavulariid

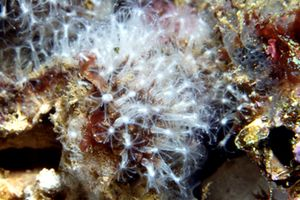
Cornularia cornucopiae, a cornulariid

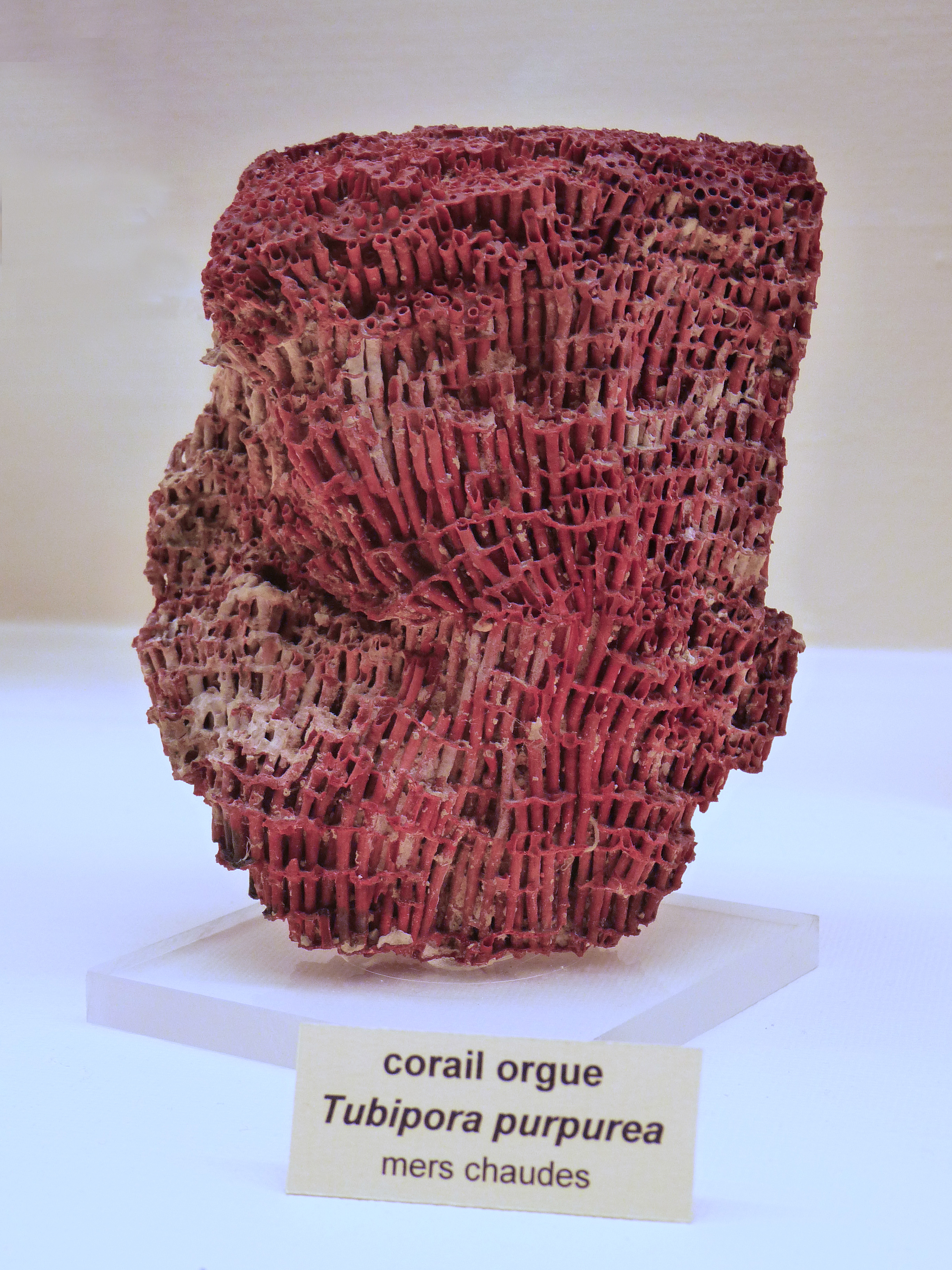
Tubipora musica, Tubiporidae

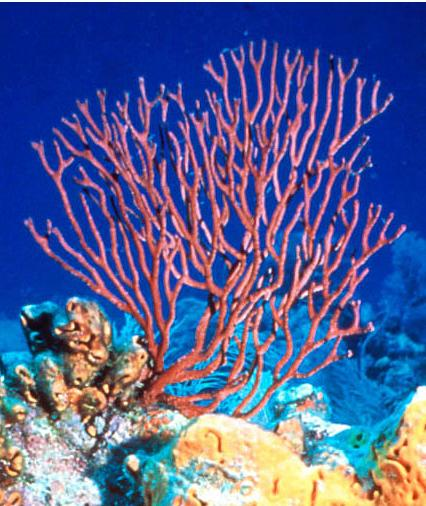
Iciligorgia schrammi
