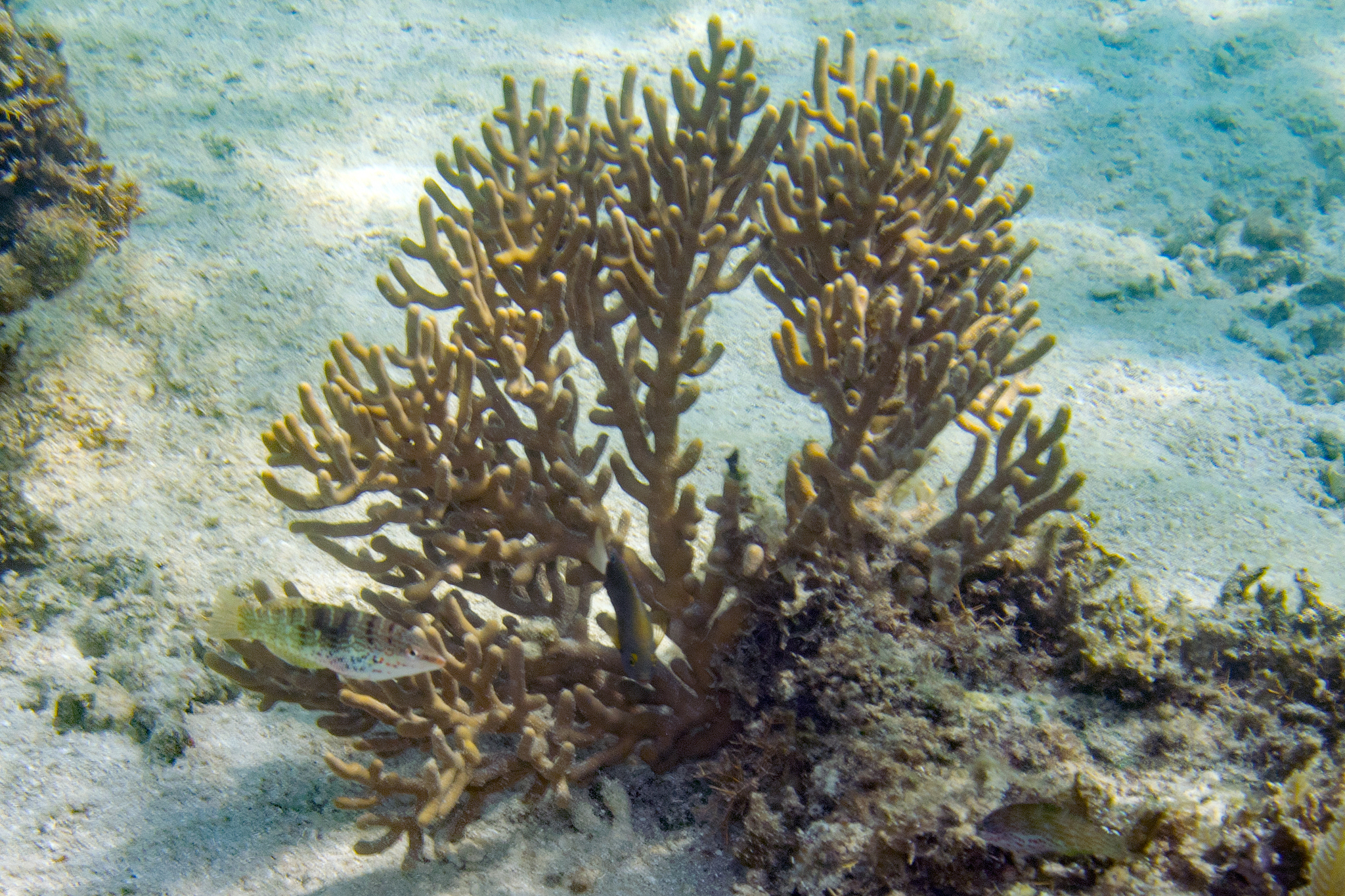

Scientific classification
- Kingdom: Animalia
- Phylum: Cnidaria
- Subphylum: Anthozoa
- Class: Octocorallia
- Order: Malacalcyonacea
- Family: Isididae; Lamouroux, 1812

Genera
- See text

= Isididae =

Family of corals

Isididae is a family of octocorals belonging to the order Malacalcyonacea and formerly to the order Calcaxonia. Currently, the family only includes the genera Isis, Hicksonella and Rumphella.

Prior to 2021/2016, the family Isididae included the genus Isis plus all the genera of the current families Chelidonisididae, Keratoisididae and Mopseidae, while the genera Hicksonella and Rumphella were included in the family Gorgoniidae in the former order Holaxonia.

== Recent history of the classification of Isididae ==
In the late 20th and early 21st century, the family Isididae (i. e. Isididae sensu lato or "in the broad sense") consisted of the following subfamilies:

- Isidinae (containing only the genera Isis and Chelidonisis);
- Muricellisidinae (containing only the genus Murcellisis), which was sometimes included in Isidinae;
- Keratoisidinae;
- Mopseinae, from which a separate subfamily Peltastisidinae was separated by some texts in the 1976 - 1996 period;
- Circinisidinae.

The vernacular name of Isididae sensu lato is bamboo coral.

In 2016, it was proposed that the above subfamilies be elevated to the following families:

- Isididae sensu stricto or "in the stricter sense" (containing only the genus Isis),
- Keratoisididae,
- Mopseidae
- Circinisidae.

The genera Chelidonisis and Murcellisis were deliberately not included in Isididae sensu stricto, with Chelidonisis now being left unassigned to a family and Murcellisis being considered incertae sedis within Octocorallia, with an unclear relationship.

In 2021, the 2016 proposal was partly modified, yielding the following currently accepted families:

- Isididae sensu stricto (containing only the genus Isis) [corresponds to former Isidinae minus Chelidonisis]
- Chelidonisididae (containing only the genus Chelidonisis)
- Keratoisididae [corresponds to former Keratoisidinae]
- Mopseidae [corresponds to former Mopseinae and Circisidinae].

The Muricellisidinae were removed in this new system, because in 2020, the genus Mucellisis (and thus also the subfamily Muricellisidinae) was found not to exist, given that the only two species it consisted of actually belong to the genera Anthothela (in the family Anthothelidae) and Melitheae (in the family Melithaeidae), and thus were moved to these genera.

In 2022, the genera Hicksonella and Rumphella, which until then had been included in the family Gorgoniidae in the former order Holaxonia, were moved to Isididae sensu stricto. Therefore, the family Isididae (i. e. Isididae sensu stricto) currently contains only the genera Isis, Hicksonella and Rumphella.

The following cladogram is based on a maximum likelihood phylogenetic tree, using samples of Ultra-Conserved Elements (UCE) and Exonloci, from a study by McFadden, Ofwegen, Quattrini (2022), with the taxa historically placed within Isididae being bolded:

- Octocorallia
  - Scleralcyonacea
    - - - Pennatuloidea
        - Ellisellidae
      - - - - Coralliidae
            - - - - - Sarcodictyonidae
                    - - - Briareidae
                        - Spongiodermidae
                      - Ideogorgiidae
                  - Erythropodiidae
                - Parisididae
              - Parasphaerascleridae
          - Chelidonisididae
        - - - - - - Chrysogorgiidae
                  - Primnoidae
                - - Keratoisididae
                  - Isidoidae
              - Mopseidae
            - Ifalukellidae
          - - - Helioporidae
            - - Dendrobrachiidae
    - Comulariidae
  - Malacalcyonacea
    - Clavulariidae
    - - - Acrossotidae
        - - Arulidae
          - Tubiporidae
      - - OCT041 Clavularia cf. virida
        - - - - - - Incrustatidae
                  - - Malacacanthidae
                    - Rosgorgiidae
                - Nidaliidae
              - Siphonogorgiidae
            - - Melithaeidae
              - Cerveridae
          - - - - Alcyoniidae
                - - Carijoidae
                  - Acanthoaxiidae
              - - Sarcophytidae
                - OCT044 stoloniferan sp. nov. 3K
            - - - - Sinulariidae
                  - Nephthylgorgiidae
                - Aquaumbridae
              - - - - - - - Acrophytidae
                          - - Leptophytidae
                            - Corymbophytidae
                        - Pseudonephtheidae
                      - Skamnariidae
                    - Victorgorgiidae
                  - - Nephtheidae
                    - - Capnellidae
                      - Paralcyoniidae
                - - Subergorgiidae
                  - - - Cladiellidae
                      - - - Coelogorgiidae
                          - Xeniidae
                        - Lemnaliidae
                    - - - Plexauridae
                        - Pterogorgiidae
                      - - Isididae
                        - - Discophytidae
                          - - - - - Talaroidae
                                  - Keroeididae
                                - Astrogorgiidae
                              - - Paramuriceidae
                                - Euplexauridae
                            - - Eunicellidae
                              - - - Anthogorgiidae
                                  - Scleracidae
                                - - Plexaurellidae
                                  - Gorgoniidae
