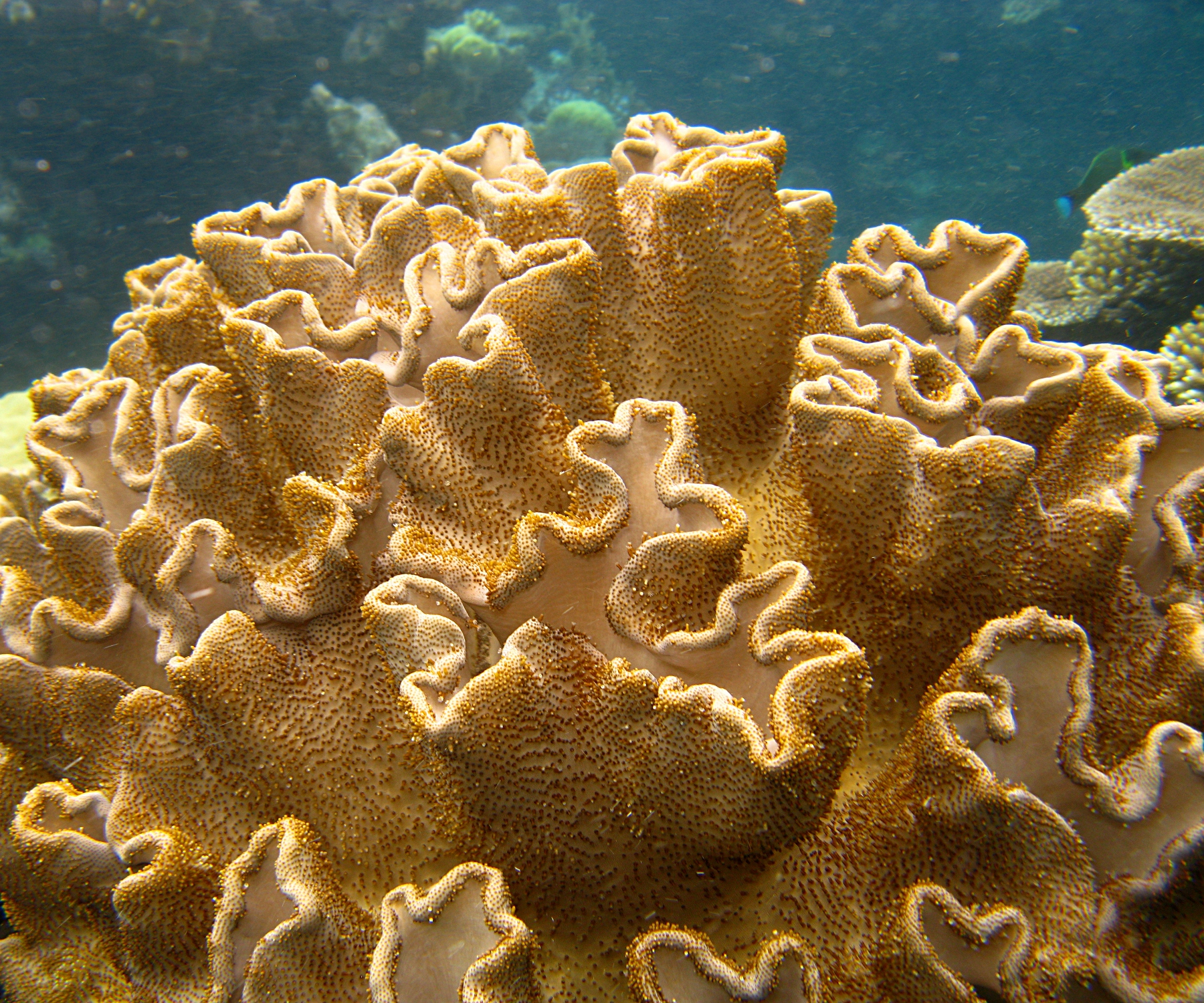
- Sarcophyton in Flynn Reef, part of the Great Barrier Reef, near Cairns, Queensland, Australia.

Scientific classification
- Kingdom: Animalia
- Phylum: Cnidaria
- Subphylum: Anthozoa
- Class: Octocorallia
- Order: Alcyonacea
- Suborder: Alcyoniina; Lamouroux, 1816

= Alcyoniina =

Suborder of soft coral

The suborder Alcyoniina (in some systems classified as the order Alcyonacea in the narrowest sense) is a former octocoralian taxon belonging to the broadly conceived order Alcyonacea.

Since a 2022 revision, almost all the families of former Alcyoniina belong to the order Malacalcyonacea, within which, however, they do not form a monophyletic taxon. Only the problematic (see below) Alcyoniinan family Parasphaerascleridae now belongs to the order Scleralcyonacea.

Members of Alcyoniina are found mainly in the Pacific and Indian oceans.

== Families ==
The World Register of Marine Species listed the following families in the suborder Alcyoniina in October 2022:

- family Acrophytidae McFadden & van Ofwegen, 2017
- family Alcyoniidae Lamouroux, 1812
- family Aquaumbridae Breedy, van Ofwegen & Vargas, 2012
- family Corymbophytidae McFadden & van Ofwegen, 2017
- family Leptophytidae McFadden & van Ofwegen, 2017
- family Nephtheidae Gray, 1862
- family Nidaliidae Gray, 1869
- family Paralcyoniidae Gray, 1869
- family Xeniidae Ehrenberg, 1828

The family Parasphaerascleridae was sometimes also included in the suborder. Alternatively, it was classified as incertae sedis within Alcyonacea.
