= Calcaxonia =

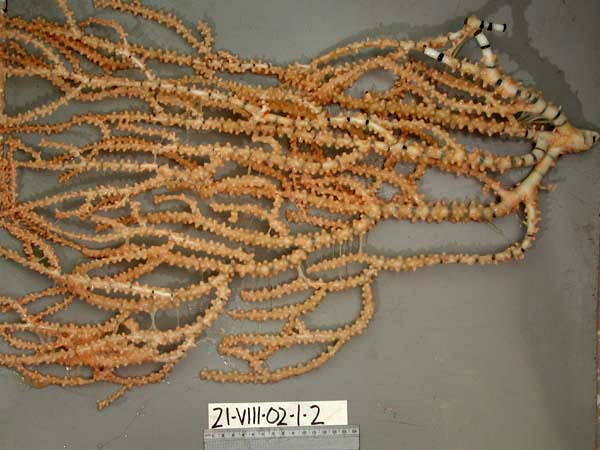

Calcaxonia (1981 – 1999 known only under the informal name restricted Holaxonia) was, in some systems, an Octocorallian suborder of the order Gorgonacea, or alternatively of the broadly conceived order Alcyonacea. Before its formal erection in 1999, it was usually included inside the suborder Holaxonia.

According to a 2022 revision of Octocorallia, former Calcaxonia is part of the newly created order Scleralcyonacea, with the exception of the Calcaxonian genus Isis which is included in the order Malacalcyonacea. Within Scleralcyonacea, almost all former Calcaxonia taxa form together one unnamed clade, only Ellisellidae and Dendrobrachiidae (and possibly also Chelidonisididae) are parts of other clades of Scleralcyonacea.

== Composition ==
The following taxa were included in Calcaxonia:

- family Chelidonisididae (before 2021, this taxon was classified either as part of Isididae or as incertae sedis)
- family Chrysogorgiidae
- family Dendrobrachiidae (before 2019, this taxon was classified as part of Holaxonia, rather than Calcaxonia)
- family Ellisellidae
- family Ifalukellidae
- genus Isis (the current family Isididae includes only this genus plus two genera formerly included in Gorgoniidae being part of Holaxonia; prior to 2021/2016, the family Isididae included this genus plus what are now the families Keratoisididae, Mopseidae and Chelidonisididae)
- family Isidoidae (before 2021, this taxon was classified either as incertae sedis or as part of Chrysogorgiidae)
- family Keratoisididae (before 2021/2016, this taxon was classified as part of Isididae)
- family Mopseidae (before 2021/2016, this taxon was classified as part of Isididae; since 2021, Mopseidae includes the family Circinisididae proposed in 2016)
- family Pleurogorgiidae (before 2021, this taxon was classified as part of Chrysogorgiidae)
- family Primnoidae

Note that while some of the above families were (re)created by various studies in 2021, all the above families were moved to the new order Scleralcyonacea one year later, i.e. in 2022.

== Calcaxonia sensu lato ==
In 2019, G. C. Williams proposed that the name Calcaxonia be applied to the whole clade which, since 2022, has been known as Scleralcyonacea, i.e. the clade composed mainly of Calcaxonia proper, Pennatulacea and Helioporacea. Other authors did not adopt this proposal.
