= Soft coral =

Soft coral is a common name for a group of colonial invertebrates in the class Octocorallia. As the scientific classification was significantly revised in 2022, "soft coral" may refer to:

- Alcyonacea - The historical and now obsolete taxonomic order that formerly contained most soft corals.
- Octocorallia
  - Malacalcyonacea
  - Scleralcyonacea
