= Alcyonaria =

Alcyonaria may refer to:

- Octocorallia
- Alcyonacea
