= Ignis =

Ignis (Latin for fire) may refer to:

- Ignis (album), a 2000 album by Paul Giger
- Ignis (cycling team), an Italian professional cycling team that existed from 1955 to 1968
- Ignis Scientia, a major character in the Final Fantasy XV subseries
- Suzuki Ignis, a subcompact car produced 2000–2008 and 2016–present
- Roggero Musmeci Ferrari Bravo (1868 – 1937), an Italian writer with the pen name ignis
- Ignis, a genus of coral in the Haimeidae family
- Ignis, the Polish part of Axiom Mission 4
- Ignis, an A.I. program in the Yu-Gi-Oh! VRAINS series
