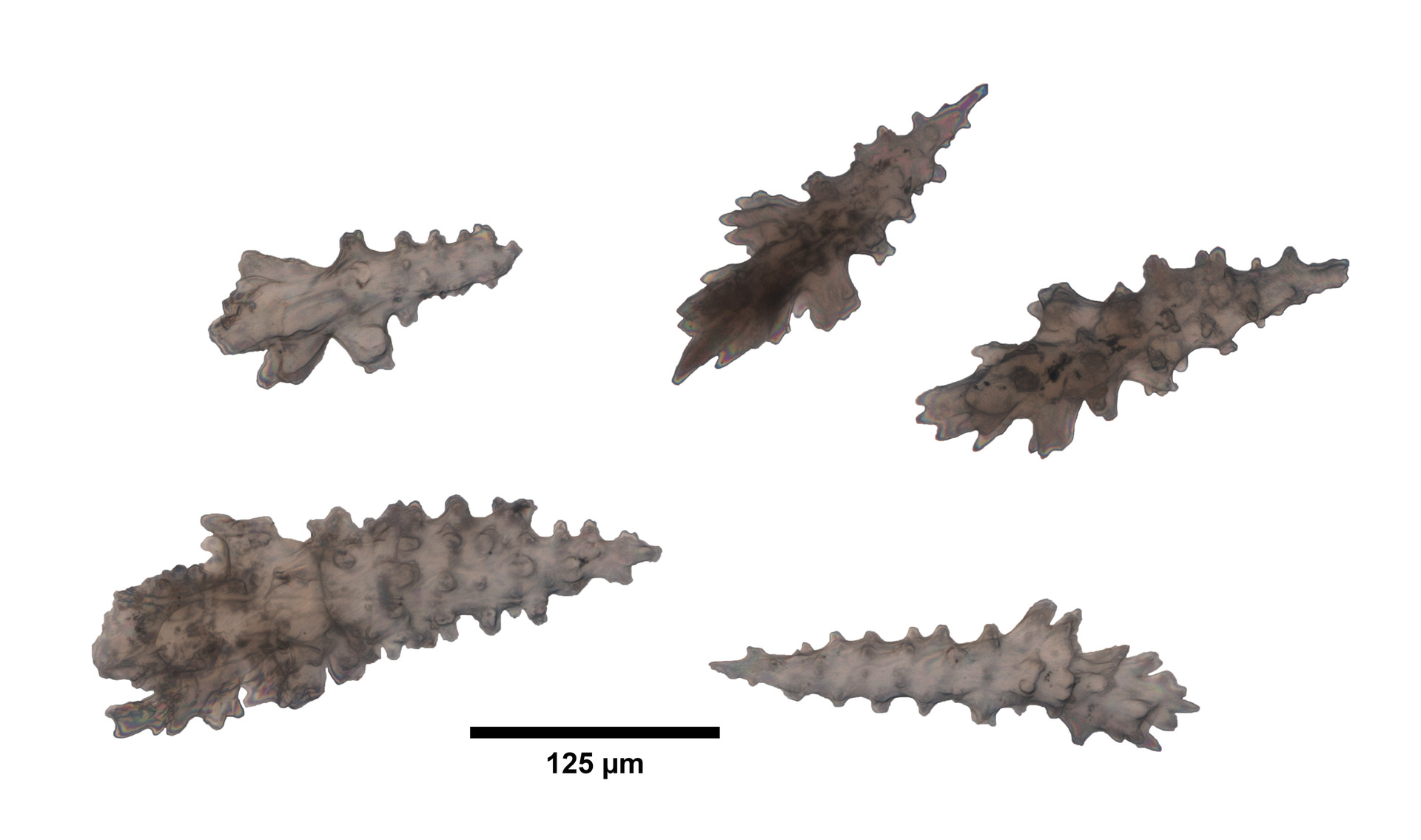

Conservation status
- Secure (NatureServe)

Scientific classification
- Kingdom: Animalia
- Phylum: Cnidaria
- Subphylum: Anthozoa
- Class: Octocorallia
- Order: Malacalcyonacea
- Family: Capnellidae
- Genus: Drifa; Danielssen, 1886
- Species: D. glomerata

Binomial name
- Drifa glomerata (Verrill, 1869)

Synonyms
- Species synonymy: Eunephthya glomerata Verrill, 1869

= Drifa glomerata =

Genus of corals

Drifa is a genus of soft corals in the family Capnellidae. Only one species is accepted to belong to this genus, Drifa glomerata
