= Sea bamboo =

Sea bamboo is a common name for several organisms and may refer to:

- Ecklonia maxima, a species of kelp
- Isididae, a family of coral
