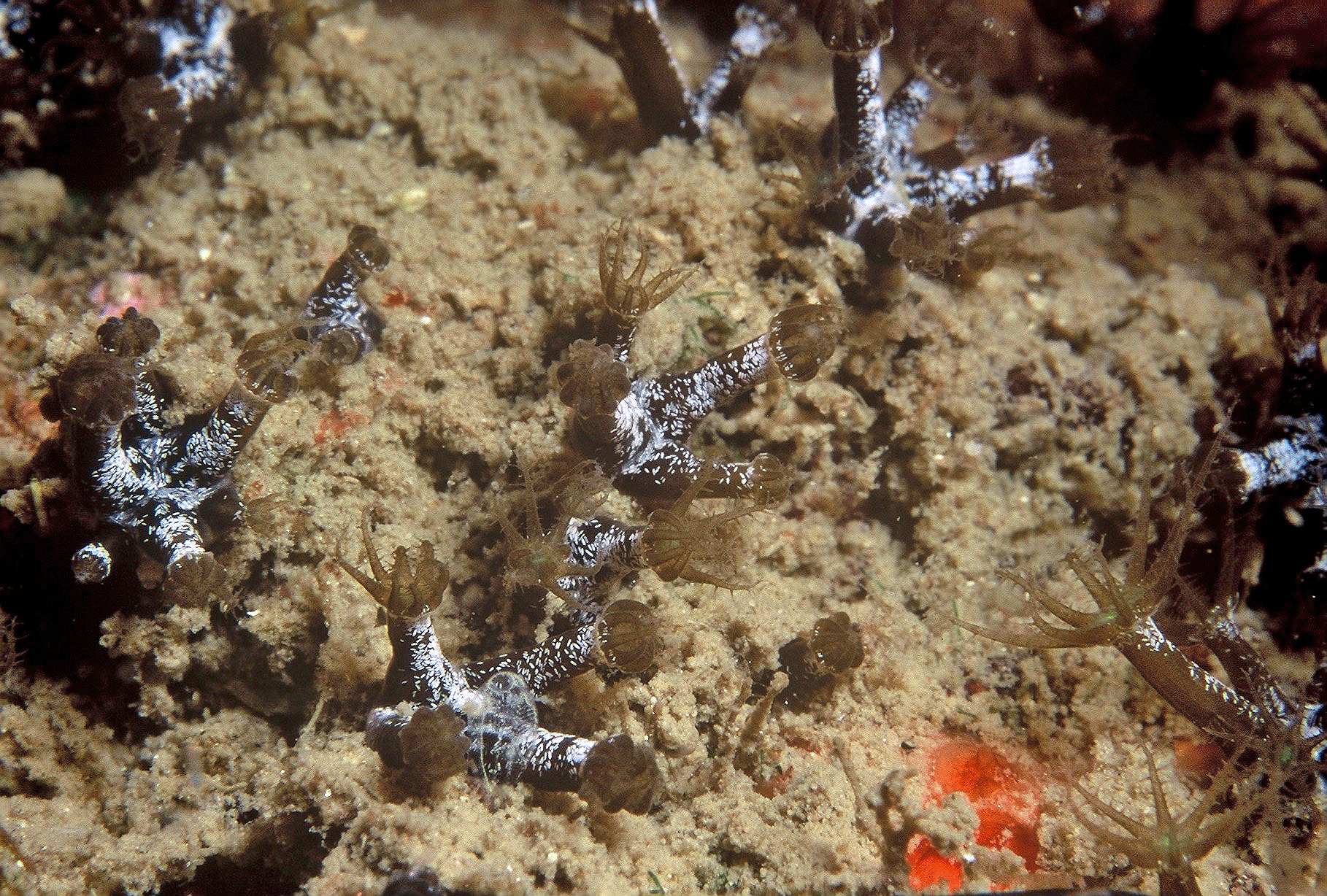
- M. edwardsi

Conservation status
- Data Deficient (IUCN 3.1)

Scientific classification
- Kingdom: Animalia
- Phylum: Cnidaria
- Subphylum: Anthozoa
- Class: Octocorallia
- Order: Malacalcyonacea
- Family: Paralcyoniidae
- Genus: Maasella; Poche, 1914
- Species: M. edwardsi

Binomial name
- Maasella edwardsi (de Lacaze-Duthiers, 1888)

= Maasella =

Genus of corals

Maasella is a genus of soft coral in the family Paralcyoniidae. It is monotypic, with only a single species, Maasella edwardsi. Usually of greenish brown or golden brown color, each polyp has eight pinnate tentacles. This soft coral is found in the Mediterranean Sea and the Atlantic Ocean, at depths of between 2 and 50 metres (7 and 164 ft).

== Description ==
Maasella edwardsi forms small groups in which the polyps are linked by stolons. The anthocodia, the upper part of the polyp, can be fully retracted back into the anthostele, the stiff, lower part. Each anthocodia bears eight tentacles, each with ten to thirteen short pinnules on each side. The anthostele is broader than the anthocodia and is stiffened by calcareous spicules which are sometimes visible as white markings. The polyp has a maximum diameter of 2.6 centimetres (1.0 in) and is usually golden brown or greenish-brown, sometimes with a green or transparent white oral disc.

== Distribution and habitat ==
Maasella edwardsi was first described in 1888 by the French zoologist Henri de Lacaze-Duthiers, from the western Mediterranean Sea. Other sightings were made in the western Mediterranean and the adjoining part of the Atlantic Ocean but the species was considered rare. It is a cryptic species, blending in with its background, and is now considered to be rather more common and widespread than was previously thought. It normally grows on rock and among coralline algae and its depth range is 2 to 50 metres (7 to 164 ft). It was detected for the first time in 2014 in the Aegean Sea, where scientific divers found specimens growing on rocky substrate and on the rhizomes of the seagrass Posidonia oceanica.

== Biology ==
Breeding in Maasella edwardsi may be triggered by the summer warming of the sea or may be related to the phase of the moon. It is unclear whether fertilisation of the eggs occurs inside or outside the polyps, but the early stages of larval development take place on the outside surface of the coral. Brooding the larvae on the surface, instead of inside the gastro-vascular cavity, allows a greater number of larvae to be brooded and may give them a greater relative protection from abrasion.

== Research ==
Three novel sesquiterpene lactones have been isolated from this soft coral. They have been named edwardsolides A, B and C.
