= Anthothela =

Scientific classification
- Kingdom: Animalia
- Phylum: Cnidaria
- Subphylum: Anthozoa
- Class: Octocorallia
- Order: Malacalcyonacea
- Family: Alcyoniidae
- Genus: Anthothela; Kükenthal, 1915

Genus of corals

Anthothela (synonyms include Muricellisis) is a genus of coral in the family Alcyoniidae. The genus was formerly placed in family Anthothelidae.

== Species ==
Seven species are recognised:

- Anthothela aldersladei Moore & Miller in Moore, Alderslade & Miller, 2017
- Anthothela echinata (Kükenthal, 1915)
- Anthothela grandiflora (Sars, 1856)
- Anthothela pacifica (Kükenthal, 1913)
- Anthothela quattriniae Moore, Alderslade & Miller, 2017
- Anthothela tropicalis Bayer, 1961
- Anthothela vickersi (Benham, 1928)
