= Taiaroa tauhou =

Scientific classification
- Kingdom: Animalia
- Phylum: Cnidaria
- Subphylum: Anthozoa
- Class: Octocorallia
- Order: Malacalcyonacea
- Family: Taiaroidae; Bayer & Muzik, 1976
- Genus: Taiaroa; Bayer & Muzik, 1976
- Species: T. tauhou

Binomial name
- Taiaroa tauhou Bayer & Muzik, 1976

Species of deep-water, solitary marine octocorals

Taiaroa is a genus of deep-water, solitary marine octocorals in the family Taiaroidae. Taiaroa is monotypic in the family Taiaroidae and contains a single species, Taiaroa tauhou. The species was first described by the marine zoologists Frederick M. Bayer and Katherine Margaret Muzik in 1976. The scientific name derives from "Taiaroa", the submarine canyon off New Zealand in which the first specimens were found and "tauhou", the Maori word for "strange".

== Taxonomy ==
In 1973, a new species of solitary octocoral was dredged from the seabed off the Otago Peninsula, New Zealand, at a depth of 720 m (2,362 ft). At first it was believed to be a species of burrowing sea anemone and it was given to marine biologist Dr. Cadet Hand for examination. He quickly realised it was an octocoral and sought the assistance of marine biologist Dr Frederick Bayer, who gave it the name Taiaroa tauhou. In 1976, the suborder Protoalcyonaria was re-established to accommodate it and further specimens which had been discovered. This higher-level taxon had been erected by Sydney Hickson in 1894 for non-colonial octocorals. However, there was doubt whether these were really solitary, or whether they were just the young forms of colonial species, and it became redundant when the genera included in it were all transferred to other taxa.

In 2022 the species was reclassified as a member of the newly erected order Malacalcyonacea.

== Description ==
Taiaroa tauhou has a tall, cylindrical body held in place in soft substrate by numerous filaments attached to the base. The anthocodia, the upper part of the polyp bearing the eight pinnate tentacles and the mouth, can be fully retracted back into the anthostele, the rigid, lower part of the polyp. The anthostele is strengthened by spindle-shaped calcareous sclerites and has eight longitudinal ridges. It comprises more than half of the polyp's length. The largest individual examined had a total length of 36.5 mm (1.44 in) and a maximum diameter of 6.5 mm (0.26 in). The retractible anthocodia measured 14.5 mm (0.57 in). The body wall is opaque and beige in colour. The filaments securing the polyp to the substrate are encrusted with sediment.

== Biology ==
Taiaroa tauhou is a solitary coral that reproduces solely by means of sexual reproduction. It may be a hermaphrodite, as one individual examined contained both eggs and spermaries (sperm producing organs), but other individuals only contained eggs or were exclusively male. It is unclear whether the gonads in the bisexual individual were attached to the body wall. It may be that the males liberate spermaries which are ingested by the females, resulting in internal fertilisation, and this would mean that the animals are not hermaphroditic.
