= Haimeidae =

Scientific classification
- Kingdom: Animalia
- Phylum: Cnidaria
- Subphylum: Anthozoa
- Class: Octocorallia
- Order: incertae sedis
- Family: Haimeidae

Family of corals

Haimeidae is a family of cnidarians belonging to the order Alcyonacea.

Genera:

- Haimea Bergroth, 1905
- Haimeia Milne-Edwards, 1857
- Hartea Wright, 1865
- Ignis Dautova, 2018
