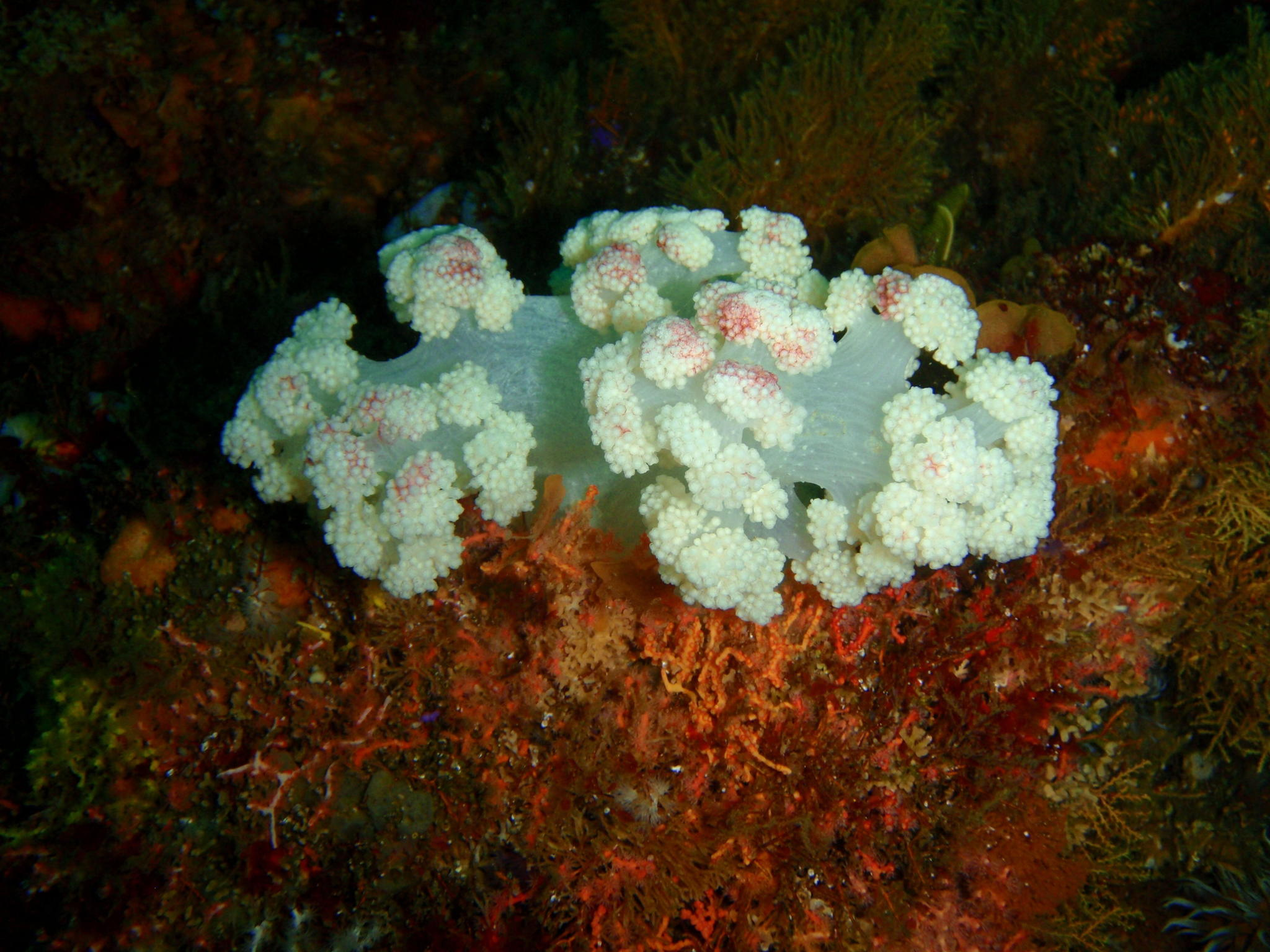
- Pseudonephthea liltvedi

Scientific classification
- Kingdom: Animalia
- Phylum: Cnidaria
- Subphylum: Anthozoa
- Class: Octocorallia
- Order: Malacalcyonacea
- Family: Pseudonephtheidae; McFadden, van Ofwegen & Quattrini, 2022
- Genus: Pseudonephthea; McFadden, van Ofwegen & Quattrini, 2022
- Species: P. liltvedi

Binomial name
- Pseudonephthea liltvedi (Verseveldt & Williams, 1988)

Synonyms
- Gersemia liltvedi (Verseveldt & Williams, 1988); Litophyton liltvedi Verseveldt & Williams, 1988

= Pseudonephthea =

Genus of corals

Pseudonephthea is a genus of corals containing the only species Pseudonephthea liltvedi, or the stalked cauliflower soft coral. It is a cnidarian that is endemic to the coast of South Africa.

== Description ==
Colonies, which may consist of several stems, rise from a single base. The colonies range between 56 mm (2.2 in) and 110 mm (4.3 in) in size. They form erect, cauliflower-like forms with the polyps closely clustered at the ends of short, narrow branches. The bundles of polyps are supported by cup-like structures and do not have. The colonies are variable in colour and usually range from white or pale beige to pink and orange.

They may look similar to species belonging to Eunephthya. Eunephthya species, however, have branches of equal width (opposed to a range of ranch thicknesses found in Pseudonephthea liltvedi).

== Distribution and habitat ==
This species is endemic to the Benguela region off the west coast of South Africa. They lack zooxanthellae, which allows them to grow in deeper regions as they do not rely on the associated photosynthesis for sustenance. They are found in temperate waters at a depth of 20–2,000 m (66–6,562 ft).

== Taxonomy ==
This species was considered to belong to the genus Gersemia until 2022. Following a phylogenomic study it was moved into its own genus and its own family to reflect its unique phylogeny and morphology. The family and genus name pay tribute to its former misclassification to two different genera in the family Nephtheidae.
