= Arulidae =

Scientific classification
- Kingdom: Animalia
- Phylum: Cnidaria
- Subphylum: Anthozoa
- Class: Octocorallia
- Order: Malacalcyonacea
- Family: Arulidae; McFadden & van Ofwegen, 2012

Family of corals

Arulidae is a family of corals belonging to the order Malacalcyonacea.

Genera:

- Arula McFadden & van Ofwegen, 2012
- Bunga Lau & Reimer, 2019
- Hanah Lau, Stokvis, Ofwegen & Reimer, 2020
- Laeta Lau & Reimer, 2019
