= Coelogorgia =

Scientific classification
- Kingdom: Animalia
- Phylum: Cnidaria
- Subphylum: Anthozoa
- Class: Octocorallia
- Order: Malacalcyonacea
- Family: Coelogorgiidae; Bourne, 1900
- Genus: Coelogorgia; Milne Edwards, 1857
- Species: C. palmosa

Binomial name
- Coelogorgia palmosa Milne Edwards & Haime, 1857

Genus of corals

Coelogorgia is a monotypic genus of corals belonging to the monotypic family Coelogorgiidae. The only species is Coelogorgia palmosa.

The species is found in Malesia, Madagascar.
