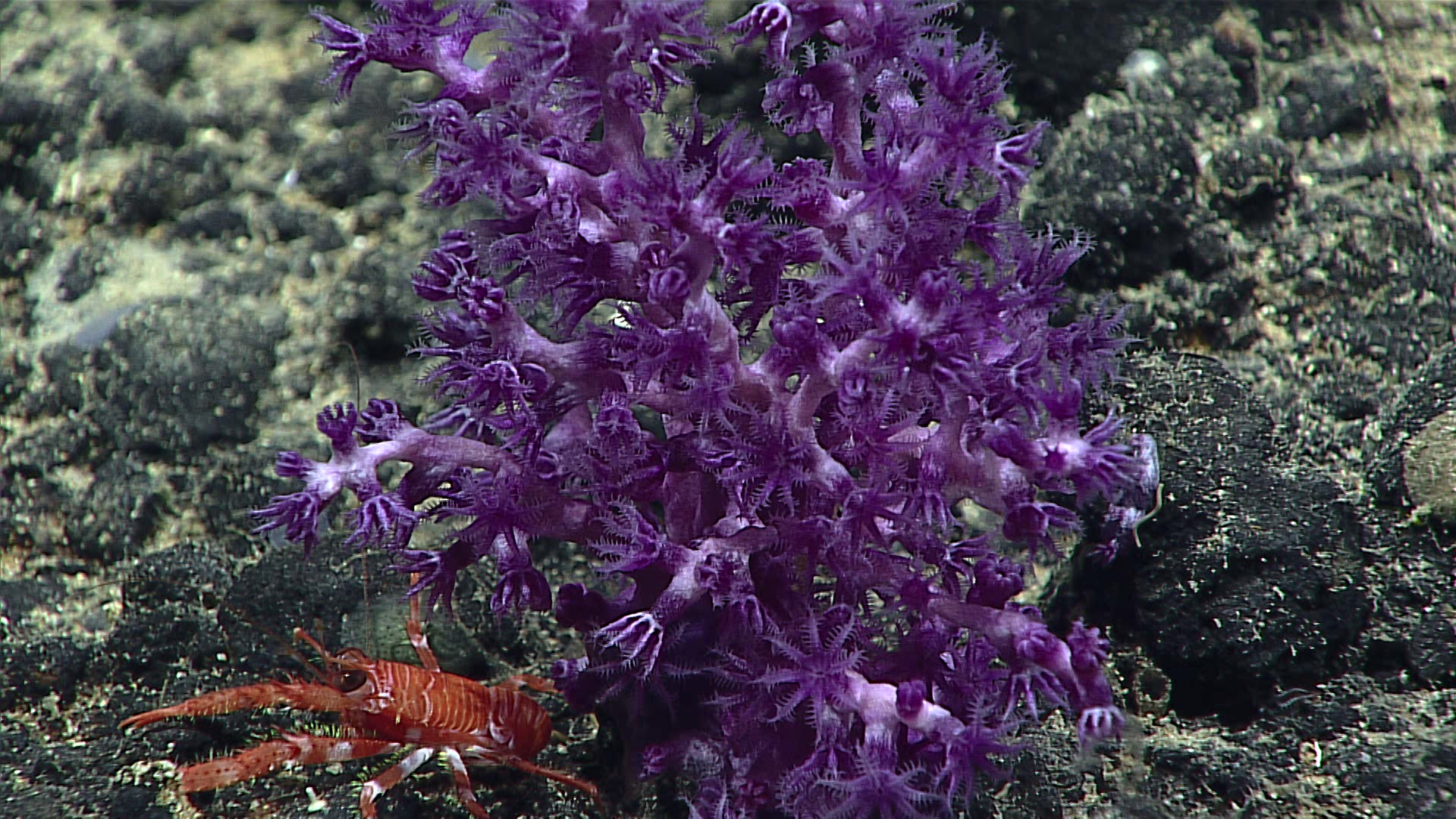
- Victorgorgia alba

Scientific classification
- Kingdom: Animalia
- Phylum: Cnidaria
- Subphylum: Anthozoa
- Class: Octocorallia
- Order: Malacalcyonacea
- Family: Victorgorgiidae; López-González & Briand, 2002
- Genus: Victorgorgia; Lopez Gonzalez & Briand, 2002

= Victorgorgia =

Genus of corals

Victorgorgia is a genus of cnidarians belonging to the monotypic family Victorgorgiidae.

The species of this genus are found in Pacific Ocean, Central America.

== Species ==
The following species are recognised:

- Victorgorgia alba (Nutting, 1908)
- Victorgorgia argentea (Studer, 1894)
- Victorgorgia eminens Moore, Alderslade & Miller, 2017
- Victorgorgia fasciculata Li, Zhan & Xu, 2020
- Victorgorgia flabellata Li, Zhan & Xu, 2020
- Victorgorgia indica Periasamy & Ingole, 2025
- Victorgorgia iocasica Li, Zhan & Xu, 2020
- Victorgorgia josephinae Lopez Gonzalez & Briand, 2002
- Victorgorgia macrocalyx (Nutting, 1911)
- Victorgorgia nyahae Moore, Alderslade & Miller, 2017
