= Acrossota =

Scientific classification
- Kingdom: Animalia
- Phylum: Cnidaria
- Subphylum: Anthozoa
- Class: Octocorallia
- Order: Malacalcyonacea
- Family: Acrossotidae; Bourne, 1914
- Genus: Acrossota; Bourne, 1914
- Species: A. amboinensis

Binomial name
- Acrossota amboinensis (Burchardt, 1902)

Genus of corals

Acrossota is a monotypic genus of corals belonging to the family Acrossotidae. The only species is Acrossota amboinensis.

The species is found in Malesia.
