= Chelidonisis =

Scientific classification
- Kingdom: Animalia
- Phylum: Cnidaria
- Subphylum: Anthozoa
- Class: Octocorallia
- Order: Scleralcyonacea
- Family: Chelidonisididae
- Genus: Chelidonisis; Studer, 1890

Species
- Chelidonisis aurantiaca; Chelidonisis philippinensis

Genus of corals

Chelidonisis is a genus of deep-sea bamboo coral. It is type genus and only member of the monogeneric family Chelidonisididae.
