= Acanthoaxis =

Scientific classification
- Kingdom: Animalia
- Phylum: Cnidaria
- Subphylum: Anthozoa
- Class: Octocorallia
- Order: Malacalcyonacea
- Family: Acanthoaxiidae van Ofwegen & McFadden, 2010
- Genus: Acanthoaxis van Ofwegen & McFadden, 2010
- Species: A. wirtzi

Binomial name
- Acanthoaxis wirtzi van Ofwegen & McFadden, 2010

Genus of corals

Acanthoaxis is a monotypic genus of corals belonging to the monotypic family Acanthoaxiidae. The only species is Acanthoaxis wirtzi.

The species is found in coasts of Cameroon.
