= Keroeididae =

Scientific classification
- Kingdom: Animalia
- Phylum: Cnidaria
- Subphylum: Anthozoa
- Class: Octocorallia
- Order: Malacalcyonacea
- Family: Keroeididae

Family of corals

Keroeididae is a family of cnidarians belonging to the order Malacalcyonacea.

The family as currently circumscribed contains a single genus:

- Keroeides Studer, 1887

Several other genera were previously place in this family. The genus Ideogorgia is now placed in its own monotypic family, Ideogorgiidae, in order Scleralcyonacea, while due to lack data for phylogenomic analysis the genera Ideogorgia and Pseudothelogorgia are considered incertae sedis in Malacalcyonacea.
