= Ifalukellidae =

Scientific classification
- Kingdom: Animalia
- Phylum: Cnidaria
- Subphylum: Anthozoa
- Class: Octocorallia
- Order: Scleralcyonacea
- Family: Ifalukellidae

Family of cnidarians

Ifalukellidae is a family of corals belonging to the order Scleralcyonacea.

Genera:

- Huziogorgia López-González, 2020
- Ifalukella Bayer, 1955
- Plumigorgia Nutting, 1910
- Trichogorgia Hickson, 1904
