= Leptophytidae =

Scientific classification
- Kingdom: Animalia
- Phylum: Cnidaria
- Subphylum: Anthozoa
- Class: Octocorallia
- Order: Malacalcyonacea
- Family: Leptophytidae; McFadden & van Ofwegen, 2017

Family of corals

Leptophytidae is a family of corals belonging to the order Malacalcyonacea.

Genera:

- Circularius McFadden & van Ofwegen, 2017
- Leptophyton van Ofwegen & Schleyer, 1997
- Porphyrophyton McFadden & van Ofwegen, 2017
- Tenerodus McFadden & van Ofwegen, 2017
