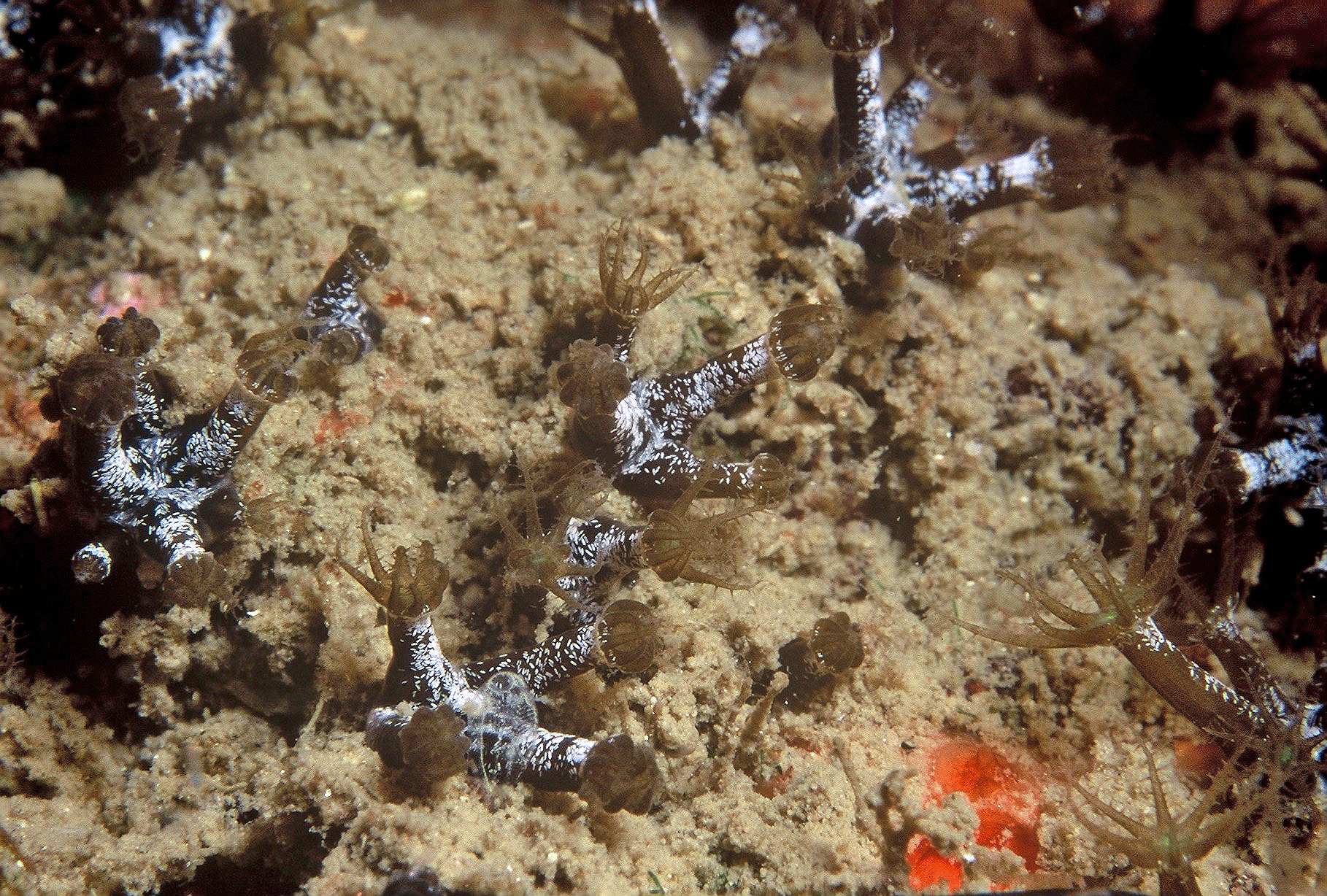
- Maasella edwardsi

Scientific classification
- Kingdom: Animalia
- Phylum: Cnidaria
- Subphylum: Anthozoa
- Class: Octocorallia
- Order: Malacalcyonacea
- Family: Paralcyoniidae; Gray, 1869

Genera
- See text

= Paralcyoniidae =

Family of corals

Paralcyoniidae is a family of soft corals in the phylum Cnidaria.

== Genera ==
The World Register of Marine Species includes the following genera in this family :

- Ceeceenus van Ofwegen & Benayahu, 2006
- Dimorphophyton Williams, 2000
- Maasella Poche, 1914
- Nanalcyon Imahara, 2013
- Paralcyonium Milne-Edwards & Haime, 1850
- Studeriotes Thomson & Simpson, 1909
