= Acrophytidae =

Scientific classification
- Kingdom: Animalia
- Phylum: Cnidaria
- Subphylum: Anthozoa
- Class: Octocorallia
- Order: Malacalcyonacea
- Family: Acrophytidae; McFadden & van Ofwegen, 2017

Family of corals

Acrophytidae is a family of corals belonging to the order Malacalcyonacea.

Genera:

- Acrophytum Hickson, 1900
- Lampophyton Williams, 2000
- Pieterfaurea Verseveldt & Bayer, 1988
