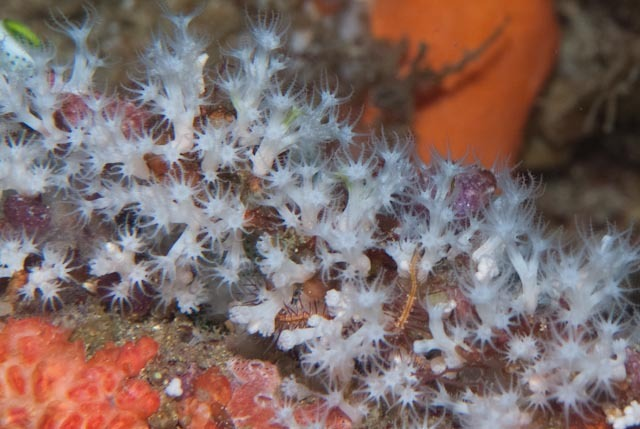
- Corymbophyton bruuni

Scientific classification
- Kingdom: Animalia
- Phylum: Cnidaria
- Subphylum: Anthozoa
- Class: Octocorallia
- Order: Malacalcyonacea
- Family: Corymbophytidae; McFadden & van Ofwegen, 2017
- Genus: Corymbophyton; McFadden & van Ofwegen, 2017
- Species: C. bruuni

Binomial name
- Corymbophyton bruuni (Bayer, 1995)

= Corymbophyton =

Genus of corals

Corymbophyton is a monotypic genus of corals belonging to the monotypic family Corymbophytidae. The only species is Corymbophyton bruuni.

The species is found in South Africa.
