= Aquaumbra =

Scientific classification
- Kingdom: Animalia
- Phylum: Cnidaria
- Subphylum: Anthozoa
- Class: Octocorallia
- Order: Malacalcyonacea
- Family: Aquaumbridae; Breedy, van Ofwegen & Vargas, 2012
- Genus: Aquaumbra; Breedy, van Ofwegen & Vargas, 2012
- Species: A. klapferi

Binomial name
- Aquaumbra klapferi Breedy, van Ofwegen & Vargas, 2012

Genus of corals

Aquaumbra is a monotypic genus of corals belonging to the family of Aquaumbridae. The only species under this genus is Aquaumbra klapferi.

The species is found in Central America.
