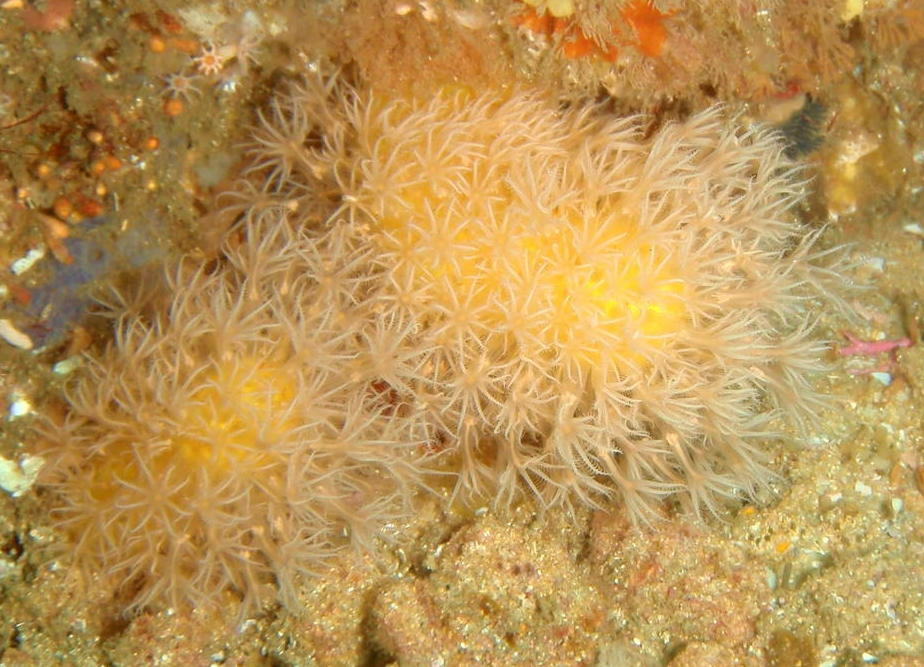
- Parasphaerasclera aurea

Scientific classification
- Kingdom: Animalia
- Phylum: Cnidaria
- Subphylum: Anthozoa
- Class: Octocorallia
- Order: Scleralcyonacea
- Family: Parasphaerascleridae; McFadden & van Ofwegen, 2013
- Genus: Parasphaerasclera; McFadden & van Ofwegen, 2013

= Parasphaerasclera =

Genus of corals

Parasphaerasclera is a genus of soft coral. It is the only genus in the monotypic family Parasphaerascleridae.

== Species ==
The following species are recognized:

- Parasphaerasclera albiflora (Utinomi, 1957)
- Parasphaerasclera aurea (Benayahu & Schleyer, 1995)
- Parasphaerasclera grayi (Thomson & Dean, 1931)
- Parasphaerasclera kimberleyensis Bryce, Poliseno, Alderslade & Vargas, 2015
- Parasphaerasclera mcfaddenae Quattrini, Morrissey & McCartin, 2025
- Parasphaerasclera morifera (Tixier-Durivault, 1954)
- Parasphaerasclera nezdoliyi (Dautova & Savinkin, 2009)
- Parasphaerasclera rotifera (Thomson, 1910)
- Parasphaerasclera valdiviae (Kukenthal, 1906)) (Valdivian soft coral)
- Parasphaerasclera zanahoria (Williams, 2000)
