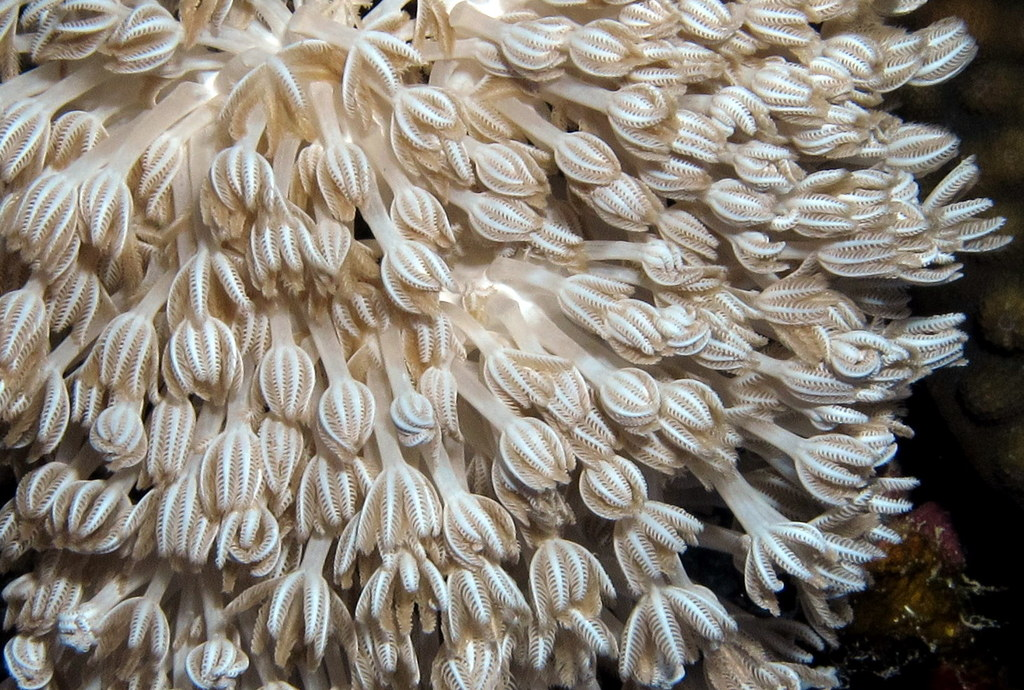
- Heteroxenia fuscescens from family Xeniidae

Scientific classification
- Kingdom: Animalia
- Phylum: Cnidaria
- Subphylum: Anthozoa
- Class: Octocorallia
- Order: Malacalcyonacea; McFadden, van Ofwegen & Quattrini, 2022

= Malacalcyonacea =

Order of corals

Malacalcyonacea is an order of soft corals in the class Octocorallia.

== Families ==
- Acanthoaxiidae van Ofwegen & McFadden, 2010
- Acanthogorgiidae Gray, 1859
- Acrophytidae McFadden & van Ofwegen, 2017
- Acrossotidae Bourne, 1914
- Alcyoniidae Lamouroux, 1812
- Anthogorgiidae McFadden, van Ofwegen & Quattrini, 2024
- Aquaumbridae Breedy, van Ofwegen & Vargas, 2012
- Arulidae McFadden & van Ofwegen, 2012
- Astrogorgiidae McFadden, van Ofwegen & Quattrini, 2024
- Capnellidae McFadden, van Ofwegen & Quattrini, 2024
- Carijoidae McFadden, van Ofwegen & Quattrini, 2024
- Ceratocaulidae López-González, San Martín-Payá & Williams, 2024
- Cerveridae McFadden, van Ofwegen & Quattrini, 2024
- Cladiellidae McFadden, van Ofwegen & Quattrini, 2024
- Clavulariidae Hickson, 1894
- Coelogorgiidae Bourne, 1900
- Corymbophytidae McFadden & van Ofwegen, 2017
- Discophytidae McFadden, van Ofwegen & Quattrini, 2024
- Eunicellidae McFadden, van Ofwegen & Quattrini, 2024
- Euplexauridae McFadden, van Ofwegen & Quattrini, 2024
- Gorgoniidae Lamouroux, 1812
- Incrustatidae McFadden, van Ofwegen & Quattrini, 2024
- Isididae Lamouroux, 1812
- Keroeididae Kinoshita, 1910
- Lemnaliidae Gray, 1869
- Leptophytidae McFadden & van Ofwegen, 2017
- Malacacanthidae McFadden, van Ofwegen & Quattrini, 2024
- Melithaeidae Gray, 1870
- Nephtheidae Gray, 1862
- Nephthyigorgiidae McFadden, van Ofwegen & Quattrini, 2024
- Nidaliidae Gray, 1869
- Paralcyoniidae Gray, 1869
- Plexaurellidae Verrill, 1912
- Plexauridae Gray, 1859
- Pseudonephtheidae McFadden, van Ofwegen & Quattrini, 2024
- Pterogorgiidae McFadden, van Ofwegen & Quattrini, 2024
- Rosgorgiidae McFadden, van Ofwegen & Quattrini, 2024
- Sarcophytidae Gray, 1869
- Scleracidae McFadden, van Ofwegen & Quattrini, 2024
- Sinulariidae McFadden, van Ofwegen & Quattrini, 2024
- Siphonogorgiidae Kölliker, 1874
- Skamnariidae McFadden, van Ofwegen & Quattrini, 2024
- Subergorgiidae Gray, 1859
- Taiaroidae Bayer & Muzik, 1976
- Tubiporidae Ehrenberg, 1828
- Victorgorgiidae Moore, Alderslade & Miller, 2017
- Xeniidae Ehrenberg, 1828
