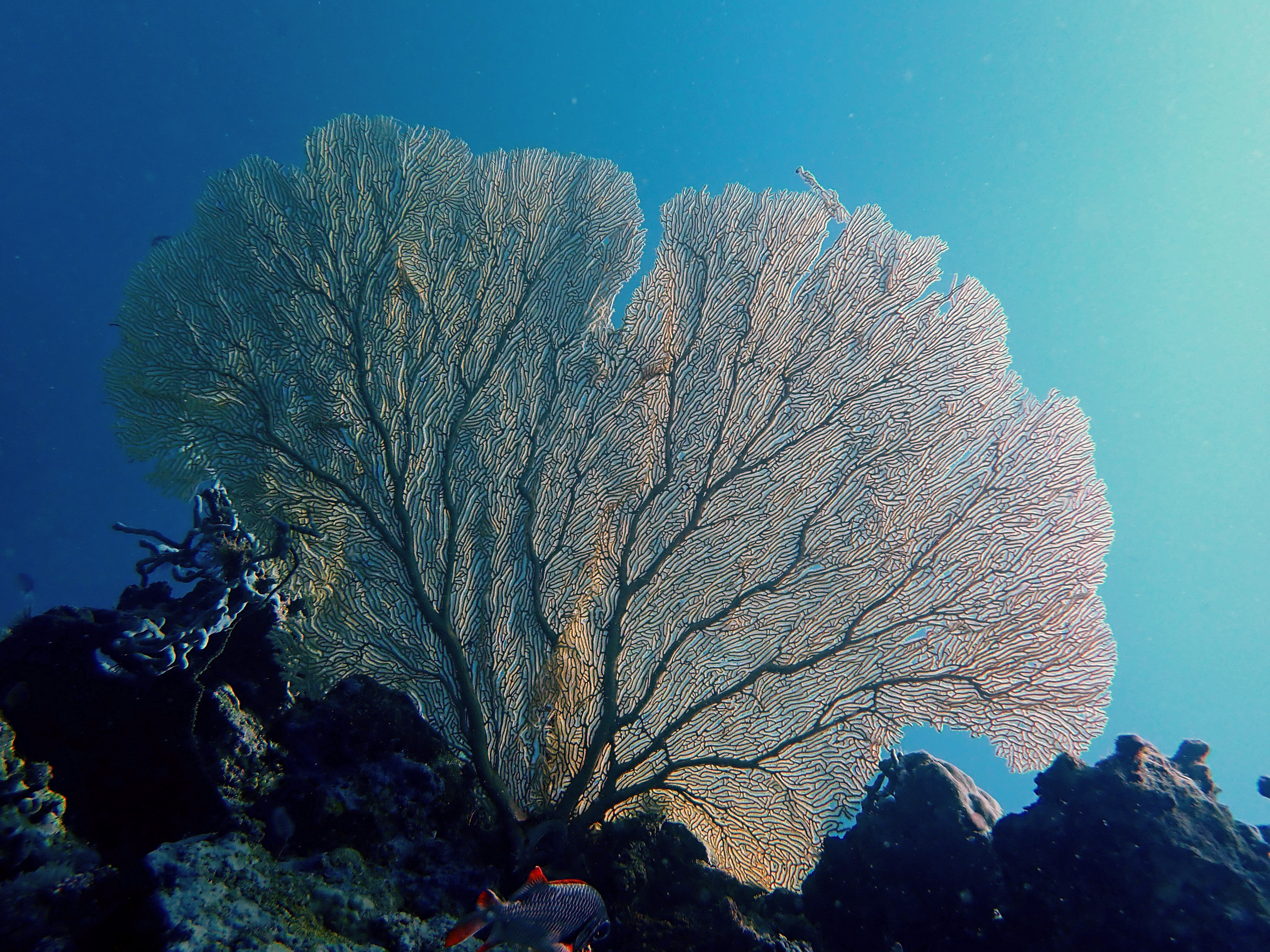
- Giant sea fan, Annella mollis

Scientific classification
- Kingdom: Animalia
- Phylum: Cnidaria
- Subphylum: Anthozoa
- Class: Octocorallia
- Order: Alcyonacea
- Suborder: Scleraxonia; Studer, 1887

Families
- See text

= Scleraxonia =

Suborder of corals

Scleraxonia is a suborder of corals, a member of the phylum Cnidaria.

== Characteristics ==
Members of Scleraxonia have a skeletal axis made of calcified spicules, organic fibres or both, which may be separate, linked or fused together.

== Families and genera ==
There are nine recognised families in this suborder and over thirty genera, with four families (Anthothelidae, Briareidae, Coralliidae and Subergorgiidae) containing some deep-water species and two families (Paragorgiidae and Parisididae) being exclusively deep water.

Families and genera in this suborder include:

- Anthothelidae Broch, 1916
  - Alertigorgia Kükenthal, 1908
  - Anthothela Verrill, 1879
  - Briareopsis Bayer, 1993
  - Erythropodium Kölliker, 1865
  - Iciligorgia Duchassaing, 1870
  - Lateothela Moore, Alderslade & Miller, 2017
  - Solenocaulon Gray, 1862
  - Stereogorgia
  - Tubigorgia Pasternak, 1985
  - Williamsium Moore, Alderslade & Miller, 2017
- Briareidae Gray, 1859
  - Briareum Blainville, 1834
  - Lignopsis Perez & Zamponi, 2000
  - Pseudosuberia Kükenthal, 1919
- Coralliidae Lamouroux, 1812
  - Corallium Cuvier, 1798
  - Hemicorallium Gray, 1867
  - Paracorallium Bayer & Cairns, 2003
- Melithaeidae Gray, 1870
  - Asperaxis Alderslade, 2007
  - Melithaea Milne-Edwards, 1857
- Paragorgiidae Kukenthal, 1916
  - Paragorgia Milne-Edwards, 1857
  - Sibogagorgia Stiasny, 1937
- Parisididae Aurivillius, 1931
  - Parisis Verrill, 1864
- Spongiodermidae Wright & Studer, 1889
  - Callipodium Verrill, 1876
  - Diodogorgia Kuekenthal, 1919
  - Homophyton Gray, 1866
  - Sclerophyton Cairns & Wirshing, 2015
  - Titanideum Verrill, 1864
  - Tripalea Bayer, 1955
- Subergorgiidae Gray, 1859
  - Annella Gray, 1858
  - Rosgorgia Lopez Gonzalez & Gili, 2001
  - Subergorgia Gray, 1857
- Victorgorgiidae Moore, Alderslade & Miller, 2017
  - Victorgorgia Lopez Gonzalez & Briand, 2002
