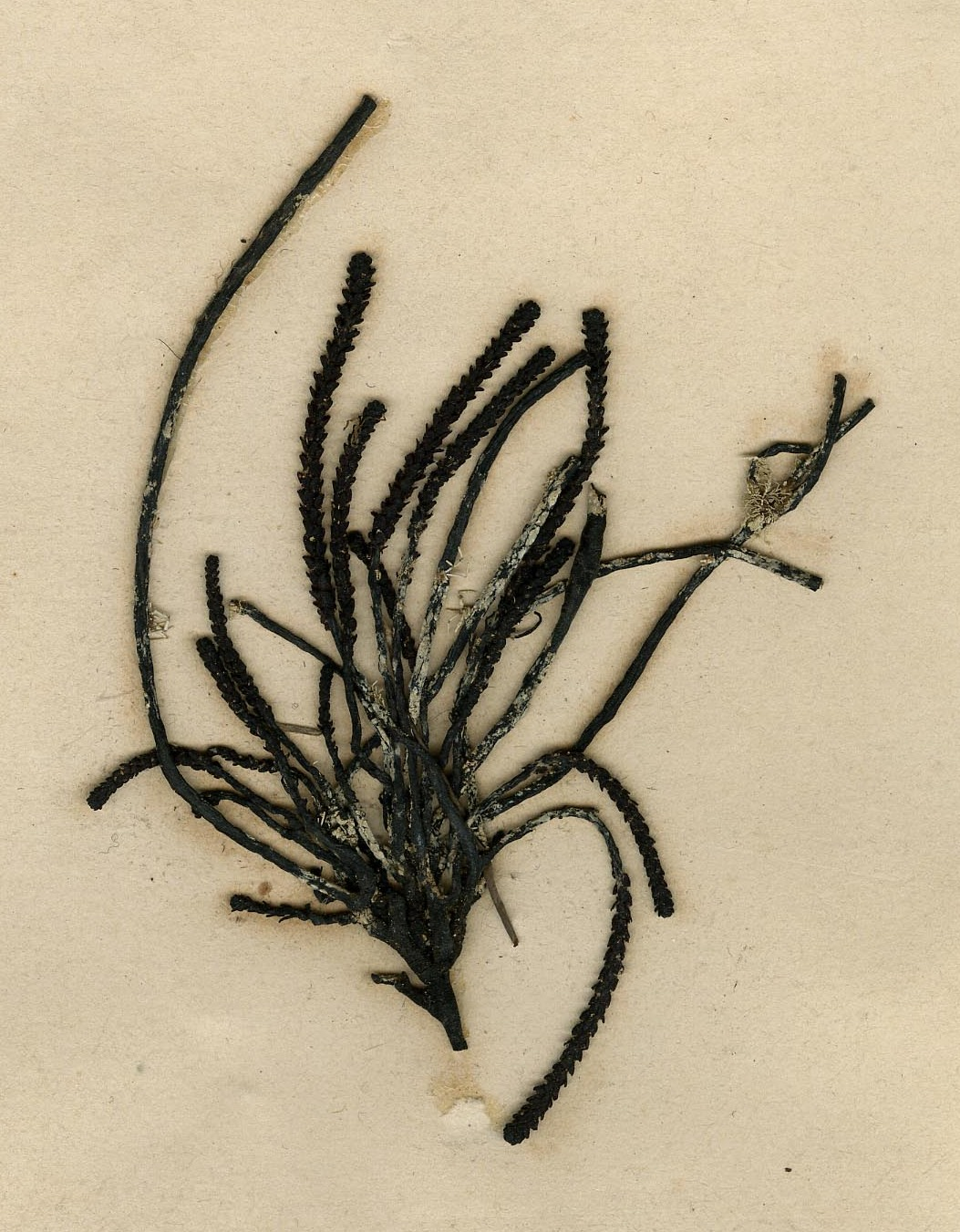
- Mopsea encrinula

Scientific classification
- Kingdom: Animalia
- Phylum: Cnidaria
- Subphylum: Anthozoa
- Class: Octocorallia
- Order: Scleralcyonacea
- Family: Mopseidae
- Genus: Mopsea; Lamouroux, 1816

Type species
- Isis encrinula Lamarck, 1815

Other species
- Mopsea triaknema Alderslade, 1998

= Mopsea =

Genus of corals

Mopsea is a genus of coral belonging to the Mopseidae family. It comprises two species, Mopsea encrinula and Mopsea triaknema, found around the coasts of Australia at depths ranging from 60 to 220 metres (200 to 720 ft). Colonies are orange-brown and grow up to around 30 centimetres (12 in) in size. They comprise multiple branches from which grow feather-shaped structures. Polyps are covered in sclerites and span across the entire colony. The two species can be distinguished by the shape of their sclerites.

The genus was originally erected by Jean Vincent Félix Lamouroux in 1816 as a part of the family Isididae. It comprised two species previously assigned to Isis, Mopsea encrinula and Mopsea dichotoma, to which other species were later added. Controversy over the identity of M. dichotoma's type specimen, possibly belonging to an unrelated melithaeid genus, culminated in a 1993 ruling by the International Commission on Zoological Nomenclature designating M. encrinula as the type species. A later reassessment divided most of the described species between other genera, leaving M. encrinula and the newly described M. triaknema as the only accepted species. In 2021, Isididae was shown through molecular phylogenetics to be polyphyletic, and Mopsea was reassigned to the eponymous family Mopsidae.

== Description ==
Mopsea colonies have a branching structure, which takes place in a single plane. Fine twigs, termed pinnae, originate from the principal branches in a feather-like (plumose) pattern. Colonies can reach up to around 30 centimetres (12 in), and are brown to orange in color. Polyps are white, and are equally distributed on both the principal branches and the pinnae.

The branches comprise a series of horny nodes separated by calcareous internodes. In the stem and the lower branches, corresponding to the older parts of the colony, internodes are usually brown and opaque, while higher branches will range in color to red, beige, or even translucent. In the pinnae, internodes vary in color from orange-brown to yellow. Nodes vary in color and show translucent patches in the older regions, which becomes a continuous pattern in the younger branches and forms a band surrounding the nodes in the pinnae. Internodes bear tooth-like spines arranged along ridges, and nodes may have ridges lining up with those of the internodes. Internodes of the principal branches usually bear one or two pinnae each.

=== Polyps ===
Polyps of Mopsea are covered in spine-bearing sclerites, less than 0.2 millimetres (0.0079 in) in length. The body comprises seven longitudinal rows of oval or crescent-shaped sclerites. However, as the polyp lies in an oblique position, only three to four sclerites are present on the side facing the branch. The oral opening of each polyp, including the bases of its eight tentacles, is covered by an operculum, or anthopoma. It is divided into eight sectors (octants), covered in sclerites continuous with the body covering. Each octant bears one to two crescent-shaped sclerites at its base, followed by a linear arrangement which varies depending on the species. The tissue linking the polyps together, or coenenchyme, is covered in sclerites of various shapes.

=== Species ===
In Mopsea encrinula, the octants are covered by several sclerites of various shapes, while each is dominated by a single, large triradial sclerite in M. triaknema, surrounded by smaller elements. Triradial sclerites also occur, less frequently, in M. encrinula. The sclerites in the coenenchyme also differ, each having two rounded protrusions in M. encrinula, but multiple tooth-like protrusions in M. triaknema.

There is little difference in structure, growth or coloration between colonies formed by the two species, and the difference in the shapes of oral sclerites has been described as the "most significant difference" by researcher Philip Alderslade, who stated that this character usually shows little variation within a single genus.

== Distribution ==
Mopsea encrinula and Mopsea triaknema are both known from coastal Australia. M. encrinula has been found near the coast of Western Australia and South Australia, while M. triaknema is known from the Sydney Basin. Specimens have been collected from depths of around 60 to 220 metres (200 to 720 ft).

== History ==
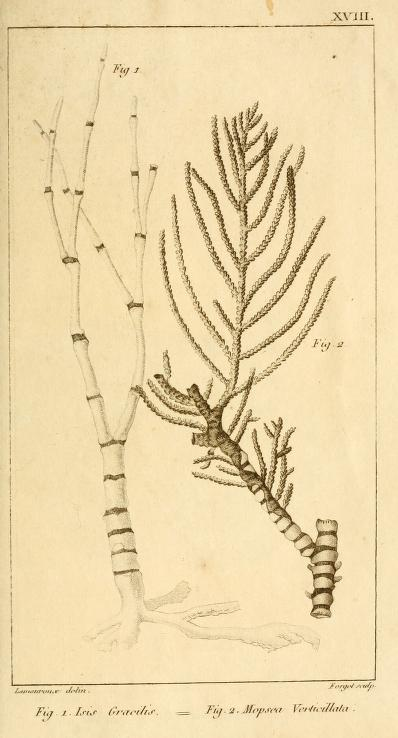
1816 drawing of Mopsea encrinula (right) and "Isis gracilis" by Lamouroux

The species currently known as Mopsea encrinula was first mentioned without a description by Jean Vincent Félix Lamouroux in a 1812 publication, under the nomen nudum of Meliteae verticillaris. It was formally described by Jean-Baptiste de Lamarck three years later as Isis encrinula, likely reusing the same material collected in modern-day Australia, but assigning it to a different genus based on node anatomy. The genus Mopsea was established in 1816 by Jean Vincent Félix Lamouroux as part of the family Isididae. It comprised two species formerly assigned to Isis, M. encrinula and M. dichotoma. The genus was named after "one of the Sirens", likely a variant spelling of Molpe.

The inclusion of M. dichotoma to the genus led Antoine Risso to define the branching pattern as the defining characteristic of the genus in 1826, while Henri Milne-Edwards and Jules Haime elevated M. dichotoma to type species in 1850. In 1858, John Edward Gray moved it to a distant melithaeid genus, Mopsella, while later additions to Mopsea formed the new genus Isidella, leaving M. encrinula as the only accepted species.

Gray erected the family "Mopseadae" (Note: Modern animal family names usually end in -idae) in 1870, including Mopsea and Isidella. Théophile Rudolphe Studer merged them back into Isididae in 1887, placing Mopsea in the subfamily Primnoisidinae. This subfamily united Mopsea with Primnoisis and Acanthoisis based on a high degree of branching, polyp shape, and large sclerites, the latter being arranged in three longitudinal rows on the tentacles. Since Mopseadae had previously been established, the new combination was not accepted and was replaced by Mopseinae two years later in findings from the Challenger expedition. These findings erroneously described new specimens lacking spined internodes as Mopsea encrinula and Mopsea dichotoma (now respectively identified as Pteronisis incerta and Jasminisis zebra).

While a large number of species have since then been assigned to Mopsea, a 1998 study found that the genus as defined was paraphyletic, dividing most of its species between eight other genera. The genus was reduced to M. encrinula and the newly defined M. triaknema.

A 2021 molecular phylogeny showed that the family Isididae, defined on the basis of sclerite-free nodes, was polyphyletic, and divided it into five families. The subfamily Mopseinae was found to be paraphyletic with respect to Circinisidinae, and both were merged into the new family Mopseidae, with Mopsea as the type genus. However, the latter was not included in the molecular study. These findings were supported by a 2022 phylogeny.

=== Type species ===
The type species of Mopsea has been a matter of debate, with both M. encrinula and M. dichotoma being claimed as type species by different authors. The earliest designation of M. verticillata (synonymous with M. encrinula) as the type species by Félix Dujardin in 1846 went mostly unnoticed. While Gray's assignment of later M. dichotoma specimens to Mopsella was accepted, they were considered to be unrelated to the original Isis dichotoma specimens, and most zoologists throughout the late 19th and 20th century considered M. dichotoma to be the type species. An exception was Charles Cleveland Nutting, who independently assigned M. encrinula as the type species in 1910.

The inconsistency was first raised in 1987 by Frederick Bayer and Jeffrey Stefani, writing that the type designated by Milne Edward and Haimes was based on a mistaken identification of a melithaeid specimen, but that the original basis for Lamouroux's description of Mopsea was likely the unrelated Isis dichotoma sensu Lamarck. They stated that a ruling by the International Commission on Zoological Nomenclature (ICZN), both on the type species and on the nature of Mopsea dichotoma sensu Lamouroux, would be necessary to resolve the matter. In 1993, the ICZN ruled in Opinion 1738 that M. encrinula was the type species, referring to its 1846 designation. The decision also confirmed the lectotype of M. encrinula designated by Philip Alderslade in the previous year, but did not rule on the type specimen of M. dichotoma.
