= Sprightly =

Sprightly may refer to:

- Annisis sprightly, a monotypic species of coral
- HMAS Sprightly, a Royal Australian Navy tugboat
- HMS Sprightly, various ships of the Royal Navy
- RV Sprightly, an Australian research ship
- Sprightly colilargo, a rodent
- Sprightly Island, an island in Antarctica

== See also ==
- Spratly Islands
