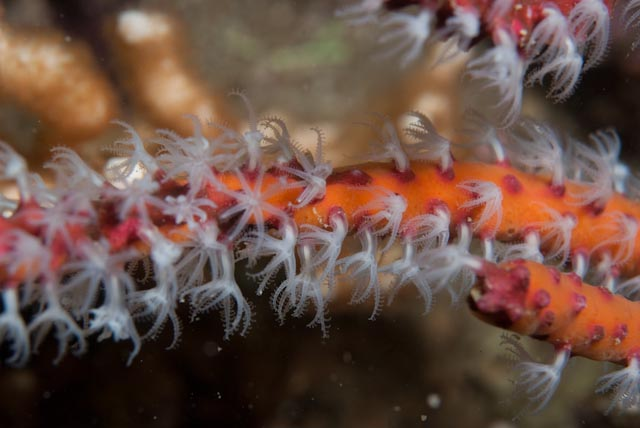

Scientific classification
- Kingdom: Animalia
- Phylum: Cnidaria
- Subphylum: Anthozoa
- Class: Octocorallia
- Order: Scleralcyonacea
- Family: Spongiodermidae
- Genus: Homophyton
- Species: H. verrucosum

Binomial name
- Homophyton verrucosum (Möbius, 1861)

= Gorgonian twig coral =

Species of coral

The gorgonian twig coral (Homphyton verrucosum) is a species of gorgonian sea fan in the family Anthothelidae.

== Description ==
This coral grows as finger-like branches which may be single or relatively unbranched. The polyps are numerous and cover the entire colony except for the basal region. It is variably coloured in red, yellow or orange.

== Distribution ==
This sea fan is found only around the South African coast from False Bay to Sodwana in 20–40 m of water. It is endemic to this region.

== Ecology ==
This coral is often found covered with an unidentified encrusting sponge.
