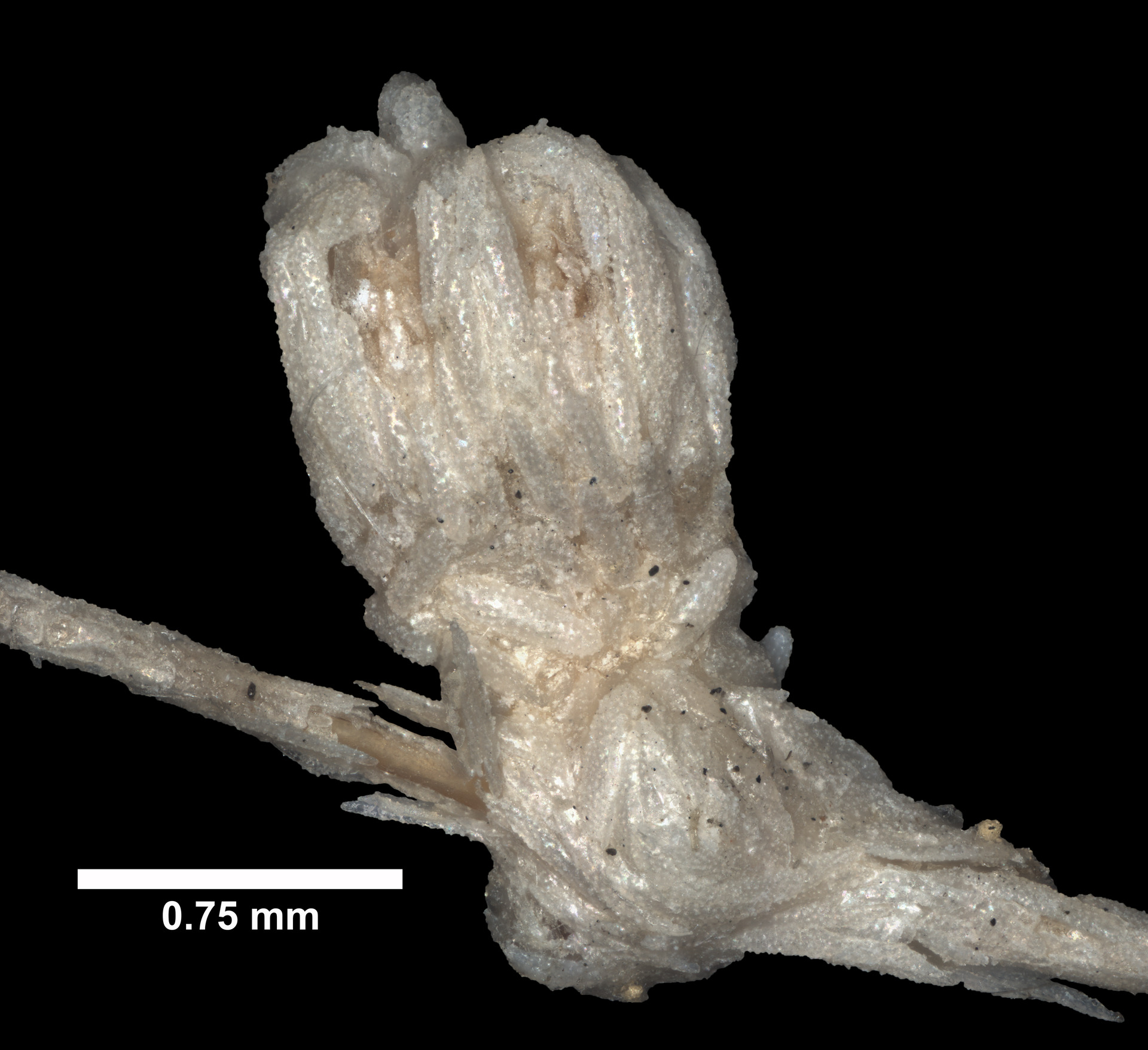

Scientific classification
- Kingdom: Animalia
- Phylum: Cnidaria
- Subphylum: Anthozoa
- Class: Octocorallia
- Order: Scleralcyonacea
- Family: Chrysogorgiidae
- Genus: Chrysogorgia
- Species: C. elegans

Binomial name
- Chrysogorgia elegans (Verrill 1883)

Synonyms
- Chrysogorgia affinis Versluys, 1902; Dasygorgia elegans Verrill, 1883; Dasygorgia spiculosa Verrill, 1883

= Chrysogorgia elegans =

Species of coral

Chrysogorgia elegans is a species of soft coral in the family Chrysogorgiidae. It is found in the Gulf of Mexico, the Mediterranean Sea and the North Atlantic Ocean. Soft coral can also be referred to as sea fans, sea whips, sea feathers, and sea pens.

== Distribution ==
Soft coral have been discovered on the gulf of Mexico, the Mediterranean Sea, North Atlantic Ocean, Saint Lucia, and in the United States. However, Chrysogorgia elegans has been reported only in a few locations. It have mostly been found on the northern and eastern coast of the gulf of Mexico, the Florida Keys, and on the northwestern coast of Cuba. They are prevalent in deep waters. About 75% of this species have been discovered there. They can be found on both hard bottoms and soft sediments.

== Description ==
Chrysogorgia elegans lacks a hard external skeleton. This species of soft coral originated around an axis. The axis is made up of scleroprotein with non-spicular crystalline calcium carbonate arranged in concentric layers. Polyps of these types of corals are connected by a sheet of tissue called coenosarc. These polyps range in size from 1–3 mm in diameter. Soft coral is categorized by slow growth, late maturity, and longevity.

== Reproduction ==
Soft corals are able to produce both sexually and asexually. When a new polyp grows off an already existing polyp it is considered to be asexual reproduction. This process is referred to as budding. This reproduction method happens to be the most common among Chrysogorgia elegans. However, sexual reproduction also occurs in this species. The sexual reproduction process is known as either brooding or spawning. An egg is released by a female and sperm is released by males in a spawning event. Sperm that is released by a male and captured by a female polyp that already contains eggs is known as brooding.

== Diet ==
Most soft corals such as Chrysogorgia elegans depend on a symbiotic relation with Zooxanthellae, which is an alga that lives with soft corals. This relationship gives the corals the ability for photosynthesis to take place, which allows these corals to produce energy. They also depend on the ingestion of phytoplankton as well as zooplankton and other small algae, they do so through absorption.

== Uses ==
Chrysogorgia elegans is a rare species that has yet to be studied in depth. This is due to the lack of spotting of this species in the oceans. As of now the sole purpose upon discovery of this species is used for research purposes. Soft corals are toxic to humans. They contain a chemical called palytoxin, which is poisonous to the human body.
