= Iridogorgia chewbacca =

Scientific classification
- Kingdom: Animalia
- Phylum: Cnidaria
- Subphylum: Anthozoa
- Class: Octocorallia
- Order: Scleralcyonacea
- Family: Chrysogorgiidae
- Genus: Iridogorgia
- Species: I. chewbacca

Binomial name
- Iridogorgia chewbacca Xu, Watling, Zhan & Xu, 2025

Species of coral

Iridogorgia chewbacca is a species of deep-sea bamboo coral in the family Chrysogorgiidae. Named after the Star Wars character Chewbacca due to its long, flexible, "hairy" branches, the species was formally described in 2025. It inhabits rocky seafloors in the tropical western Pacific Ocean at depths exceeding 400 meters, where it forms solitary colonies up to 1.2 meters tall.

== Description ==
Iridogorgia chewbacca has a monopodial, spiral axis typical of its genus, with an iridescence that gives it a shimmering appearance under light. The colony grows upright and solitary, reaching heights of ~1.2 meters (4 feet) in specimens from near Molokaʻi, Hawaii, while those near the Mariana Trench measure around 50 cm (20 inches). Its branches are long and flexible, stretching up to 38 cm (15 inches), hanging downward in a "shaggy" manner that resembles hair, distinguishing it from stiffer-branched relatives. The polyps, numbering thousands per colony, extend tentacles for filter-feeding and give the branches a fuzzy texture when active. Unlike many corals that form dense reefs, I. chewbacca occurs scattered and alone on hard substrates, with its shiny, iridescent surface reflecting light in patterns akin to "fireworks exploding from the seafloor". Genetic markers, including mtMutS-cox1 and 28S rDNA, confirm its distinction from congeners, though mtMutS showed limited utility for delimitation within the genus. Spiral growth direction (clockwise or counter-clockwise) does not serve as a reliable taxonomic trait.

== Taxonomy ==
Iridogorgia chewbacca belongs to the genus Iridogorgia, in the family Chrysogorgiidae, order Malacalcyonacea, class Octocorallia, phylum Cnidaria. The genus comprises deep-sea gorgonians with monopodial axes and iridescent branches, first described from Atlantic specimens but now known for high diversity in the Pacific, with at least 14 species, 10 in the tropical western Pacific. The species was described in 2025 by Y. Xu, L. Watling, Z. Zhan, and K. Xu in a study analyzing 12 Pacific specimens using morphology and molecular data. It was differentiated from similar species like I. laevis by branch flexibility and polyp arrangement. The name "chewbacca" honors the Star Wars character for the colony's furry silhouette, a practice common in taxonomy to aid memorability. No subspecies are recognized.

== Discovery ==
Specimens of I. chewbacca were first documented in 2006 during a remotely operated vehicle (ROV) survey off Molokaʻi, Hawaii, by the Hawaii Undersea Research Laboratory. A second sighting occurred in 2016 near the Mariana Trench during NOAA's Deepwater Exploration of the Marianas expedition, captured in archival footage. Watling identified the distinct traits while reviewing footage years later. The 2025 Zootaxa paper formalized the description, co-authored with Chinese researchers, using genetic sequencing and morphological analysis of preserved samples. The discovery highlighted ongoing biodiversity in explored regions, with Watling noting the "unforgettable" resemblance to Chewbacca.

== Distribution and habitat ==
Iridogorgia chewbacca resides in the tropical western Pacific Ocean, documented off Hawaii (Molokaʻi) and near the Mariana Trench at depths of 400–1,000 meters on rocky bottoms. It prefers hard substrates in the mesopelagic zone, below the sunlit photic layer, where currents deliver organic material. The species is solitary, with colonies spaced widely, contributing to its rarity in surveys. Iridogorgia spans the Pacific and Atlantic, but I. chewbacca appears endemic to the western Pacific hotspot. Potential range extension awaits further ROV explorations in seamounts and trenches.

== Ecology ==
As a suspension feeder, I. chewbacca relies on polyps to capture plankton and organic detritus from deep currents. Its flexible branches maximize particle encounter in low-flow environments. Colonies host microbial communities and may shelter small invertebrates, though specific symbionts have not been studied. Growth is slow, potentially spanning centuries, as seen in related Iridogorgia species up to 500 years old. Reproduction among gorgonians, including I. chewbacca, likely involves fragmentation and spawning, typical of octocorals. It contributes to deep-sea biodiversity by stabilizing sediments and providing microhabitats.

== Conservation ==
Deep-sea corals (I. chewbacca) face threats from ocean acidification, warming, and deep-sea mining, which disrupt habitats.
