= Myriozotisis =

Scientific classification
- Kingdom: Animalia
- Phylum: Cnidaria
- Subphylum: Anthozoa
- Class: Octocorallia
- Order: Scleralcyonacea
- Family: Mopseidae
- Genus: Myriozotisis; Alderslade, 1998

Species
- Myriozotisis heatherae; Myriozotisis spinosa

Genus of corals

Myriozotisis is a genus of coral in the family Mopseidae. The type species is Myriozotisis heatherae, and the one other identified species is Myriozotisis spinoza. The name refers to the fine branching of the genus, and is composed of the Greek Myrios ("numberless") and ozotos ("branched/branching"), combined with Isis.

== Description ==
The corals reach up to about 16.2 cm in height, and are densely and finely branched. The colonies are planar. Preserved specimens are greyish orange, comparable to the color of new rust. The axial internodes range from being orange-white and translucent in the thicker branches to being orange to orange brown and transparent in the finer ones. They are up to 1.7 mm long in M. spinosa and up to 4.3 mm long in M. heatherae. The nodes of the skeleton are dark brown or orange. Early examples were found somewhat off the coast near Brisbane, Australia.
