= Sclerisis =

Scientific classification
- Kingdom: Animalia
- Phylum: Cnidaria
- Subphylum: Anthozoa
- Class: Octocorallia
- Order: Scleralcyonacea
- Family: Mopseidae
- Genus: Sclerisis; Studer, 1879

Species
- Sclerisis macquariana; Sclerisis pulchella

Genus of corals

Sclerisis is a genus of coral in the family Mopseidae.
