= Australisis =

Scientific classification
- Kingdom: Animalia
- Phylum: Cnidaria
- Subphylum: Anthozoa
- Class: Octocorallia
- Order: Scleralcyonacea
- Family: Mopseidae
- Genus: Australisis; Bayer & Stefani, 1987
- Species: A. sarmentosa

Binomial name
- Australisis sarmentosa Bayer & Stefani, 1987

Genus of corals

Australisis is a genus of deep-sea bamboo coral in the family Mopseidae. It is monotypic with a single species, Australisis sarmentosa.
