= Iotisis =

Scientific classification
- Kingdom: Animalia
- Phylum: Cnidaria
- Subphylum: Anthozoa
- Class: Octocorallia
- Order: Scleralcyonacea
- Family: Mopseidae
- Genus: Iotisis; Alderslade, 1998
- Species: I. alba

Binomial name
- Iotisis alba Nutting, 1910

Genus of corals

Iotisis is a genus of deep-sea bamboo coral in the family Mopseidae. It is monotypic with a single species, Iotisis alba.
