= Tethrisis =

Scientific classification
- Kingdom: Animalia
- Phylum: Cnidaria
- Subphylum: Anthozoa
- Class: Octocorallia
- Order: Scleralcyonacea
- Family: Mopseidae
- Genus: Tethrisis; Alderslade, 1998
- Species: T. suzannae

Binomial name
- Tethrisis suzannae Alderslade, 1998

Genus of corals

Tethrisis is a genus of deep-sea bamboo coralin the family Mopseidae. It is monotypic with a single species, Tethrisis suzannae.
