= Chathamisis =

Scientific classification
- Kingdom: Animalia
- Phylum: Cnidaria
- Subphylum: Anthozoa
- Class: Octocorallia
- Order: Scleralcyonacea
- Family: Mopseidae
- Genus: Chathamisis; Grant, 1976

Species
- Chathamisis bayeri; Chathamisis ramosa

Genus of corals

Chathamisis is a genus of coral in the family Mopseidae.
