= Ktenosquamisis =

Scientific classification
- Kingdom: Animalia
- Phylum: Cnidaria
- Subphylum: Anthozoa
- Class: Octocorallia
- Order: Scleralcyonacea
- Family: Mopseidae
- Genus: Ktenosquamisis; Alderslade, 1998
- Species: K. bicamella

Binomial name
- Ktenosquamisis bicamella Alderslade, 1998

Genus of corals

Ktenosquamisis is a genus of deep-sea bamboo coral in the family Mopseidae. It is monotypic with a single species, Ktenosquamisis bicamella.
