= Minuisis =

Scientific classification
- Kingdom: Animalia
- Phylum: Cnidaria
- Subphylum: Anthozoa
- Class: Octocorallia
- Order: Scleralcyonacea
- Family: Mopseidae
- Genus: Minuisis; Grant, 1976

Species
- Minuisis granti; Minuisis pseudoplanum

Genus of corals

Minuisis is a genus of deep-sea bamboo coral in the family Mopseidae.
