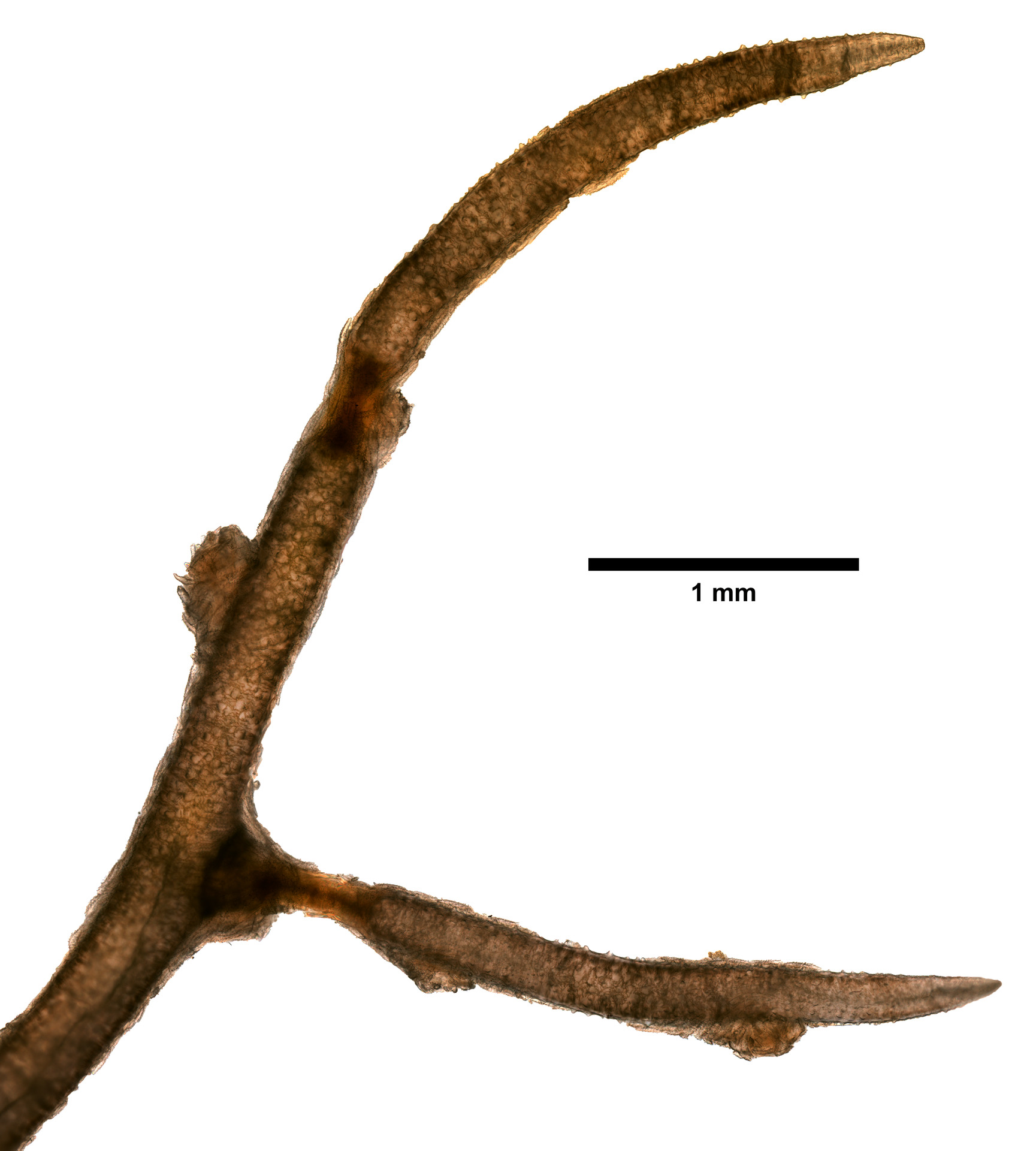
- Stenisis

Scientific classification
- Kingdom: Animalia
- Phylum: Cnidaria
- Subphylum: Anthozoa
- Class: Octocorallia
- Order: Scleralcyonacea
- Family: Mopseidae
- Genus: Stenisis; Bayer & Stefani, 1987
- Species: S. humilis

Binomial name
- Stenisis humilis (Deichmann, 1936)

= Stenisis =

Genus of corals

Stenisis is a genus of deep-sea bamboo coral in the family Mopseidae. It is monotypic with a single species, Stenisis humilis.
