= Circinisis =

Scientific classification
- Kingdom: Animalia
- Phylum: Cnidaria
- Subphylum: Anthozoa
- Class: Octocorallia
- Order: Scleralcyonacea
- Family: Mopseidae
- Genus: Circinisis; Grant, 1976
- Species: C. circinata

Binomial name
- Circinisis circinata Grant, 1976

Genus of corals

Circinisis is a genus of deep-sea bamboo coral in the family Mopseidae. It is monotypic with a single species, Circinisis circinata.
