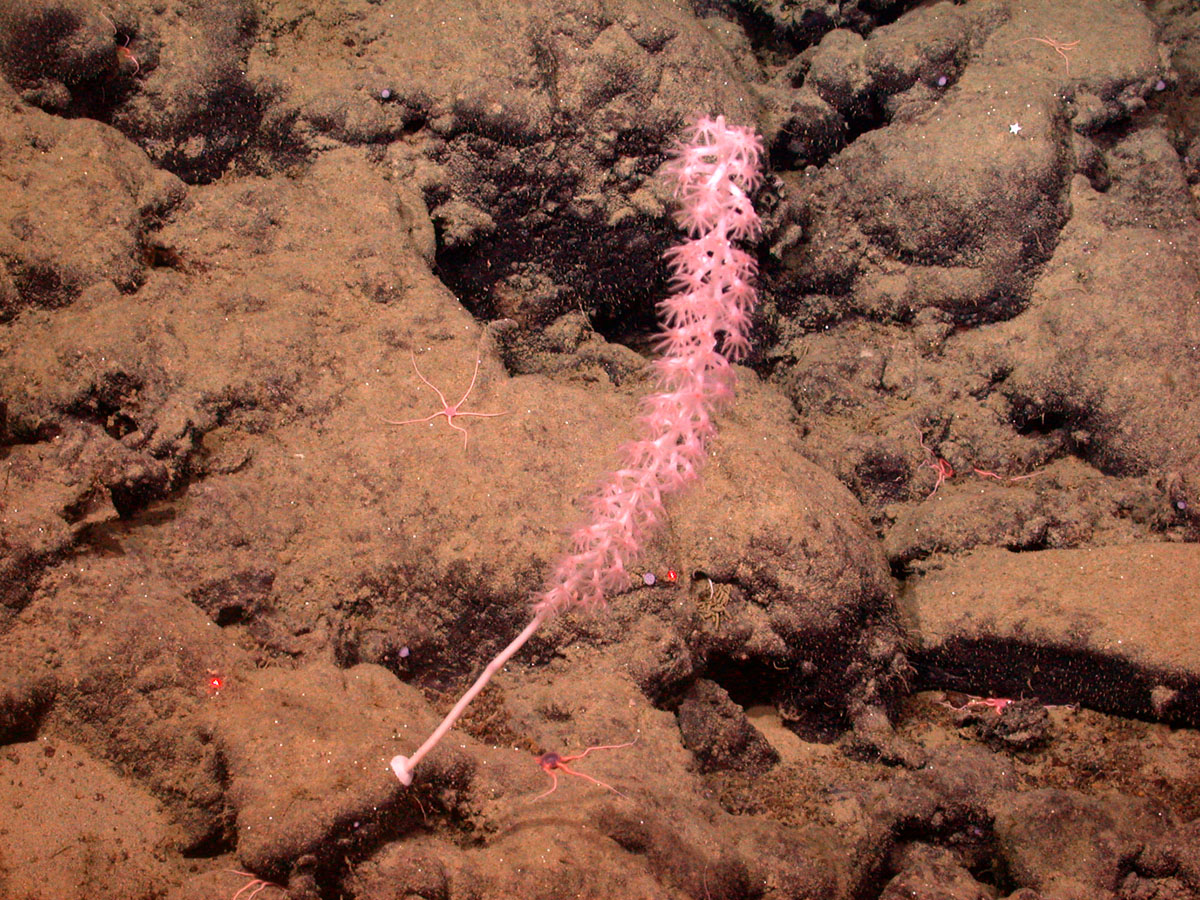
- Lepidisis sp.

Scientific classification
- Kingdom: Animalia
- Phylum: Cnidaria
- Subphylum: Anthozoa
- Class: Octocorallia
- Order: Scleralcyonacea
- Family: Keratoisididae
- Genus: Lepidisis; Verrill, 1883

Species
- See text

= Lepidisis =

Genus of corals

Lepidisis is a genus of deep-sea bamboo coral in the family Keratoisididae.

== Species ==
The genus Lepidisis contains the following species:

- Lepidisis caryophyllia Verrill, 1883
- Lepidisis cyanae Grasshoff, 1986
