= Parisis =

Parisis may refer to:

- Pierre Louis Parisis, Roman Catholic bishop of the Bishopric of Langres from 1835 to 1851
- Parisis, a synonym for the Pays de France region
- Cormeilles-en-Parisis, a commune in the Île-de-France
- The livre parisis (Paris livre (pound)), standard for minting French coins and a unit of account
- Parisis (coral), a genus of coral
