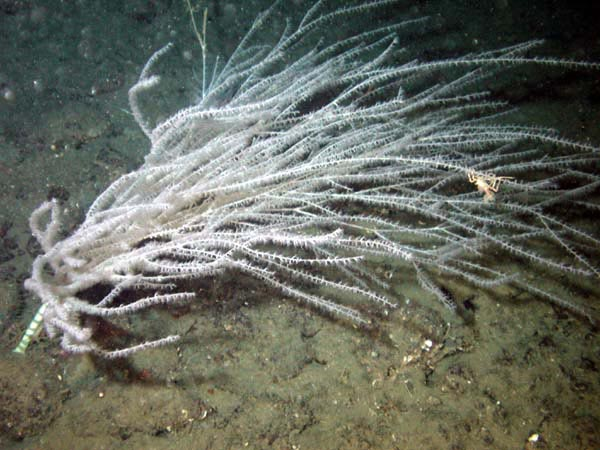

Scientific classification
- Kingdom: Animalia
- Phylum: Cnidaria
- Subphylum: Anthozoa
- Class: Octocorallia
- Order: Scleralcyonacea
- Family: Keratoisididae
- Genus: Acanella; Gray, 1870

Species
- See text

= Acanella =

Genus of corals

Acanella is a genus of deep sea corals of the family Keratoisididae. Acanella are mainly studied and found in Hawaii, they are able to survive in high-flow sites and are preyed upon by nudibranch mollusks. It has a high fecundity and small size that allows high dispersal and recruitment; however, it has been classified as a vulnerable marine organism due to its vulnerability to bottom fishing gear.

== Species ==
It contains the following species:

- Acanella africana Kükenthal, 1915
- Acanella arbuscula (Johnson, 1862)
- Acanella aurelia Saucier & France, 2017
- Acanella chiliensis Wright & Studer, 1889
- Acanella dispar Bayer, 1990
- Acanella furcata Thomson, 1929
- Acanella gregori (Gray, 1870)
- Acanella microspiculata Aurivillius, 1931
- Acanella rigida Wright & Studer, 1889
- Acanella robusta Thomson & Henderson, 1906
- Acanella scarletae Saucier & France, 2017
- Acanella verticillata Kükenthal, 1915
- Acanella weberi Nutting, 1910
