= Paracanthoisis =

Scientific classification
- Kingdom: Animalia
- Phylum: Cnidaria
- Subphylum: Anthozoa
- Class: Octocorallia
- Order: Scleralcyonacea
- Family: Mopseidae
- Genus: Paracanthoisis; Alderslade, 1998

Species
- Paracanthoisis richerdeforgesi; Paracanthoisis simplex

Genus of corals

Paracanthoisis is a genus of deep-sea bamboo coral within the family Mopseidae.
