= Lissopholidisis =

Scientific classification
- Kingdom: Animalia
- Phylum: Cnidaria
- Subphylum: Anthozoa
- Class: Octocorallia
- Order: Scleralcyonacea
- Family: Mopseidae
- Genus: Lissopholidisis; Alderslade, 1998

Species
- Lissopholidisis ampliflora; Lissopholidisis furcula; Lissopholidisis nuttingi

Genus of corals

Lissopholidisis is a genus of deep-sea bamboo coral in the family Mopseidae.
