= Echinisis =

Scientific classification
- Kingdom: Animalia
- Phylum: Cnidaria
- Subphylum: Anthozoa
- Class: Octocorallia
- Order: Scleralcyonacea
- Family: Mopseidae
- Genus: Echinisis; Thomson & Rennet, 1932

Species
- Echinisis armata; Echinisis eltanin; Echinisis persephone; Echinisis spicata; Echinisis vema

Genus of corals

Echinisis is a genus of coral in the family Mopseidae.
