= Caribisis =

Scientific classification
- Kingdom: Animalia
- Phylum: Cnidaria
- Subphylum: Anthozoa
- Class: Octocorallia
- Order: Scleralcyonacea
- Family: Mopseidae
- Genus: Caribisis; Bayer & Stefani, 1987
- Species: C. simplex

Binomial name
- Caribisis simplex Bayer & Stefani, 1987

Genus of corals

Caribisis is a genus of deep-sea bamboo coral in the family Mopseidae. It is monotypic with a single species, Caribisis simplex.
