= Peltastisis =

Scientific classification
- Kingdom: Animalia
- Phylum: Cnidaria
- Subphylum: Anthozoa
- Class: Octocorallia
- Order: Scleralcyonacea
- Family: Mopseidae
- Genus: Peltastisis; Nutting, 1910

Species
- See text

Genus of corals

Peltastisis is a genus of deep-sea bamboo coral in the family Mopseidae. There are two species recognized:

- Peltastisis cornuta Nutting, 1910
- Peltastisis uniserialis Nutting, 1910
