= Orstomisis =

Scientific classification
- Kingdom: Animalia
- Phylum: Cnidaria
- Subphylum: Anthozoa
- Class: Octocorallia
- Order: Scleralcyonacea
- Family: Keratoisididae
- Genus: Orstomisis; Bayer, 1990
- Species: O. crosnieri

Binomial name
- Orstomisis crosnieri Bayer, 1990

Genus of corals

Orstomisis is a genus of deep-sea bamboo coral in the family Keratoisididae. It is monotypic with a single species, Orstomisis crosnieri. It is distributed across the Pacific, with populations near Polynesia, Micronesia, and as far north as Atka Island.
