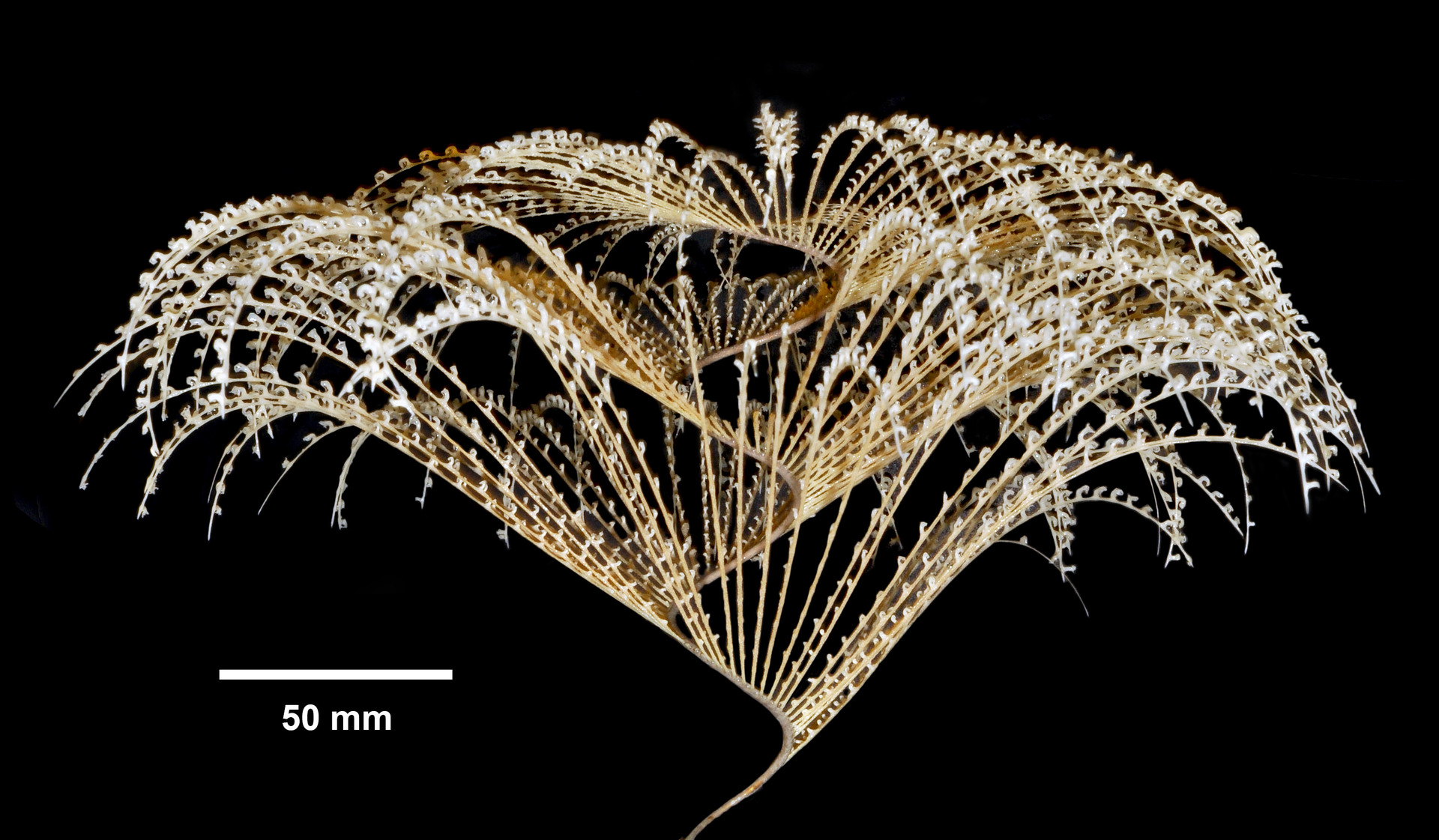
- Iridogorgia fontinalis
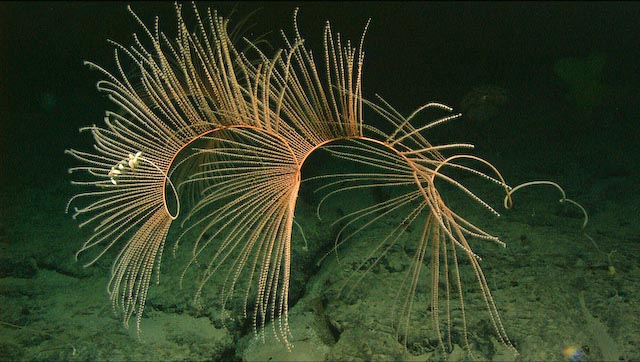
- Iridogorgia magnispiralis

Scientific classification
- Kingdom: Animalia
- Phylum: Cnidaria
- Subphylum: Anthozoa
- Class: Octocorallia
- Order: Scleralcyonacea
- Family: Chrysogorgiidae
- Genus: Iridogorgia; Verrill, 1883

Type species
- Iridogorgia pourtalesii Verrill, 1883

Synonyms
- Rhodaniridogorgia Watling, 2007

= Iridogorgia =

Genus of soft coral

Iridogorgia is a genus of soft coral that belongs to the family Chrysogorgiidae. It is native to the Atlantic and Pacific Oceans. It lives in deep sea environments and is characterized by its large spiral shape with longs and relatable branches attached to it.

== Distribution ==
Species are present in both the Atlantic and Pacific Oceans with two species being predominantly found in the Northern Atlantic Ocean and nine species being restricted to the Pacific Ocean. In the North Atlantic, four species can be found that predominantly inhabit seamounts. They are I. pourtalesii, I. magnispiralis, I. splendens and I. fontinalis. A few species have been recorded to inhabit the coast of the Hawaiian islands such as I. superba, I. bella and I. magnispiralis. The diversity of this genus in the western Pacific Ocean is poorly known. Species that are distributed across both oceans include I. magnispiralis, I. fontinalis, and I. splendens.

It is a genus that lives in the deep sea at depths of 558–2311 meters.

== Description ==
It is characterized by an upright-spiraling monopodial axis with long and flexible, unbranched branches arising from one side of the spiral. Many of these branches have brilliant iridescent features. They are usually large in size.

== Taxonomy ==
Iridogorgia was described in 1883 by Verrill from collected specimens from coastal expeditions of the southeastern United States and West Indies. The original specimen was collected from Dominica at a depth of 991 meters. In 1908, Nutting described two species that were collected in dredge hauls of the coast of the main Hawaiian Islands by the US Fish Commission Steamer ‘Albatross’. The first species, I. superba, was nearly complete while the second, I. bella, was severely damaged with only a few branches left attached.

=== Species ===
This genus currently contains 16 described species. They are listed below:

1. Iridogorgia acutisclerita Ge, Zhang & Xu., 2026
2. Iridogorgia bella Nutting, 1908
3. Iridogorgia chewbacca Xu, Watling & Xu in Xu et al., 2025
4. Iridogorgia curva Xu, Watling & Xu in Xu et al., 2025
5. Iridogorgia densispicula Xu, Zhan, Li & Xu, 2020
6. Iridogorgia densispiralis Xu, Zhan & Xu, 2021
7. Iridogorgia flexilis Xu, Zhan & Xu, 2021
8. Iridogorgia fontinalis Watling, 2007
9. Iridogorgia fragilis (Watling, 2007)
10. Iridogorgia levisquama Ge, Zhang & Xu., 2026
11. Iridogorgia magnispiralis Watling, 2007
12. Iridogorgia pourtalesii Verrill, 1883
13. Iridogorgia splendens Watling, 2007
14. Iridogorgia squarrosa Xu, Zhan, Li & Xu, 2020
15. Iridogorgia superba Nutting, 1908
16. Iridogorgia verrucosa Xu, Zhan & Xu, 2021

=== Synonyms ===
Rhodaniridogorgia is currently considered to be a taxonomic synonym of the genus Iridogorgia. It was described along with I. magnispiralis by Watling in 2007 based on the wavy axis. However later morphological and phylogenetic analyses supports Rhodaniridogorgia (now I. superba) being a synonym of this genus.
