= Gorgonisis =

Scientific classification
- Kingdom: Animalia
- Phylum: Cnidaria
- Subphylum: Anthozoa
- Class: Octocorallia
- Order: Scleralcyonacea
- Family: Mopseidae
- Genus: Gorgonisis; Alderslade, 1998
- Species: G. elyakovi

Binomial name
- Gorgonisis elyakovi Alderslade, 1998

Genus of corals

Gorgonisis is a genus of coral in the family Mopseidae. It is monotypic with a single species, Gorgonisis elyakovi.
