= Bathygorgia =

Scientific classification
- Kingdom: Animalia
- Phylum: Cnidaria
- Subphylum: Anthozoa
- Class: Octocorallia
- Order: Scleralcyonacea
- Family: Keratoisididae
- Genus: Bathygorgia; Wright, 1885

Type species
- Bathygorgia profunda Wright, 1885

Genus of coral

Bathygorgia is a genus of deep-sea bamboo coral in the family Keratoisididae.

Three species are assigned to this genus:

- Bathygorgia profunda Wright, 1885
- Bathygorgia abyssicola Lapointe & Watling, 2015
- Bathygorgia tasmaniensis Lapointe & Watling, 2015
