= Florectisis =

Scientific classification
- Kingdom: Animalia
- Phylum: Cnidaria
- Subphylum: Anthozoa
- Class: Octocorallia
- Order: Scleralcyonacea
- Family: Mopseidae
- Genus: Florectisis; Alderslade, 1998
- Species: F. rosetta

Binomial name
- Florectisis rosetta Alderslade, 1998

Genus of corals

Florectisis is a genus of coral in the family Mopseidae. It is monotypic with a single species, Florectisis rosetta.
