= Keratoisis =

Scientific classification
- Kingdom: Animalia
- Phylum: Cnidaria
- Subphylum: Anthozoa
- Class: Octocorallia
- Order: Scleralcyonacea
- Family: Keratoisididae
- Genus: Keratoisis; Wright, 1869

Species
- See text

Genus of corals

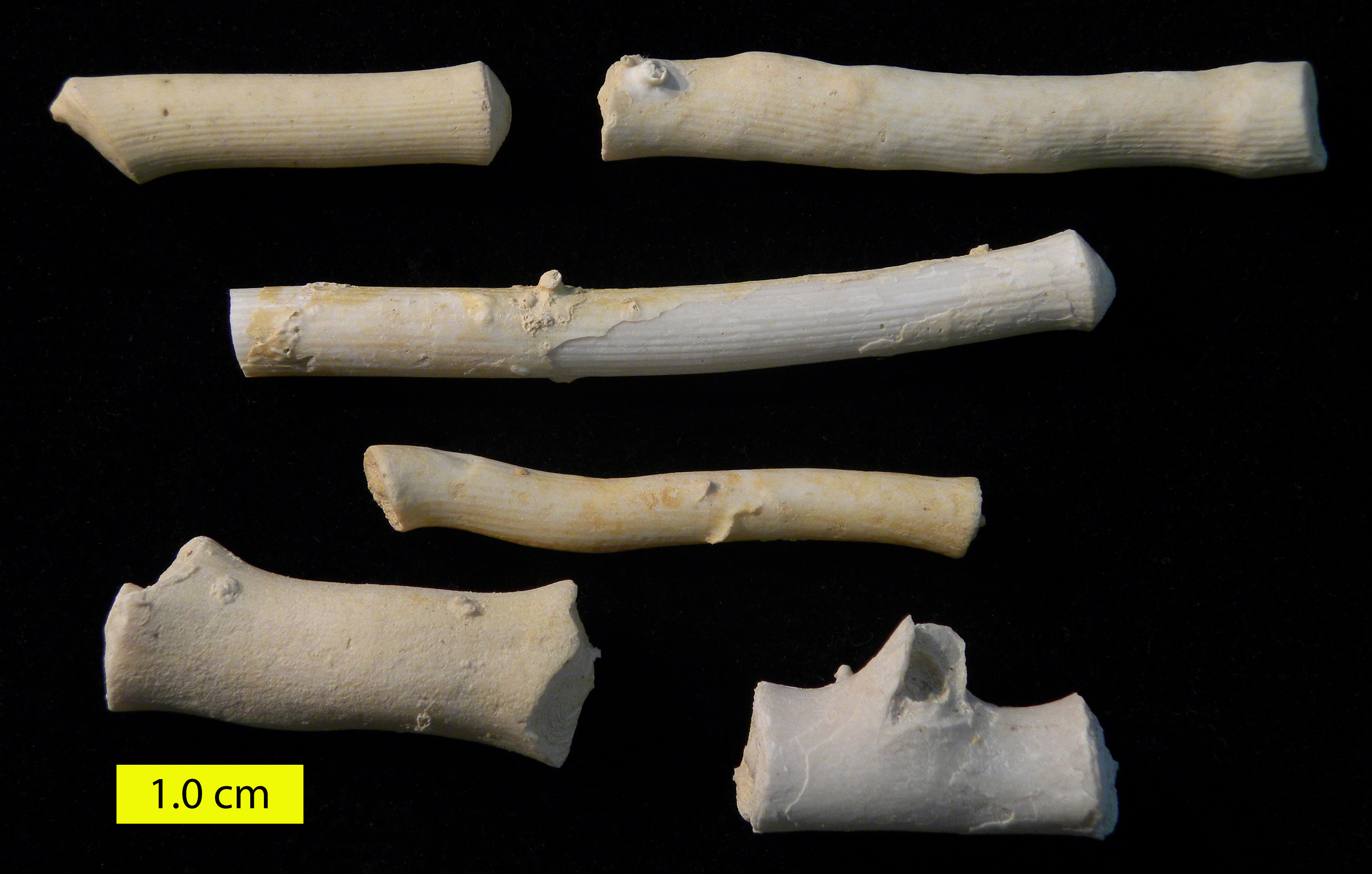
Fragments of Keratoisis melitensis (Goldfuss, 1826) from the Lower Pleistocene of Cape Milazzo, Sicily, Italy.

Keratoisis is a genus of deep-sea bamboo coral in the family Keratosididae, containing the following species:

- Keratoisis chuni (Kükenthal, 1915)
- Keratoisis flabellum (Nutting, 1908)
- Keratoisis flexibilis (Pourtales, 1868)
- Keratoisis glaesa (Grant, 1976)
- Keratoisis gracilis (Thomson & Henderson, 1906)
- Keratoisis grandiflora Studer, 1878
- Keratoisis grandis (Nutting, 1908)
- Keratoisis grayi (Wright, 1869)
- Keratoisis hikurangiensis (Grant, 1976)
- Keratoisis japonica Studer, 1878
- Keratoisis macrospiculata (Kükenthal, 1915)
- Keratoisis magnifica Dueñas, Alderslade & Sánchez, 2014
- Keratoisis microspiculata Molander, 1929
- Keratoisis palmae (Wright & Studer, 1889)
- Keratoisis paucispinosa (Wright & Studer, 1889)
- Keratoisis peara Dueñas, Alderslade & Sánchez, 2014
- Keratoisis philippinensis (Wright & Studer, 1889)
- Keratoisis projecta (Grant, 1976)
- Keratoisis siemensii Studer, 1878
- Keratoisis squarrosa (Kükenthal, 1915)
- Keratoisis tangentis (Grant, 1976)
- Keratoisis wrighti (Nutting, 1910)
- Keratoisis zelandica (Grant, 1976)
