= Oparinisis =

Scientific classification
- Kingdom: Animalia
- Phylum: Cnidaria
- Subphylum: Anthozoa
- Class: Octocorallia
- Order: Scleralcyonacea
- Family: Mopseidae
- Genus: Oparinisis; Alderslade, 1998

Species
- Oparinisis flexilis; Oparinisis parkeri; Oparinisis viking

Genus of corals

Oparinisis is a genus of coral in the family Mopseidae.
