= Pangolinisis =

Scientific classification
- Kingdom: Animalia
- Phylum: Cnidaria
- Subphylum: Anthozoa
- Class: Octocorallia
- Order: Scleralcyonacea
- Family: Mopseidae
- Genus: Pangolinisis; Alderslade, 1998
- Species: P. cia

Binomial name
- Pangolinisis cia Alderslade, 1998

Genus of corals

Pangolinisis is a genus of deep-sea bamboo coral in the family Mopseidae. It is monotypic with a single species, Pangolinisis cia.
