= Tenuisis =

Scientific classification
- Kingdom: Animalia
- Phylum: Cnidaria
- Subphylum: Anthozoa
- Class: Octocorallia
- Order: Scleralcyonacea
- Family: Mopseidae
- Genus: Tenuisis; Bayer & Stefani, 1987
- Species: T. microspiculata

Binomial name
- Tenuisis microspiculata (Molander, 1929)

Genus of corals

Tenuisis is a genus of deep-sea bamboo coral in the family Mopseidae. It is monotypic with a single species, Tenuisis microspiculata.
