= Jasminisis =

Scientific classification
- Kingdom: Animalia
- Phylum: Cnidaria
- Subphylum: Anthozoa
- Class: Octocorallia
- Order: Scleralcyonacea
- Family: Mopseidae
- Genus: Jasminisis; Alderslade, 1998

Species
- Jasminisis candelabra; Jasminisis cavatica; Jasminisis deceptrix; Jasminisis zebra

Genus of corals

Jasminisis is a genus of deep-sea bamboo coral in the family Mopseidae.
