= Acanthoisis =

Scientific classification
- Kingdom: Animalia
- Phylum: Cnidaria
- Subphylum: Anthozoa
- Class: Octocorallia
- Order: Scleralcyonacea
- Family: Mopseidae
- Genus: Acanthoisis; Studer, 1887

Genus of corals

Acanthoisis is a genus of deep-sea bamboo coral of the family Mopseidae. It contains five species.

== Species ==
Acanthoisis contains the following species:

- Acanthoisis dhondtae Bayer & Stefani, 1987
- Acanthoisis flabellum Wright & Studer, 1889
- Acanthoisis kimbla Alderslade, 1998
- Acanthoisis myzourida Alderslade, 1998
- Acanthoisis wrastica Alderslade, 1998
