= Pleurogorgia =

Scientific classification
- Domain: Eukaryota
- Kingdom: Animalia
- Phylum: Cnidaria
- Subphylum: Anthozoa
- Class: Octocorallia
- Order: Alcyonacea
- Family: Chrysogorgiidae
- Genus: Pleurogorgia; Versluys, 1902

Genus of corals

Pleurogorgia is a genus of corals belonging to the family Chrysogorgiidae.

The species of this genus are found in Pacific Ocean.

Species:

- Pleurogorgia militaris Nutting, 1908
- Pleurogorgia plana Versluys, 1902
