= Diodogorgia =

Scientific classification
- Kingdom: Animalia
- Phylum: Cnidaria
- Subphylum: Anthozoa
- Class: Octocorallia
- Order: Scleralcyonacea
- Family: Spongiodermidae
- Genus: Diodogorgia; Kükenthal, 1919

Genus of cnidarian

Diodogorgia is a genus of cnidarians belonging to the family Spongiodermidae. It was first described by Willy Kükenthal in 1919.

As of May 2026, the World Register of Marine Species recognizes three species:

- Diodogorgia capensis (J.S. Thomson, 1911)
- Diodogorgia nodulifera (Hargitt in Hargitt & Rogers, 1901)
- Diodogorgia sibogae Stiasny, 1941
