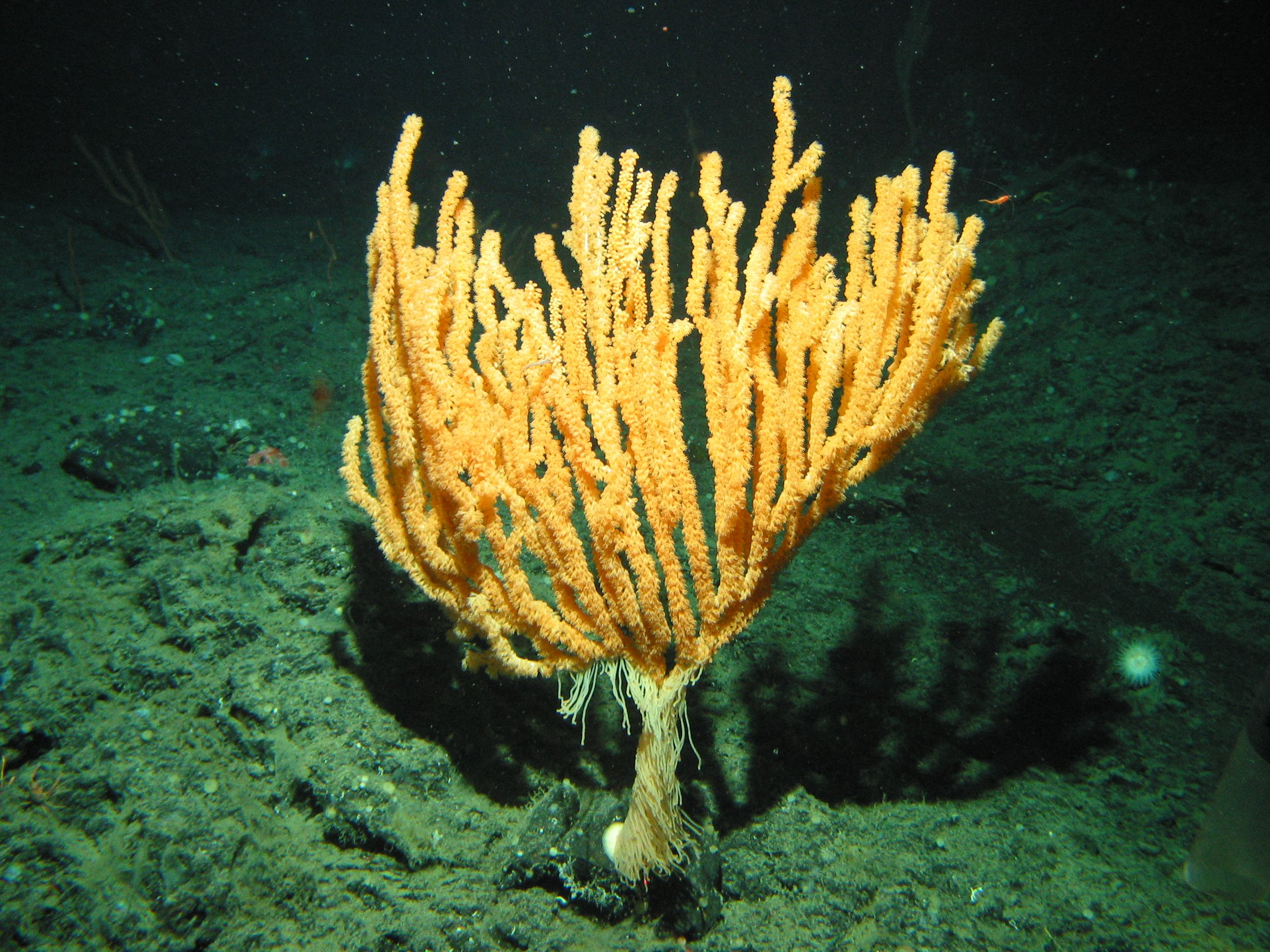
- Isidella tentaculum (Gulf of Alaska)

Scientific classification
- Kingdom: Animalia
- Phylum: Cnidaria
- Subphylum: Anthozoa
- Class: Octocorallia
- Order: Scleralcyonacea
- Family: Keratoisididae; Gray, 1870

= Keratoisididae =

Family of corals

Keratoisididae is a family of octocorals belonging to the order Scleralcyonacea. Many bamboo corals are members of this family.

== Genera ==
The family Keratoisididae contains the following genera according to the World Register of Marine Species:

- Acanella Gray, 1870
- Adinisis Lapointe & Watling, 2022
- Aethisis Xu, Lu & Xu in Xu et al., 2024
- Bathygorgia Wright, 1885
- Cladarisis Watling, 2015
- Dentatisis Xu, Watling & Xu in Xu et al., 2024
- Dokidisis Lapointe & Watling, 2022
- Eknomisis Watling & France, 2011
- Explorisis Morrissey, Allcock & Quattrini, 2024
- Isidella Gray, 1857
- Jasonisis Alderslade & McFadden, 2012
- Keratoisis Wright, 1869
- Lepidisis Verrill, 1883
- Onkoisis Lapointe & Watling, 2022
- Orstomisis Bayer, 1990
- Parajasonisis Xu, Watling & Xu in Xu et al., 2024
- Tanyostea Lapointe & Watling, 2022
- Tridentisis France & Watling, 2024
