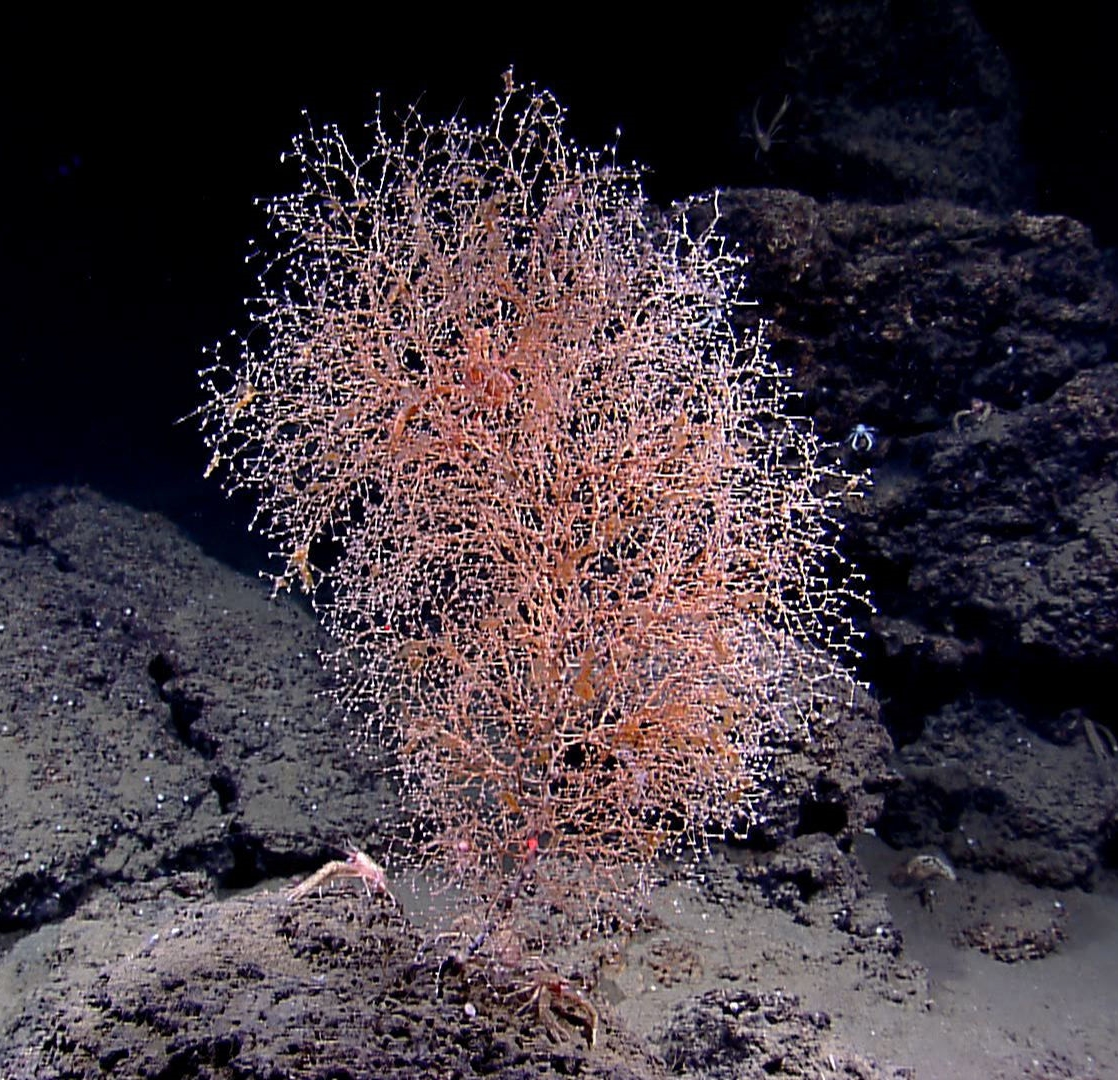
- Chrysogorgia sp.

Scientific classification
- Kingdom: Animalia
- Phylum: Cnidaria
- Subphylum: Anthozoa
- Class: Octocorallia
- Order: Scleralcyonacea
- Family: Chrysogorgiidae
- Genus: Chrysogorgia; Duchassaing & Michelotti 1864

Synonyms
- Dasygorgia

= Chrysogorgia =

Genus of corals

Chrysogorgia is a genus of soft corals in the family Chrysogorgiidae.

== Species ==
- Chrysogorgia abludo Pante & Watling, 2011
- Chrysogorgia acanthella (Wright & Studer, 1889)
- Chrysogorgia agassizii (Verrill, 1883)
- Chrysogorgia anastomosans Versluys, 1902
- Chrysogorgia arborescens Nutting, 1908
- Chrysogorgia arboriformis Xu, Zhan & Xu, 2023
- Chrysogorgia artospira Pante & Watling, 2011
- Chrysogorgia averta Pante & Watling, 2011
- Chrysogorgia axillaris (Wright & Studer, 1889)
- Chrysogorgia campanula Madsen, 1944
- Chrysogorgia carolinensis Xu, Zhan & Xu, 2020
- Chrysogorgia cavea Kinoshita, 1913
- Chrysogorgia comans Kinoshita, 1913
- Chrysogorgia constricta Hiles, 1899
- Chrysogorgia cupressa (Wright & Studer, 1889)
- Chrysogorgia curvata Versluys, 1902
- Chrysogorgia cylindrata Xu, Zhan & Xu, 2023
- Chrysogorgia debilis Kükenthal, 1908
- Chrysogorgia delicata Nutting, 1908
- Chrysogorgia dendritica Xu, Zhan & Xu, 2020
- Chrysogorgia desbonni Duchassaing & Michelotti, 1864
- Chrysogorgia dichotoma Thomson & Henderson, 1906
- Chrysogorgia dispersa Kükenthal, 1908
- Chrysogorgia elegans (Verrill, 1883)
- Chrysogorgia excavata Kükenthal, 1908
- Chrysogorgia fewkesii Verrill, 1883
- Chrysogorgia flavescens Nutting, 1908
- Chrysogorgia flexilis (Wright & Studer, 1889)
- Chrysogorgia fragilis Xu, Zhan & Xu, 2020
- Chrysogorgia fruticosa (Studer, 1894)
- Chrysogorgia geniculata (Wright & Studer, 1889)
- Chrysogorgia gracilis Xu, Zhan & Xu, 2020
- Chrysogorgia herdendorfi Cairns, 2001
- Chrysogorgia indica Thomson & Henderson, 1906
- Chrysogorgia intermedia Versluys, 1902
- Chrysogorgia irregularis Thomson & Henderson, 1906
- Chrysogorgia japonica (Wright & Studer, 1889)
- Chrysogorgia laevorsa Cairns, 2018
- Chrysogorgia lata Versluys, 1902
- Chrysogorgia lunae Baena, Martell, Soto-Angel, Ambroso & López-González, 2024
- Chrysogorgia midas Cairns, 2018
- Chrysogorgia minuta Kinoshita, 1913
- Chrysogorgia mixta Versluys, 1902
- Chrysogorgia monticola Cairns, 2007
- Chrysogorgia multiflora Deichmann, 1936
- Chrysogorgia okinosensis Kinoshita, 1913
- Chrysogorgia orientalis Versluys, 1902
- Chrysogorgia papillosa Kinoshita, 1913
- Chrysogorgia pellucida Kükenthal, 1908
- Chrysogorgia pendula Versluys, 1902
- Chrysogorgia pentasticha Versluys, 1902
- Chrysogorgia pinnata Cairns, 2007
- Chrysogorgia pinniformis Xu, Zhan & Xu, 2021
- Chrysogorgia pugnioides (Ge et al., 2026)
- Chrysogorgia pusilla Versluys, 1902
- Chrysogorgia pyramidalis Kükenthal, 1908
- Chrysogorgia quadruplex Thomson, 1927
- Chrysogorgia ramificans Xu, Li, Zhan & Xu, 2019
- Chrysogorgia ramosa Versluys, 1902
- Chrysogorgia rigida Versluys, 1902
- Chrysogorgia rotunda Kinoshita, 1913
- Chrysogorgia sibogae Versluys, 1902
- Chrysogorgia sphaerica Aurivillius, 1931
- Chrysogorgia tetrasticha Versluys, 1902
- Chrysogorgia thyrsiformis Deichmann, 1936
- Chrysogorgia tricaulis Pante & Watling, 2011
- Chrysogorgia tuberculata Cordeiro, Castro & Pérez, 2015
- Chrysogorgia upsilonia Cordeiro, Castro & Pérez, 2015
- Chrysogorgia varians Xu, Zhan & Xu, 2021
