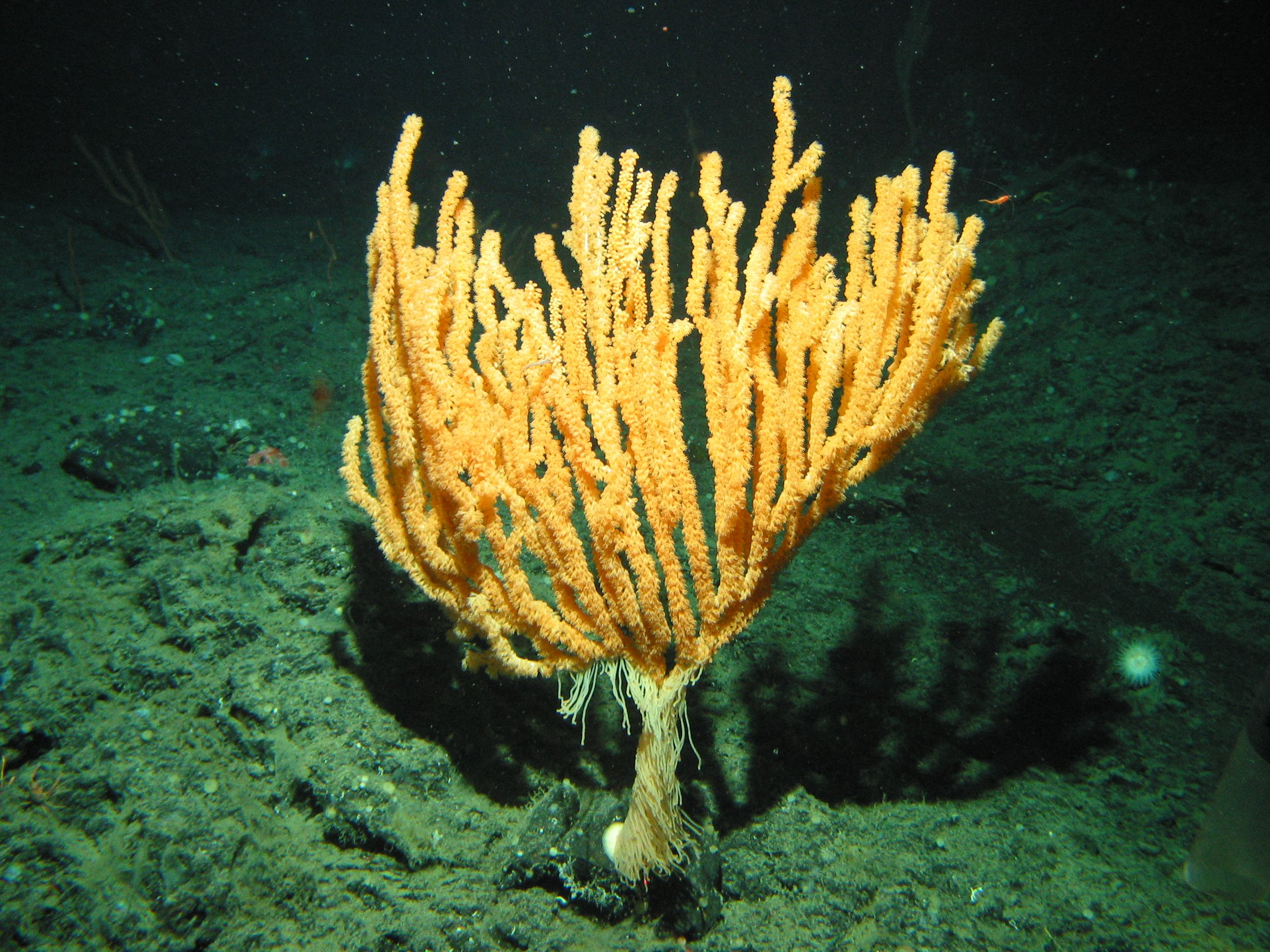
- Isidella tentaculum

Scientific classification
- Kingdom: Animalia
- Phylum: Cnidaria
- Subphylum: Anthozoa
- Class: Octocorallia
- Order: Scleralcyonacea
- Family: Keratoisididae
- Genus: Isidella; Gray, 1857

Species
- See text

= Isidella =

Genus of corals

Isidella is a genus of deep-sea bamboo coral in the family Keratoisididae.

== Species ==
According to the World Register of Marine Species, six species are recognized:

- Isidella elongata (Esper, 1788)
- Isidella lofotensis Sars, 1868
- Isidella longiflora (Verrill, 1883)
- Isidella tentaculum Etnoyer, 2008
- Isidella tenuis Cairns, 2018
- Isidella trichotoma Bayer, 1990
