= Pteronisis =

Scientific classification
- Kingdom: Animalia
- Phylum: Cnidaria
- Subphylum: Anthozoa
- Class: Octocorallia
- Order: Scleralcyonacea
- Family: Mopseidae
- Genus: Pteronisis; Alderslade, 1998

Species
- Pteronisis echinaxis; Pteronisis incerta; Pteronisis laboutei; Pteronisis oliganema; Pteronisis plumacea; Pteronisis provocatoris; Pteronisis whiteleggei

Genus of corals

Pteronisis is a genus of coral in the family Mopseidae. The name derives from Greek pteron, meaning "feather", in allusion to the pinnate branching.

== Description ==
Most specimens are smaller than 20 cm, but can reach up to at least 36 cm. The genus is mostly planar, pinnate, and profusely branched, with at least one exception. Axial internodes are generally colorless, greyish white, or sometimes pale shades of pink or red. Axial nodes are generally light to dark brown near the base of the plant, yellowish to yellowish brown in the principal branches, and pale yellow, white, or colorless, with a darker central band, in the pinnae.
