= Primnoisis =

Scientific classification
- Kingdom: Animalia
- Phylum: Cnidaria
- Subphylum: Anthozoa
- Class: Octocorallia
- Order: Scleralcyonacea
- Family: Mopseidae
- Genus: Primnoisis; Studer & Wright, 1887

Species
- Primnoisis delicatula; Primnoisis formosa; Primnoisis gracilis; Primnoisis millerae; Primnoisis niwa; Primnoisis rigida; Primnoisis antarctica; Primnoisis chatham; Primnoisis erymna; Primnoisis fragilis; Primnoisis ambigua; Primnoisis mimas; Primnoisis rigida; Primnoisis tasmani

Genus of corals

Primnoisis is a genus of deep-sea bamboo coral in the family Mopseidae.
