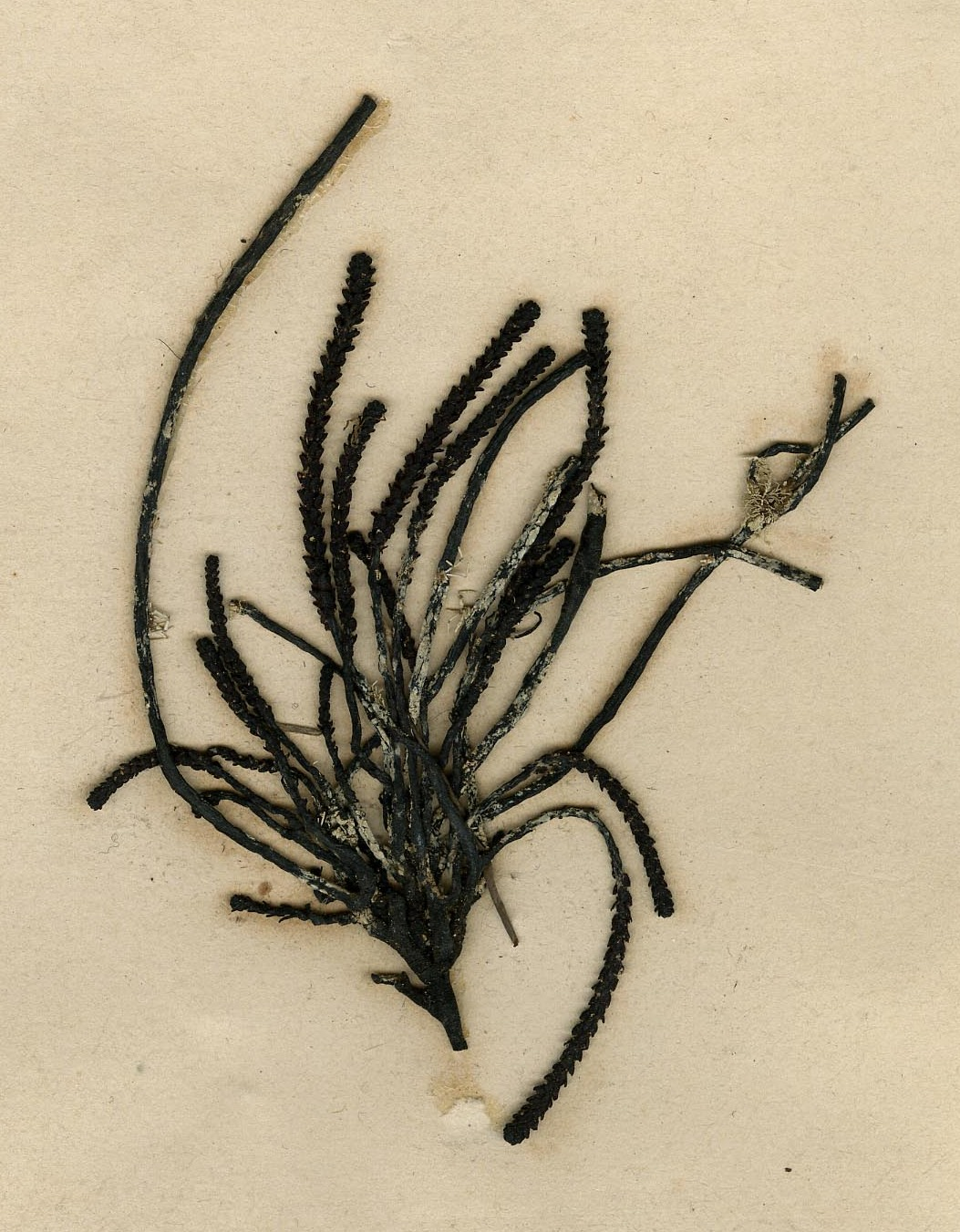
- Mopsea encrinula

Scientific classification
- Kingdom: Animalia
- Phylum: Cnidaria
- Subphylum: Anthozoa
- Class: Octocorallia
- Order: Scleralcyonacea
- Family: Mopseidae; Gray, 1870

Type genus
- Mopsea Lamouroux, 1816

Synonyms
- Circinisidinae Grant, 1976; Mopseadae Gray, 1870; Mopseinae Gray, 1870; Peltastisidinae Grant, 1976

= Mopseidae =

Family of soft corals

Mopseidae is a family of soft corals in the order Scleralcyonacea. It contains 30 genera, with Mopsea as the type genus.

== Genera ==
Mopseidae contains the following genera:

- Acanthoisis Wright & Studer, 1887
- Annisis Alderslade, 1998
- Australisis Bayer & Stefani, 1987
- Caribisis Bayer & Stefani, 1987
- Chathamisis Grant, 1976
- Circinisis Grant, 1976
- Echinisis Thomson & Rennet, 1931
- Florectisis Alderslade, 1998
- Gorgonisis Alderslade, 1998
- Iotisis Alderslade, 1998
- Jasminisis Alderslade, 1998
- Ktenosquamisis Alderslade, 1998
- Lissopholidisis Alderslade, 1998
- Minuisis Grant, 1976
- Mopsea Lamouroux, 1816
- Myriozotisis Alderslade, 1998
- Notisis Gravier, 1913
- Oparinisis Alderslade, 1998
- Pangolinisis Alderslade, 1998
- Paracanthoisis Alderslade, 1998
- Peltastisis Nutting, 1910
- Plexipomisis Alderslade, 1998
- Primnoisis Studer & Wright, 1887
- Pteronisis Alderslade, 1998
- Sclerisis Studer, 1878
- Sphaerokodisis Alderslade, 1998
- Stenisis Bayer & Stefani, 1987
- Tenuisis Bayer & Stefani, 1987
- Tethrisis Alderslade, 1998
- Zignisis Alderslade, 1998
