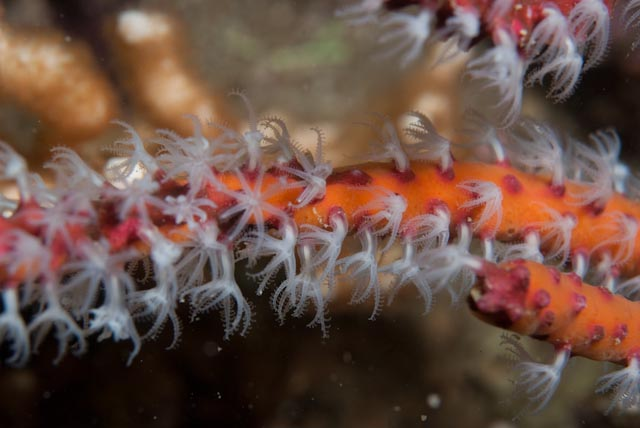
- Gorgonian twig coral

Scientific classification
- Kingdom: Animalia
- Phylum: Cnidaria
- Subphylum: Anthozoa
- Class: Octocorallia
- Order: Scleralcyonacea
- Family: Spongiodermidae
- Genus: Homophyton; Gray, 1866

Species
- 2 species, see below

= Homophyton =

Genus of corals

Homophyton is a genus of corals in the family Spongiodermidae. This genus is found only off the coast of southern Africa.

== Species ==
There are two species in the genus:

- Homophyton verrucosum (Möbius, 1861)
- Homophyton vickersi (Benham, 1928)
