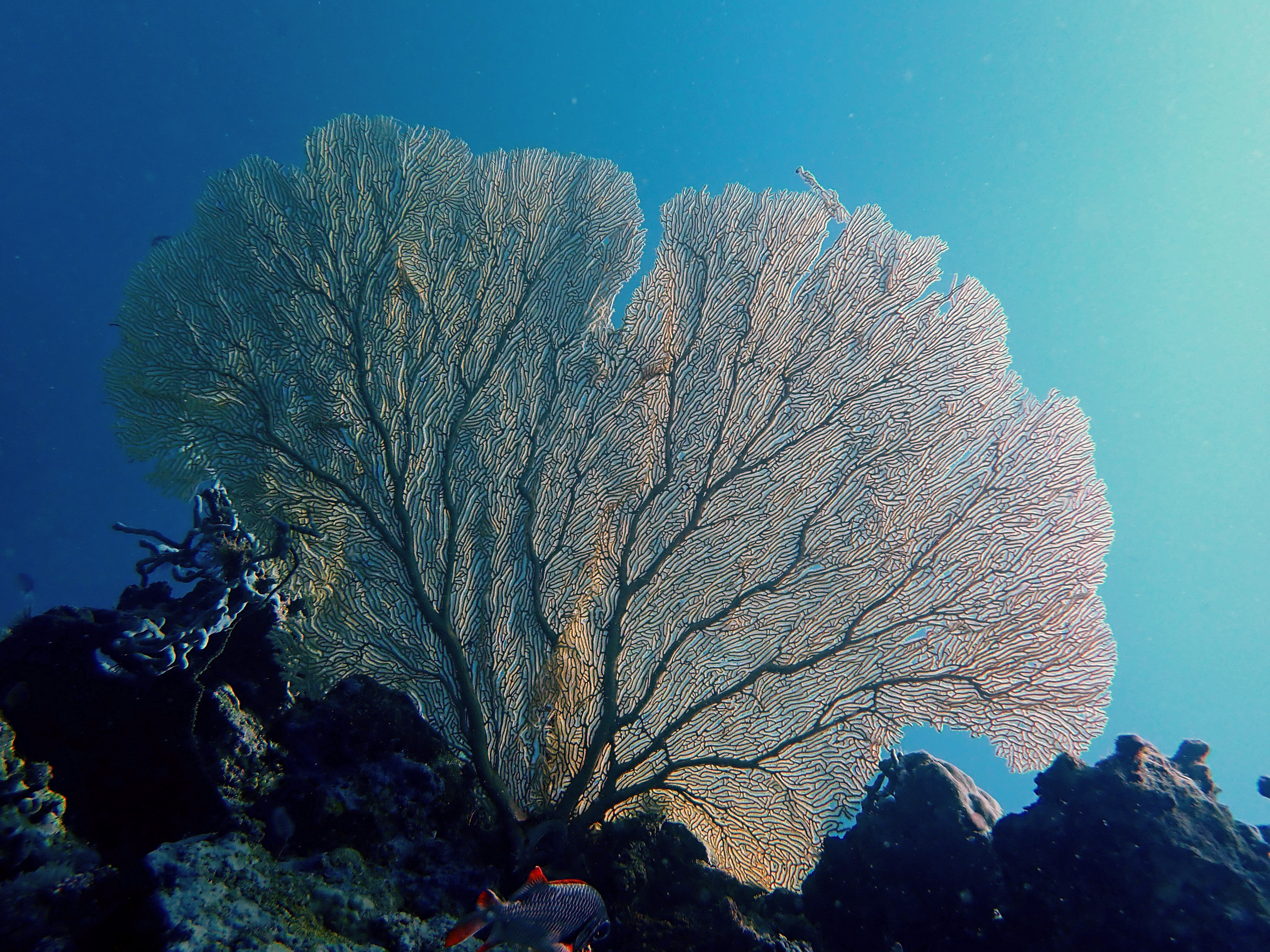
- Annella mollis off Mayotte

Scientific classification
- Kingdom: Animalia
- Phylum: Cnidaria
- Subphylum: Anthozoa
- Class: Octocorallia
- Order: Malacalcyonacea
- Family: Subergorgiidae
- Genus: Annella; Gray, 1858

= Annella =

Genus of corals

Annella is a genus of soft corals belonging to the family Subergorgiidae.

== Species ==
- Annella mollis (Nutting, 1910)
- Annella reticulata (Ellis & Solander, 1786)
