= Helicogorgia =

Scientific classification
- Domain: Eukaryota
- Kingdom: Animalia
- Phylum: Cnidaria
- Subphylum: Anthozoa
- Class: Octocorallia
- Order: Alcyonacea
- Family: Chrysogorgiidae
- Genus: Helicogorgia; Verrill, 1883

Genus of corals

Helicogorgia is a genus of corals belonging to the family Chrysogorgiidae.

The species of this genus are found in Southern Africa.

Species:

- Helicogorgia capensis (Simpson, 1910)
- Helicogorgia flagellata (Simpson, 1910)
- Helicogorgia ramifera Williams, 1992
- Helicogorgia spiralis (Hickson, 1904)
- Helicogorgia squamifera (Kükenthal, 1919)
