= RV Sprightly =

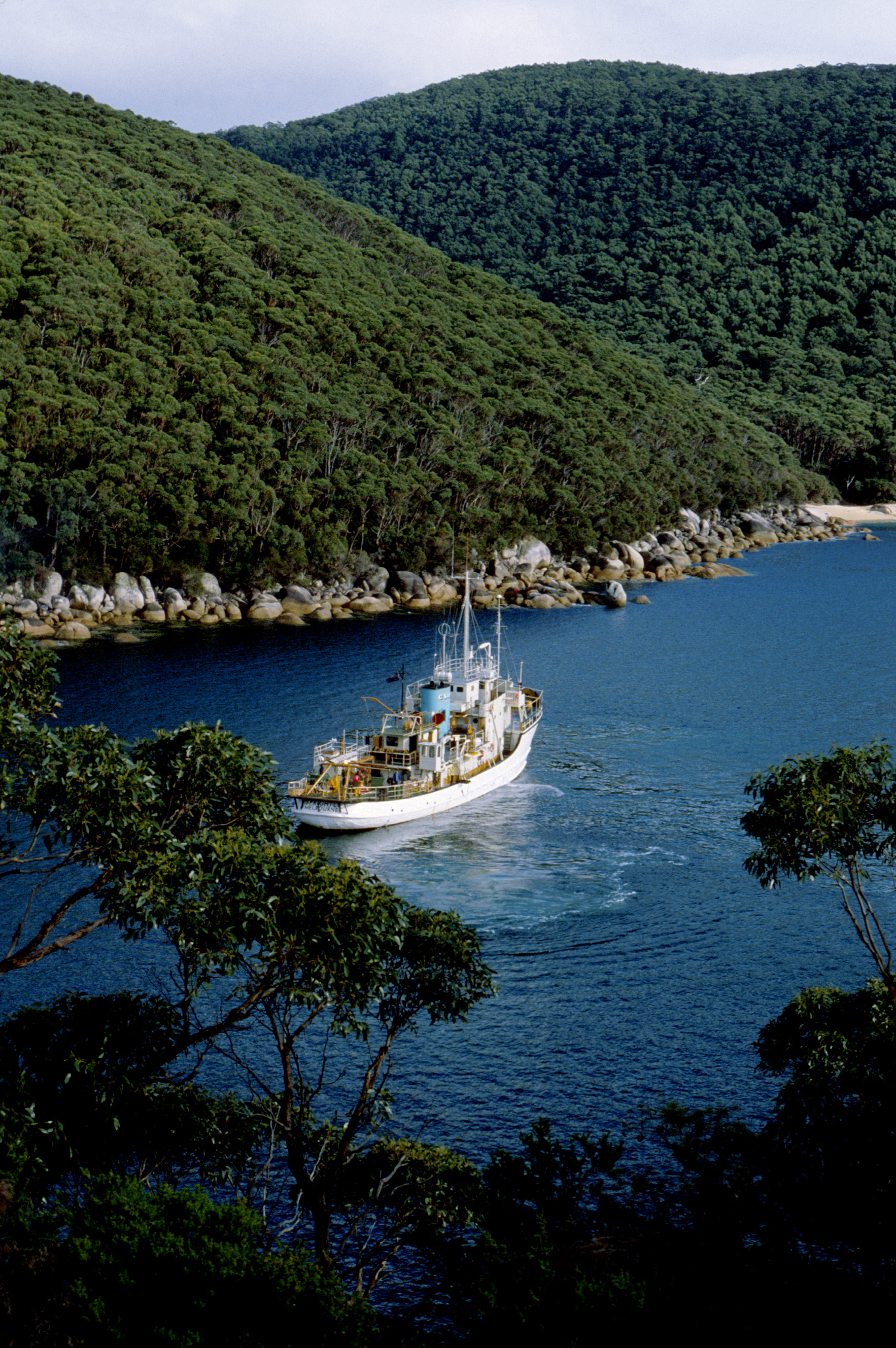
RV Sprightly

RV Sprightly was a 42m research vessel owned by the CSIRO. Sprightly originally served as a salvage tug in the North Atlantic in World War II. Following the war it was purchased by the CSIRO where it spent 40 years on scientific duties before being retired and replaced by the RV Franklin.

In 1978 the master of the ship was showing George Cavill.
