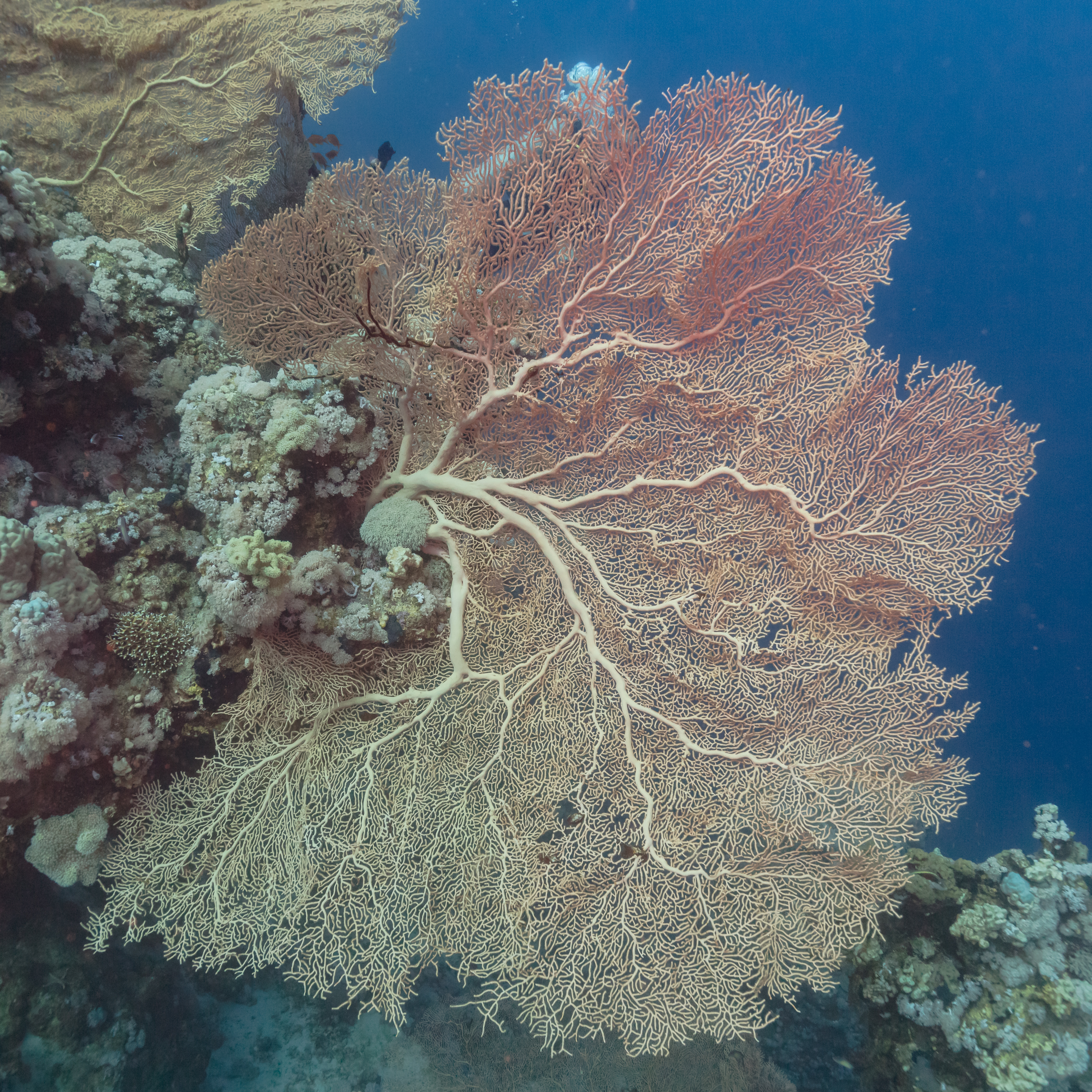
- Annella mollis off Mayotte

Scientific classification
- Kingdom: Animalia
- Phylum: Cnidaria
- Subphylum: Anthozoa
- Class: Octocorallia
- Order: Malacalcyonacea
- Family: Subergorgiidae
- Genus: Annella
- Species: A. mollis

Binomial name
- Annella mollis (Nutting, 1910)

= Annella mollis =

Species of coral

Annella mollis (Subergorgia mollis) is a species of soft corals belonging to the family Subergorgiidae. They live in areas in the Indo-West Pacific, around 12 to 18 meters deep, in lower reef slopes, on rocks and sand substrates.
