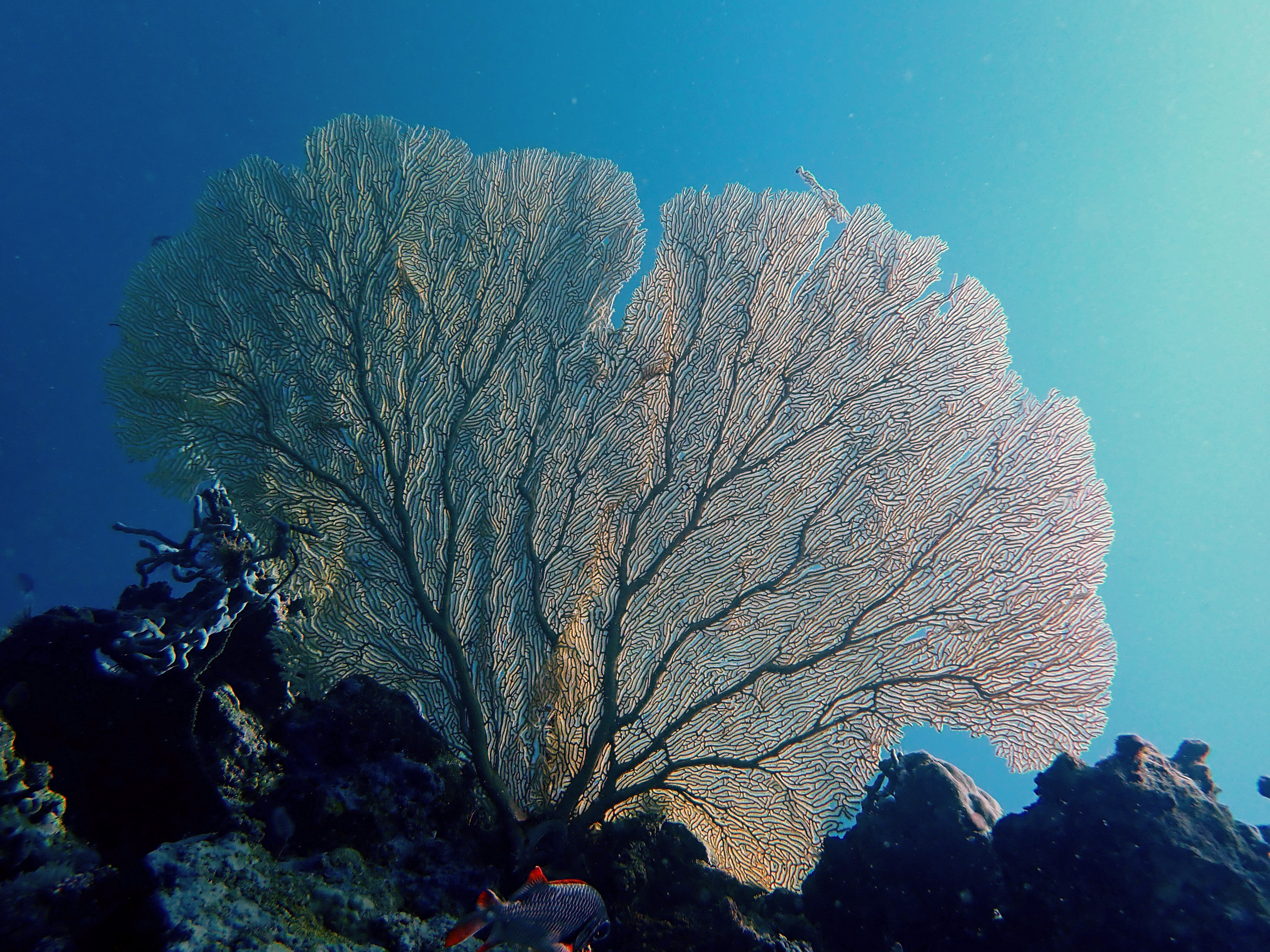
- Annella mollis off Mayotte

Scientific classification
- Kingdom: Animalia
- Phylum: Cnidaria
- Subphylum: Anthozoa
- Class: Octocorallia
- Order: Malacalcyonacea
- Family: Subergorgiidae; Gray, 1859

Genera
- see text

= Subergorgiidae =

Family of corals

Subergorgiidae is a family of corals, a member of order Malacalcyonacea in phylum Cnidaria.

== Genera ==
Genera in this family include:

- Annella Gray, 1858
- Subergorgia Gray, 1857
