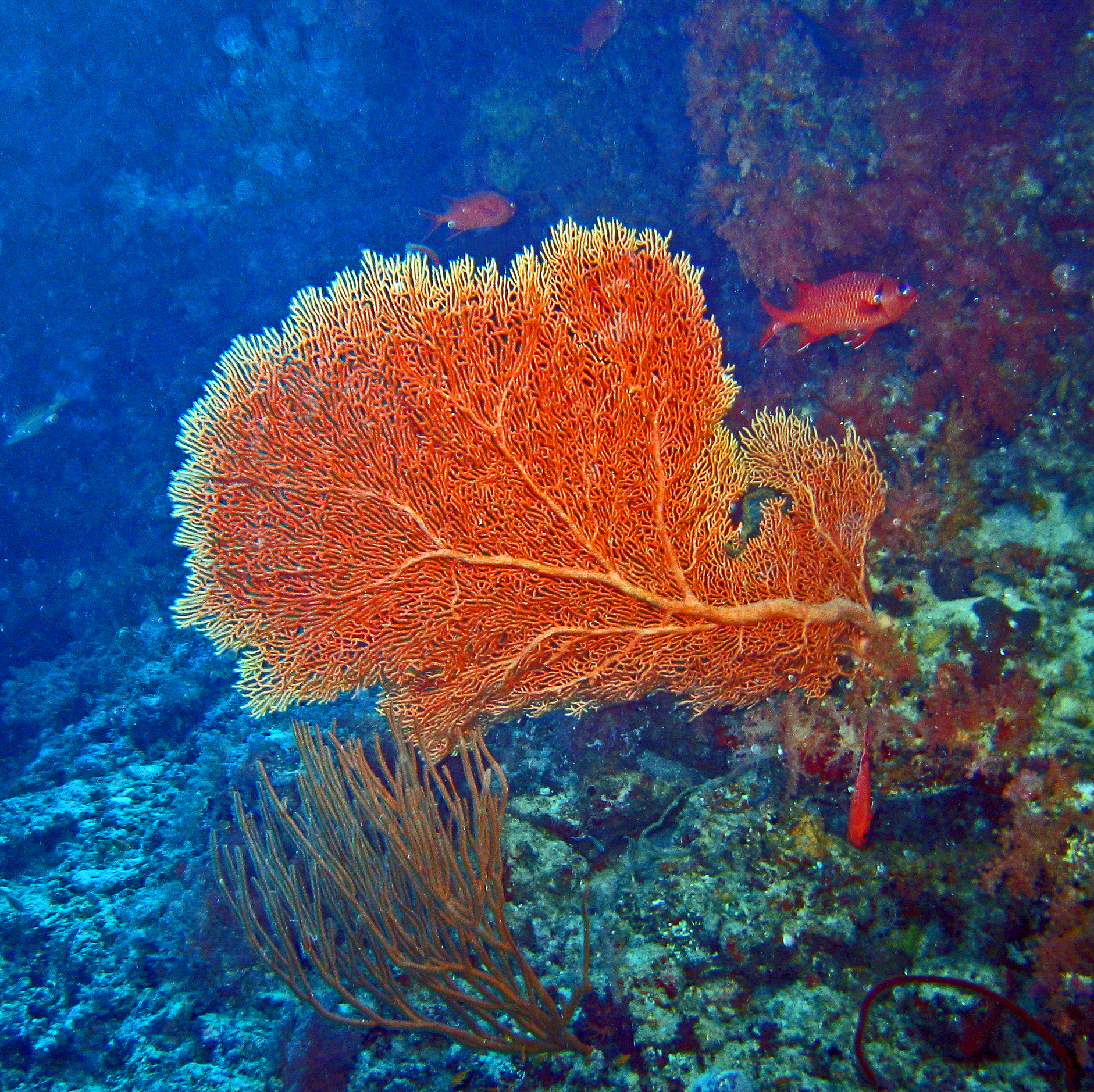
- Subergorgia mollis off Maldives

Scientific classification
- Kingdom: Animalia
- Phylum: Cnidaria
- Subphylum: Anthozoa
- Class: Octocorallia
- Order: Malacalcyonacea
- Family: Subergorgiidae
- Genus: Subergorgia; Gray, 1857

Synonyms
- Subergorgonia

= Subergorgia =

Genus of corals

Subergorgia is a genus of soft corals belonging to the family Subergorgiidae.

== Species ==
The following species are recognized in the genus Subergorgia:

- Subergorgia compressa Gray, 1857
- Subergorgia koellikeri Wright & Studer, 1889
- Subergorgia mexicana (Koch, 1878)
- Subergorgia muriceoides Stiasny, 1937
- Subergorgia nuttingi Stiasny, 1937
- Subergorgia patula (Ellis & Solander, 1786)
- Subergorgia rubra (Thomson, 1905)
- Subergorgia suberosa (Pallas, 1766)
- Subergorgia thomsoni (Nutting, 1911)
- Subergorgia verriculata (Esper, 1791)
