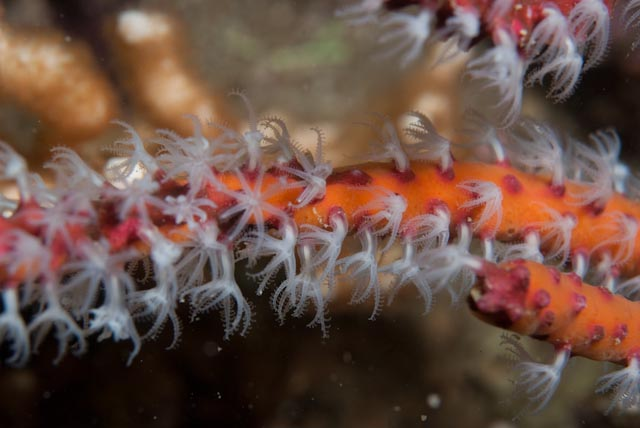
- Twig coral1

Scientific classification
- Kingdom: Animalia
- Phylum: Cnidaria
- Subphylum: Anthozoa
- Class: Octocorallia
- Order: Scleralcyonacea
- Family: Spongiodermidae; Wright & Studer, 1889

= Spongiodermidae =

Family of soft corals

Spongiodermidae is a family of corals belonging to the order Scleralcyonacea.

Genera:

- Callipodium Verrill, 1869
- Diodogorgia Kükenthal, 1919
- Homophyton Gray, 1866
- Sclerophyton Cairns & Wirshing, 2015
- Titanideum Verrill, 1864
- Tripalea Bayer, 1955
