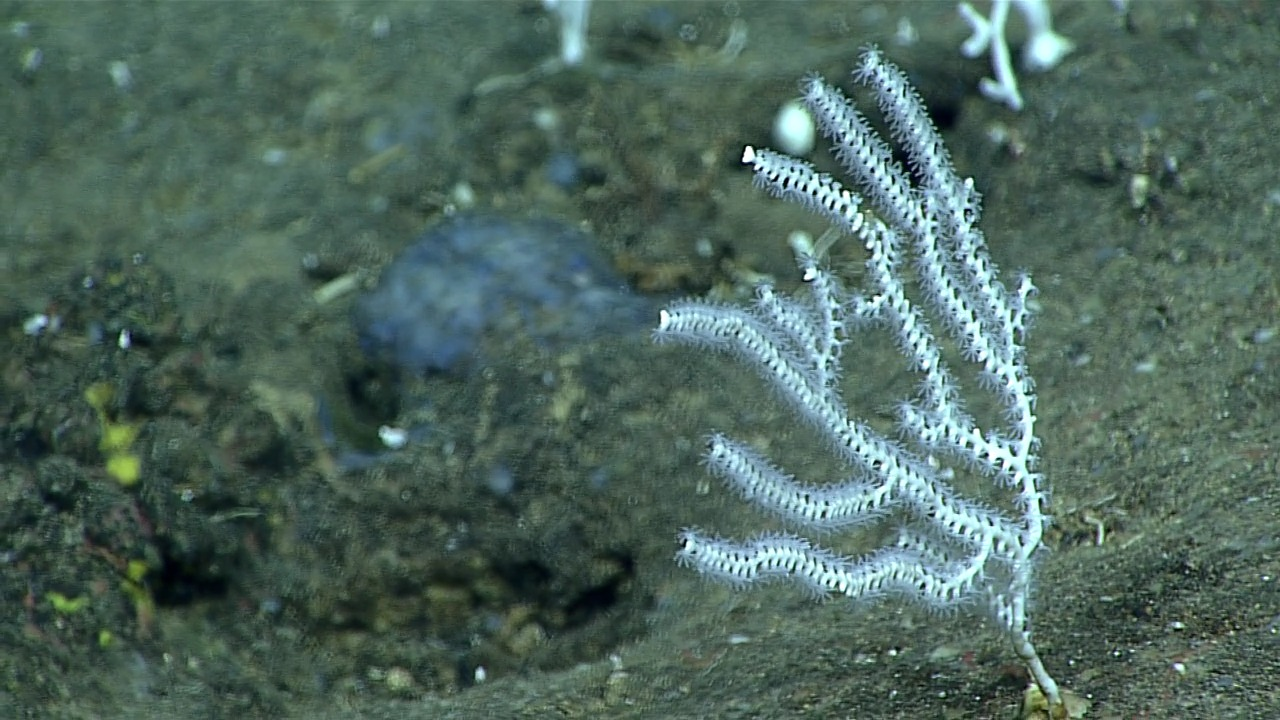
- Parisis Verrill

Scientific classification
- Kingdom: Animalia
- Phylum: Cnidaria
- Subphylum: Anthozoa
- Class: Octocorallia
- Order: Scleralcyonacea
- Family: Parisididae; Aurivillius, 1931
- Genus: Parisis; Verrill, 1864

Species
- See text

= Parisis (coral) =

Genus of corals

Parisis is a genus of corals in the monotypic family Parisididae.

== Species ==
Species in this genus include:

- Parisis australis Wright & Studer, 1889
- Parisis fruticosa Verrill, 1864
- Parisis laxa Verrill, 1865
- Parisis minor Wright & Studer, 1889
- Parisis poindimia Grasshoff, 1999
