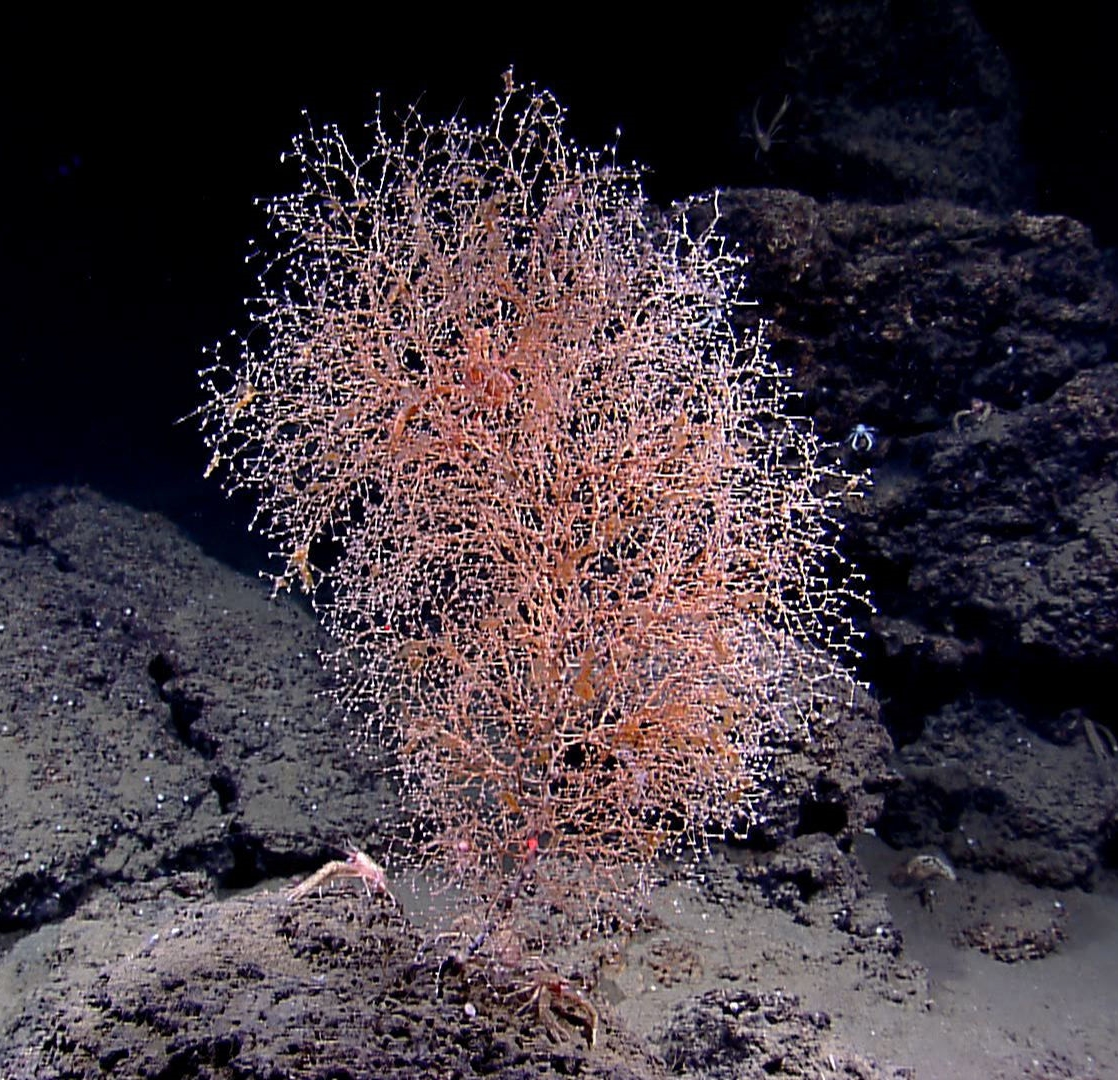
- Chrysogorgia sp.
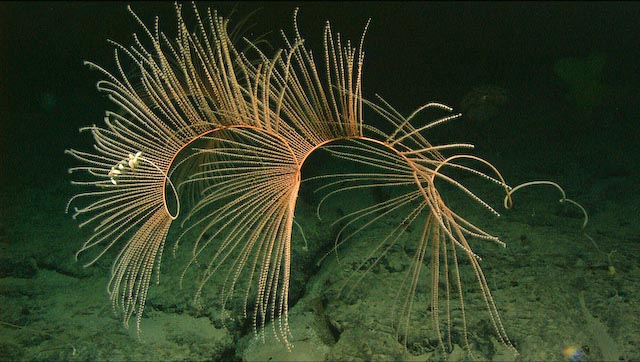
- Iridogorgia magnispiralis

Scientific classification
- Kingdom: Animalia
- Phylum: Cnidaria
- Subphylum: Anthozoa
- Class: Octocorallia
- Order: Scleralcyonacea
- Family: Chrysogorgiidae; Verrill, 1883

Synonyms
- Dasygorgidae Studer, 1887; Malacogorgiidae Hickson, 1904

= Chrysogorgiidae =

Family of corals

Chrysogorgiidae is a family of soft corals in the suborder Scleralcyonacea.

Currently the only fossil record for the family are specimens tentatively identified as a member of the genus Radicipes from the Oligocene epoch. It was found in deep-water strata in western Washington State, USA.

== Distribution ==
It is a widely distributed family being found worldwide in deep-sea environments. Most species are found in the Atlantic and Pacific Oceans with only a reports from the Indian Ocean. Chrysogorgiids are the most abundant family of corals on deep sea seamounts southwest of Hawaii.

== Taxonomy ==
The following genera are recognised as members of the family Chrysogorgiidae:

- Chrysogorgia Duchassaing & Michelotti, 1864
- Iridogorgia Verrill, 1883
- Metallogorgia Versluys, 1902
- Parachrysogorgia Xu, Zhan & Xu, 2023
- Pseudochrysogorgia Pante & France, 2010
- Radicipes Stearns, 1883
- Ramuligorgia Cairns, Cordeiro & Xu in Cairns et al., 2021
- Rhodaniridogorgia Watling, 2007

=== Taxonomic history ===
There have been a number of other genera that have been previously assigned to this family. A recent taxonomic revision based on phylogenomic analysis either found them not to belong to the family or couldn't place them because there was no suitable molecular data for analysis.

- Chalcogorgia Bayer, 1949
- Distichogorgia Bayer, 1979
- Flagelligorgia Cairns & Cordeiro, 2017
- Helicogorgia Verrill, 1883
- Pleurogorgia Versluys, 1902 (tentatively moved to Pleurogorgiidae)
- Trichogorgia Hickson, 1904 (tentatively moved to Ifalukellidae)
- Stephanogorgia Bayer & Muzik, 1976
- Xenogorgia Bayer & Muzik, 1976
