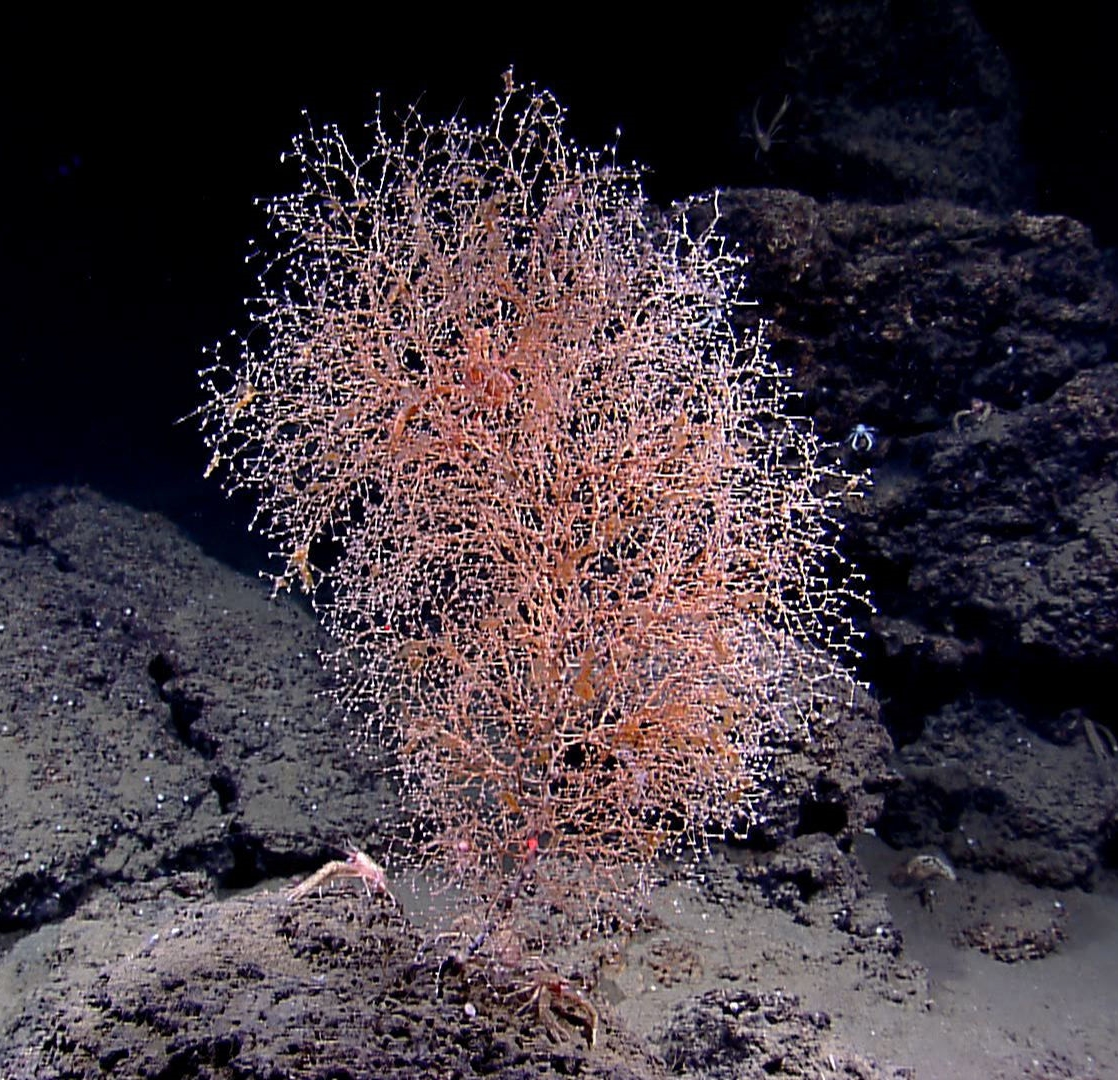
- Chrysogorgia sp.

Scientific classification
- Kingdom: Animalia
- Phylum: Cnidaria
- Subphylum: Anthozoa
- Class: Octocorallia
- Order: Scleralcyonacea; McFadden, van Ofwegen & Quattrini, 2022

= Scleralcyonacea =

Order of corals

Scleralcyonacea is an order of the class Octocorallia.

It combines the traditional taxa Calcaxonia (except the genus Isis), Pennatulacea and Helioporacea, as well as a part of Scleraxonia and a part of Stolonifera, and the genera Ideogorgia and Parasphaerasclera. See below for a more detailed description.

== Etymology ==
Scleralcyonacea was named after Greek σκληρός (sklēros, transl. hard) and former coral order Alcyonacea, as most of its members contain either an axial skeleton made of calcium carbonate or sclerites fused with calcitic material.

== Taxonomy ==
A clade combining (primarily) the Calcaxonia, the Pennatulacea and the Helioporacea was identified (but not named) as early as in a 2006 study and in several later studies; it was usually called informally the Calcaxonia-Pennatulacea clade or the Pennatulacea-Calcaxonia clade.

In 2019, G. C. Williams proposed (only optionally) calling the Calcaxonia-Pennatulacea clade Calcaxonia (sensu lato), but other authors did not adopt this naming proposal.

The phylogenetic study McFadden et al. 2022 assigned the name Scleralcyonacea and the rank of an order to the Calcaxonia-Pennatulacea clade. The study found Octocorallia to be divided into two monophyletic lineages (both identified already by some earlier studies), which the study established as the orders Scleralcyonacea and Malacalcyonacea. Scleralcyonacea was found to contain:

- all taxa formerly assigned to the order Pennatulacea (i.e. the current superfamily Pennatuloidea), to the order Helioporacea (i.e. the current family Helioporidae [sensu lato]) and to the suborder Calcaxonia (inclusive of Dendrobrachia), except the genus Isis (see below);
- and a part of the suborder Scleraxonia and of the (sub)order Stolonifera;
- and the genera Ideogorgia (from the suborder Holaxonia) and Parasphaerasclera (from the suborder Alcyoniina).

While the genus Isis was historically placed within Calcaxonia as a relative of Keratoisididae and Mopseidae, it was found to be unrelated, with the difference in internode growth patterns being identified as phylogenetically informative.

=== Child taxa ===
Scleralcyonacea contains the monophyletic sea pens (superfamily Pennatuloidea) as well as 21 other families and two incertae sedis genera. The order includes the following:

- superfamily Pennatuloidea Ehrenberg, 1834 [Pe]
- family Aulopsammiidae Reuss, 1854 [= Litholestidae Bayer & Muzik, 1977] (included in Helioporidae by McFadden et al. 2022) [He]
- family Briareidae Gray, 1859 [Sc]
- family Chelidonisididae Heestand Saucier, France & Watling, 2021 [Ca]
- family Chrysogorgiidae Verrill, 1883 [Ca]
- family Coralliidae Lamouroux, 1812 [Sc]
- family Cornulariidae Dana, 1846 [St]
- family Dendrobrachiidae Brook, 1889 [Ca/Ho]
- family Ellisellidae Gray, 1859 [Ca]
- family Erythropodiidae Kükenthal, 1916 [Sc]
- family Helioporidae Moseley, 1876 [He]
- family Ideogorgiidae McFadden, van Ofwegen & Quattrini, 2024 [Ho]
- family Ifalukellidae Bayer, 1955 [Ca]
- family Isidoidae Heestand Saucier, France & Watling, 2021 [Ca]
- family Keratoisididae Gray, 1870 [Ca]
- family Mopseidae Gray, 1870 [Ca]
- family Parasphaerascleridae McFadden & van Ofwegen, 2013 [Al]
- family Parisididae Aurivillius, 1931 [Sc]
- family Pleurogorgiidae Cairns, Cordeiro & Alderslade in Cairns et al., 2021 [Ca]
- family Primnoidae Milne Edwards, 1857 [Ca]
- family Sarcodictyonidae McFadden, van Ofwegen & Quattrini, 2024 [St]
- family Spongiodermidae Wright & Studer, 1889 [Sc]
- genus Helicogorgia Bayer, 1981 [Ca]
- genus Stephanogorgia Bayer & Muzik, 1976 [Ca]

Legend (traditional assignment of the taxa): Ca = Calcaxonia, Pe = Pennatulacea, He = Helioporacea, St = Stolonifera, Sc = Scleraxonia, Ho = Holaxonia (sensu stricto), Al = Alcyoniina.

== Bibliography ==
- Song, Jun-Im; Hwang, Sung-Jin; Moon, Hae-Won; An, In-Young (April 30, 2012). "Taxonomic Study of Suborder Calcaxonia (Alcyonacea: Octocorallia: Anthozoa) from King Sejong Station, Antarctic". Animal Systematics, Evolution and Diversity. 28 (2): 84–96. doi:10.5635/ASED.2012.28.2.084. ISSN 2234-6953.
