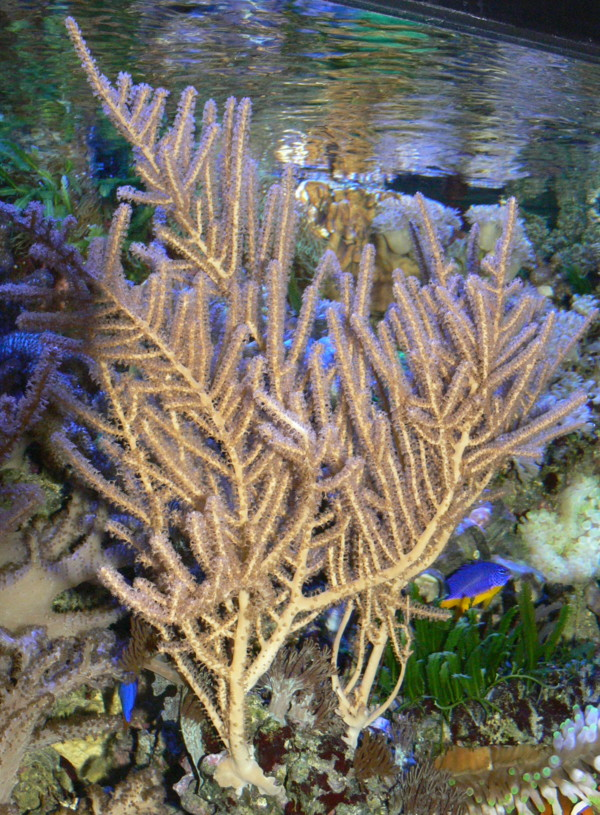
- Pinnigorgia sp.

Scientific classification
- Kingdom: Animalia
- Phylum: Cnidaria
- Subphylum: Anthozoa
- Class: Octocorallia
- Order: Alcyonacea
- Suborder: Holaxonia; Studer, 1887

Families
- See text

= Holaxonia =

Suborder of corals

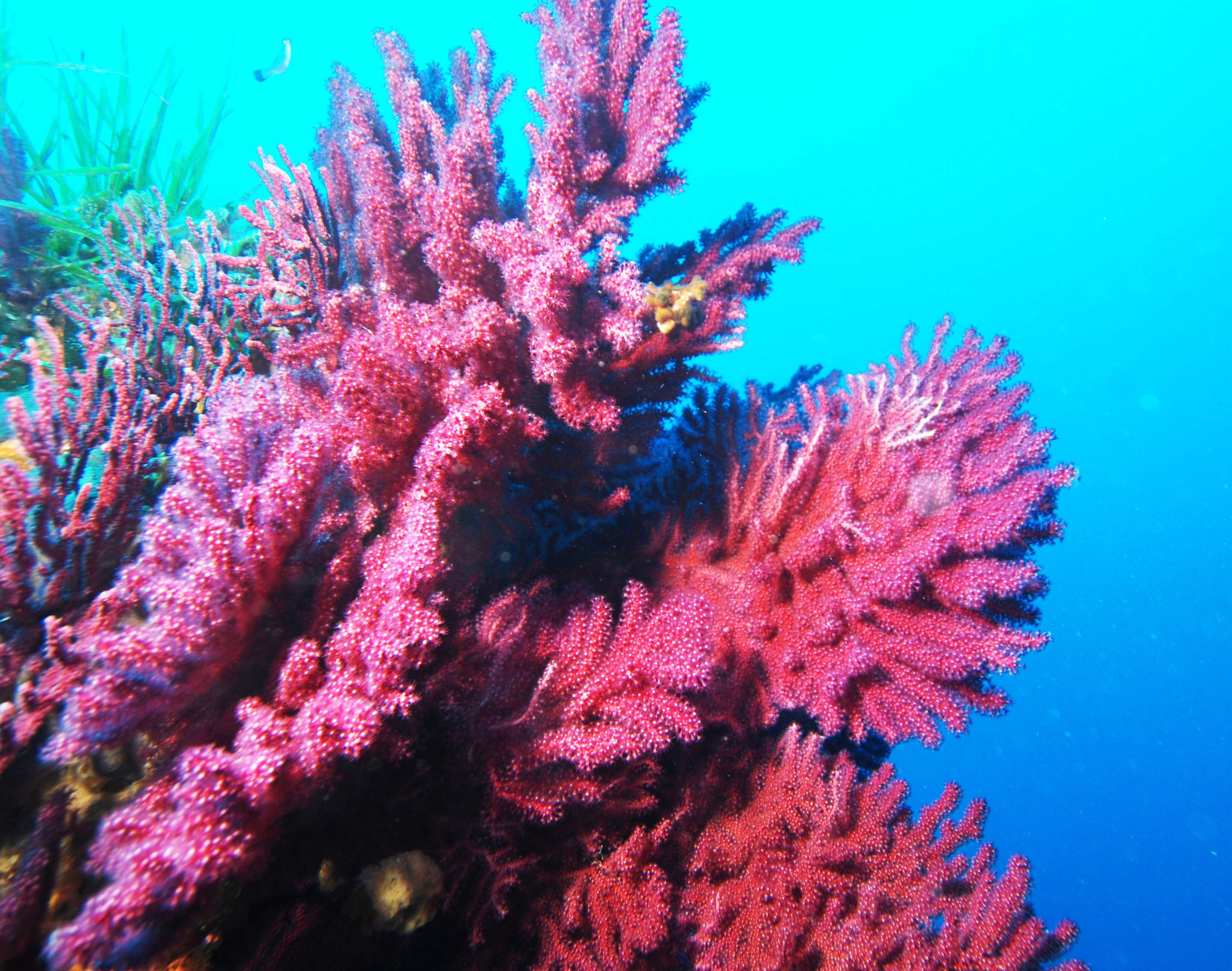
Paramuricea sp.

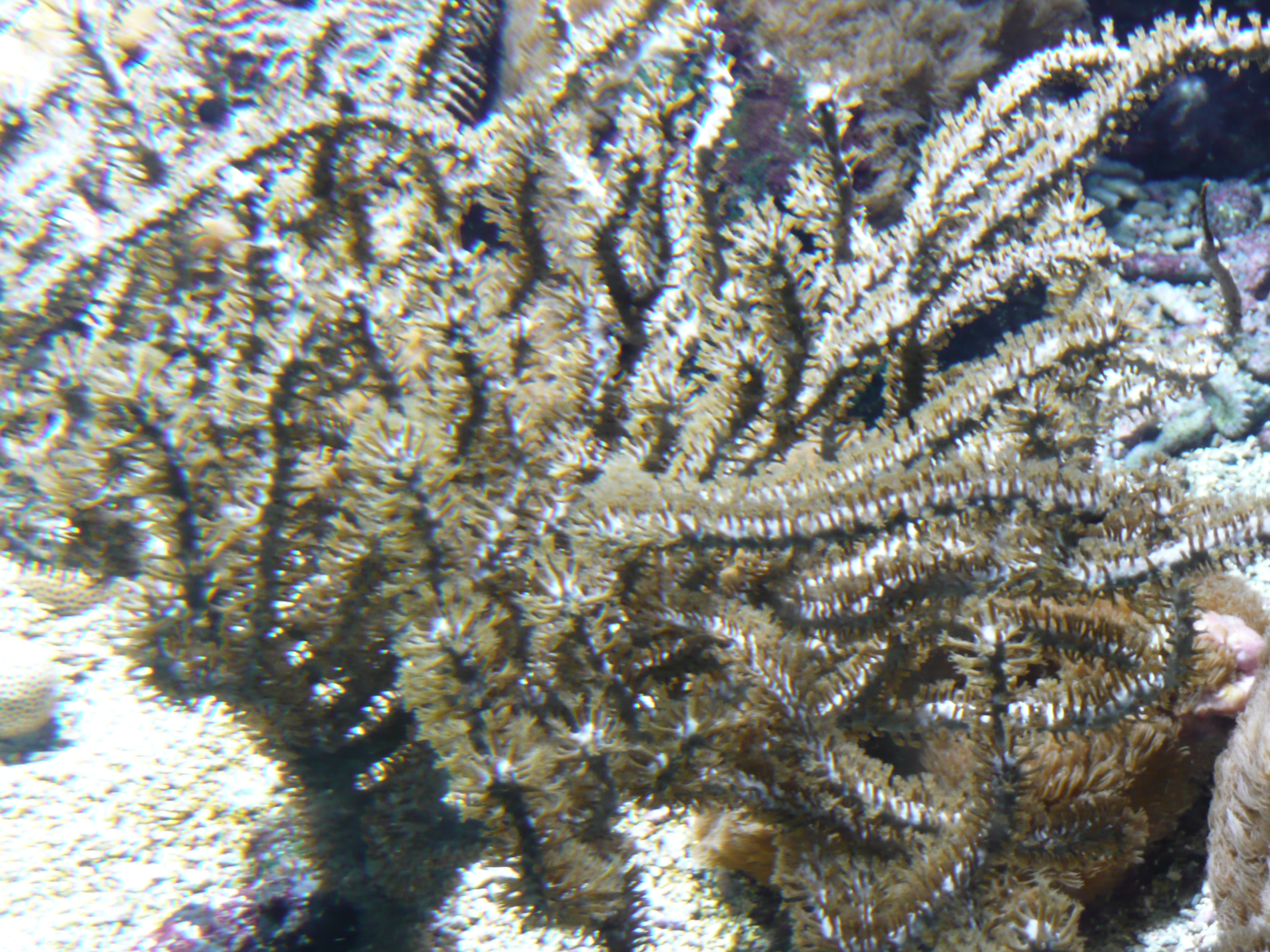
Eunicea sp.

Holaxonia (English name: holaxonians) is a former Octocorallian suborder of the order Gorgonacea (English names: gorgonians or sea fans), or alternatively of the broadly conceived order Alcyonacea. Before 1981/1999, Holaxonia usually also included the taxon Calcaxonia (informal name: restricted Holaxonia).

Since a 2022 revision of the Octocorallia, the content of the former Holaxania has been included in the new order Malacalcyonacea, within which it does not form a monophyletic group (clade) and has no name. The two Holaxonian genera Dendrobrachia a Ideogorgia are an exception in that they have been included not in the order Malacalcyonacea, but in the order Scleralcyonacea.

Vernacular names of certain members of Holaxonia include: sea fan, sea whip, sea rod, and sea blade.

== Characteristics ==
Members of Holaxonia are soft corals. They are colonial, sessile organisms and are generally tree-like in structure. They do not have a hard skeleton composed of calcium carbonate but have a firm but pliable, central axial skeleton composed of a fibrous protein called gorgonin embedded in a tissue matrix, the coenenchyme. In some genera this is permeated with a calcareous substance in the form of fused spicules. Members of Holaxonia are characterized by having an unspiculated axis and often a soft, chambered central core. The polyps have eight-fold symmetry and in many species, especially in the families Gorgoniidae and Plexauridae, contain symbiotic photosynthetic algae called zooxanthellae. These soft corals are popular in salt water aquaria.

== Families and genera ==
In 2018, the World Register of Marine Species listed the following families and genera in Holaxonia:

- Family Acanthogorgiidae Gray, 1859
  - Genus Acanthogorgia Gray, 1857
  - Genus Anthogorgia Verrill, 1868
  - Genus Calcigorgia Broch, 1935
  - Genus Calicogorgia Thomson & Henderson, 1906
  - Genus Callicigorgia
  - Genus Cyclomuricea Nutting, 1908
  - Genus Muricella Verrill, 1868
  - Genus Versluysia Nutting, 1910
- Family Dendrobrachiidae Brook, 1889 - this family was moved to the suborder Calcaxonia in 2019
  - Genus Dendrobrachia Brook, 1889
- Family Gorgoniidae Lamouroux, 1812
  - Genus Adelogorgia Bayer, 1958
  - Genus Antillogorgia Bayer, 1951
  - Genus Eugorgia Verrill, 1868
  - Genus Eunicella Verrill, 1869
  - Genus Filigorgia Stiasny, 1937
  - Genus Gorgonia Linnaeus, 1758
  - Genus Guaiagorgia Grasshoff & Alderslade, 1997
  - Genus Hicksonella Nutting, 1910
  - Genus Leptogorgia Milne-Edwards, 1857
  - Genus Olindagorgia Bayer, 1981
  - Genus Pacifigorgia Bayer, 1951
  - Genus Phycogorgia Milne Edwards & Haime, 1850
  - Genus Phyllogorgia Milne Edwards & Haime, 1850
  - Genus Pinnigorgia Grasshoff & Alderslade, 1997
  - Genus Pseudopterogorgia Kükenthal, 1919
  - Genus Pterogorgia Ehrenberg, 1834
  - Genus Rumphella Bayer, 1955
  - Genus Tobagogorgia Sanchez, 2007
- Family Keroeididae Kinoshita, 1910
  - Genus Ideogorgia Bayer, 1981
  - Genus Keroeides Studer, 1887
  - Genus Lignella Gray, 1870
  - Genus Pseudothelogorgia (van Ofwegen, 1990)
  - Genus Thelogorgia Bayer, 1991
- Family Plexauridae Gray, 1859
  - Genus Acanthacis Deichmann, 1936
  - Genus Acanthomuricea Hentschel, 1903
  - Genus Acis Duchassaing & Michelotti, 1860
  - Genus Alaskagorgia Sánchez & Cairns, 2004
  - Genus Anthomuricea Studer, 1887
  - Genus Anthoplexaura Kükenthal, 1908
  - Genus Astrogorgia Verrill, 1868
  - Genus Astromuricea Germanos, 1895
  - Genus Bayergorgia Williams & Lopez-Gonzalez, 2005
  - Genus Bebryce Philippi, 1841
  - Genus Chromoplexaura Williams, 2013
  - Genus Cryogorgia Williams, 2005
  - Genus Dentomuricea Grasshoff, 1977
  - Genus Discogorgia Kükenthal, 1919
  - Genus Echinogorgia Kölliker, 1865
  - Genus Echinomuricea Verrill, 1869
  - Genus Elasmogorgia Wright & Studer, 1889
  - Genus Eunicea Lamouroux, 1816
  - Genus Euplexaura Verrill, 1869
  - Genus Heterogorgia Verrill, 1868
  - Genus Hypnogorgia Duchassaing & Michelotti, 1864
  - Genus Lapidogorgia Grasshoff, 1999
  - Genus Lepidomuricea Kükenthal, 1919
  - Genus Lytreia Bayer, 1981
  - Genus Menacella Gray, 1870
  - Genus Menella Gray, 1870
  - Genus Mesogligorgia Lopez-Gonzalez, 2007
  - Genus Muricea Lamouroux, 1821
  - Genus Muriceides Wright & Studer, 1889
  - Genus Muriceopsis Aurivillius, 1931
  - Genus Paracis Kükenthal, 1919
  - Genus Paramuricea Koelliker, 1865
  - Genus Paraplexaura Kükenthal, 1909
  - Genus Placogorgia Wright & Studer, 1889
  - Genus Plexaura Lamouroux, 1821
  - Genus Plexaurella Kölliker, 1865
  - Genus Plexauroides Wright & Studer
  - Genus Plexauropsis Verrill
  - Genus Psammogorgia Verrill, 1868
  - Genus Pseudoplexaura Wright & Studer, 1889
  - Genus Pseudothesea Kükenthal, 1919
  - Genus Scleracis Kükenthal, 1919
  - Genus Spinimuricea Grasshoff, 1992
  - Genus Swiftia Duchassaing & Michelotti, 1864
  - Genus Thesea Duchassaing & Michelotti, 1860
  - Genus Trimuricea Gordon, 1926
  - Genus Villogorgia Duchassaing & Michelloti, 1862

== See also ==
- Leptogorgia virgulata
