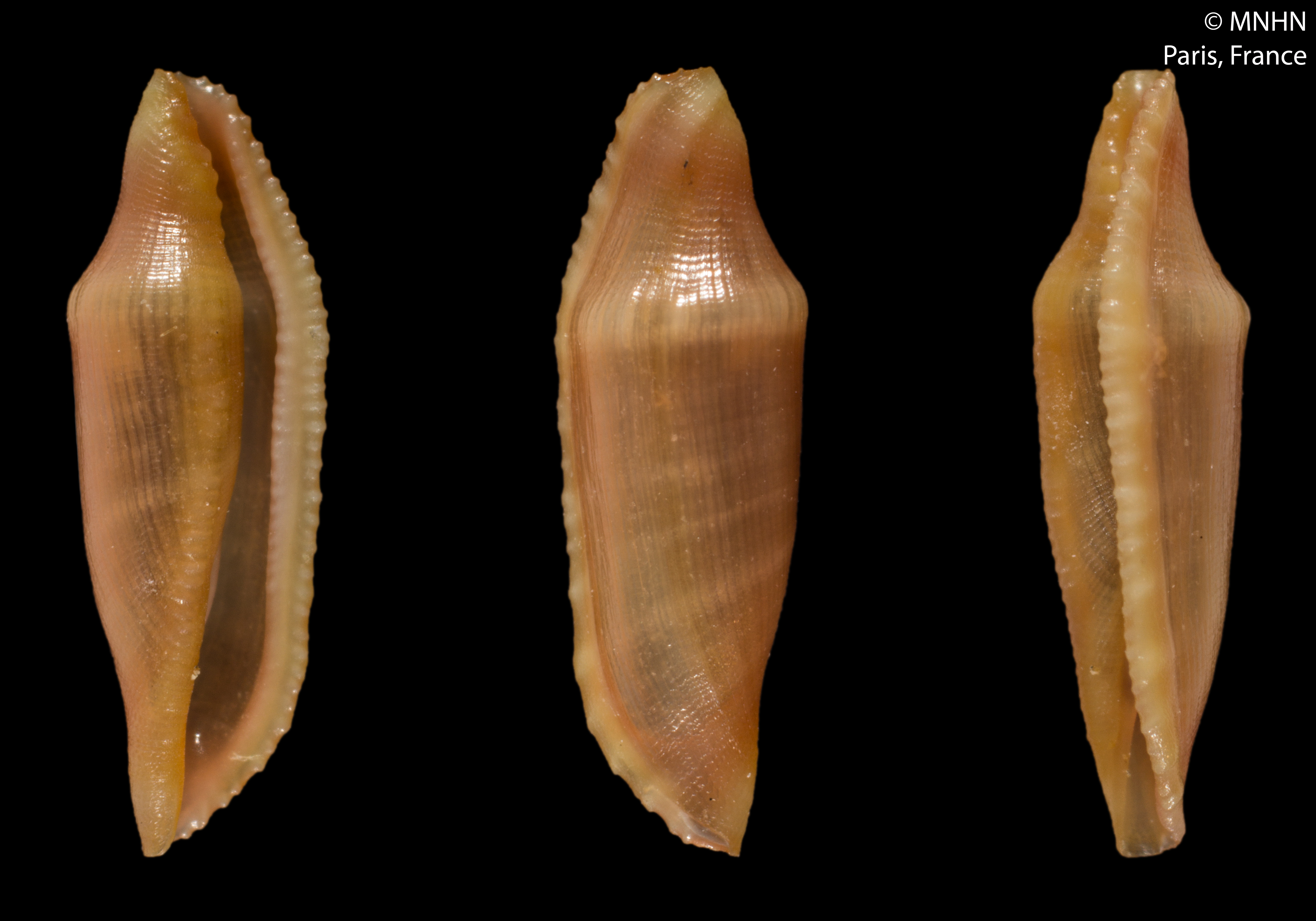
- Shell of Prosimnia hepcae (holotype at MNHN, Paris)

Scientific classification
- Kingdom: Animalia
- Phylum: Mollusca
- Class: Gastropoda
- Subclass: Caenogastropoda
- Order: Littorinimorpha
- Superfamily: Cypraeoidea
- Family: Ovulidae
- Genus: Prosimnia; Schilder, 1925

Synonyms
- Prosimnia (Prosimnia) Schilder, 1927

= Prosimnia =

Genus of gastropods

Prosimnia is a genus of sea snails, marine gastropod mollusks in the subfamily Eocypraeinae of the family Ovulidae.

== Species ==
Species within the genus Prosimnia include:

- † Prosimnia blackae Beu & B. A. Marshall, 2011
- Prosimnia boshuensis Cate, 1973
- Prosimnia draconis Cate, 1973
- Prosimnia hepcae Lorenz & Fehse, 2011
- Prosimnia korkosi Fehse, 2005
- Prosimnia semperi (Weinkauff, 1881)

Synonyms

- Prosimnia piriei (Petuch, 1973): synonym of Amonovula piriei (Petuch, 1973)
- Prosimnia renovata Iredale, 1930: synonym of Crenavolva renovata (Iredale, 1930)
- Prosimnia verconis Cotton & Godfrey, 1932: synonym of Crenavolva verconis (Cotton & Godfrey, 1932) (original combination)
