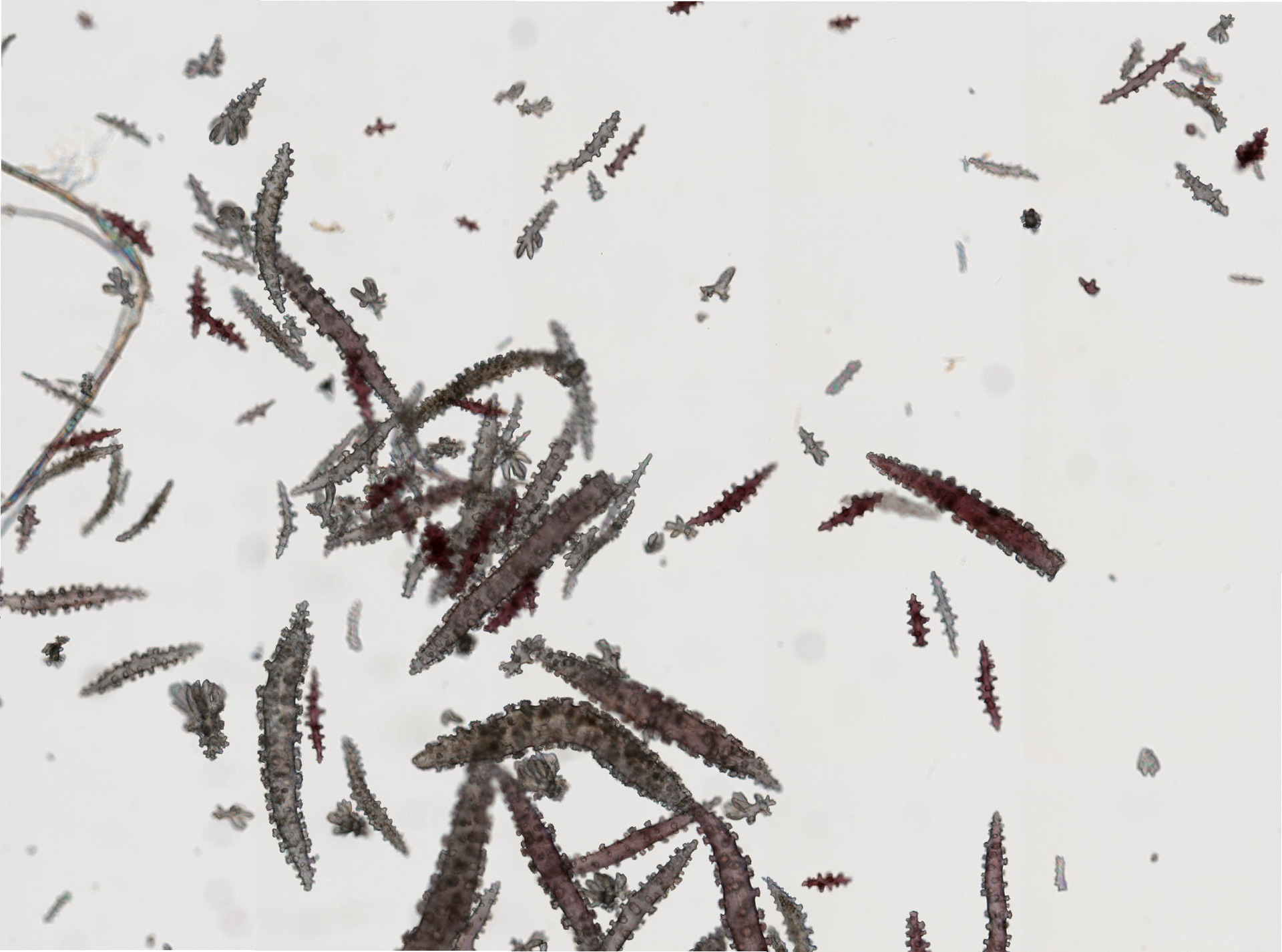

Scientific classification
- Kingdom: Animalia
- Phylum: Cnidaria
- Subphylum: Anthozoa
- Class: Octocorallia
- Order: Malacalcyonacea
- Family: Plexauridae
- Genus: Pseudoplexaura
- Species: P. porosa

Binomial name
- Pseudoplexaura porosa (Houttuyn, 1772)

= Pseudoplexaura porosa =

Species of coral

Pseudoplexaura porosa, commonly known as the porous sea rod or the porous false plexaura, is a species of gorgonian-type colonial octocoral in the family Plexauridae. It is native to the Caribbean Sea and the Gulf of Mexico.

== Description ==
Pseudoplexaura porosa is a large species of coral, growing to a height of about 2.25 m (7 ft 5 in). The colony is tree-like, upright and relatively robust. It grows from a trunk that may be 5 cm (2 in) thick and branches dichotomously (forking repeatedly into pairs of equal-sized branches). The end branches are long and slightly tapered, averaging about 4 mm (0.16 in) thick. The branches are smooth and the tips are soft and slimy. The apertures from which the polyps project are large and crowded together, and are arranged spirally up the branches. The polyps overlap each other, each one having eight tentacles. This octocoral is some shade of pale yellow, tan, or reddish-purple.

== Distribution ==
Pseudoplexaura porosa is found in the Caribbean Sea and Gulf of Mexico. Its range extends from Bermuda and Florida to Colombia, and it usually grows on reefs between 3 and 6 m (10 and 20 ft) deep, but has been recorded at depths as great as 280 metres (920 ft). This octocoral thrives in areas with strong currents and, in contrast to stony corals, the branches are flexible and sway about with the movement of the water.

== Biology ==
The polyps spread out their tentacles to feed on plankton and other fine organic particles both day and night. The octocoral has symbionts in the form of single-celled protists called zooxanthellae that inhabit the tissues. These are photosynthetic and provide their host with nutrients.

The polyps are armed with nematocysts (stinging cells) and can be retracted into the branches defensively. Pseudoplexaura porosa has few predators; animals that sometimes feed on it include the flamingo tongue snail, nudibranchs, butterflyfish and some angelfish.

Individual colonies of P. porosa are either male or female. On particular nights about five days after a full moon in summer and regulated by the lunar cycle, mature colonies liberate gametes into the sea. Planula larvae that develop from fertilised eggs sink to the seabed five days later and undergo metamorphosis to found new colonies. These are soon colonised by zooxanthellae and grow by budding of new polyps. Besides growing asexually and reproducing sexually, pieces of this coral may detach from the parent colony and become fixed to substrate to create a new colony. P. porosa can live for several decades, and the greatest cause of mortality is detachment from the seabed during tropical storms.

== Secondary metabolites ==
Several different substances have been isolated from the tissues. One of these is crassin acetate, a diterpene lactone first obtained from this source and found to be present in very high concentrations in the zooxanthellae. Diterpenoids isolated from Pseudoplexaura porosa show cytotoxic antitumour activity when screened against samples of human tumour cells.
