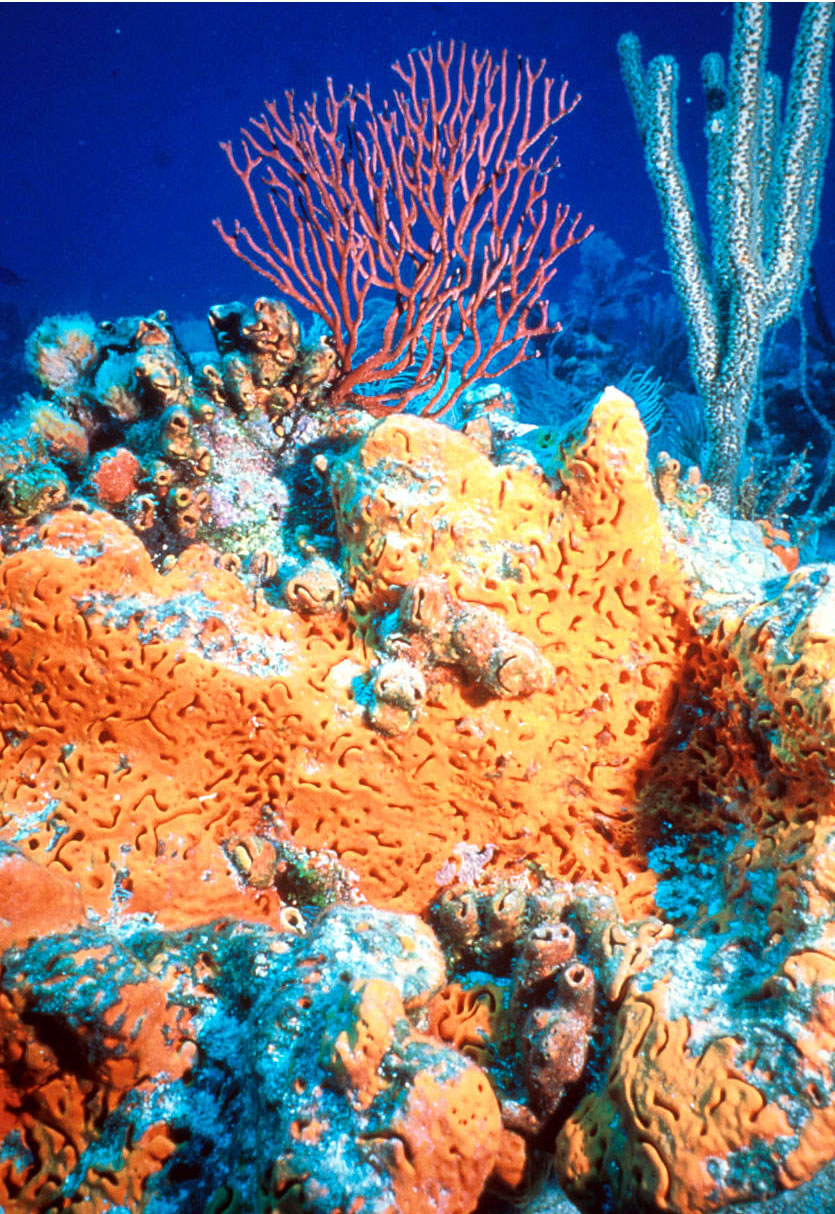
- Coral reef assembly with Plexaurella nutans at right back

Scientific classification
- Kingdom: Animalia
- Phylum: Cnidaria
- Subphylum: Anthozoa
- Class: Octocorallia
- Order: Malacalcyonacea
- Family: Plexauridae
- Genus: Plexaurella
- Species: P. nutans

Binomial name
- Plexaurella nutans (Duchassaing & Michelotti, 1860)

Synonyms
- Campanularia flabellata Hincks, 1866

= Plexaurella nutans =

Species of coral

Plexaurella nutans, the giant slit-pore sea rod, is a tall species of soft coral in the family Plexauridae. It is a relatively uncommon species and is found in shallow seas in the Caribbean region.

== Description ==
Plexaurella nutans can grow to a height of over a metre (yard). It has thick cylindrical branches that occasionally fork and which are often slightly clubbed at the tips. These have a diameter of 10 to 15 centimetres (3.9 to 5.9 in). The polyps are rather large and protrude from round, oval or slit-shaped grooves in the cup-shaped calyces in the coral skeleton. Each of these calyces is on a slight mound giving the coral a dimpled surface. When the polyps are extended, as they usually are, they give the coral a fuzzy appearance. The colour of this coral is usually pale brown, grey or sometimes lavender.

== Distribution and habitat ==
Plexaurella nutans is an uncommon species and occurs at depths down to 50 metres (160 ft) in the Caribbean Sea, the Bahamas and Florida. It is usually found on isolated patch reefs or on forereef slopes.

== Biology ==
The polyps of Plexaurella nutans extend their tentacles to feed on zooplankton and other small invertebrates floating past. The food gathered is shared with neighbouring polyps via the gastrovascular cavity inside the coral's skeleton. After particles of liver marked with a radioactive tracer were fed experimentally to a single polyp, radioactivity was detected in tissues up to 11 centimetres (4.3 in) away.

Plexaurella nutans is a zooxanthellate species of coral with large numbers of symbiotic dinoflagellates from the genus Symbiodinium living in its tissues. These are photosynthetic algae that provide nourishment to their host while benefiting from the coral's waste products. It was found experimentally that different species of Symbiodinium were found at different depths in Plexaurella nutans and other corals. If the corals' tissues were cultured in the laboratory, other species again became apparent, the growth of which was favoured by the laboratory environment. These must have been undetected in the tissues previously.
