= Euniolide =

Names
- IUPAC name (1S,3R,5R,8E,12E,15S)-5,9,13-Trimethyl-18-methylidene-4,16-dioxatricyclo[13.3.0.03,5]octadeca-8,12-dien-17-one

Identifiers
CAS Number	131829-98-6
3D model (JSmol)	Interactive image
ChemSpider	27026073
PubChem CID	100921068
- InChI: InChI=1S/C20H28O3/c1-13-7-5-8-14(2)11-17-16(15(3)19(21)22-17)12-18-20(4,23-18)10-6-9-13/h8-9,16-18H,3,5-7,10-12H2,1-2,4H3/b13-9+,14-8+/t16-,17-,18+,20+/m0/s1 Key: DFVBARBOGQRBPH-BVLQWSETSA-N
- SMILES: C/C/1=C\CC[C@@]2([C@H](O2)C[C@@H]3[C@H](C/C(=C/CC1)/C)OC(=O)C3=C)C

Properties
Chemical formula	C_{20}H_{28}O_{3}
Molar mass	316.441 g·mol^{−1}
- Except where otherwise noted, data are given for materials in their standard state (at 25 °C [77 °F], 100 kPa). Infobox references

Euniolide is a cembrene-like diterpene from the Caribbean gorgonians Eunicea succinea and Eunicea mammosa.
