= Swiftia rosea =

Scientific classification
- Kingdom: Animalia
- Phylum: Cnidaria
- Subphylum: Anthozoa
- Class: Octocorallia
- Order: Malacalcyonacea
- Family: Plexauridae
- Genus: Swiftia
- Species: S. rosea

Binomial name
- Swiftia rosea (Grieg, 1887)

Synonyms
- Stenogorgia rosea

Species of coral

Swiftia rosea is a species of gorgonian-type octocoral in the family Plexauridae.

== Description ==
Colonies of this sea fan are usually 15 to 20 cm (6 to 8 in) high. There is usually a single main stem with a few branches at an angle to the main stem but in a single plane. The polyps are in two rows on the thicker branches but near the tips they are closer together and more disordered. The colour of this sea fan is dark red. The polyps are colourless and cannot be retracted back into the branches. This sea fan resembles the closely related but rather less common Swiftia pallida, but is more densely branched.

== Distribution and habitat ==
Swiftia rosea is native to the northeastern Atlantic Ocean including Scandinavia, Great Britain and Ireland. This sea fan also occurs in deep water on the continental shelf off the Atlantic coast of North America. It is typically found in cold waters within the depth range 30 to 400 metres (98 to 1,312 ft) in localities with good water flow. In suitable habitats, populations can be quite dense.
