= Villogorgia rubra =

Scientific classification
- Kingdom: Animalia
- Phylum: Cnidaria
- Subphylum: Anthozoa
- Class: Octocorallia
- Order: Malacalcyonacea
- Family: Plexauridae
- Genus: Villogorgia
- Species: V. rubra

Binomial name
- Villogorgia rubra (Hiles, 1899)

Species of coral

Villogorgia rubra is a species of colonial soft coral sea fan in the family Plexauridae. The scientific name of the species was first validly published in 1899 by Isa Hiles.

== See also ==
- N-Methyltryptamine
- Hallucinogenic fish
