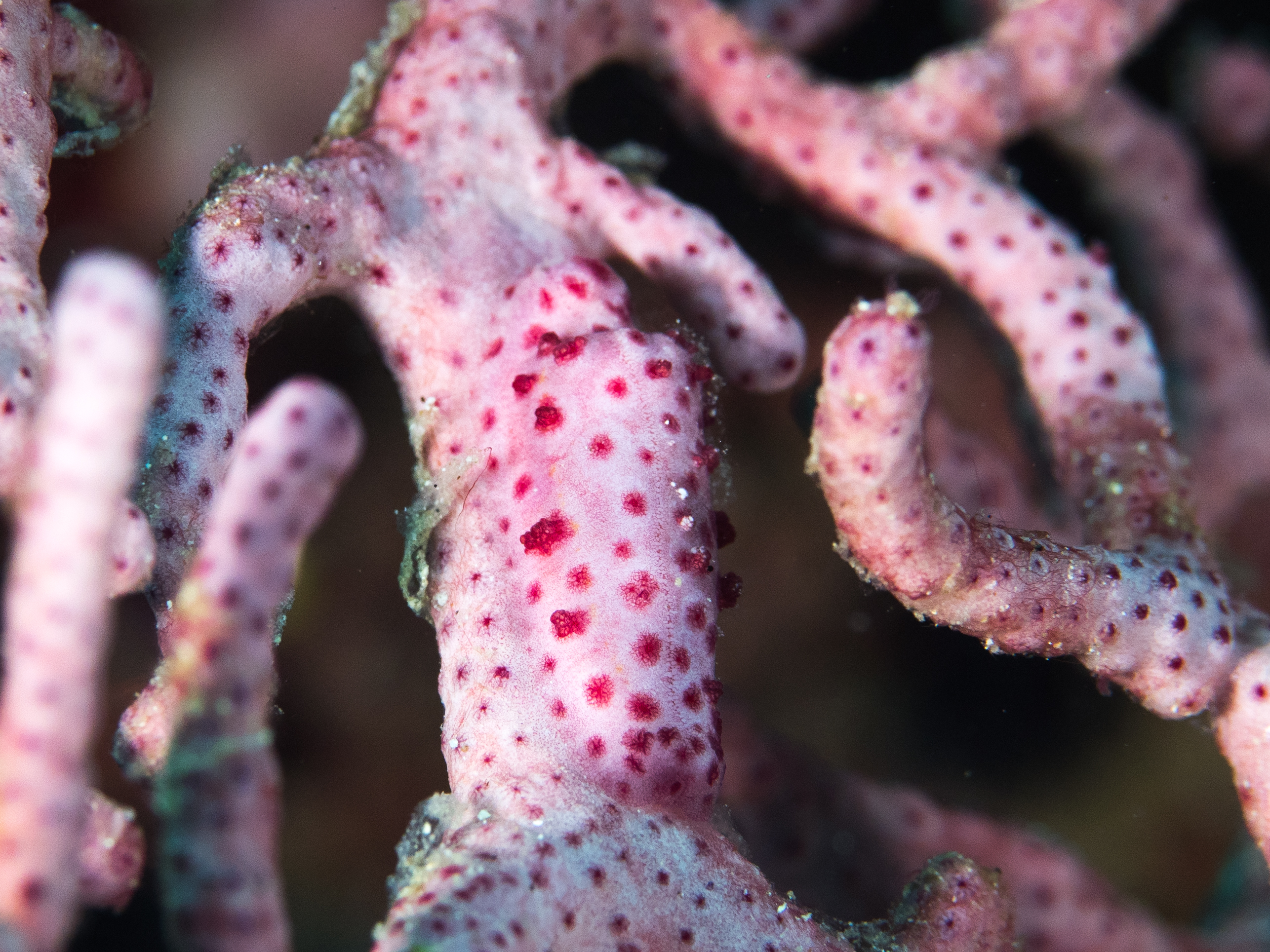
- Amonovula piriei may be difficult to spot.

Scientific classification
- Kingdom: Animalia
- Phylum: Mollusca
- Class: Gastropoda
- Subclass: Caenogastropoda
- Order: Littorinimorpha
- Family: Ovulidae
- Genus: Amonovula
- Species: A. piriei

Binomial name
- Amonovula piriei (Petuch, 1973)

Synonyms
- Primovula piriei Petuch, 1973 (original combination); Prosimnia piriei (Petuch, 1973)

= Amonovula piriei =

Species of gastropod

Amonovula piriei is a species of sea snail, a marine gastropod mollusk in the family Ovulidae, the ovulids, cowry allies or false cowries.

== Description ==
Amonovula piriei has an elongated, compact shell, cylindrical in shape and up to 22 mm (0.9 in) in length. It is plain and shiny, and has a long slit on the underside through which the mantle protrudes. When the snail is alive, the mantle almost completely covers the shell for most of the time. Two short tentacles and two tiny eyes are sometimes visible at the front when the animal is active and the only other part of the soft tissues which can be seen is the small part of the pale pink foot which trails behind when the animal moves. The mantle is white and translucent, with contrasting pustules, which mimic the polyps of the host gorgonian. The snail is a master of camouflage; it achieves this by feeding on the host's tissues and making use of the pigments so that it matches the colour of its host.

== Distribution and habitat ==
Amonovula piriei is native to the western Pacific Ocean, being present in the Solomon Islands, Papua New Guinea, New Caledonia, Malaysia, the Philippines and Indonesia. It exclusively lives on warm water gorgonians in the genera Euplexaura and Echinogorgia, at depths between about 5 and 50 m (16 and 164 ft).

== Ecology ==
Amonovula piriei feeds on the tissues and polyps of the gorgonians on which it lives, and can be considered an ectoparasite. The sexes are separate in this species; the female deposits a cluster of a few dozen egg capsules on the host, with several hundred embryos developing in each capsule. The larvae are planktonic and drift with the current, but will need to settle on a suitable gorgonian host in order to continue their development. This false cowrie is well camouflaged so that it is difficult to detect, but may be locally abundant; on the reefs of Poindimié in New Caledonia, for example, each gorgonian may host as many as a dozen of the molluscs.
