= Swiftia comauensis =

Scientific classification
- Kingdom: Animalia
- Phylum: Cnidaria
- Subphylum: Anthozoa
- Class: Octocorallia
- Order: Malacalcyonacea
- Family: Plexauridae
- Genus: Swiftia
- Species: S. comauensis

Binomial name
- Swiftia comauensis Breedy, Cairns & Haussermann, 2015

Species of coral

Swiftia comauensis species of gorgonian-type octocoral in the family Plexauridae, only found in the Comau fiords of Huinay in the Hualaihué province of the region of Los Lagos, Chile.

Like the other cold corals, the stony corals of the Comau fiord region, Desmophyllum dianthus, Caryophyllia huinayensis and Tethocyathus endesa they found in unusually shallow water on fiord walls 15m down and below.

== Distribution and habitat ==
Its complex network of fiords and islands has made it popular with industrial salmon aquaculture, as well as significant mussel farms. It is threatened with extinction from aquaculture dropping faeces, or nutrients firstly causing sedimentation, secondly supporting the conditions for harmful algal blooms through primary production and eutrophication. This is supplemented by internationally significant use of antibiotics, copper from antifouling, abandoned gear and invasive salmon species escapees.

It is also threatened by sedimentation and smothering from a new road proposed close to the fiord walls where the remaining population is found.

Historic overfishing from long lines and shellfish diving has also been a concern.

The marine indigenous community of Mañihueico-Huinay (Espacio Costero Marino de Pueblos Indigenarios) are concerned for its future and are looking for international support in its preservation, as well as those other cold coral species threatened listed above.
