= Swiftia pallida =

Conservation status
- Data Deficient (IUCN 3.1) (Mediterranean)

Scientific classification
- Kingdom: Animalia
- Phylum: Cnidaria
- Subphylum: Anthozoa
- Class: Octocorallia
- Order: Malacalcyonacea
- Family: Plexauridae
- Genus: Swiftia
- Species: S. pallida

Binomial name
- Swiftia pallida Madsen, 1970

Synonyms
- Gorgonia pinnata Johnston, 1847; Swiftia rosea ssp. pallida Madsen, 1970

Species of coral

Swiftia pallida is a species of gorgonian-type octocoral in the family Plexauridae sometimes known as the northern sea fan. At one time it was considered to be a subspecies of Swiftia rosea.

== Description ==
Swiftia pallida usually has a single main stem arising from a narrow base and is sparsely branched. Its normal height is about 80 mm (3 in) but it can grow to 200 mm (8 in). The polyps are mostly arranged alternately, but somewhat irregularly, on either side of the stem and branches. Each polyp is supported by eight spindle-shaped sclerites, spiny skeletal elements, which run from the stem or branch to the bases of the eight tentacles. In the north of its range, this species is usually white or pale grey, but in the Mediterranean it may be pink or red. This sea fan resembles pale varieties of the more common Swiftia rosea but is less bushy with fewer branches.

== Distribution and habitat ==
Swiftia pallida is native to the northeast Atlantic Ocean, the Mediterranean Sea, the Bay of Biscay, Madeira and Morocco. In the northern part of this range its depth range is between 15 and 60 metres (49 and 197 ft) but in the southern part it occurs in very deep water, possibly as deep as 2,380 metres (7,810 ft). This sea fan also occurs in deep water on the continental shelf off the Atlantic coast of North America. It is found on rocks in tide-swept areas that are sheltered from excessive wave action. It often occurs in areas where a layer of sediment covers the rocks, or on large pebbles lying on a silty or broken shell seabed.

== Ecology ==
The sea fan anemone (Amphianthus dohrnii) seems to live exclusively on sea fans. In the northern part of its range it is associated with Swiftia pallida, and in the southern part with the pink sea fan (Eunicella verrucosa). The rate of growth of Swiftia pallida is unknown but may be similar to that of Eunicella verrucosa, about 1 cm (0.4 in) per year.
