= Prosimnia draconis =

Scientific classification
- Kingdom: Animalia
- Phylum: Mollusca
- Class: Gastropoda
- Subclass: Caenogastropoda
- Order: Littorinimorpha
- Family: Ovulidae
- Genus: Prosimnia
- Species: P. draconis

Binomial name
- Prosimnia draconis Cate, 1973

Synonyms
- Prosimnia semperi draconis Cate, 1973

Species of gastropod

Prosimnia draconis is a species of sea snail, a marine gastropod mollusk in the family Ovulidae, the ovulids, cowry allies or false cowries.
