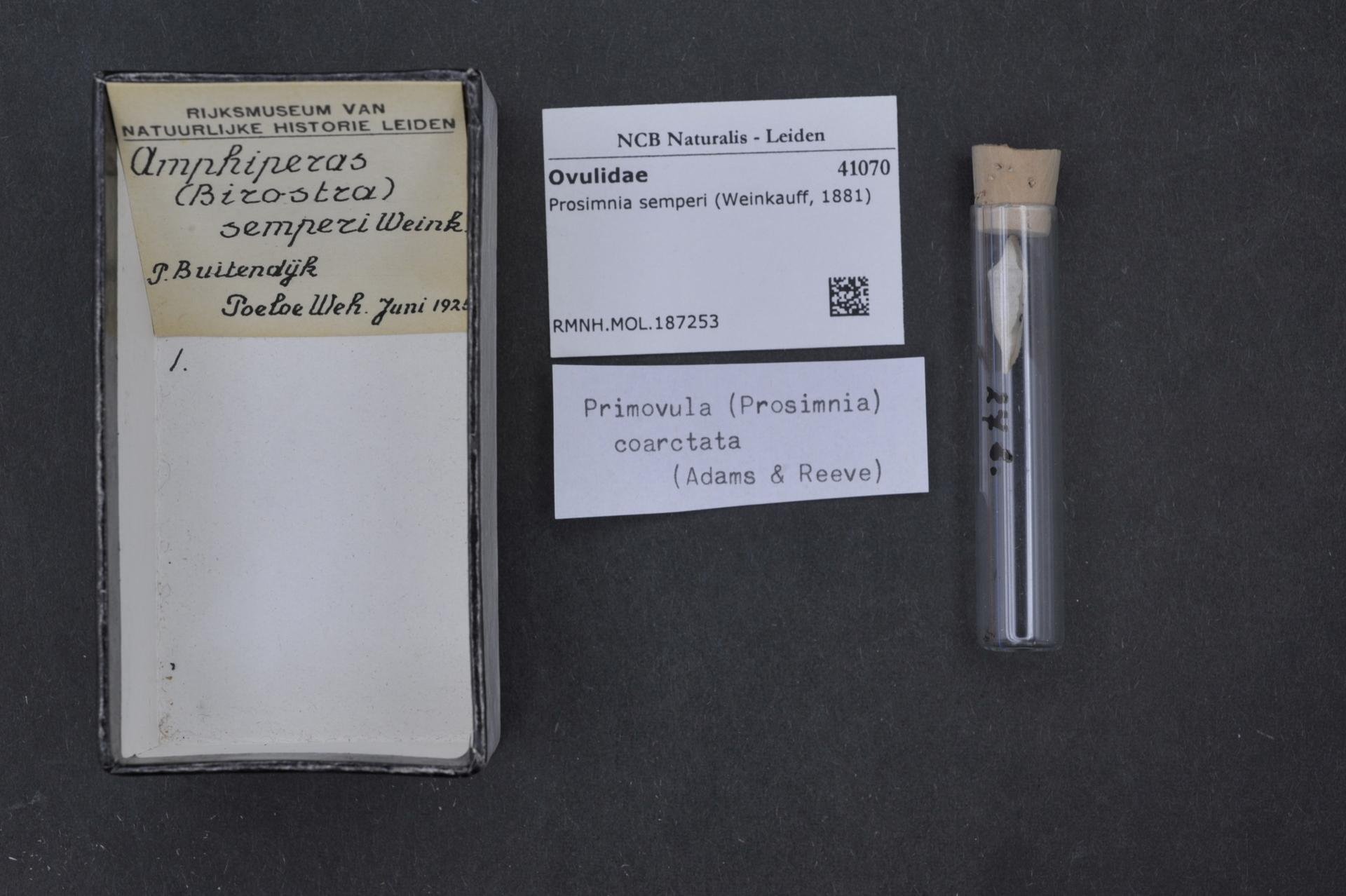

Scientific classification
- Kingdom: Animalia
- Phylum: Mollusca
- Class: Gastropoda
- Subclass: Caenogastropoda
- Order: Littorinimorpha
- Family: Ovulidae
- Genus: Prosimnia
- Species: P. semperi

Binomial name
- Prosimnia semperi (Weinkauff, 1881)

Synonyms
- Ovula hordacea Lamarck, 1810; Ovula sempieri Weinkauff, 1881; Ovula triticea Fischer, 1927; Ovulum hordaceum Sowerby I, 1830; Primovula coarctaca Schilder, 1941

= Prosimnia semperi =

Species of gastropod

Prosimnia semperi is a species of sea snail, a marine gastropod mollusk in the family Ovulidae, the ovulids, cowry allies or false cowries.

== Distribution ==
P. semperi is native to the coasts of Madagascar and parts of South Africa.
