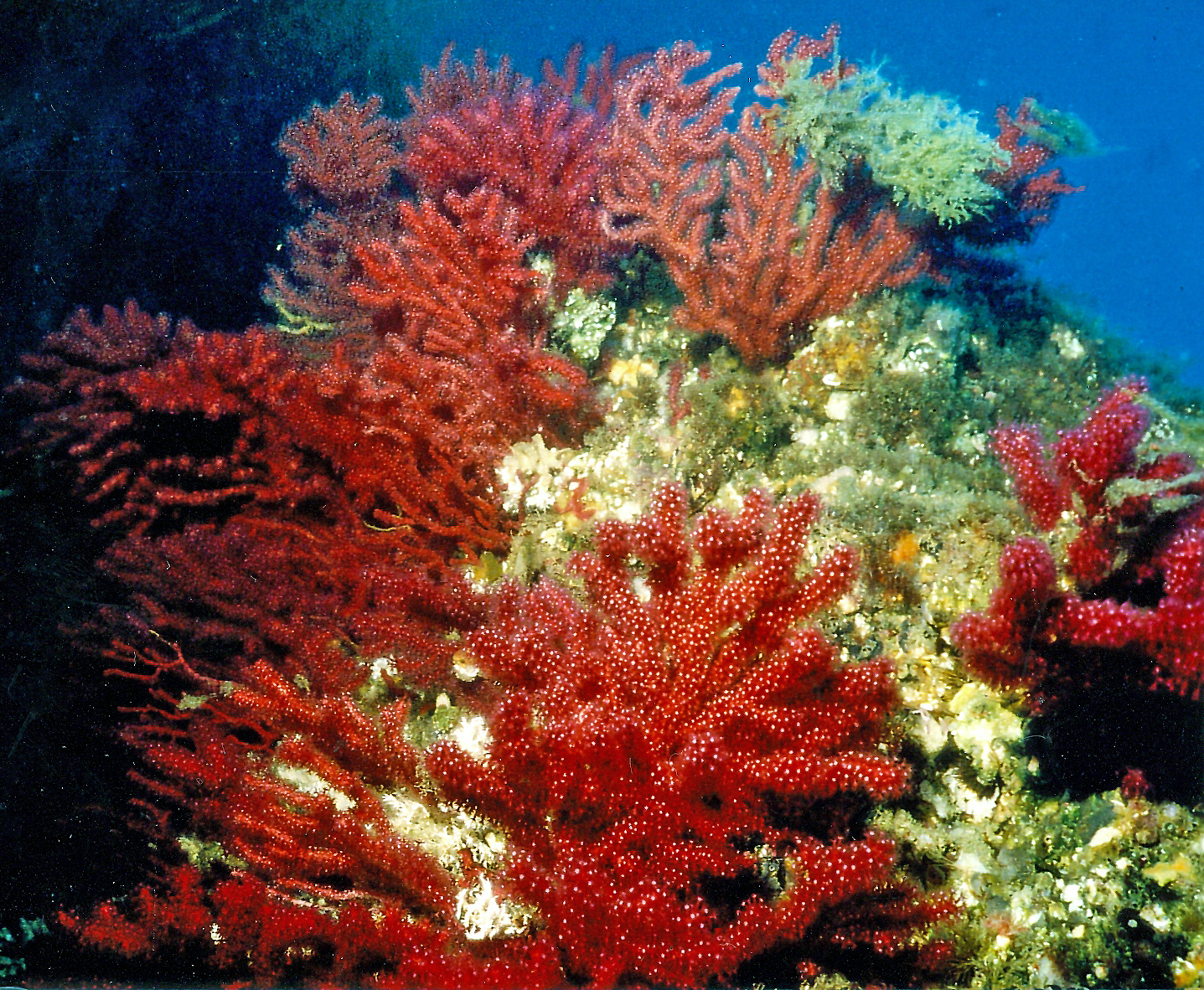
- Paramuricea clavata with polyps expanded

Conservation status
- Vulnerable (IUCN 3.1) (Mediterranean)

Scientific classification
- Kingdom: Animalia
- Phylum: Cnidaria
- Subphylum: Anthozoa
- Class: Octocorallia
- Order: Malacalcyonacea
- Family: Plexauridae
- Genus: Paramuricea
- Species: P. clavata

Binomial name
- Paramuricea clavata (Risso, 1826)

Synonyms
- Anthomuricea chamaeleon (von Koch, 1882); Clematissa chamaeleon (von Koch, 1882); Gorgonia clavata (Risso, 1826); Muricea chamaeleon (von Koch, 1882); Muriceides chamaeleon (von Koch, 1882); Paramuricea chamaeleon (von Koch, 1882)

= Paramuricea clavata =

Species of coral

Paramuricea clavata, the violescent sea-whip, is a species of colonial soft coral in the family Plexauridae. It is found in shallow seas of the north-eastern Atlantic Ocean and the north-western Mediterranean Sea as well as the Ionian Sea. This species was first described by the French naturalist Antoine Risso in 1826.

== Description ==
P. clavata has a branching structure forming a fan-shaped colony in a single plane. The stem and branches are stiffened by gorgonin, a complex protein that produces a horny skeleton. The coenenchyme, a thin living layer of cells, covers the skeleton, and the polyps protrude from this, each with eight feeding tentacles surrounding a central mouth. The polyps are up to 10 mm (0.4 in) high and the whole colony up to one m (3 ft) high and 1 m across. The colour is usually red, but may be partly yellow.

== Distribution and habitat ==
The violescent sea-whip is native to the coasts of Spain and Portugal in the eastern Atlantic Ocean, and to the western Mediterranean Sea. It grows on reefs with its base buried in the sediment at depths between 10 and 100 m (33 and 328 ft), but usually between 15 and 40 m (49 and 131 ft). It is considered to be an ecosystem engineer, as its presence alters the flow of water, changes sedimentation rates, and alters the distribution of nutrients, thus affecting many organisms in its vicinity.

== Biology ==
P. clavata is a filter feeder, the polyps extending their tentacles to catch food particles floating past. Its diet includes copepods, diatoms, dinoflagellates, ciliates, and organic carbon particles in suspension.

Each colony is either male or female. Sperm is liberated into the sea by the male colonies, and fertilisation occurs on the surface of the female colonies. The embryos are brooded there before being released as planula larvae into the water column. The larvae are photophobic and soon settle on the seabed. Once there, they develop into polyps and start secreting gorgonin to form the skeleton. Further growth of the colony is by the budding of new polyps. Some new colonies may be formed from fragments that become detached from existing colonies. P. clavata is a slow-growing species, and colonies probably live for well over 50 years.
