= Prosimnia korkosi =

Scientific classification
- Kingdom: Animalia
- Phylum: Mollusca
- Class: Gastropoda
- Subclass: Caenogastropoda
- Order: Littorinimorpha
- Family: Ovulidae
- Genus: Prosimnia
- Species: P. korkosi

Binomial name
- Prosimnia korkosi Fehse, 2005

Species of gastropod

Prosimnia korkosi is a species of sea snail, a marine gastropod mollusk in the family Ovulidae, the ovulids, cowry allies or false cowries.
