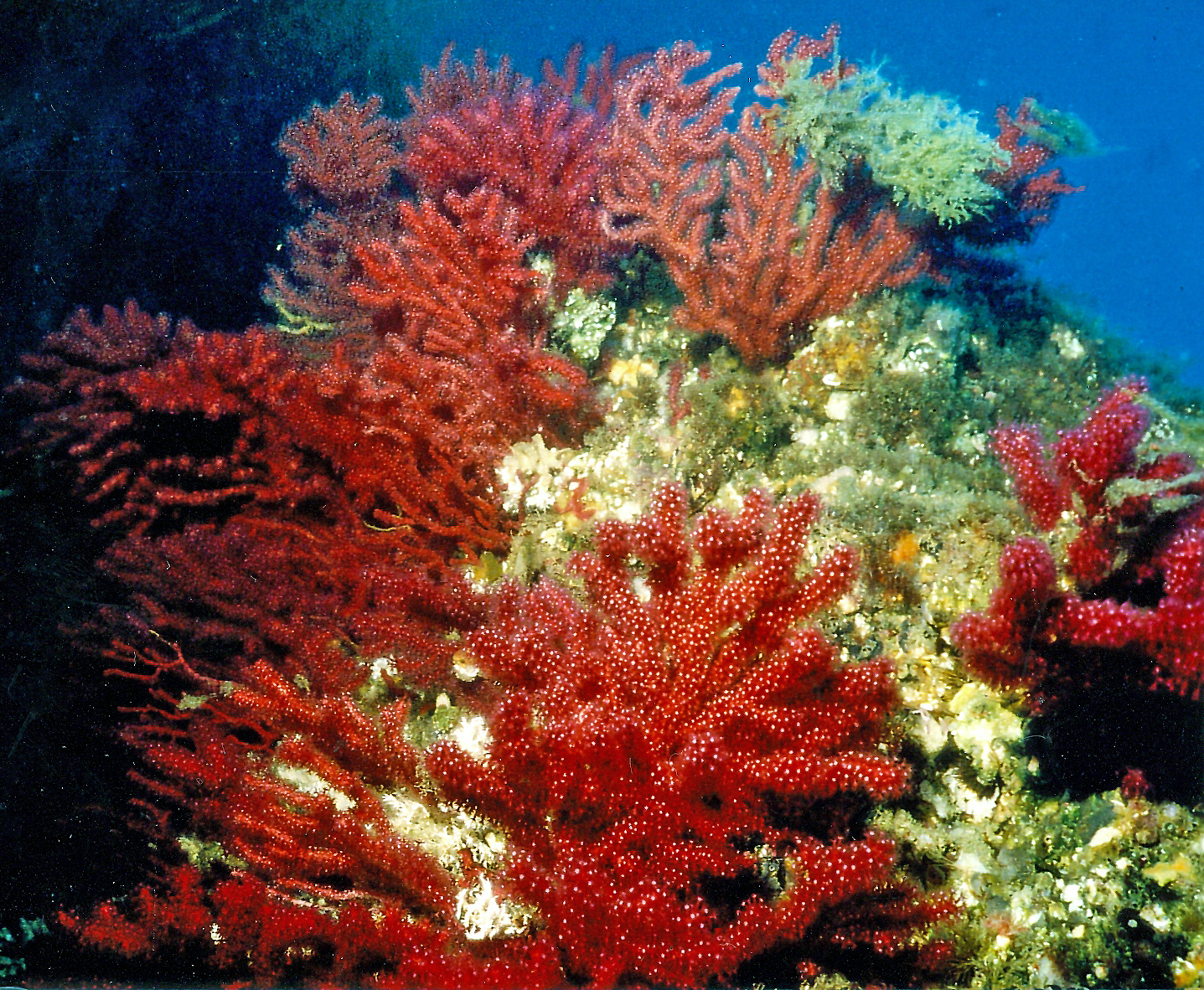
- Paramuricea clavata

Scientific classification
- Kingdom: Animalia
- Phylum: Cnidaria
- Subphylum: Anthozoa
- Class: Octocorallia
- Order: Malacalcyonacea
- Family: Plexauridae
- Genus: Paramuricea; Koelliker, 1865

Species
- See text

= Paramuricea =

Genus of corals

Paramuricea is a genus of gorgonian-type octocorals in the family Plexauridae.

== Species ==
The World Register of Marine Species lists these species:

- Paramuricea aequatorialis Wright & Studer, 1889
- Paramuricea biscaya Grasshoff, 1977
- Paramuricea candida Grasshoff, 1977
- Paramuricea clavata (Risso, 1826)
- Paramuricea echinata Deichmann, 1936
- Paramuricea grandis Verrill, 1883
- Paramuricea grayi (Johnson, 1861)
- Paramuricea hawaiensis Nutting, 1908
- Paramuricea hirsuta (Gray, 1851)
- Paramuricea hyalina Kükenthal, 1919
- Paramuricea indica Thomson & Henderson, 1906
- Paramuricea intermedia Kölliker, 1865
- Paramuricea johnsoni (Studer, 1878)
- Paramuricea laxa Wright & Studer, 1889
- Paramuricea macrospina (Koch, 1882)
- Paramuricea multispina Deichmann, 1936
- Paramuricea placomus (Linnaeus, 1758)
- Paramuricea ramosa Wright & Studer, 1889
- Paramuricea robusta Thomson & Ritchie, 1906
- Paramuricea spinosa Kölliker, 1865
- Paramuricea tenuis Verrill, 1883
