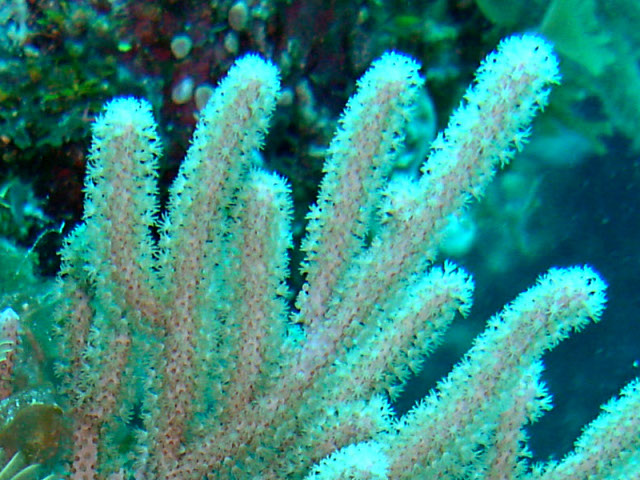
- Eunicea mammosa

Scientific classification
- Kingdom: Animalia
- Phylum: Cnidaria
- Subphylum: Anthozoa
- Class: Octocorallia
- Order: Malacalcyonacea
- Family: Plexauridae
- Genus: Eunicea; Lamouroux, 1816

Species
- See text

= Eunicea =

Genus of corals

Eunicea is a genus of gorgonian-type octocorals in the family Plexauridae. These branched octocorals typically have knobby protuberances from which the polyps protrude. They are often stiffened by purple sclerites and some colonies, in brightly lit back-reef areas are purple, though most colonies are brown or grey. The polyps in some species are large and feathery in appearance. The growth of these corals is rapid and they can be kept in a reef aquarium.

== Species ==
The World Register of Marine Species lists these species:

- Eunicea aspera Duchassaing & Michelotti, 1860
- Eunicea asperula Milne Edwards & Haime, 1857
- Eunicea calyculata (Ellis & Solander, 1786)
- Eunicea castelnaudi Milne Edwards & Haime, 1857
- Eunicea citrina Valenciennes, 1855
- Eunicea clavigera Bayer, 1961
- Eunicea distans Duchassaing & Michelotti, 1860
- Eunicea echinata Valenciennes, 1855
- Eunicea esperi Duchassaing & Michelotti, 1860
- Eunicea flexuosa (Lamouroux, 1821)
- Eunicea fusca Duchassaing & Michelotti, 1860
- Eunicea gracilis Valenciennes, 1855
- Eunicea heteropora (Lamarck, 1816)
- Eunicea hicksoni Stiasny, 1935
- Eunicea hirta Duchassaing & Michelotti, 1860
- Eunicea humilis Milne Edwards, 1857
- Eunicea inexpectata Stiasny, 1939
- Eunicea knighti Bayer, 1961
- Eunicea laciniata Duchassaing & Michelotti, 1860
- Eunicea laxispica (Lamarck, 1815)
- Eunicea lugubris Duchassaing & Michelotti, 1860
- Eunicea madrepora (Dana, 1846)
- Eunicea mammosa Lamouroux, 1816
- Eunicea multicauda (Lamarck, 1816)
- Eunicea pallida Garcia Parrado & Alcolado, 1996
- Eunicea palmeri Bayer, 1961
- Eunicea pinta Bayer & Deichmann, 1958
- Eunicea sayoti Duchassaing & Michelotti, 1860
- Eunicea sparsiflora Kunze, 1916
- Eunicea stromyeri Duchassaing & Michelotti, 1860
- Eunicea succinea (Pallas, 1766)
- Eunicea tayrona Sánchez, 2009
- Eunicea tourneforti Milne Edwards & Haime, 1857
- Eunicea turgida Ehrenberg, 1834
