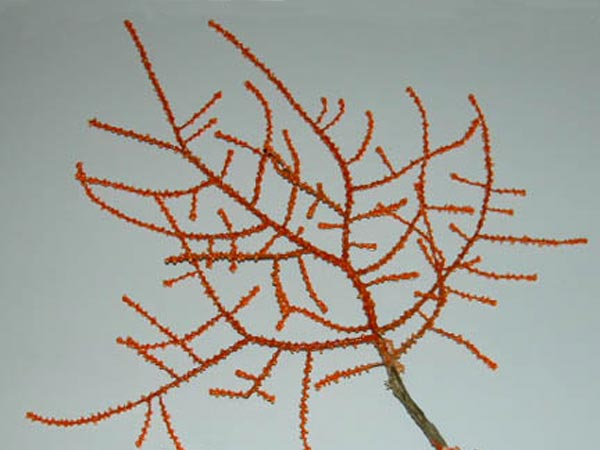
- Swiftia sp.

Scientific classification
- Kingdom: Animalia
- Phylum: Cnidaria
- Subphylum: Anthozoa
- Class: Octocorallia
- Order: Malacalcyonacea
- Family: Plexauridae
- Genus: Swiftia; Duchassaing & Michelotti, 1864

Species
- See text

= Swiftia =

Genus of corals

Swiftia is a genus of gorgonian-type octocorals in the family Plexauridae.

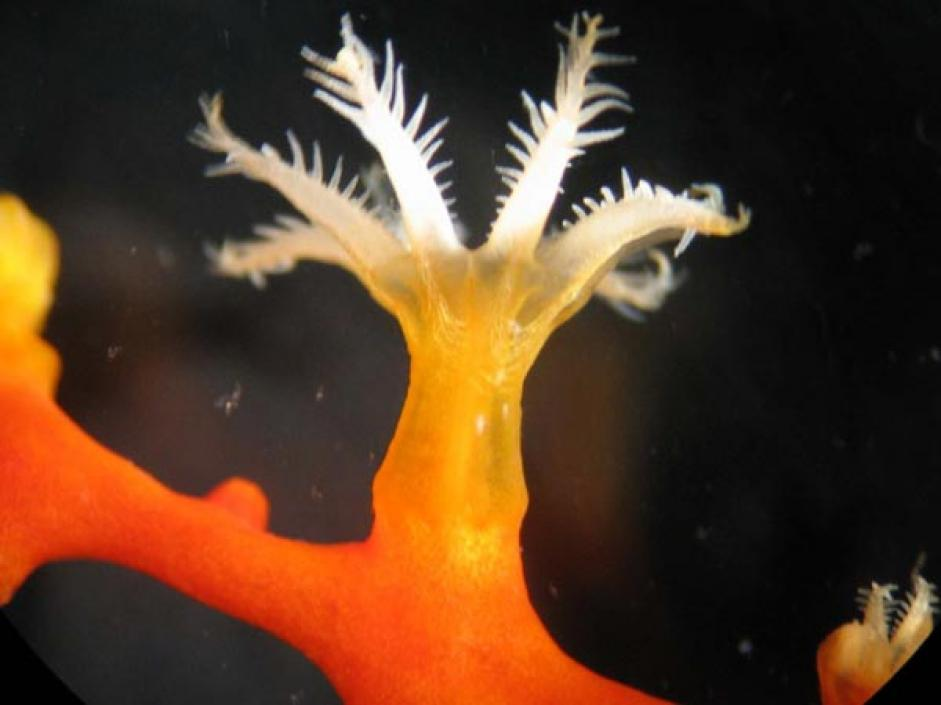
With tentacles spread for feeding

== Species ==
The World Register of Marine Species lists the following species:

- Swiftia africana (Kükenthal, 1919)
- Swiftia borealis (Kramp, 1930)
- Swiftia casta (Verrill, 1883)
- Swiftia comauensis Breedy, Cairns & Haussermann, 2015
- Swiftia dubia (Thomson, 1929)
- Swiftia exserta (Ellis & Solander, 1786)
- Swiftia farallonesica Williams & Breedy, 2016
- Swiftia kofoidi (Nutting, 1909)
- Swiftia koreni (Studer, 1889)
- Swiftia miniata (Valenciennes, 1855)
- Swiftia pacifica (Nutting, 1912)
- Swiftia pallida Madsen, 1970
- Swiftia pourtalesii Deichmann, 1936
- Swiftia rosea (Grieg, 1887)
- Swiftia sibogae (Nutting, 1910)
- Swiftia simplex (Nutting, 1909)
- Swiftia spauldingi (Nutting, 1909)
- Swiftia studeri (Nutting, 1910)
- Swiftia torreyi (Nutting, 1909)
