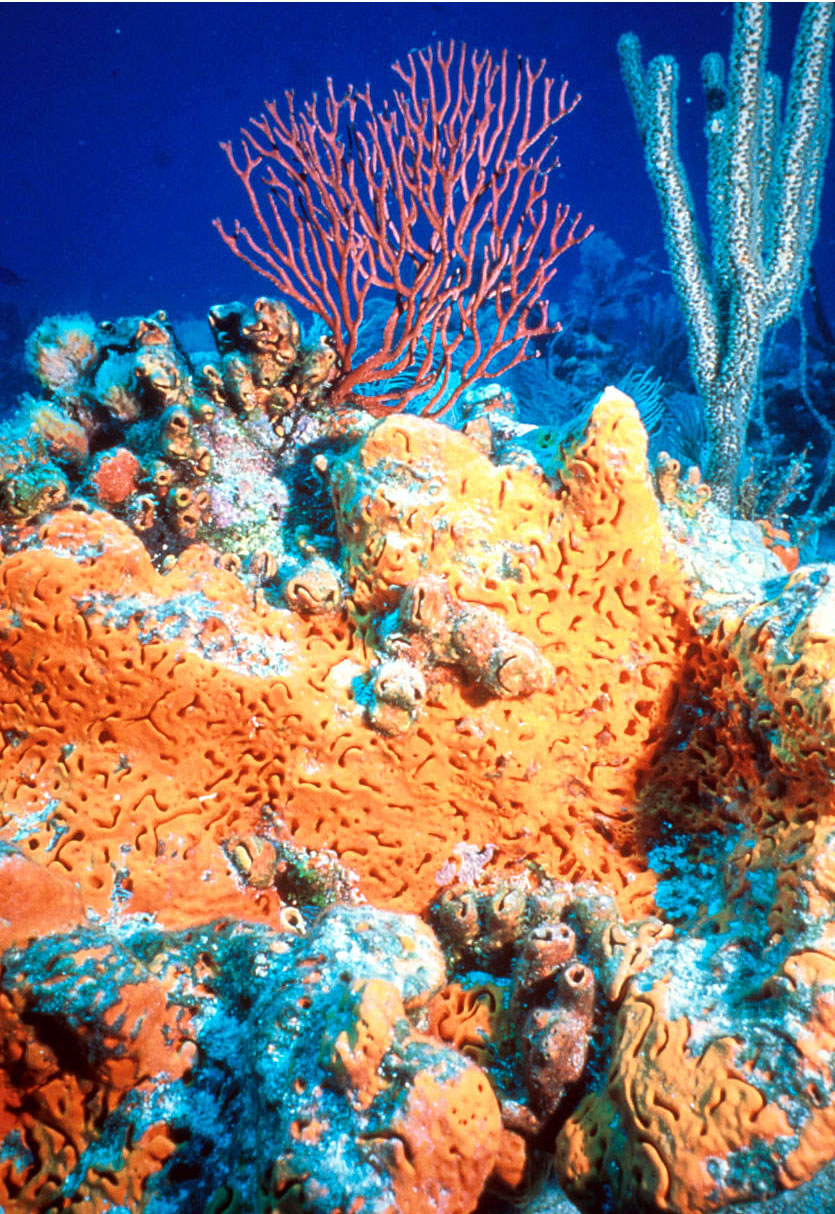
- Coral reef assembly with Plexaurella nutans at right back

Scientific classification
- Kingdom: Animalia
- Phylum: Cnidaria
- Subphylum: Anthozoa
- Class: Octocorallia
- Order: Malacalcyonacea
- Family: Plexauridae
- Genus: Plexaurella; Kölliker, 1865

Species
- See text

= Plexaurella =

Genus of corals

Plexaurella is a genus of gorgonian-type octocorals in the family Plexauridae. Species of the genus are typically characterised by their slit-pores, however, there are some which lack this distinguishing feature (e.g. P. grisea). Sclerite examination is necessary for species identification, which reveals the characteristic 4-rayed 'butterfly' spicules of the cortex and the lack of purple sclerites in the axial sheath.

== Species ==
The World Register of Marine Species lists the following species in the genus:

- Plexaurella crassa (Ellis, 1756)
- Plexaurella curvata Kunze, 1916
- Plexaurella dichotoma (Esper, 1791)
- Plexaurella furcata (Lamarck, 1816)
- Plexaurella grandiflora Verrill, 1912
- Plexaurella grisea Kunze, 1916
- Plexaurella heteropora (Lamarck, 1816)
- Plexaurella kunzei Kükenthal, 1916>
- Plexaurella minuta Kunze, 1916
- Plexaurella nutans (Duchassaing & Michelotti, 1860)
- Plexaurella regia Barreira e Castro, 1986
- Plexaurella tenuis Kunze, 1916
- Plexaurella teres Kunze, 1916
- Plexaurella vermiculata (Lamarck, 1816)
