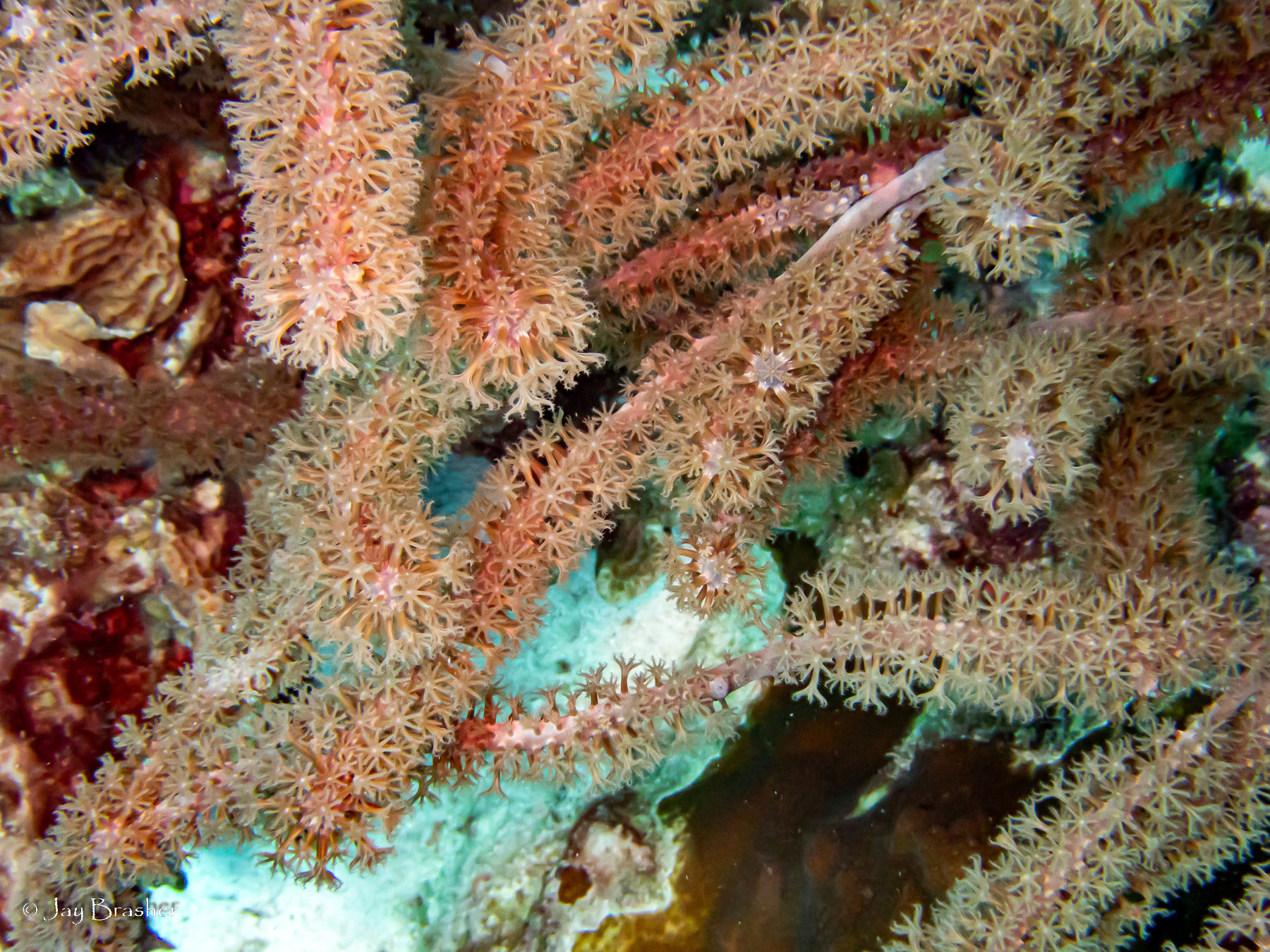
- Muriceopsis flavida

Scientific classification
- Kingdom: Animalia
- Phylum: Cnidaria
- Subphylum: Anthozoa
- Class: Octocorallia
- Order: Malacalcyonacea
- Family: Plexauridae
- Genus: Muriceopsis; Aurivillius, 1931

Species
- See text

= Muriceopsis =

Genus of corals

Muriceopsis is a genus of gorgonian-type, branching colonial octocorals in the family Plexauridae. They are found on shallow water reefs and are capable of developing sweeper tentacles. The growth of these corals is rapid and they can be kept in a reef aquarium.

== Species ==
The World Register of Marine Species lists the following species:

- Muriceopsis bayeriana Sánchez, 2007
- Muriceopsis flavida (Lamarck, 1815)
- Muriceopsis metaclados Castro, Medeiros & Loiola, 2010
- Muriceopsis petila Bayer, 1961
- Muriceopsis sulphurea (Donovan, 1825)
- Muriceopsis tuberculata (Esper, 1792)
