= Astrogorgia =

Scientific classification
- Kingdom: Animalia
- Phylum: Cnidaria
- Subphylum: Anthozoa
- Class: Octocorallia
- Order: Malacalcyonacea
- Family: Plexauridae
- Genus: Astrogorgia; Verrill, 1868

Genus of corals

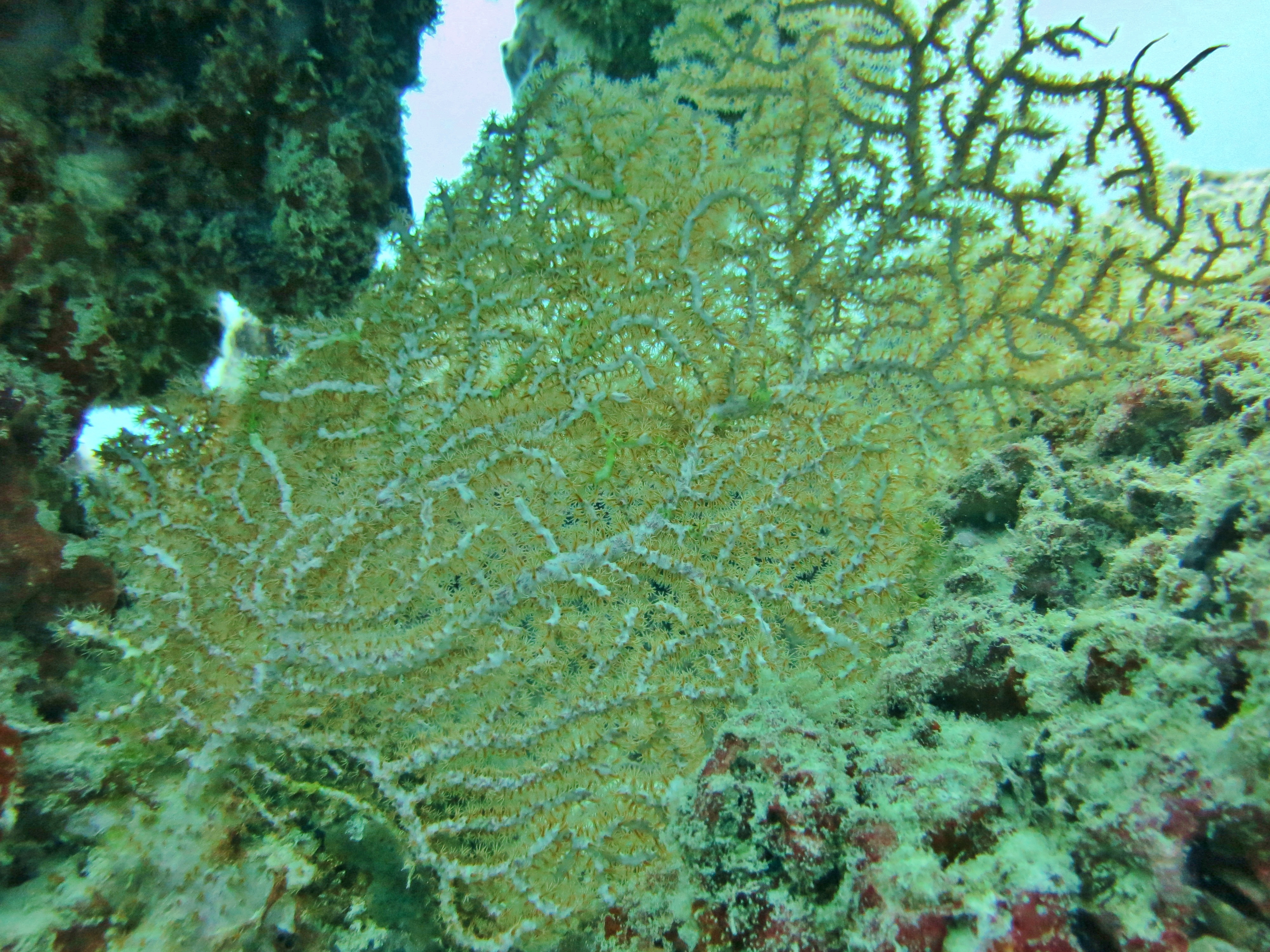

Astrogorgia is a genus of soft corals that look like fans and belong to the family Plexauridae and the order Alcyonacea. Addison Emery Verrill established the genus in 1868. It is known for playing an important ecological role in coral reef ecosystems and for having a lot of potential for pharmacological research because it contains bioactive natural substances.

The species of this genus are found in Southeastern Asia, Indian Ocean.

== Taxonomy and Classification ==
Astrogorgia sinensis was the type species when the genus was founded in 1868. Due to phenotypic variability and inconsistent identification records, the genus's classification has experienced substantial changes throughout history. Molecular biology (COI, ND2, and MSH gene fragment sequencing) and morphological analysis (sclerite analysis using electronic microscopy) are the two main methods used in modern identification.

== Morphological Characteristics ==
The physical characteristics of Astrogorgia species include the following:

Colony Form: irregular lateral branches and a fan-shaped (flabellate) structure. Interestingly, the branches do not merge to form a closed network (non-anastomosing).

Vibrant hues such as dark red, red, pink, orange, yellow, cream, or tan are displayed by colonies.

Spicules (Sclerites): The internal structural components have a spindle-like form. These sclerites can be colourless or have red, orange, or yellow hues. They are frequently longer than the diameter of the branches. Structure: Spicule arrangement and the unique features of polyps, coenenchyme, and tentacles are frequently used for identification.

== Species ==
Species:

- Astrogorgia arborea (Thomson & Simpson, 1909)
- Astrogorgia balinensis Hermanlimianto & van Ofwegen, 2006
- Astrogorgia bayeri van Ofwegen & Hoeksema, 2001
