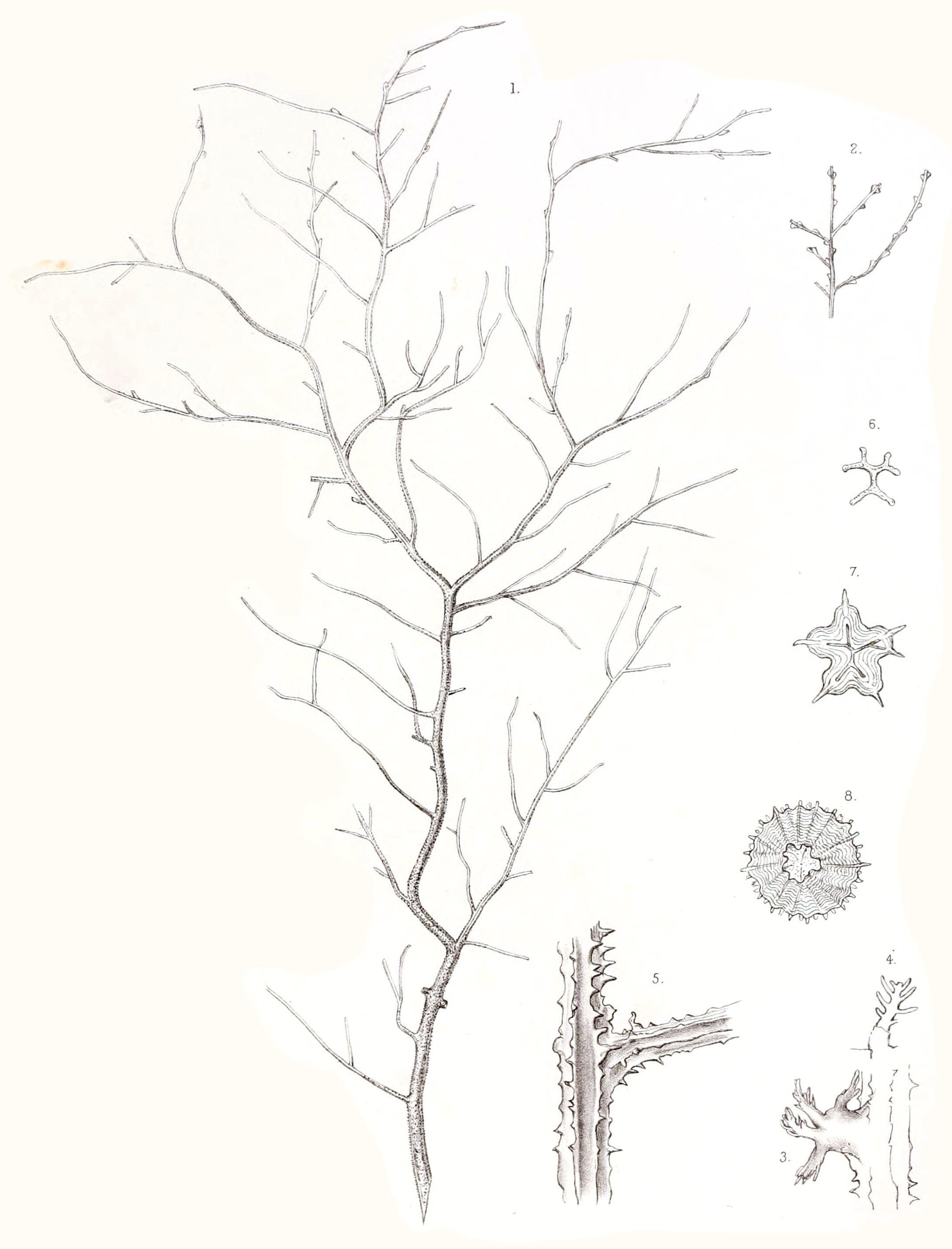
- Dendrobrachia fallax

Scientific classification
- Kingdom: Animalia
- Phylum: Cnidaria
- Subphylum: Anthozoa
- Class: Octocorallia
- Order: Scleralcyonacea
- Family: Dendrobrachiidae; Brook, 1889
- Genus: Dendrobrachia; Brook, 1889

= Dendrobrachia =

Genus of corals

Dendrobrachia is a genus of soft corals in the monotypic family Dendrobrachiidae. Dendrobrachiidae is in the order Scleralcyonacea.

== Species ==
The following species are recognized within the genus:

- Dendrobrachia bonsai López-González & Cunha, 2010
- Dendrobrachia fallax Brook, 1889
- Dendrobrachia multispina Opresko & Bayer, 1991
- Dendrobrachia paucispina Opresko & Bayer, 1991
- Dendrobrachia sarmentosa López-González & Cunha, 2010
