= Acanthomuricea =

Scientific classification
- Domain: Eukaryota
- Kingdom: Animalia
- Phylum: Cnidaria
- Class: Octocorallia
- Order: Alcyonacea
- Family: Plexauridae
- Genus: Acanthomuricea; Hentschel, 1903

Genus of corals

Acanthomuricea is a genus of corals belonging to the family Plexauridae.

The species of this genus are found in Malesia, Southern Africa.

Species:

- Acanthomuricea biserialis Hentschel, 1903
- Acanthomuricea dina Grasshoff, 2000
- Acanthomuricea mberea Grasshoff, 1999
- Acanthomuricea pulchra (J.S.Thomson, 1911)
- Acanthomuricea purpurea (Whitelegge, 1897)
- Acanthomuricea ramosa Thomson & Henderson, 1906
- Acanthomuricea silpa Grasshoff, 2000
- Acanthomuricea uimea Grasshoff, 1999
