= Lepidomuricea =

Scientific classification
- Domain: Eukaryota
- Kingdom: Animalia
- Phylum: Cnidaria
- Subphylum: Anthozoa
- Class: Octocorallia
- Order: Alcyonacea
- Family: Plexauridae
- Genus: Lepidomuricea; Kükenthal, 1919

Genus of corals

Lepidomuricea is a genus of corals belonging to the family Plexauridae.

The species of this genus are found in Australia, India.

Species:

- Lepidomuricea ramosa (Thomson & Henderson, 1906)
- Lepidomuricea spicata (Thomson & Henderson, 1906)
