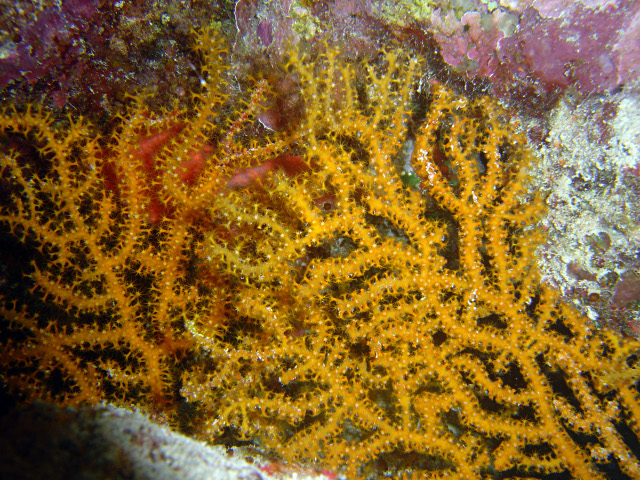
- Bebryce sulfurea

Scientific classification
- Kingdom: Animalia
- Phylum: Cnidaria
- Subphylum: Anthozoa
- Class: Octocorallia
- Order: Malacalcyonacea
- Family: Plexauridae
- Genus: Bebryce; Philippi, 1841

Species
- See text

= Bebryce =

Genus of corals

Bebryce is a genus of gorgonian-type octocorals in the family Plexauridae.

== Species ==
The World Register of Marine Species lists the following species:

- Bebryce asteria Bayer & van Ofwegen, 2016
- Bebryce bocki Aurivillius, 1931
- Bebryce boninensis Aurivillius, 1931
- Bebryce brunnea (Nutting, 1908)
- Bebryce cactus Bayer, 1994
- Bebryce cinerea Deichmann, 1936
- Bebryce cofferi Bayer & van Ofwegen, 2016
- Bebryce crucifera (Bayer, 1981)
- Bebryce densa Tixier-Durivault, 1972
- Bebryce grandicalyx Kükenthal, 1924
- Bebryce grandis Deichmann, 1936
- Bebryce harpy Grasshoff, 1999
- Bebryce hicksoni Thomson & Henderson, 1905
- Bebryce indica Thomson, 1905
- Bebryce inermis Samimi Namin & van Ofwegen, 2010
- Bebryce mollis Philippi, 1842
- Bebryce otsuchiensis Matsumoto & van Ofwegen, 2016
- Bebryce parastellata Deichmann, 1936
- Bebryce philippii Studer, 1889
- Bebryce rigida Tixier-Durivault, 1972
- Bebryce rotunda Matsumoto & van Ofwegen, 2016
- Bebryce satsumaensis Matsumoto & van Ofwegen, 2016
- Bebryce sirene Grasshoff, 1999
- Bebryce studeri Whitelegge, 1897
- Bebryce sulfurea Grasshoff, 2000
- Bebryce tenuis Thomson & Simpson, 1909
- Bebryce thomsoni Nutting, 1910
