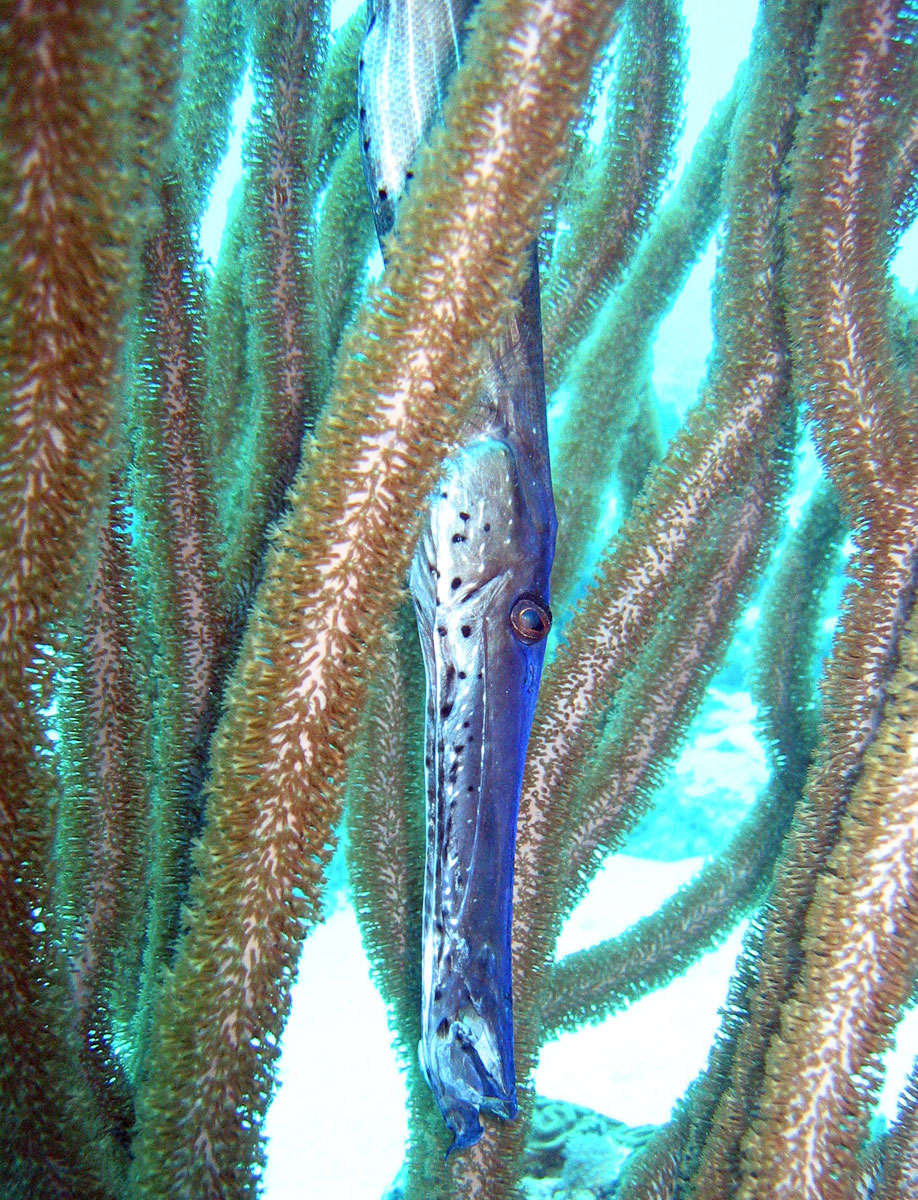
- Trumpetfish (Aulostomus maculatus) hiding in a colony of Pseudoplexaura sp.

Scientific classification
- Kingdom: Animalia
- Phylum: Cnidaria
- Subphylum: Anthozoa
- Class: Octocorallia
- Order: Malacalcyonacea
- Family: Plexauridae
- Genus: Pseudoplexaura; Wright & Studer, 1889

Species
- See text

= Pseudoplexaura =

Genus of corals

Pseudoplexaura is a genus of gorgonian-type octocorals in the family Plexauridae. They form tall, branching, tree-like colonies and are native to reefs in the Caribbean Sea and the Gulf of Mexico.

== Species ==
The World Register of Marine Species lists the following species:

- Pseudoplexaura crucis Bayer, 1961
- Pseudoplexaura flagellosa (Houttuyn, 1772)
- Pseudoplexaura porosa (Houttuyn, 1772)
- Pseudoplexaura wagenaari (Stiasny, 1941)

== Uses ==
Pseudoplexaura spp. can be kept in a reef aquarium. They grow vigorously and detached branches can be used to propagate new colonies.
