= Paracis =

Scientific classification
- Domain: Eukaryota
- Kingdom: Animalia
- Phylum: Cnidaria
- Subphylum: Anthozoa
- Class: Octocorallia
- Order: Alcyonacea
- Family: Plexauridae
- Genus: Paracis; Kükenthal, 1919

Genus of corals

Paracis is a genus of corals belonging to the family Plexauridae.

The species of this genus are found in Pacific and Indian Ocean, Caribbean.

== Species ==
Species:

- Paracis alba (Thomson & Henderson, 1905)
- Paracis alternans (Thomson & Russell, 1910)
- Paracis bebrycoides (Nutting, 1910)
