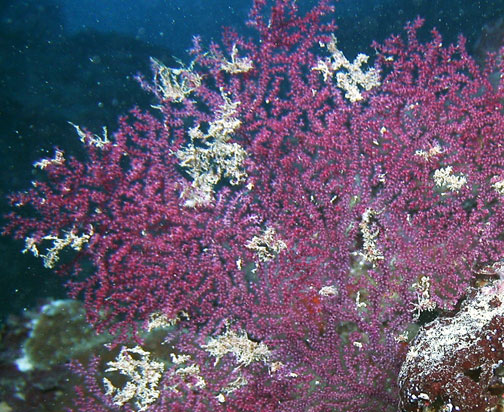
- Villogorgia sp. in American Samoa

Scientific classification
- Kingdom: Animalia
- Phylum: Cnidaria
- Subphylum: Anthozoa
- Class: Octocorallia
- Order: Malacalcyonacea
- Family: Plexauridae
- Genus: Villogorgia; Duchassaing & Michelloti, 1862

Species
- See text

= Villogorgia =

Genus of corals

Villagorgia is a genus of gorgonian-type octocorals in the family Plexauridae.

== Species ==
The World Register of Marine Species lists these species:

- Villogorgia acanthostoma (Germanos)
- Villogorgia alternans (Wright & Studer)
- Villogorgia antillarum (Aurivillius, 1931)
- Villogorgia arbuscula (Gray, 1889)
- Villogorgia atra (Thomson & Henderson)
- Villogorgia aurivilliusi (Stiasny, 1942)
- Villogorgia bebrycoides (Koch, 1887)
- Villogorgia brunnea (Nutting, 1912)
- Villogorgia ceylonensis (Thomson & Henderson, 1905)
- Villogorgia circium (Thomson & Henderson)
- Villogorgia citrina (Grasshoff, 1999)
- Villogorgia compressa (Hiles, 1899)
- Villogorgia cristata (Aurivillius, 1931)
- Villogorgia dubia (Kükenthal, 1924)
- Villogorgia elegans (Tixier-Durivault, 1972)
- Villogorgia fallax (Kükenthal)
- Villogorgia flabellata (Gray, 1870)
- Villogorgia flagellata (Whitelegge, 1897)
- Villogorgia flavescens (Nutting, 1910)
- Villogorgia foliata (Thomson & Russell)
- Villogorgia fruticosa (Germanos)
- Villogorgia glaesaria (Grasshoff, 1999)
- Villogorgia gracilis (Studer, 1878)
- Villogorgia gracilis (Thomson, 1905)
- Villogorgia intricata (Gray, 1870)
- Villogorgia japonica (Aurivillius, 1931)
- Villogorgia mabalith (Grasshoff, 2000)
- Villogorgia mauritiensis (Ridley, 1882)
- Villogorgia nigrescens (Duchassaing & Michelotti, 1860)
- Villogorgia nozzolea (Grasshoff, 1996)
- Villogorgia robusta (Thomson & Henderson)
- Villogorgia rubra (Hiles, 1899)
- Villogorgia serrata (Nutting, 1910)
- Villogorgia spatulata (Nutting, 1910)
- Villogorgia tenuis (Nutting, 1908)
- Villogorgia teretiflora (Aurivillius, 1931)
- Villogorgia timorensis (Nutting, 1910)
- Villogorgia tuberculata (Hiles)
- Villogorgia zimmmermani (Bayer, 1949)
