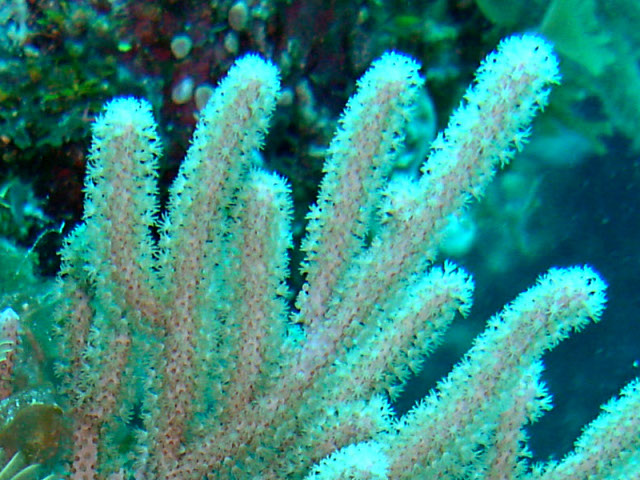

Scientific classification
- Kingdom: Animalia
- Phylum: Cnidaria
- Subphylum: Anthozoa
- Class: Octocorallia
- Order: Malacalcyonacea
- Family: Plexauridae
- Genus: Eunicea
- Species: E. mammosa

Binomial name
- Eunicea mammosa Lamouroux, 1816

= Eunicea mammosa =

Species of cnidarian

Eunicea mammosa is a species of soft coral of the family Plexauridae, described by Jean Vincent Félix Lamouroux in 1816. Common names for the species include swollen-knob candelabrum.
