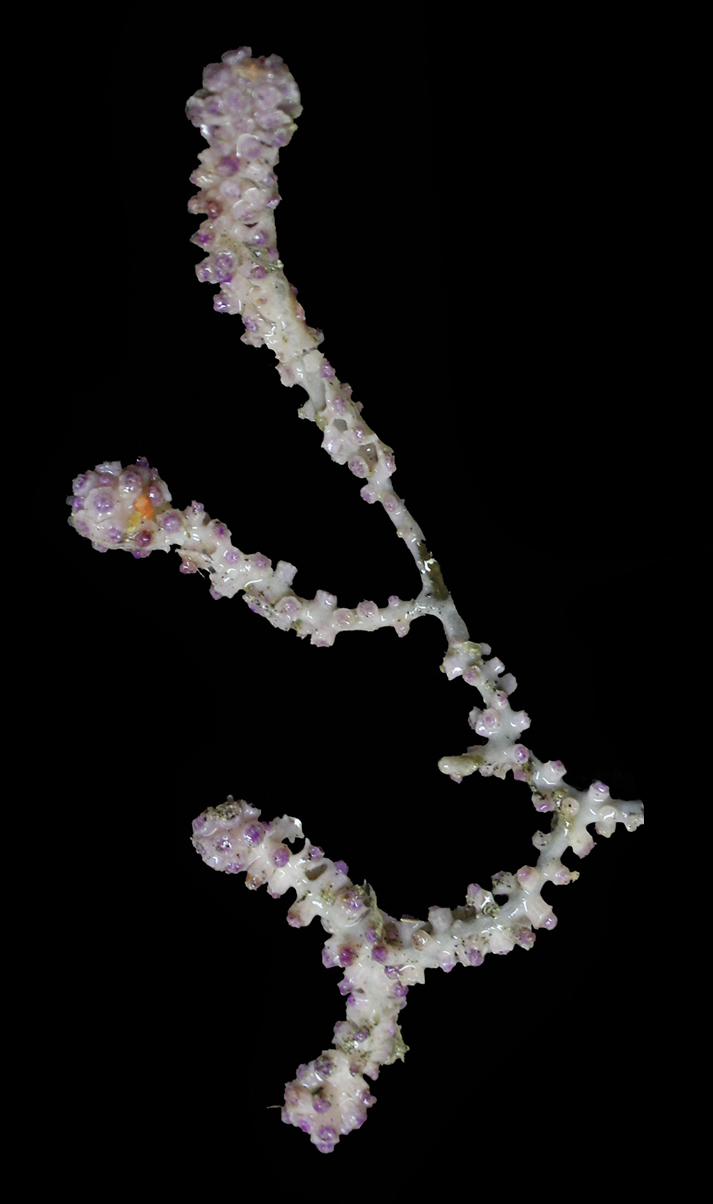
- Bayergorgia vermidoma

Scientific classification
- Kingdom: Animalia
- Phylum: Cnidaria
- Subphylum: Anthozoa
- Class: Octocorallia
- Order: incertae sedis
- Genus: Bayergorgia; Williams & Lopez-Gonzalez, 2005
- Species: B. vermidoma

Binomial name
- Bayergorgia vermidoma Williams & Lopez-Gonzalez, 2005

= Bayergorgia =

Genus of corals

Bayergorgia is a monotypic genus of corals belonging to the family Plexauridae. The only species is Bayergorgia vermidoma.

The species is found in southernmost South America.
