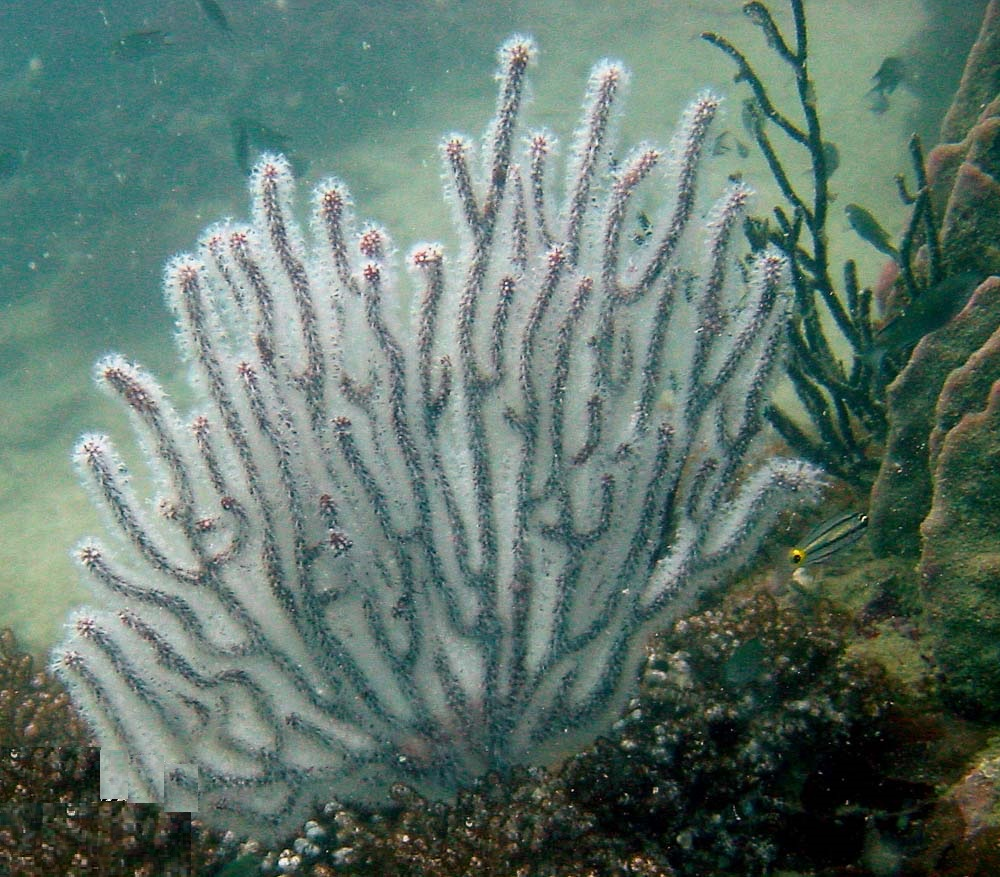
- Echinogorgia, sea-fan

Scientific classification
- Domain: Eukaryota
- Kingdom: Animalia
- Phylum: Cnidaria
- Class: Octocorallia
- Order: Alcyonacea
- Family: Plexauridae
- Genus: Echinogorgia; Kölliker, 1865

= Echinogorgia =

Genus of corals

Echinogorgia is a genus of corals belonging to the family Plexauridae.

The species of this genus are found in Pacific and Indian Ocean.

== Species ==
The amount of estimated species is 50.

Species:

- Echinogorgia abietina Kükenthal, 1919
- Echinogorgia armata (Kükenthal, 1909)
- Echinogorgia aurantiaca (Valenciennes, 1855)
