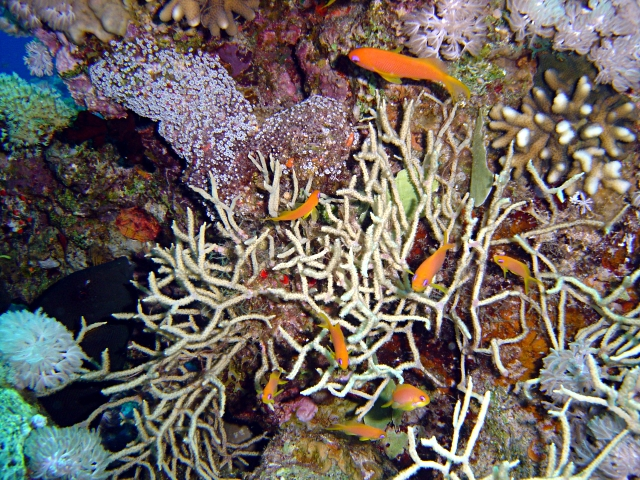

Scientific classification
- Kingdom: Animalia
- Phylum: Cnidaria
- Subphylum: Anthozoa
- Class: Octocorallia
- Order: Malacalcyonacea
- Family: Plexauridae
- Genus: Euplexaura; Verrill, 1869

= Euplexaura =

Genus of corals

Euplexaura is a genus of cnidarians belonging to the family Plexauridae.

The species of this genus are found in Pacific and Indian Ocean.

== Species ==
Species:

- Euplexaura abietina Kükenthal, 1908
- Euplexaura albida Kükenthal, 1908
- Euplexaura amerea Grasshoff, 1999
