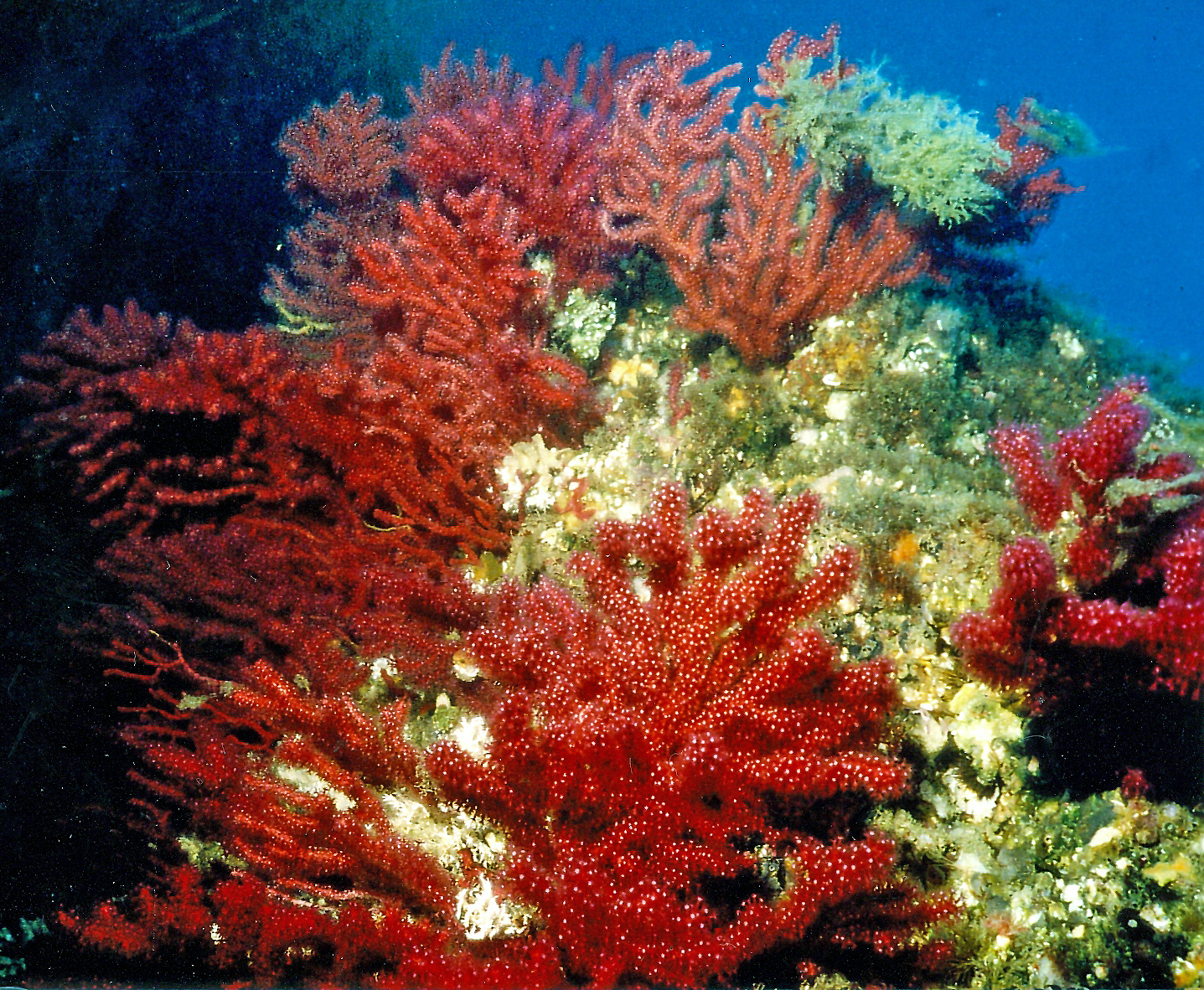
- Paramuricea clavata with polyps extended

Scientific classification
- Kingdom: Animalia
- Phylum: Cnidaria
- Subphylum: Anthozoa
- Class: Octocorallia
- Order: Malacalcyonacea
- Family: Plexauridae; Gray, 1859

Genera
- See text

= Plexauridae =

Family of corals

Plexauridae is a family of marine colonial octocorals in the phylum Cnidaria. Members of this family are found in shallow tropical and subtropical seas. Many species contain symbiotic photosynthetic protists called zooxanthellae.

== Characteristics ==
The Plexauridae have a branching colony form and many are known as sea rods or sea fans. The axial core of the coral skeleton is horny and hollow, and contains no sclerites. This is covered by a layer of tissue called coenenchyme in which is embedded calcareous sclerites. The sclerites are very varied in form in the Plexauridae, and examination of their morphology is helpful in identifying the different species. The calyces in which the polyps sit are strengthened by further sclerites and have eight fine dividing walls called septa. The polyps each have eight pinnate tentacles.

== Genera ==
The World Register of Marine Species includes these genera in this family:

- Eunicea Lamouroux, 1816
- Muricea Lamouroux, 1821
- Plexaura Lamouroux, 1821
- Pseudoplexaura Wright & Studer, 1889
- Swiftia Duchassaing & Michelotti, 1864

Before a 2022 taxonomic revision of the Octocorallia, the family also contained the following genera:

- Acanthacis Deichmann, 1936 (moved to Acanthogorgiidae)
- Acanthomuricea Hentschel, 1903 (moved to Astrogorgiidae)
- Acis Duchassaing & Michelotti, 1860
- Alaskagorgia Sánchez & Cairns, 2004 (Note: Genera left family incertae sedis due to insufficient molecular or morphological evidence.)
- Anthomuricea Studer, 1887 (moved to Acanthogorgiidae)
- Anthoplexaura Kükenthal, 1908 (moved to Astrogorgiidae)
- Astrogorgia Verrill, 1868 (moved to Astrogorgiidae)
- Astromuricea Germanos, 1895 (moved to Astrogorgiidae)
- Bayergorgia Williams & Lopez-Gonzalez, 2005
- Bebryce Philippi, 1841 (moved to Astrogorgiidae)
- Chromoplexaura Williams, 2013 (moved to Gorgoniidae)
- Cryogorgia Williams, 2005
- Dentomuricea Grasshoff, 1977 (moved to Astrogorgiidae)
- Discogorgia Kükenthal, 1919 (moved to Astrogorgiidae)
- Echinogorgia Kölliker, 1865 (moved to Astrogorgiidae)
- Echinomuricea Verrill, 1869 (moved to Astrogorgiidae)
- Elasmogorgia Wright & Studer, 1889
- Euplexaura Verrill, 1869 (moved to Euplexauridae)
- Heterogorgia Verrill, 1868 (moved to Astrogorgiidae)
- Hypnogorgia Duchassaing & Michelotti, 1864
- Lapidogorgia Grasshoff, 1999 (moved to Astrogorgiidae)
- Lepidomuricea Kükenthal, 1919 (moved to Astrogorgiidae)
- Lytreia Bayer, 1981 (moved to Astrogorgiidae)
- Menacella Gray, 1870 (moved to Astrogorgiidae)
- Menella Gray, 1870 (moved to Astrogorgiidae)
- Mesogligorgia Lopez-Gonzalez, 2007
- Muriceides Wright & Studer, 1889 (moved to Astrogorgiidae)
- Muriceopsis Aurivillius, 1931
- Paracis Kükenthal, 1919
- Paramuricea Koelliker, 1865 (moved to Astrogorgiidae)
- Paraplexaura Kükenthal, 1909 (moved to Astrogorgiidae)
- Placogorgia Wright & Studer, 1889 (moved to Astrogorgiidae)
- Plexaurella Kölliker, 1865
- Plexauroides Wright & Studer
- Plexauropsis Verrill (included in Plexaura)
- Psammogorgia Verrill, 1868 (moved to Gorgoniidae)
- Pseudothesea Kükenthal, 1919
- Scleracis Kükenthal, 1919
- Spinimuricea Grasshoff, 1992 (moved to Astrogorgiidae)
- Thesea Duchassaing & Michelotti, 1860
- Trimuricea Gordon, 1926 (moved to Astrogorgiidae)
- Villogorgia Duchassaing & Michelloti, 1862 (moved to Astrogorgiidae)

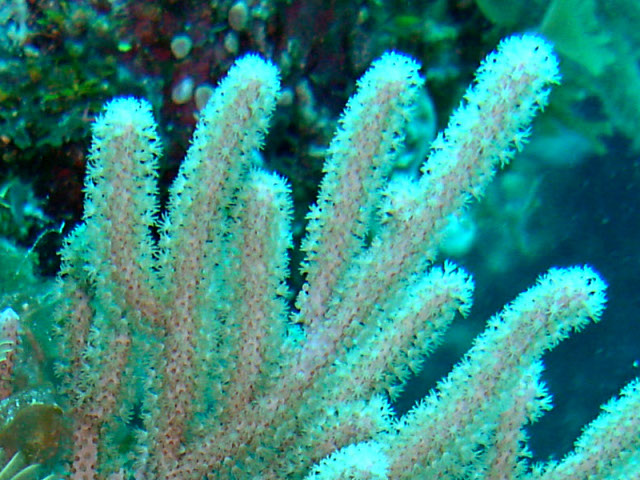
Eunicea mammosa

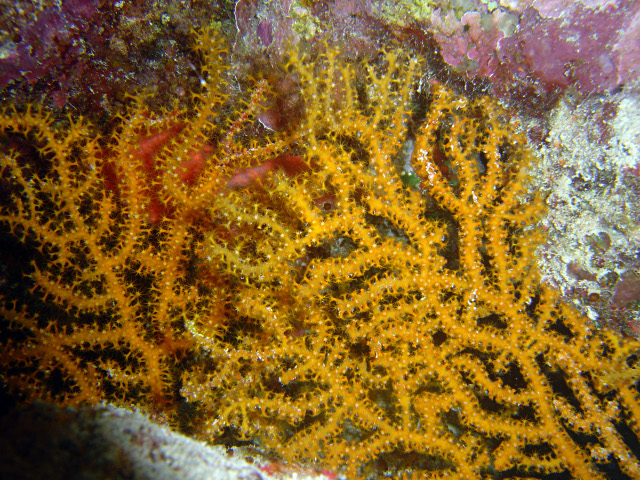
Bebryce sulfurea
