= Musicians Seamounts =

Chain of seamounts in the Pacific Ocean, north of the Hawaiian Ridge

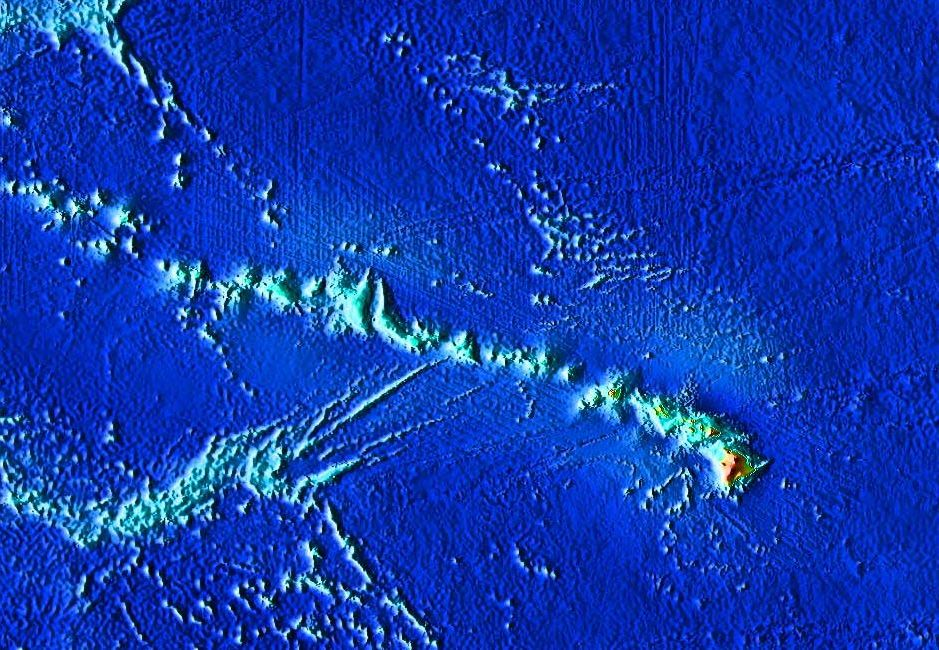
- Musicians Seamounts are in the upper-central sector of the map

- Location within Pacific Ocean

Location
- Location: North Pacific Ocean
- Coordinates: 30°N 162°W

Geology
- Volcanic arc/chain: Euterpe Hotspot
- Age of rock: Cretaceous
- Last eruption: 47.4 Ma

Musicians Seamounts (previously North Hawaiian Seamounts, North Hawaiian Seamount Range) are a chain of seamounts in the Pacific Ocean, north of the Hawaiian Ridge. There are about 65 seamounts, some of which are named after musicians. These seamounts exist in two chains, one of which has been attributed to a probably now-extinct hotspot called the Euterpe hotspot. Others may have formed in response to plate tectonics associated with the boundary between the Pacific plate and the former Farallon plate.

The seamounts were constructed on young oceanic crust during the Cretaceous, but a second phase of volcanic activity took place during the Eocene. Deep sea coral reefs occur on the seamounts.

== Geography and geomorphology ==
The Musicians Seamounts lie in the north-central Pacific, north of the Hawaiian Ridge north and northwest of Necker Island, extending over a length of 1,200 kilometres (750 mi). The seamounts were formerly known as the North Hawaiian Seamounts, or the North Hawaiian Seamount Range and were among the first submarine mountains to be thoroughly researched.

The seamounts consist of two separate chains (one trending in north–south direction parallel to the Emperor Seamounts and the other in northwest–southeast direction parallel to the northern Line Islands) of ridges that extend east–west and seamounts. Such a ridge has been called a volcanic elongated ridge (VER). Seamounts have usually an elliptical cross section and heights of 1,000–4,000 metres (3,300–13,100 ft) and no flat tops like other seamounts south of the Hawaiian Ridge; the highest is Liszt Seamount whose summit has a depth of 1,582 metres (5,190 ft). The ridges contain individual volcanoes and reach lengths of over 400 kilometres (250 mi); in the Italian (Note: In the northeasternmost Musicians Seamounts.) and Rapano (Bach) Ridges the volcanoes are 2.2–5.1 kilometres (1.4–3.2 mi) high. The Musicians horst and the Southern Ridges are additional features of the Musicians Seamounts. Larger than the seamounts are volcanic lineaments, on which the seamounts formed. Terrain observed by remotely operated vehicles shows large blocks, pillow lavas, flat terrain, lava flows and talus.

The name for the group was proposed in 1959. The total number of seamounts is about 65, some of which Henry William Menard named after 18th century musicians, and only about 25 are individually named. Among the seamounts known by name are:

Musicians Seamounts peak locations

Map of approximate surface projection of Musicians Seamount features above the sea floor abyssal plain (red) and of alignments of Murray fracture zone, and Pioneer fracture zone (light orange) at same scale as map above. The concept of volcanic elongated ridge (VER) is illustrated by the east-west alignment of many features.

Musicians seamounts and volcanic elongated ridge (VER)s of seamounts
| Name | Grouping | Coords | Age (Note: Technical issues mean published ages, particularly from older analysis could be inaccurate. For a discussion of the issues see Clouard et al. 2005. Recent compilations of ages may remove or adjust suspect ages, so age discrepancies need checking against original sources.) | Comments |
|---|---|---|---|---|
| Northwest Cluster | Euterpe | 33.48°N 166.53°W | 98.1±0.8 Ma | |
| Rossini | Italian VER | 32°12′N 163°00′W | - | |
| Bizet | Italian VER | 32.26667°N 161.633333°W | - | |
| Berlin | - | 32.85°N 166°W | - | |
| Stravinsky (Godard) | - | 31.483333°N 164.6°W | - | |
| Wagner | - | 31°46′N 162°54′W | - | |
| Shostakovich (Lange) | - | 33°16′N 164°53′W | - | |
| Strauss | - | 33°18′N 164°09′W | - | |
| Bellini | Italian VER | 32°42′N 163°11′W | - | |
| Verdi | - | 31.60°N 162.90°W | - | |
| Puccini | Italian VER | 32°15′N 162°21′W | - | |
| Schubert (Shubert) | - | 31.933333°N 162.15°W | - | |
| Donizetti | Italian VER | 32.33333°N 160.00°W | 94.7 Ma | |
| Hammerstein | - | 32.46°N 165.76°W | 96.8±2.5 Ma | |
| Mahler | - | 31.63°N 165.10°W | 91.5 Ma | |
| Brahms | Euterpe | 31.15940°N 162.37846°W | 92.2±0.8 Ma | |
| Mussorgski | Euterpe | 30°22′N 163°50′W | 86.0±0.45 Ma | Sample from summit so hotspot late stage |
| Debussy | Euterpe | 30.30°N 162.09°W | 91.45±0.44 Ma | |
| Dvorák (Dvorak, Dvorák) | - | 30°31′N 161°20′W | - | |
| Rachmaninoff | Euterpe | 29°35′16.6″N 163°21′0.6″W | 88.3±2.5 Ma | |
| Tchaikovsky (Tchaikovski) | - | 29.383333°N 162.083333°W | - | |
| Murray Ridge | Murray fracture zone | 29.26°N 160.41°W | 49.6 Ma | Has reactivated volcanism |
| Liszt | - | 29.00°N 162.00°W | 88.6±0.71 Ma | |
| Paganini (Mississippi) | - | 28°41′N 162°40′W | - | |
| Mozart | - | 28°40′N 161°43′W | 88.27±0.59 Ma | |
| Khachaturian | Euterpe | 28°8′27.9″N 162°18′54.6″W | 82.2±2.7 Ma | |
| Grieg | - | 27°51′N 162°03′W | - | |
| Gounod | - | 27°53′N 161°20′W | - | |
| Handel | - | 27.50°N 159.80°W | - | |
| Scarlatti | - | 27°38′5.7″N 160°14′10.5″W | - | |
| Ravel | - | 27°16′N 161°40′W | - | |
| Gluck | - | 26°53′N 160°06′W | - | |
| Sibelius | - | 27°13′N 160°44′W | - | |
| Chopin | - | 26.10°N 162.00°W | - | |
| Haydn | - | 26.67°N 161.20°W | 75.1 Ma | |
| Rapano (Bach) Ridge | Rapano VER | 26.58°N 158.83°W | 53.2, 53.7, 76.0, 47.4 Ma | Has reactivated volcanism |
| Beethoven Ridge | Beethoven VER | 26.16°N 158.42°W | 48.8 Ma | |
| West Schumann | Euterpe | 25.95°N 159.90°W | 85.6 Ma | |
| Schumann | Euterpe | - | 80.4 Ma | |
| Blackfin Ridge | Blackfin VER | - | 53.0 Ma | Southernmost VER from Schumann |
| West Mendelssohn | Euterpe | 25.13°N 161.95°W | 85 Ma | Has reactivated volcanism |
| East Mendelssohn | - | 25.18°N 161.60°W | 78.5 Ma | |
| Prokof'yev (Prokofiev) | - | 25°51′N 157°53′W | - | |
| Paumakua (Note: The name Paumaku may be being used for more than one seamount in the Pacific. It is not named in the Marine Gazetteer and a reference was identified that gave a different longitude but the reference may be in error. Two references were used to validate this name.) | - | 24.83°N 157.08°W | 65.5 Ma | |

== Geology ==
The Pacific Ocean floor beneath the seamounts is of Cretaceous age and is subdivided by the Murray Fracture Zone into an older northern (100 to 95 million years ago) and a younger southern (80 to 85 million years ago) sector. To the north, the Musicians Seamounts are limited by the Pioneer fracture zone. and just to its south are four unnamed seamounts of the Northwest cluster. The Musicians Seamounts developed on crust that was no more than 20 million years old, and paleomagnetic information indicates that the seamounts were located between 0 and 10° north of the equator when they developed. Only several of the seamounts reached above sea level.

Rock samples dredged from the seamounts include basalt, hawaiite, mugearite and trachyte. Minerals contained in the rocks consist of aegirine, augite, clinopyroxene, feldspar, oxidized olivine, orthopyroxene, plagioclase and pyroxene. Calcite, clay and zeolites have formed through alteration processes, and manganese nodules have been encountered as well. The petrogenesis of Musicians Seamounts magmas has been explained by the mixing of several mantle-derived components.

=== Origin ===
The origin of the seamounts has been explained with either one or two hotspots of Cretaceous age. Dating of the seamounts supports a hotspot origin only for the northwest–southeast trend, however. This hotspot has been named Euterpe hotspot after Euterpe, Greek Muse of musicians. Plate reconstructions for the time period based on the dates of the northwest–southeast trend and the older Line Islands are consistent with each other. The oldest is a sample from one of the Northwest cluster at 98.1 Ma

It is possible that their formation was influenced by the nearby presence of a spreading ridge, a process which has been suggested for other hotspots such as Réunion, Iceland, Azores and others as well. The Pacific-Farallon Ridge was located east of the Musicians Seamounts and flow from the hotspot to the ridge may have generated the east–west trending VERs of the Musicians Seamounts. This process is similar to that that formed the Wolf-Darwin linement extending from the present Galápagos hotspot. Technically this could be explained in plate tectonics as a process of asthenosphere related flow allowing buoyant melt from the hotspot being channelled towards the active spreading center.

Alternative earlier explanations for the formation of the Musicians Seamounts is the presence of a former spreading ridge at their site, and crustal weaknesses associated with the so-called "bending line" in the region which was formed by a change in the motion of the Pacific plate.

=== Eruptive history ===
The Musicians Seamounts were active during the Late Cretaceous. Ages obtained on some seamounts range from 96 million years ago for one that is unnamed in the Northwest Cluster, to 47 million years ago. The ages include over 94 million years ago for Hammerstein, 91 million years ago for Mahler, 90 million years ago for Brahms, 86 million years ago for Rachmaninoff, 84 million years ago for Liszt, 83 million years ago for Khatchaturian and West Schumann, 82 million years ago for West Mendelssohn, 79 million years ago for East Mendelssohn, 75 million years ago for Bach Ridge and Haydn to 65 million years ago for Paumakua.

Based on considerations derived from plate tectonics, earlier volcanism could have occurred on the Farallon plate, which has been subducted in its entirely and its volcanoes have now vanished. No volcanism in the Musicians Seamounts post-dating about 70 million years ago was discovered at first; either volcanism ceased at that time or it continued on the Farallon plate again. The Euterpe hotspot is now extinct, (Note: If the hotspot was still active, it would be located at 10°S 124°W.) although an unusually shallow ocean region around 0°S 148°W may be a remnant of the Euterpe hotspot.

Some of the ridges in the Musicians Seamounts have much younger ages, 53 to 52 million years ago by argon-argon dating and continuing to 48 to 47 million years ago. This volcanism occurred at the time of major changes in the motion of the Pacific plate; stresses occurring within the plate may have reactivated the Musicians volcanoes and resulted in this late stage activity. One earthquake has been recorded in the province during historical time.

=== Geologic context ===
About 10,000 seamounts and islands are estimated to dot the floor of the Pacific Ocean, forming clusters and chains. The origin of chains of seamounts and islands is commonly explained with the hotspot hypothesis, which posits that as the crust migrates above a stationary hotspot volcanism forms these structures. A further hypothesis, which is known now to be an approximation, supposed that the hotspots, sourced from mantle plumes, are static with respect to each other and thus geologists can reconstruct the history of plate movement by analyzing the tracks traced on the crust by hotspots. Later tectonic therapy allows for mantle plume shifts.

The Pacific Ocean contains a number of seamount and island chains, some of which have been attributed to hotspots such as the Cobb hotspot, Caroline hotspot, Hawaiian hotspot, Marquesas hotspot, Tahiti hotspot, Pitcairn hotspot, Macdonald hotspot and Louisville hotspot. Not all of these hotspots are necessarily fed by a deep continuous mantle plume; some may be nourished by discrete batches of melting material that rise through the mantle. Other chains may be controlled by mantle flow towards a spreading ridge, which has been proposed for the Musicians chain, as mentioned in the earlier VER discussion.

The lithosphere that the Musicians seamounts formed on is known from magnetic data to be between 121.4 and 83.65 million years old (Cretaceous normal superchron, C34n) except for the easternmost tip of the southern VERs which is C33r so is somewhere between 83.65 and about 79 million years old. It formed from ancient Pacific-Farallon plate spreading centers to the south-east of the Euterpe hotspot. Pacific plate motion was stable in its general north-west vector from the initial formation of the Northwest Cluster, and can be calculated to be 42 ± 9 km (26.1 ± 5.6 mi)/million years. This constrains the early change in Pacific plate rotation pole (where before this the local Pacific plate direction of movement was towards the west) to before 98 million years ago., The seamount alignment in the southern chain bends at about 81 million age and this correlates with the 79 million years ago bend in the northern Hawaiian–Emperor seamount chain, just north of the Detroit Seamount. After this the local vector direction of the Pacific plate was towards the north. Other evidence has suggested that the next change in Pacific plate rotation poles was between 54 and 47 million years ago which may have allowed extension volcanism in the southern part of the chain.

== Biology ==
Deep sea corals and sponges grow on the Musicians Seamounts; corals identified include Antipathes, Acanthogorgia, chrysogorgidae, Hemicorallium, isididae, Paracalyptrophora, Pleurogorgia and primnoids, while sponges include Caulophacus, Hyalostylus, Poliopogon and Saccocalyx. In some places true "coral forests" grow on the seamounts. Very high-density sessile cnidaria communities are found on Mussorgsky Seamount, Beethoven Ridge and Rapano Seamount at about 2,000 m (6,600 ft). On the Beethoven Ridge which is the deeper of these three at between 2,300 and 2,531 m (7,546 and 8,304 ft), the dominant species by far are anthomastus corals and the sponge density is also very high. Mussorgsky Seamount is predominantly a community of Narella (35%), Primnoidae (20%) and Keratosidinae (15%) while Mendelssohn Seamount has almost a 75% Keratosidinae deep sea coral predominance. Moderate sessile cnidaria density is present on Debussy Seamount, Paganini Seamount, Schumann Seamount, Mendelssohn Seamount, Wagner Seamount, Shostakovich Seamount and Sibelius Seamount. Lower density communities tend to be found at the deeper seamounts such as Mozart 3,571–3,849 m (11,716–12,628 ft) and Verdi 3,008–3,092 m (9,869–10,144 ft).

Animal species observed on the seamounts by remotely operated vehicles include amphipods, sea anemones, anglerfish, arrow worms, bristlemouths, brittle stars, cephalopods, chirons, codling fish, ctenophores, crinoids, cusk eels, fangtooth fish, halosaurs, jellyfish, larvaceans, piglet squid, polychaetes, ribbon worms, sea cucumbers, sea elephants, sea pens, sea spiders, sea stars, shrimp, siphonophores, spider crabs, squat lobsters, sea urchins and zoanthids.

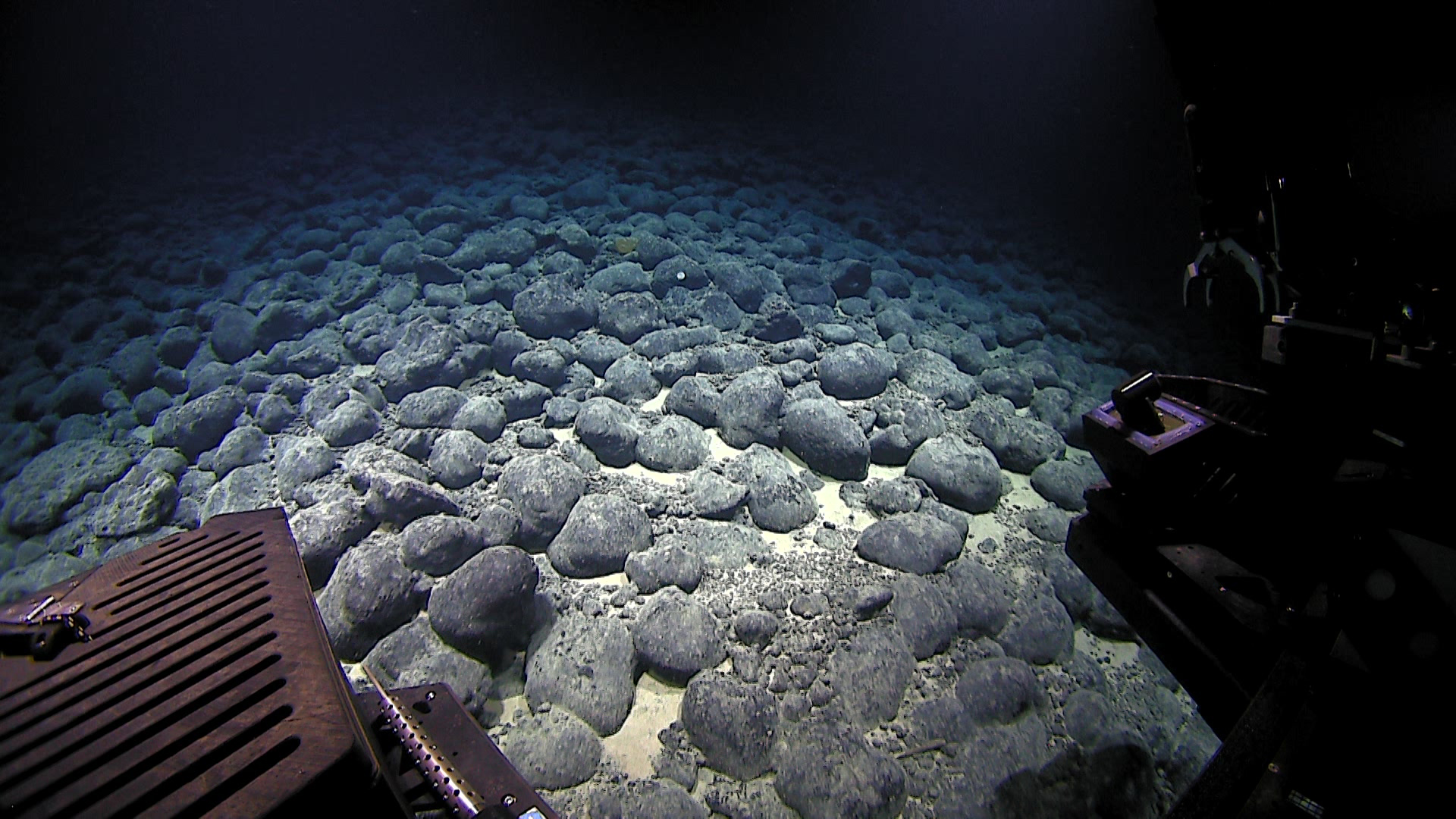
Pillow balls on Mozart Seamount

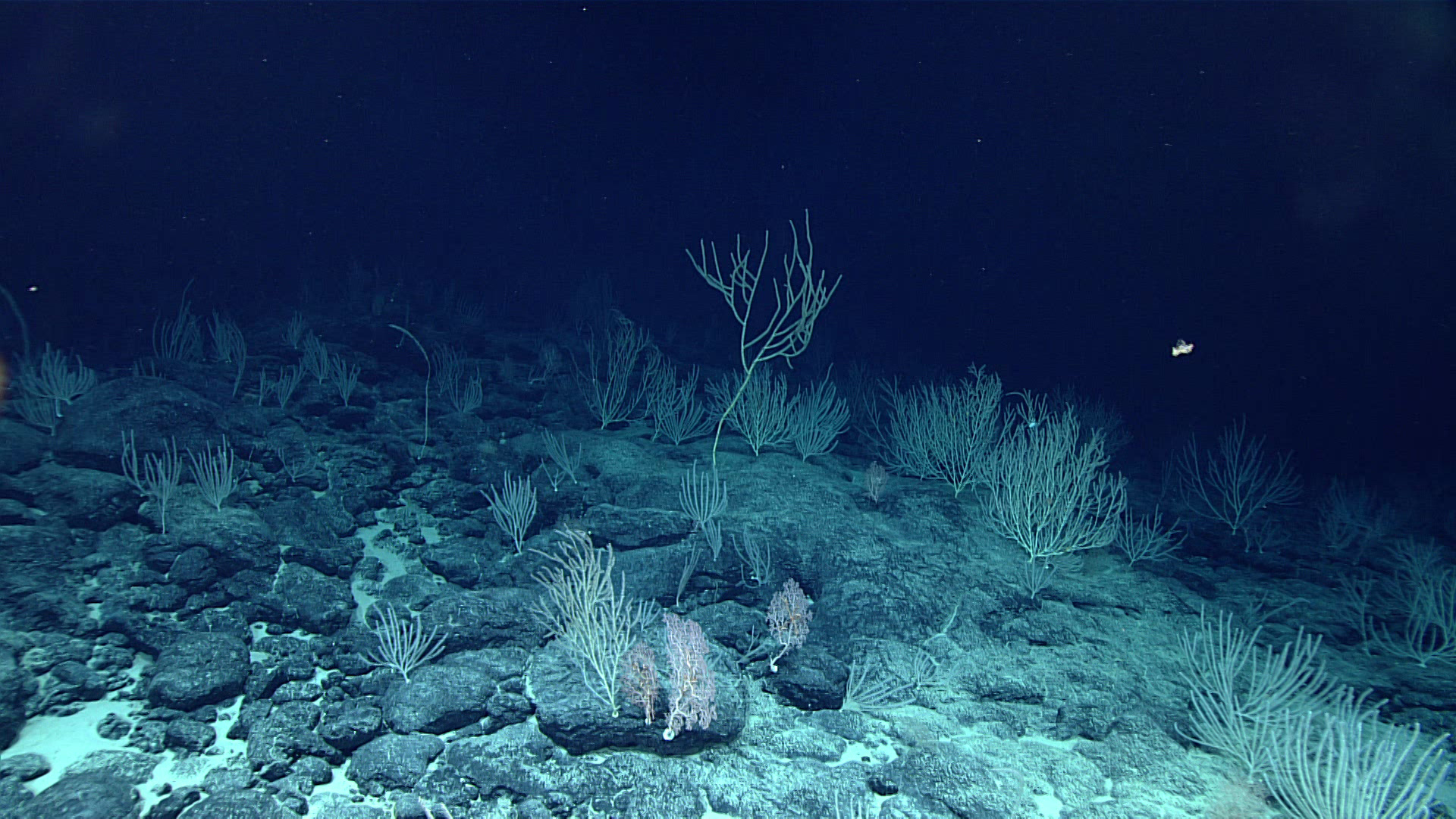
Corals on Mussorgsky Seamount

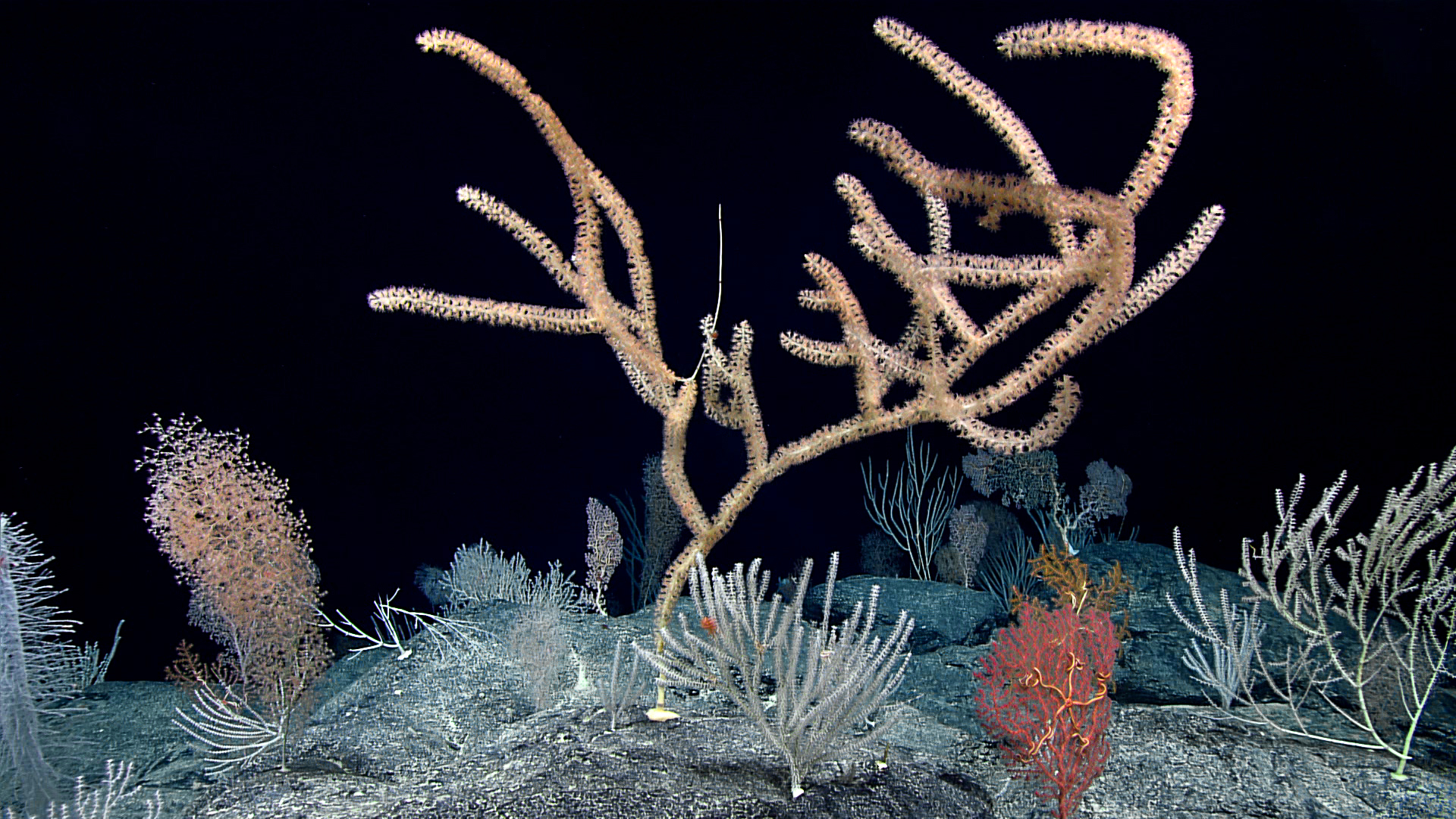
Corals on Debussy Seamount

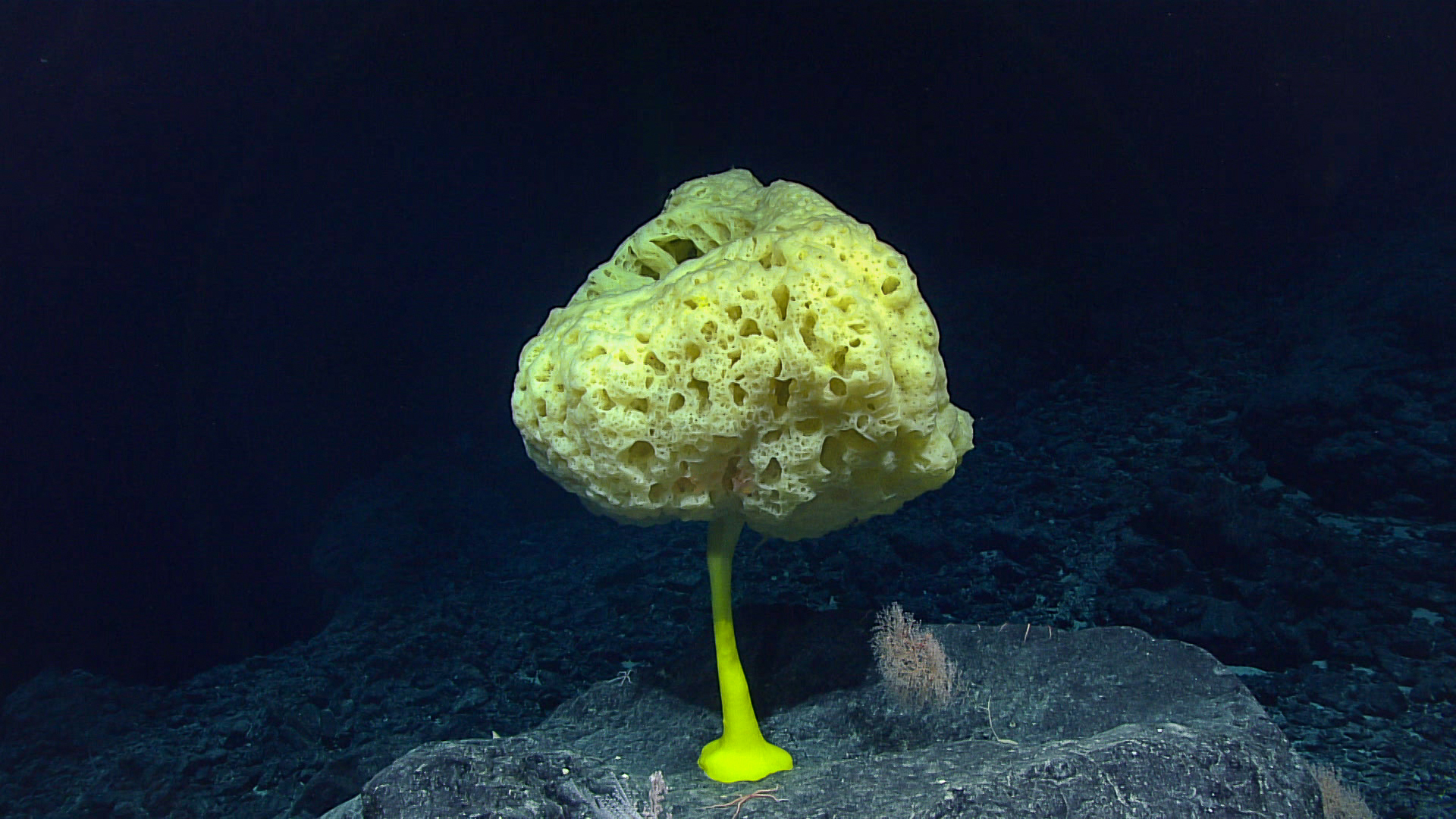
Bolosoma sp. on Sibelius Seamount

== See also ==
- Geologists Seamounts
