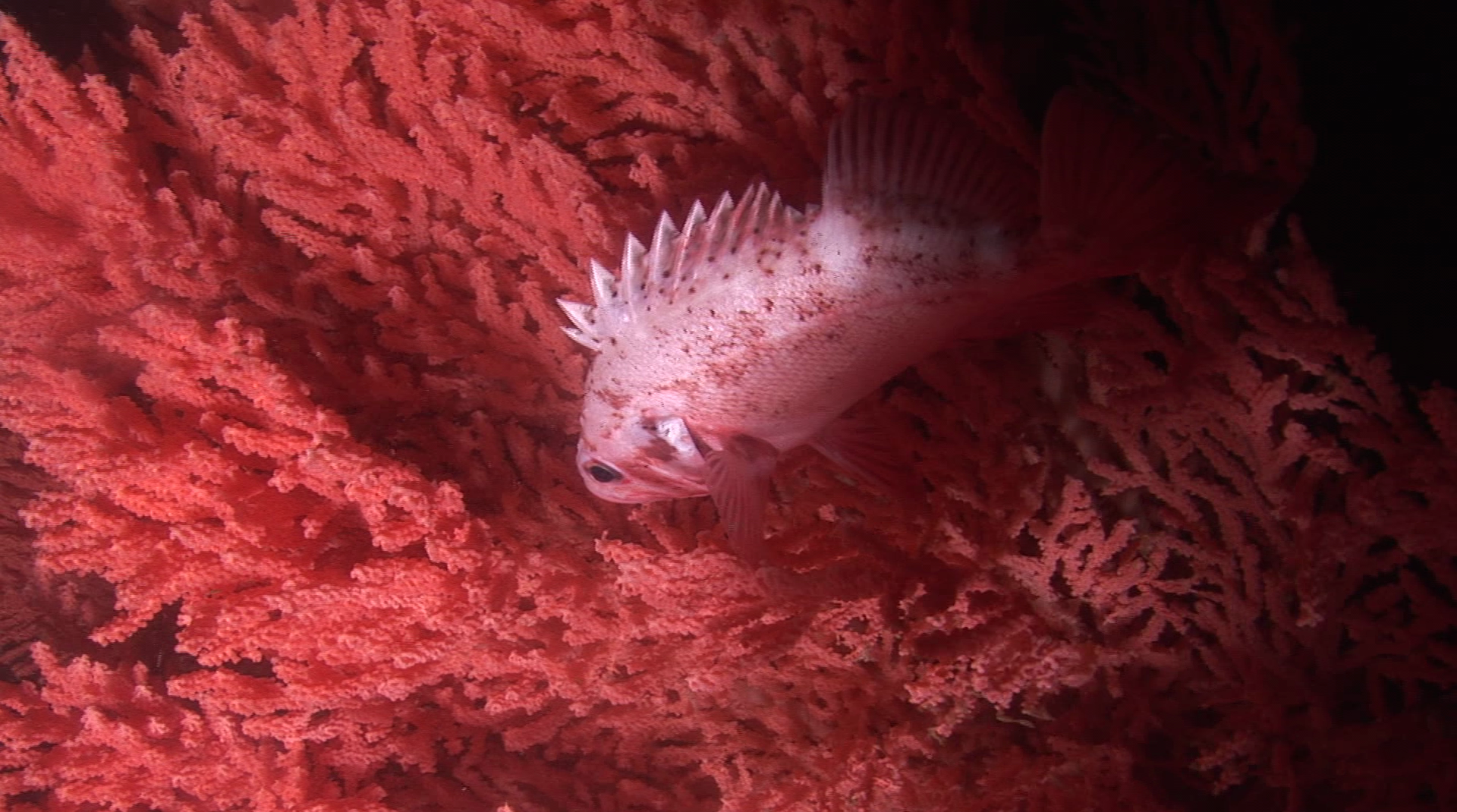
- Rockfish hiding in Primnoa pacifica in Haida Gwaii, British Columbia

Scientific classification
- Kingdom: Animalia
- Phylum: Cnidaria
- Subphylum: Anthozoa
- Class: Octocorallia
- Order: Scleralcyonacea
- Family: Primnoidae
- Genus: Primnoa
- Species: P. pacifica

Binomial name
- Primnoa pacifica Cairns & Bayer, 2005

= Primnoa pacifica =

Species of coral

Primnoa pacifica or red tree coral is a species of soft coral in the family Primnoidae. It is a deep water coral found in the North Pacific Ocean, and plays an integral role in supporting benthic ecosystems. Red tree corals grow axially and radially, producing structures of calcite and gorgonian skeletons that form dense thickets. Like other species of coral, red tree coral is made of a soluble form of calcium carbonate, which forms the reef structure, as well as provides food, shelter, and nutrients for surrounding organisms. Amongst the organisms red tree corals provide a home for, many are commercially important fish and crustaceans. These areas of marine habitat are listed as Habitat Areas of Particular Concern. However, anthropogenic impacts such as bottom trawling pose large-scale threats to these habitats. There are also concerns about the effects of ocean acidification on red tree coral, since it shares many of the same properties as other corals that are suffering from bleaching.

== Description ==
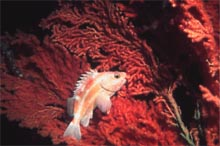
Yelloweye rockfish inhabiting red tree coral in Whale Bay, Alaska

=== Taxonomy ===
The family Primnoidae consists of soft corals that are mostly found in the deep sea. Due to the inaccessibility of sunlight below the photic zone, deep sea members of the Primnoidae family, such as Primnoa pacificia, do not have zooxanthellae symbionts. Primnoidae also lack the typical calcium carbonate skeleton that many shallow water corals possess, and many species of soft coral have no hard structural support at all. Other soft corals, such as those responsible for building seafloor habitats like Primnoa pacifica, contain a calcite and gorgonian skeletal structure, more flexible than calcium carbonate. Primnoa pacifica is different from other coral in its family because of its spinose basal scales. They also have narrower medial scales and large marginal scales, giving them a distinct shape.

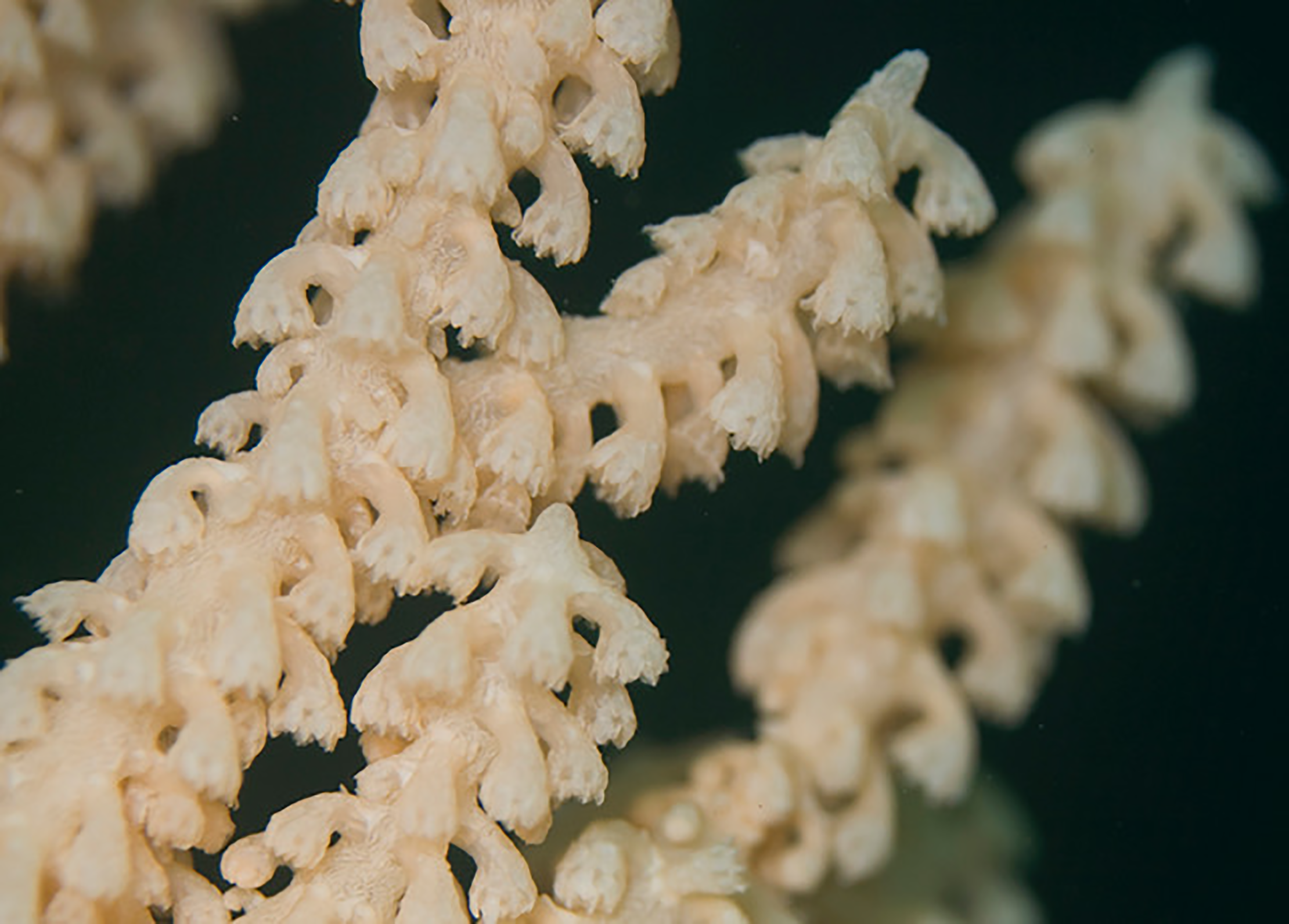
Close up of the structure of P. Pacifica

=== Anatomy ===
Like other corals, red tree corals also grow on hard substrates. The anatomy of a red tree coral consists of a holdfast base attached to a hard substrate, a bilaterally extending internal skeleton consisting of gorgonin and calcite, and polyp colonies covering the skeleton.

== Distribution and habitat ==
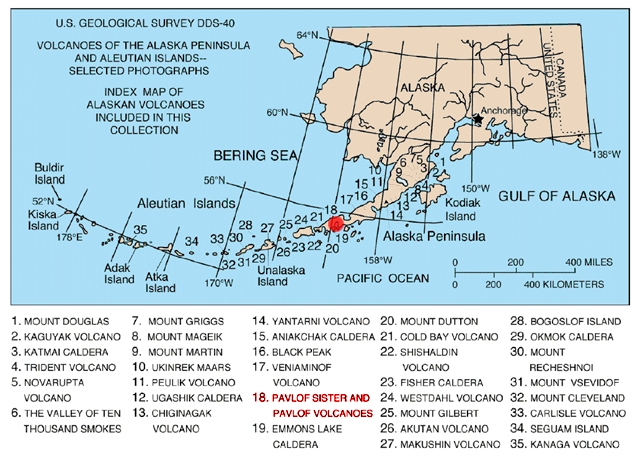
Map of the Alaskan coast where P. Pacifica are frequently found.

Primnoa pacifica is a deep water coral, some of which can survive at depths as great as 6 kilometers and temperatures as low as 30 °F. Primnoa pacifica is typically found along North Pacific outer continental shelves and inner continental slopes ranging in depths of 150 meters (490 ft) and 900 meters (3,000 ft). The coral is notably abundant off the coast of Alaska. In 2010, Primnoa pacifica was found in the unique habitat of the Tracy Arm fjord between 20 feet (6.1 m) and 100 feet (30 m) and in Alaskan waters, including under glaciers. A large population exists in British Columbia's Knight Inlet, where it occurs as shallow as 15 m deep on the crest of the sill that lies between Hoeya Head and Prominent Point. Since 2010, the coral was also discovered in other Pacific regions, including the waters surrounding Japan. Additionally, red tree corals prefer to attach to substrates made of mostly bedrock and prefer rougher seabeds to smooth.

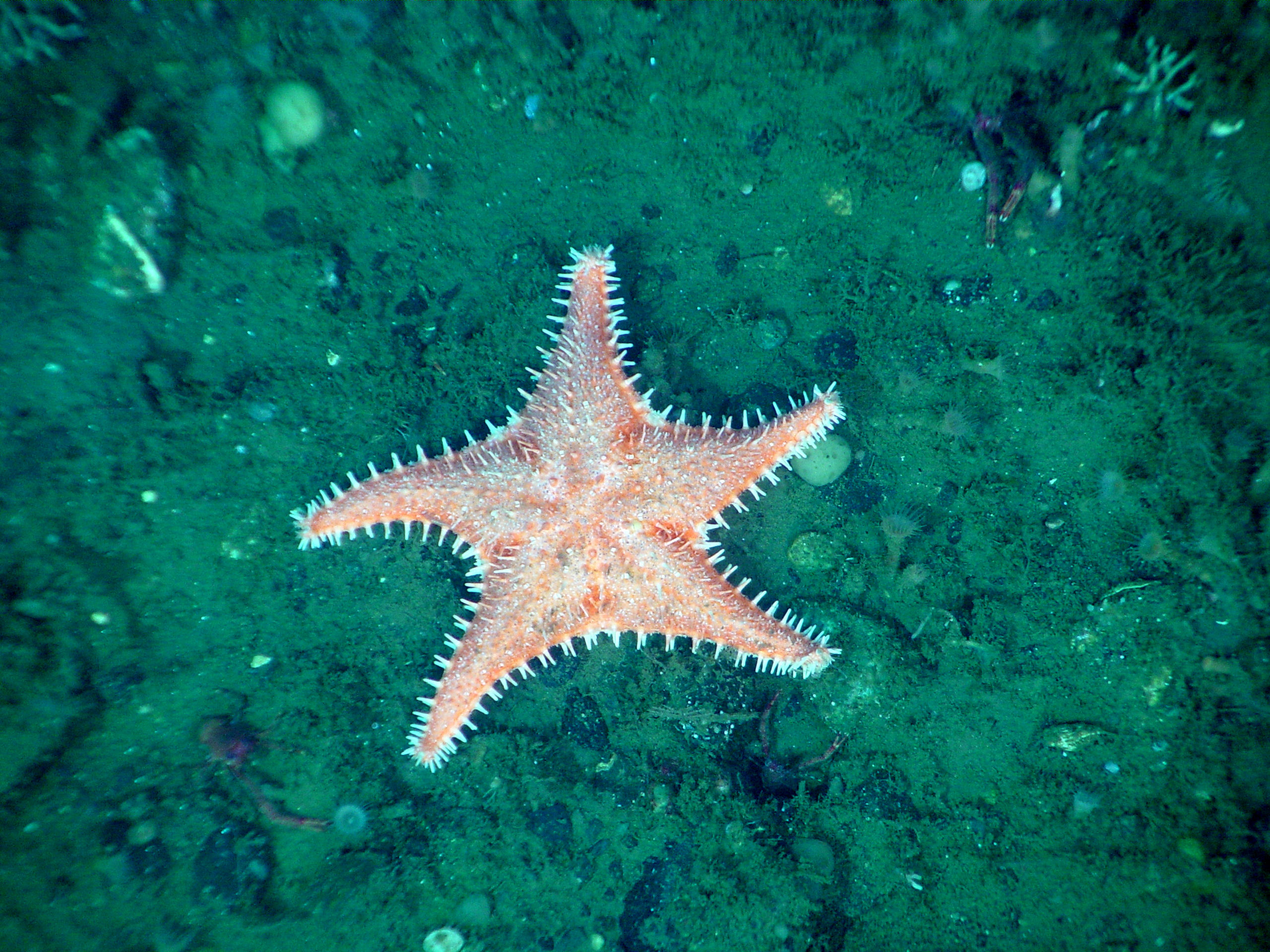
Spiny red sea star from Olympic Coast National Marine Sanctuary, common Primnoa pacifica predator

== Diet ==
Without photosynthetic symbionts to provide food and nutrients, red tree corals maintain a diet of mostly microscopic organisms and detritus.

== Predation ==
Red tree coral thickets are preyed on by the spiny Sea star Hippasteria phrygiana, the nudibranchs Tochuina gigantea and Tritonia tetraquetra and Calliostoma snails.

== Growth and reproduction ==
Red tree coral growth rate has yet to be well established. Past studies have shown that the radial growth rates are between .33 and .74 millimeters per year and axial growth rates between 2.41 and 6.39 centimeters per year. More recent studies, however, have shown radial growth of 0.14 to .57 millimeters per year and axial growth rates 1.60 to 2.32 centimeters per year. Red tree coral radial size has also been shown to correlate with age―massive corals exceeding the age of a century. An increase in red tree coral age is also linked with slowing growing rates. Unlike the more common hermaphroditic corals, Red tree corals are a gonochoric coral species with separate sexes, similar to other Primnoidae. The reproductive processes of red tree corals have not been studied extensively; however, they exhibit both the asexual reproductive strategy of budding as well as the sexual reproductive strategy of broadcast spawning. However, their sexual reproduction has been observed to occur asynchronously as the colonies lack mass spawning events. Brooding is also observed in red tree coral colonies.

== Environmental importance ==
=== Importance in ecosystem ===
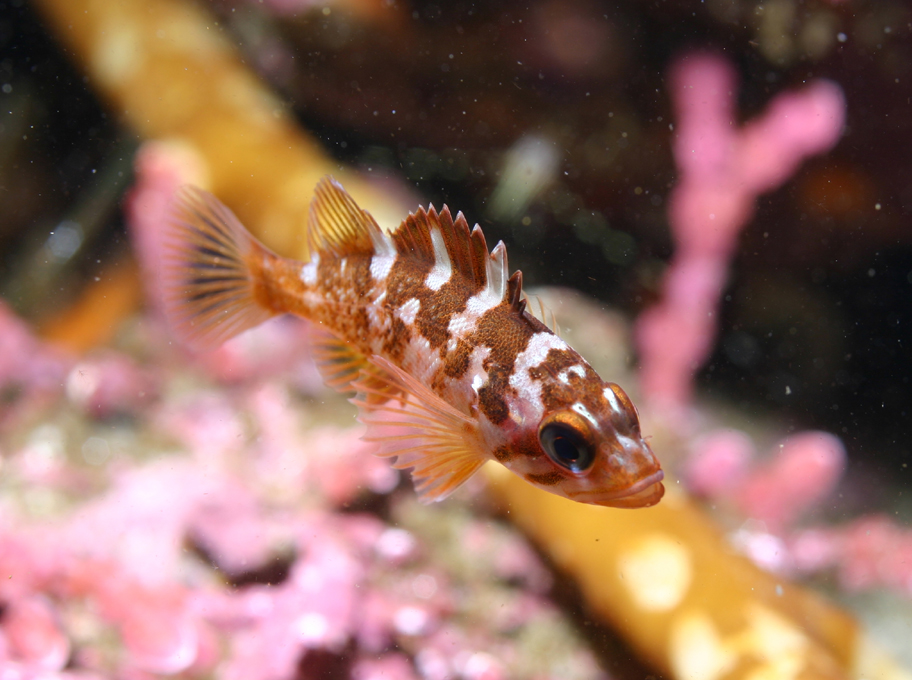
A juvenile rockfish may use P. Pacifica as a nursery ground

Primnoa Pacifica is a keystone species, so the ecosystem is dependent on this species and would go through significant changes if P. Pacifica was removed. This species is of particular interest in the marine environment because of the dense bottom thickets they form. Red tree corals grow their calcite and gorgonian skeletons axially and radially. These three dimensional structured thickets serve as main sources of habitat to bottom dwelling organisms in the many areas red tree corals populate such as the Gulf of Alaska. A multitude of fish and crab species depend on the thickets as breeding, feeding, and nursery grounds, including juvenile rockfish. The corals shelter them from predators and currents. However, the ecosystems of these habitats have their own intricate web of interactions that remain poorly understood.

Studies have shown that coral thickets in this area, coupled with sponge colonies, serve as a keystone species, their presence directly corresponding to biodiversity. The habitat that these deep sea corals provide serve as nursery grounds and refuge for a variety of fish taxon. In particular, rockfish are very strongly associated with red tree coral thickets. Red tree coral thickets are unmatched in density and size throughout the ocean. However, the massive thickets are also relatively rare. Therefore, primnoa pacifica prove to be crucial to the ecosystems they support, but only to a number of communities.

=== Relationship with humans ===
Anthropogenic impacts such as bottom trawling pose large-scale threats to these rare benthic habitats. Commercial deep sea trawling and fishing cause major disturbances to red tree coral habitats. Trawl nets and fishing hooks can easily damage or uproot the delicate red tree coral's gorgonian skeleton, effectively killing large amounts of the coral. The red tree coral's large size and tangle of tree-like branches make it especially susceptible to human-caused damage. After a disturbance event, red tree corals will not return to their original state for tens to hundreds of years. In an effort to conserve the coral population, once a location of these deep sea oases is established, legislation protects the habitats by prohibiting bottom commercial activity in the surrounding waters. Rising global temperatures and oil spills also threaten red tree coral populations.
