= Primnoa wingi =

Scientific classification
- Kingdom: Animalia
- Phylum: Cnidaria
- Subphylum: Anthozoa
- Class: Octocorallia
- Order: Scleralcyonacea
- Family: Primnoidae
- Genus: Primnoa
- Species: P. wingi

Binomial name
- Primnoa wingi Cairns & Bayer, 2005

Species of coral

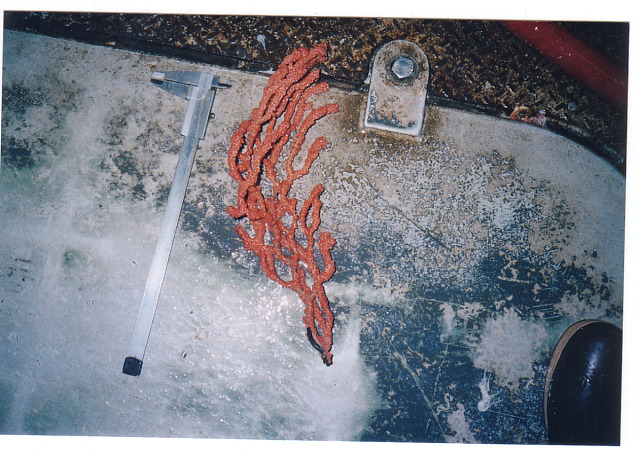
Retrieved Primnoa wingi

Primnoa wingi is a species of soft coral in the family Primnoidae.
