= Callogorgia elegans =

Scientific classification
- Kingdom: Animalia
- Phylum: Cnidaria
- Subphylum: Anthozoa
- Class: Octocorallia
- Order: Scleralcyonacea
- Family: Primnoidae
- Genus: Callogorgia
- Species: C. elegans

Binomial name
- Callogorgia elegans (Gray, 1870)

Synonyms
- Callicella elegans Gray, 1870

Species of coral

Callogorgia elegans is a species of soft corals in the family Primnoidae. It is found in the north-western Pacific Ocean. Like other coral species, C. elegans is bottom-dwelling and sessile, or immobile.

== Phylogeny and evolutionary history ==
Callogorgia elegans, like all species of coral, belongs to the phylum Cnidaria. Along with corals, the phylum Cnidaria contains other animals commonly known as anemones, jellyfishes, and more. C. elegans belongs to one of the four major classes of within the phylum Cnidaria, known as Anthozoa, and is further sorted into the subclass Octocorallia. The class Anthozoa includes anemones, stony corals, and soft corals and is characterized by almost always being attached to the seabed. The subclass Octocorallia identifies marine organisms with 8-fold symmetry. C. elegans is also sorted into the family Primnoidae, which is classified mainly by its formation of colonies and branches, dichotomous arrangement of polyps, and sclerite form and number. This species was previously and incorrectly sorted into the genus Callicella before being transferred to the genus Callogorgia in 1878.

== Defining features ==
C. elegans, like all members of the genus Callogorgia, has the following defining characteristics. The species, like other Cnidarians, have two tissue layers, the entoderm and ectoderm, separated by the mesoglea. Species with two tissue layers are known as diploblastic. C. elegans has a colonial growth form specific to corals in the genus Callogorgia, a dichotomous growth form, which branches off in opposite directions. C. elegans have 0.78-0.93 millimeter polyps that face upwards, forming whorls with a diameter of 2.8-3.5 millimeters on branches. Each whorl contains four polyps and branches have 9 polyps per centimeter. C. elegans has a tessellate sclerite pattern that decrease from abaxial (facing away from the stem) to adaxial (facing toward the stem) polyp side, with a thick polygonal scale shape, measuring up to 0.12 millimeters in thickness. The adaxial surface is typically protected by polyps that bend inward while the abaxial surface is more prone to attacks from predators. Numerous tubercules cover the central inner surface of the species' scales, anchoring them in the mesoglea, found between the entoderm and ectoderm.

== Distribution ==
The genus Callogorgia is typically found in tropical as well as warm temperate regions that include both the North Pacific and West Atlantic Oceans, although these species can live in all oceans around the globe. Species that belong to the genus Callogorgia are primnoid corals found in the deep-sea and are known to form habitats. C. elegans is found at benthic (bottom) levels within the depths of 280-480 meters from the southern area of the Hawaii-Emperor seamount chain in the North Pacific Ocean.

== Feeding and reproduction ==
C. elegans, like all cnidarians, possess cnidae, or nematocysts, which are used for both capturing prey and for defense. Nematocysts are characterized as capsules that contain a sticky thread armed with spines or toxins that are ejected on contact. Like other anthozoans, C. elegans use these nematocysts to capture prey, which typically include the algae that reside on their polyps and the fish that hide from larger predators within the branches of the coral. C. elegans is a sessile, or immobile species, like other corals, making it an ideal place for these small fish to hide.

Reproduction in the genus Callogorgia has yet to be studied, although species in the family Primnoidae have been known for coral spawning where gametes are released into the water and eventually settle at the ocean floor.
