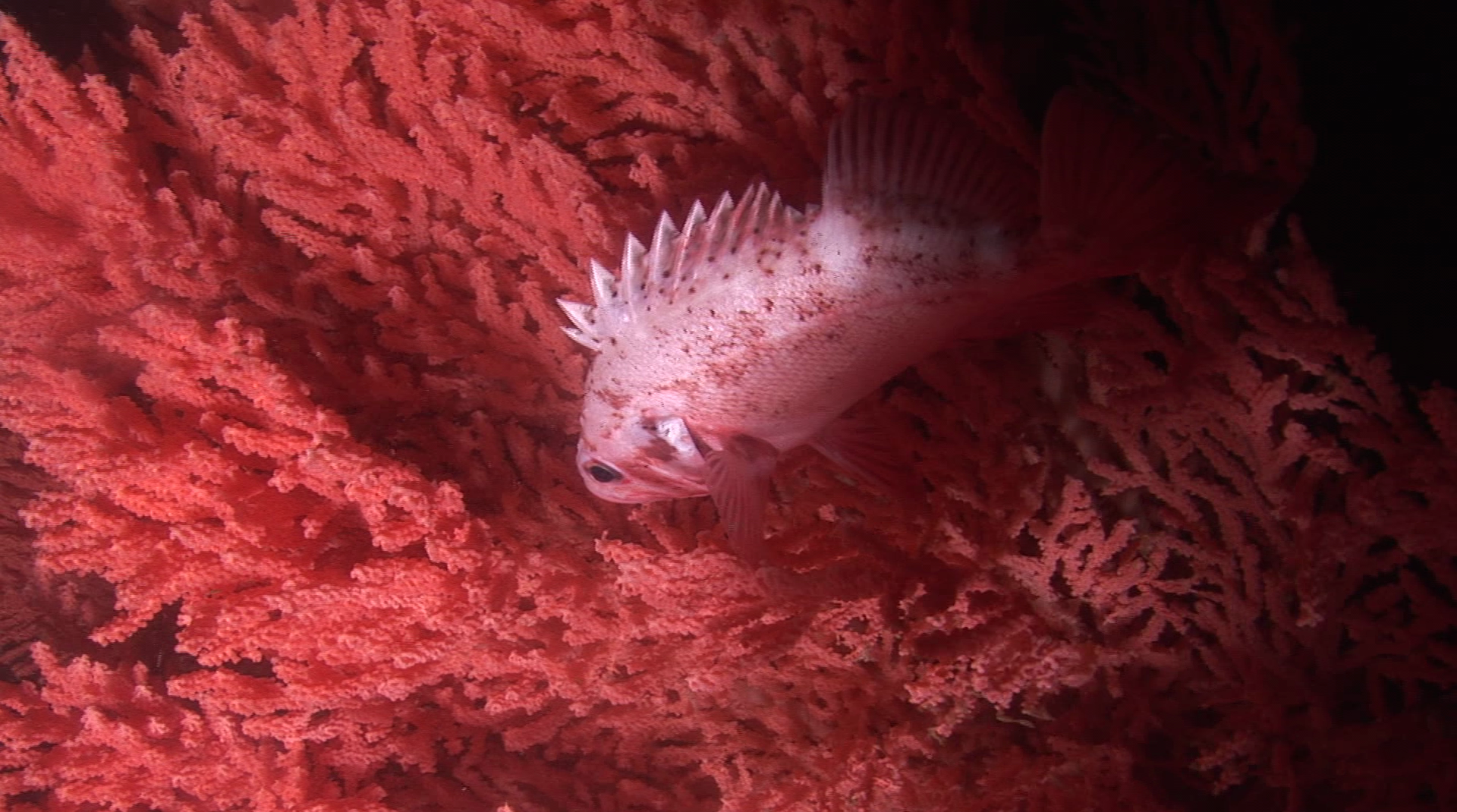

Scientific classification
- Kingdom: Animalia
- Phylum: Cnidaria
- Subphylum: Anthozoa
- Class: Octocorallia
- Order: Scleralcyonacea
- Family: Primnoidae
- Genus: Primnoa; Lamouroux, 1812

Species
- Primnoa bisquama; †Primnoa costata; Primnoa notialis; Primnoa pacifica; Primnoa resedaeformis; Primnoa wingi

= Primnoa =

Primnoa Temporal range: Early Paleocene–Recent

Genus of corals

Primnoa (Lamororux, 1812) also known as red tree coral, is a genus of soft corals and the type genus of the family Primnoidae (Milne Edwards, 1857). They are sessile, benthic cnidarians that can be found in the North Pacific, North Atlantic, and Subantarctic South Pacific, and its members often play a vital ecological role as keystone species within their environment as a habitat and refuge for the megafauna that also inhabit those regions. This, in combination with their slow growth, makes the increasing disturbance to their habitats caused by fishing activities particularly impactful and difficult to recover from.

== Etymology ==
The name Primnoa derives from the Greek word Πρυμνὼ (Prymno), the name of an Oceanid. The name itself is derived from πρυμνός (prymnos), meaning "last", "lowest", and by extension, "deepest".

== Taxonomy ==
The genus Primnoa was first described by Jean Vincent Félix Lamouroux in 1812. In the 19th and 20th century, several more species were proposed as members of Primnoa, but most were originally described as members of other genera within Primnoidae. Currently there are only five valid species and one variety that are recognized members of the genus. Their details are tabulated below:

Species	Details	Image
P. bisquama (Taylor & Rogers, 2017)	Found in the Southwest Indian Ocean. Light pink in color. Its most distinguishing feature is its low-rise operculum, fewer number of large body-wall scales, and infrequent, relatively smaller polyps	P. bisquama (on the left)
P. notialis (Cairns & Bayer, 2005)	Found in the Subantarctic South Pacific Ocean At depths of 549-915m. Its most distinguishing feature is the variation in the number of body-wall scales, which are occasionally in excess.	P. notialis
P. pacifica (Kinoshita, 1907)	P. pacifica typical is found in the Sea of Japan, the Sea of Okhotsk, the Aleutian Islands, the Bering Sea, and the northeast Pacific coast from Alaska to La Jolla, California, at 9-800 m. It is pink in color and its most distinguishing features are its massive basal body-wall scales, as well as the presence of a margina spine similar to those found in Narella.	P. pacifica typical
P. pacifica (Kinoshita, 1907)	P. pacifica var willeyi is found in the Aleutian Islands to British Columbia at depths of 183-755 m. It differs from the typical form in that is orange in color and has more slender polyps.	P. pacifica var willeyi
P. resedaeformis (Gunnerus, 1763)	Found in the North Atlantic from Virginia Beach to Greenland at 91-548 m. Found in the Eastern Atlantic from Greenland to Scotland at 95-1,020 m. It is bright pink in color. Its most distinguishing feature are its rectangular basal body-wall scales.	P. resedaeformis
P. wingi (Cairns & Bayer, 2005)	Found in the Aleutian Islands and the Bering Sea at 110-914 m, and is pink in color. Its most distinguishing feature are its inconspicuous body-wall scales, as well as its uniquely shaped opercular scales.	P. wingi

== Anatomy and physiology ==
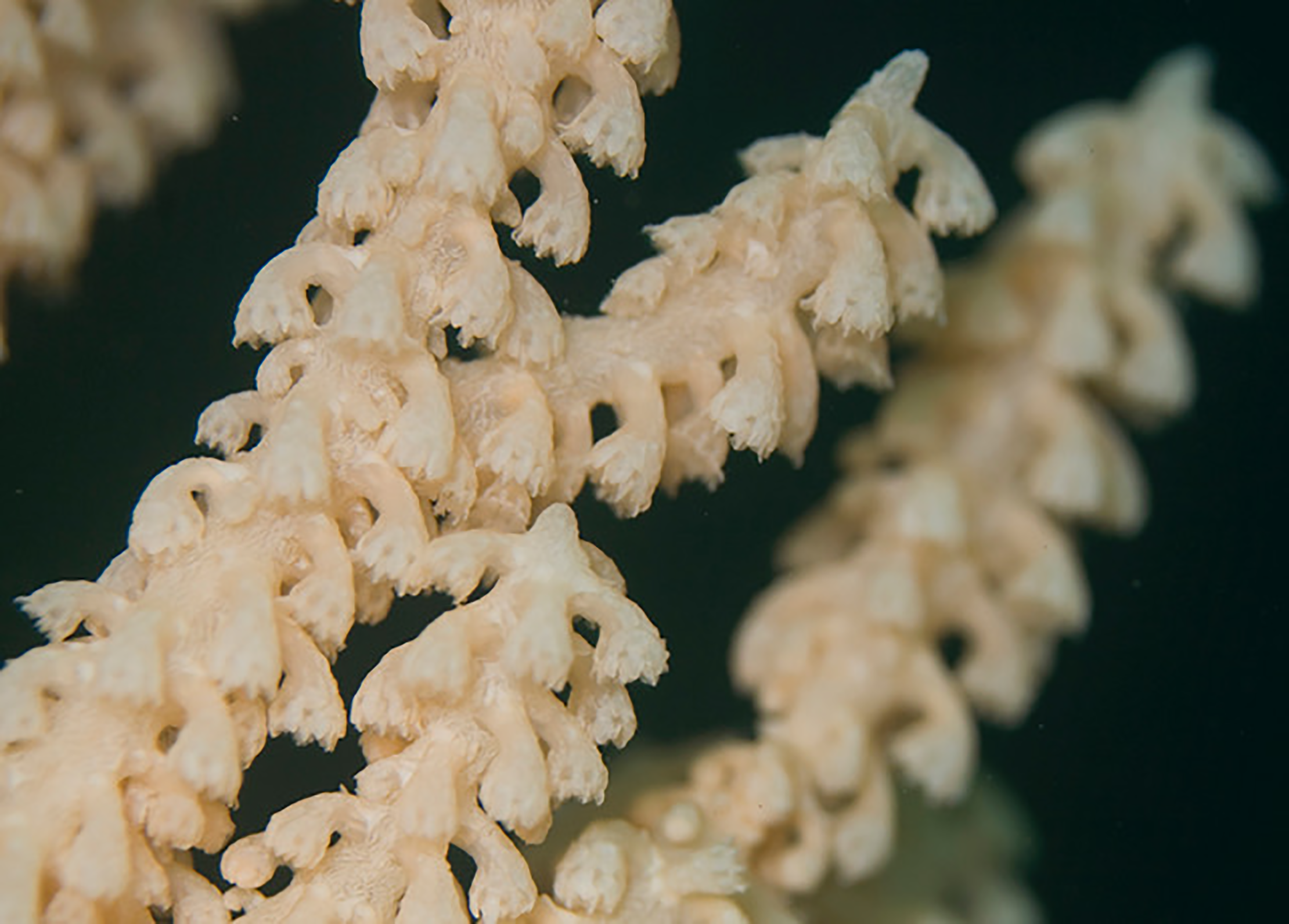
Close up view of P. pacifica polyps

Primnoa colonies are typically bushy in shape, heavily branched with no immediately visible main stem, though they do possess one. They also dichotomously branch, meaning that they separate into two equally sized branches at every branching point. They have large polyps that are non-retractile which are protected by a polyp composed of six overlapping rows of calcitic scales, with adaxial (stem-facing) scales tending to be smaller than their outward facing counterparts, or absent altogether. Polyps are individually distinct, usually appressed and downward facing, but otherwise randomly arranged and close together. Due to their predatory nature, most have small, thorny tentacles, and a well-developed operculum at the tip of the polyp. Primnoa are monomorphic, thus only having one type of polyp. Their internal anatomy is consistent with that of other gorgonian corals. The physical differences between species in this genus primarily derive from variances in body scale shape and number. Species in these genus have colors that range from pink to reddish-orange.

They are also ahermatypic, which means they aren't reef building corals, but they still form large structures and are found in abundance in clusters of colonies. Like many other octocorals, rather than using calcium carbonate in the form of aragonite (which is used by Scleractinian corals), Primnoa use a more stable form called calcite, which is less soluble in seawater. They anchor themselves to hard substrates using calcareous discoid holdfasts, which are then further supported by growing layers of calcite at the base of the colony.

== Behaviour and life history ==
=== Reproduction ===
Not much is known about the reproduction of Primnoa species. So far, it has been established that Primnoa are gonochoristic corals, meaning that each colony is either male or female. Reproduction occurs via broadcast spawning, which results in the organisms externally fertilizing their eggs. Unlike most corals which use this method, there is no evidence of reproductive periodicity or synchronized mass spawning events.

=== Feeding ===
Like many other deep-water corals, Primnoa are azooxanthellate, meaning that they do not have symbiotic relationships with Symbiodinium. Instead, they received nutrition via filter-feeding and obtain food directly from the water column. Studies suggest that Primnoa are primarily carnivorous, feeding on sinking particulate organic matter and zooplankton. The possibility of them eating resuspended meiofauna has also been proposed, given their downward facing polyps.

=== Ecology ===
Many species of Primnoa are considered ecologically important, acting as keystone species, foundation species, and ecological engineers because their complex branching and large size allow them to serve as a habitat by providing shelter and substrate for many animals.

Some species of suspension feeders use the branches of Primnoa to obtain nutrients, by elevating their position in the water and collecting floating particles that circulate the water column,. These species include various crinoids, basket stars, anemones, and sponges. Suspension feeders have been reported in association with Primnoa at depths greater than 300 m.

Species also seek shelter and protection using the branches of Primnoa to hide them from predators. These species include types of crabs, shrimps, and rockfish. Shrimp are observed to be hiding among the polyps of the corals, while crabs were found beneath them. Rockfish were found both beneath and among the polyps. In some circumstances, species were found to be using the protection of the coral polyps for reproductive purposes, as they were well hidden from predators among the coral's branches.

=== Predation ===
Predators of the Primnoa include sea stars, nudibranchs, and snails, though sea stars are their primary predators. One study found that sea stars were responsible for 45-34% of the consumption of the soft coral polyps.

== Distribution and habitat ==
Primnoa require hard substrate they can firmly attach to, such as rocky outcrops or boulders. These hard substrates allow them to live in areas with strong currents, a preference which increases their odds of capturing food due to the higher velocity and volume of water passing through their branches.

Despite being characterized as deep water corals, Primnoa can also be found in shallow water habitats. The total bathymetric range occupied by the genus is between 6-1,020 m. However, Primnoa being present in these shallow regions is due to a phenomenon known as deep-sea emergence, which is defined as "a phenomenon whereby organisms that typically dwell in the deep sea are able to exist in shallow-water areas because of unusual oceanographic conditions there." In this case, retreating glaciers have resulted in exposed bedrock and very cool temperatures that are similar to the deep-water temperatures preferred by Primnoa, as well as other factors that help mimic their natural environment. Additionally, one study observed how some coral grew in atypical forms due to poor health, causing them to become ecomorphs due to the stress of living in unfavorable conditions such as turbidity and periods of increased water temperature higher than they could tolerate.

=== The Aleutian Islands ===
The Aleutian Islands are an island chain off the coast of Alaska, in the North Pacific. They range approximately 6,821 square miles, and are made up of around 300 islands, including 14 larger volcanic islands. The waters are cold and nutrient rich due to the active margins they inhabit, and experience large amounts of upwelling from the seafloor.

The benthic environments in which Primnoa are found provide the capacity for unique and highly diverse sponges and soft corals. These organisms in turn provide the basis for a habitat to many vertebrate species such as fish. This region is home to the most productive fisheries of the Northern Pacific due to the benthic abundance and its capacity to support vertebrate species. In general, corals are most abundant at depths between 100 and 200 m, but can be found anywhere from 27 to 363 m down.

19 species of corals known in the Aleutian Islands belong to the Primnoidae family, and 25 of the 69 documented species of corals in the Aleutian Isles, including P. wingi are endemic species. Meaning they are restricted to the geographical range that spans the Aleutian Islands; however this diversity begins to increase west of 169°W. It is believed by some scientists that the Aleutian Islands serve as the evolutionary cradle for some taxa of cold water soft corals, due to the sheer diversity and abundance of the organisms that the waters display.

== Threats and conservation measures ==
=== Fishing methods ===
The largest risk for this family of corals comes from fisheries and net trawling, which uproots the corals and destroys them. Sometimes, the corals are worn by natives as jewelry, as they are bycatch of the fishing hawks and do not have other nutritive or practical uses. Nearly 39% of the seafloor of the Aleutian Islands shows disturbance due to bottom-contact fishing tools and gear such as nets. Because of their vital interactions with megafauna in these ecosystems, fisheries must integrate coral conservation into their practices, or otherwise risk disturbance to their entire industry.
