= Ascolepis =

Ascolepis may refer to:

- Ascolepis, a genus of corals in the family Acanthogorgiidae, synonym of Fannyella
- Ascolepis, a genus of plants in the family Cyperaceae, synonym of Cyperus
