= Parastenella =

Parastenella may refer to:

- Parastenella (coral), a genus of corals in the family Primnoidae
- Parastenella (fungus), a genus of funguses in the division Ascomycota, family unassigned
