= Geologists Seamounts =

Group of seamounts in the Pacific Ocean mainly south of Hawaii

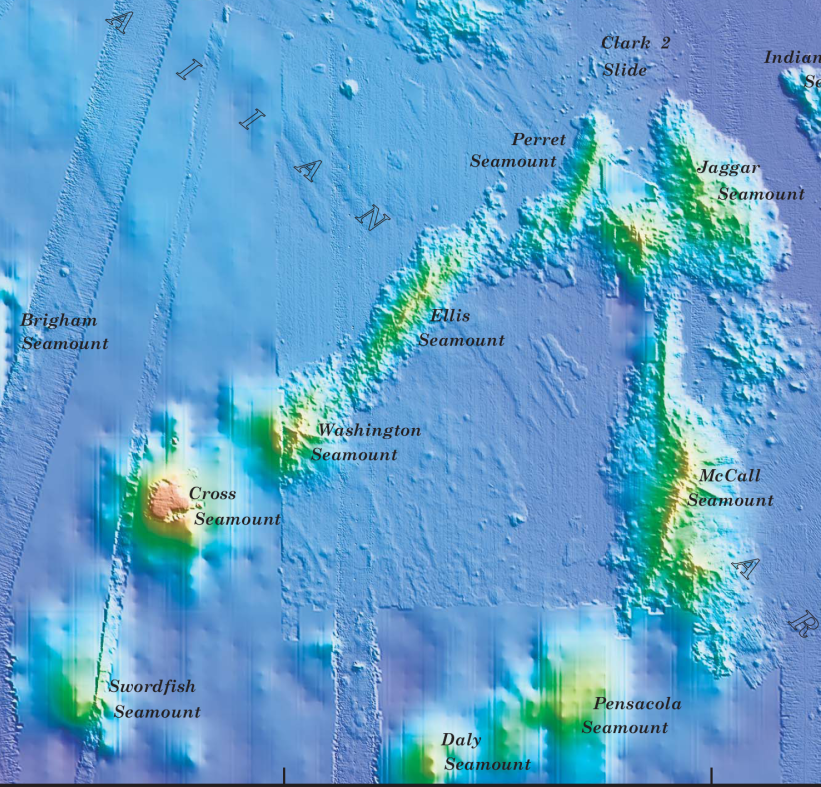
- Bathymetric map of the south-west Geologists Seamounts

- Location within Pacific Ocean

Location
- Location: North Pacific Ocean
- Coordinates: 18°40′N 157°40′W

Geology
- Age of rock: Cretaceous

Geologists Seamounts (alternatively were named South West Hawaii Group) are a cluster of seamounts in the Pacific Ocean, located mainly 100 miles (160 km) south of Oahu, Hawaii and 100–200 kilometres (62–124 mi) south-west from Big Island (Hawaiʻi). Clockwise from north they are named Perret, Jaggar, McCall, Pensacola, Daly, Swordfish, Cross, Washington and Ellis. The Kauluakalana seamount to the north of Oahu on the far side of the Hawaiian chain to the other seamounts of the cluster, and south-east of the Musicians Seamounts has reason to be regarded as part of the Geologists Seamounts, but would not so be grouped logically by the former name for the cluster.

== Geology ==
The mountains have a height above seafloor of about 5 kilometres (3.1 mi). They developed on a mid-ocean ridge during the Cretaceous, about 80 million years ago, and there is no geological relationship to the neighbouring Hawaiian Islands. There is about contemporaneous timing with the formation of the Musicians Seamounts to the north-west of Oahu and Hawaiʻi, from the limited sampling and analysis to date. Ages that have been obtained include 80.5 Ma for Kauluakalana, 84.5 Ma for Cross and 82.7 Ma for McCall. Rocks dredged from the seamounts include iron-manganese crusts, carbonates and basalts.

== Ecology ==
Corals and sponges have been recorded at the south-western Swordfish Seamount at a depth of 1,071 m (3,514 ft) with plexauridae, alcyonacea, and coralliidae corals. The deeper coral community on Ellis Seamount at a depth of 2,135 m (7,005 ft) was less diverse with bamboo corals dominant, but coverage is still widespread.
