= Primnoeides =

Scientific classification
- Kingdom: Animalia
- Phylum: Cnidaria
- Subphylum: Anthozoa
- Class: Octocorallia
- Order: Scleralcyonacea
- Family: Primnoidae
- Genus: Primnoeides; Studer & Wright, 1887

Genus of corals

Primnoeides is a genus of Cnidaria in the family Primnoidae.

== Species ==
- Primnoeides brochi Zapata-Guardiola & López-González, 2010
- Primnoeides flagellum Taylor & Rogers, 2017
- Primnoeides kuekenthali (Zapata-Guardiola & López-González, 2010)
- Primnoeides sertularoides Wright & Studer, 1889
