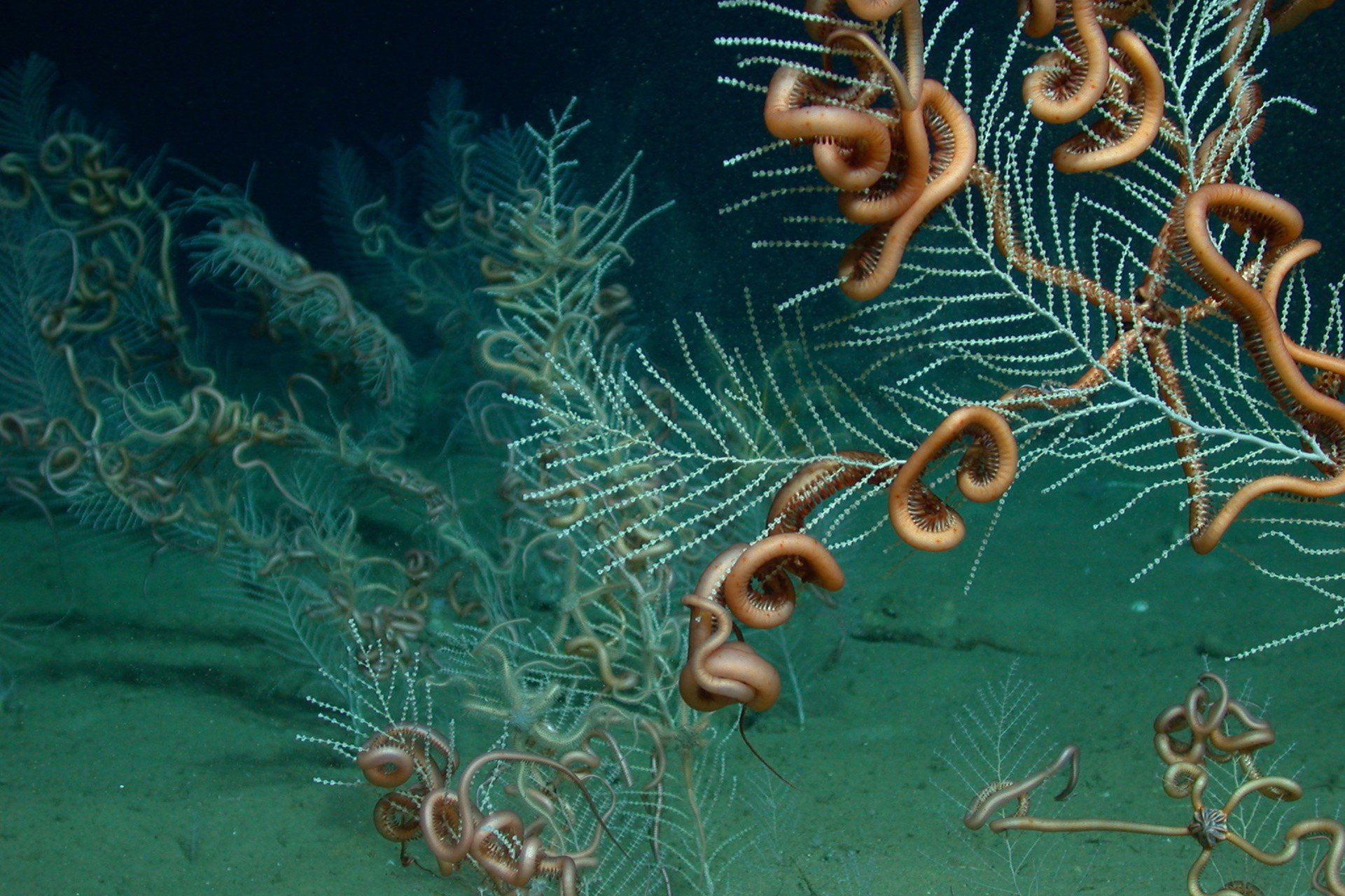
- A field of the soft coral Callogorgia sp. with its ophiuroid symbiont

Scientific classification
- Kingdom: Animalia
- Phylum: Cnidaria
- Subphylum: Anthozoa
- Class: Octocorallia
- Order: Scleralcyonacea
- Family: Primnoidae
- Genus: Callogorgia; Gray, 1858

Species
- See text

Synonyms
- Callicella Gray, 1870; Xiphocella Gray, 1870; Caligorgia Wright & Studer, 1889

= Callogorgia =

Genus of corals

Callogorgia is a genus of deep sea corals that are ideally suited to be habitats for different organisms. They reproduce both sexually and asexually, clinging to the hard substrate of the ocean during their maturation process. Callogorgia are found at depths ranging from 750-8200 feet in the Gulf of Mexico, Pacific Ocean and the Caribbean Sea. An array of organisms have relationships with Callogorgia, including brittle stars, cat sharks, and copepods. The nature of these relationships are often commensal, with Callogorgia providing a habitat for the organisms.

== Description ==
Callogorgia is a genus of soft corals in the family Primnoidae. Callogorgia exhibit a fan shaped body structure that often serves as a habitat for other organisms. Callogorgia are a relatively recently researched genus, with most studies occurring in the last 40 years. Due to the recency of the research on this genus, species are still being discovered and researched.

== Life cycle ==
Callogorgia can reproduce both sexually and asexually. Mature eggs enter the body cavity and spawned via the mouth. A planktonic disc-shaped larva grows from the fertilized egg. The early growth of tentacles, body cavity, and mouth begins their change into adults. Callogorgia cling to a surface in the water as they mature into adults.

== Habitat ==
Callogorgia can be found in upper bathyal region of the sea between 750–8200 feet deep. Callogorgia inhabit parts of the ocean across the world, from the Atlantic to the Indo-Pacific. The species Callogorgia veriticillata is found in the Mediterranean Sea, while other species such as C. americana are found in the Atlantic. They can reside in brackish water as well, areas with less salinity than true marine environments. Each species of Callogorgia will bunch together in dense colonies, inhabiting a unique site of ecological parameters. They are often found with brittle stars attached to their branches.

== Relationships ==
The variety of colonies in Callogorgia species makes them an ideal habitat for certain brittle stars. The brittle stars have a commensal relationship with the octocorals, with the ophiurans benefitting by the elevation provided by Callogorgia, allowing them to suspension feed. The genus Callogorgia Gray is known for its propensity to form habitats for fauna in the Pacific Ocean and Gulf of Mexico. In experiments carried out in Eastern Tropical Pacific, the octocoral Callogorgia cf. galapagensis Cairns was found with specimens of the Astrodia cf. excavata ophiuroid. In the Caribbean Sea, Callogorgia gracilis was found with ophiuroids from the genera Asteroschema and Ophiomitra.

Cat sharks use Callogorgia as a nursery habitat by depositing their egg cases on the branches of the coral. Callogorgia has also formed associations with copepods, zoanthids, and scale worms. A zoanthid, Isozoanthus primnoidus, was found to exhibit a parasitic relationship by benefitting from the support of the coral and its sclerites for protection, while consuming the coral's tissue.

Threats to Callogorgia include damage from fishing gear and equipment as they trawl the floor of the ocean, which can change the environment the corals grow in. They are also highly sensitive to climate change and ocean acidification which can hinder the growth of Callogorgia. Due to being a coral, they grow very slowly, therefore, any change affecting their rate of growth has profound effects and can linger for decades.

== Species ==
- Callogorgia affinis (Versluys, 1906)
- Callogorgia americana (Cairns & Bayer, 2002)
- Callogorgia arawak (Bayer, Cairns, Cordeiro & Pérez, 2014)
- Callogorgia chariessa (Bayer, 1982)
- Callogorgia cristata (Aurivillius, 1931)
- Callogorgia delta (Cairns & Bayer, 2003)
- Callogorgia dubia (Thomson & Henderson, 1906)
- Callogorgia elegans (Gray, 1870)
- Callogorgia flabellum (Ehrenberg, 1834)
- Callogorgia formosa (Kükenthal, 1907)
- Callogorgia galapagensis (Cairns, 2018)
- Callogorgia gilberti (Nutting, 1908)
- Callogorgia gracilis (Milne Edwards & Haime 1857)
- Callogorgia grimaldii (Studer, 1890)
- Callogorgia imperialis (Cairns in Cairns, Stone, Moon & Lee, 2017)
- Callogorgia indica (Versluys, 1906)
- Callogorgia joubini (Versluys, 1906)
- Callogorgia kinoshitae (Kükenthal, 1913)
- Callogorgia laevis (Thomson & Mackinnon, 1911)
- Callogorgia linguimaris (Bayer & Cairns, 2003)
- Callogorgia minuta (Versluys, 1906)
- Callogorgia modesta (Studer, 1879)
- Callogorgia pennacea (Versluys, 1906)
- Callogorgia pseudoflabellum (Song, 1981)
- Callogorgia ramosa (Kükenthal & Gorzawsky, 1908)
- Callogorgia robusta (Versluys, 1906)
- Callogorgia sertosa (Wright & Studer, 1889)
- Callogorgia similis (Versluys, 1906)
- Callogorgia versluysi (Thomson, 1905)
- Callogorgia verticillata (Pallas, 1766)
