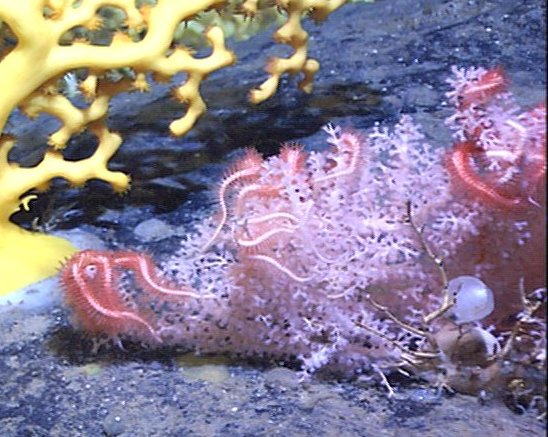
- Pink Candidella with brittle stars

Scientific classification
- Kingdom: Animalia
- Phylum: Cnidaria
- Subphylum: Anthozoa
- Class: Octocorallia
- Order: Scleralcyonacea
- Family: Primnoidae
- Genus: Candidella; Bayer, 1954

= Candidella =

Genus of corals

Candidella is a genus of corals belonging to the family Primnoidae.

The species of this genus are found in the Atlantic and Pacific Oceans.

Species:

- Candidella gigantea (Wright & Studer, 1889)
- Candidella helminthophora (Nutting, 1908)
- Candidella imbricata (Johnson, 1862)
- Candidella johnsoni (Wright & Studer, 1889)
