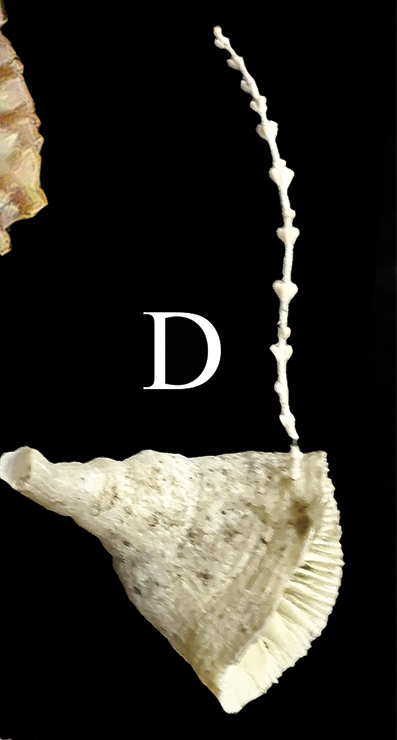
- Fig 5. Convexella magelhaenica using a Flabellum species as substrate

Scientific classification
- Domain: Eukaryota
- Kingdom: Animalia
- Phylum: Cnidaria
- Class: Octocorallia
- Order: Alcyonacea
- Family: Primnoidae
- Genus: Convexella; Bayer, 1996

Type species
- Convexella magelhaenica Studer, 1879

= Convexella =

Genus of corals

Convexella is a genus of corals belonging to the family Primnoidae, first described by Frederick Bayer in 1996.

Species from WoRMS:

- Convexella divergens (Hickson, 1907)
- Convexella jungerseni (Madsen, 1944)
- Convexella krampi (Madsen, 1956)
- Convexella magelhaenica (Studer, 1879)
- Convexella murrayi (Wright & Studer, 1889)

and from the Australian Faunal Directory:

- Convexella vanhoeffeni (Kükenthal, 1909)
