= Fannyella =

Scientific classification
- Kingdom: Animalia
- Phylum: Cnidaria
- Subphylum: Anthozoa
- Class: Octocorallia
- Order: Alcyonacea
- Family: Primnoidae
- Genus: Fannyella; Gray, 1872

Synonyms
- Ascolepis Thomson & Rennet, 1931

Genus of cnidarians

Fannyella is a genus of corals belonging to the family Primnoidae.

== Distribution ==
The species of this genus are found in southernmost Southern Hemisphere.

== Species ==
Species:

- Fannyella abies (Broch, 1965)
- Fannyella kuekenthali (Molander, 1929)
- Fannyella rossii Gray, 1872
- Fannyella spinosa (Thomson & Rennet, 1931)
