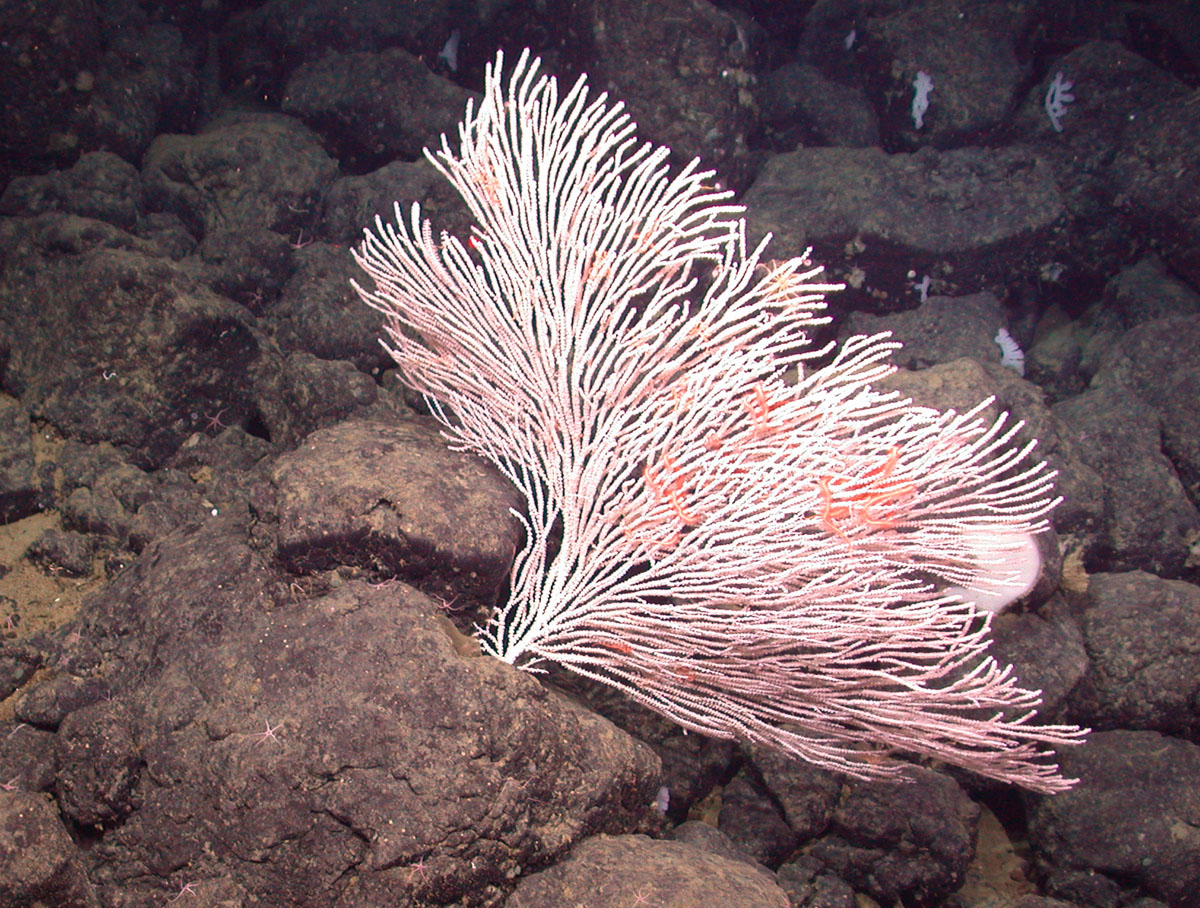

Scientific classification
- Domain: Eukaryota
- Kingdom: Animalia
- Phylum: Cnidaria
- Subphylum: Anthozoa
- Class: Octocorallia
- Order: Alcyonacea
- Family: Primnoidae
- Genus: Parastenella; Versluys, 1906

= Parastenella (coral) =

Genus of corals

Parastenella is a genus of cnidarians belonging to the family Primnoidae.

The species of this genus are found in Pacific Ocean.

Species:

- Parastenella atlantica Cairns, 2007
- Parastenella bayeri Cairns, 2010
- Parastenella doederleini (Wright & Studer, 1889)
- Parastenella gymnogaster Cairns, 2007
- Parastenella pacifica Cairns, 2007
- Parastenella pomponiae Cairns, 2018
- Parastenella ramosa (Studer, 1894)
- Parastenella spinosa (Wright & Studer, 1889)
