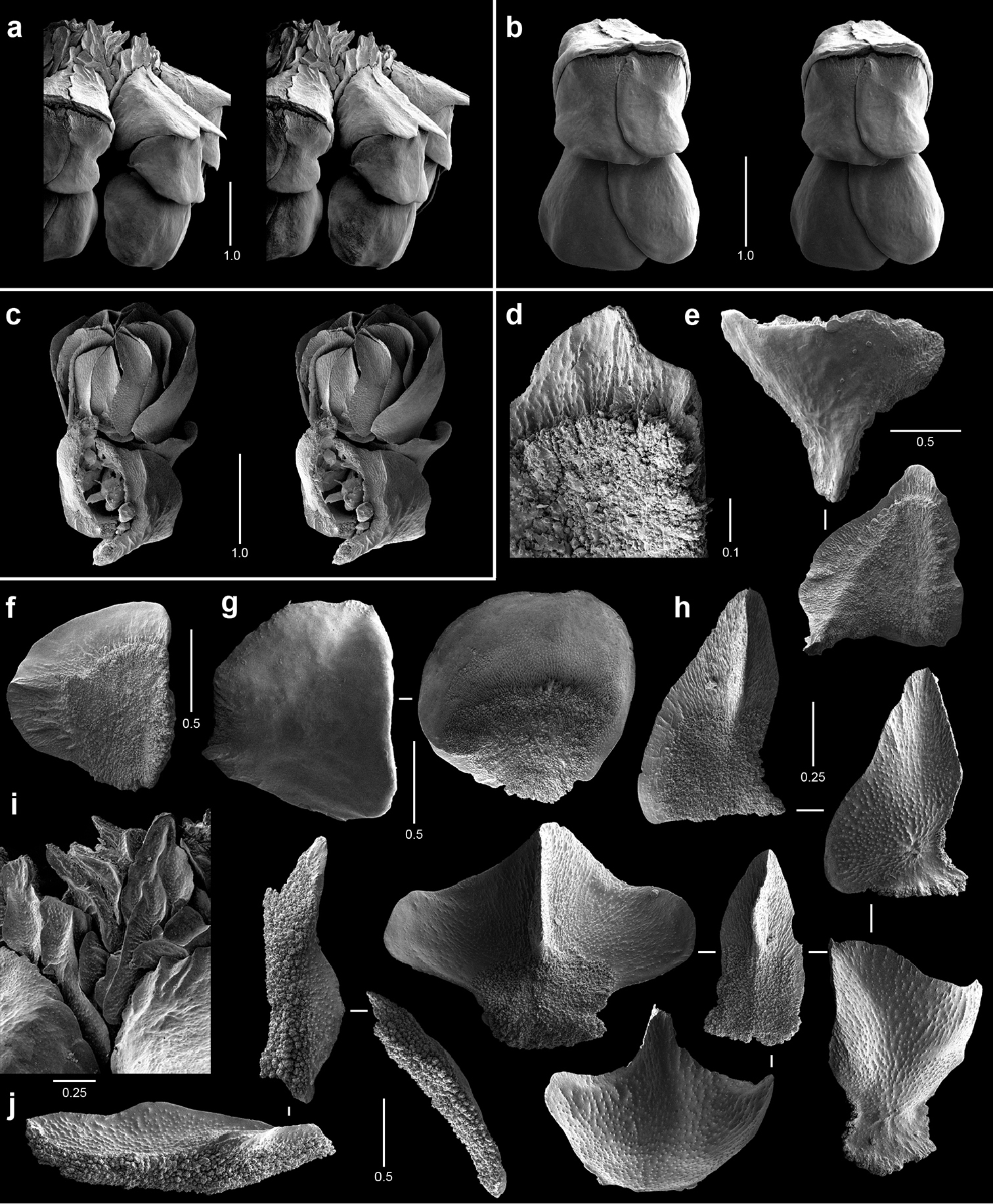

Scientific classification
- Domain: Eukaryota
- Kingdom: Animalia
- Phylum: Cnidaria
- Subphylum: Anthozoa
- Class: Octocorallia
- Order: Alcyonacea
- Family: Primnoidae
- Genus: Paracalyptrophora; Kinoshita, 1908

= Paracalyptrophora =

Genus of corals

Paracalyptrophora is a genus of corals belonging to the family Primnoidae.

The species of this genus are found in Pacific and Atlantic Ocean.

Species:

- Paracalyptrophora carinata Cairns & Bayer, 2004
- Paracalyptrophora duplex Cairns & Bayer, 2004
- Paracalyptrophora echinata Cairns, 2009
- Paracalyptrophora enigma Cairns, 2018
- Paracalyptrophora hawaiiensis Cairns, 2009
- Paracalyptrophora josephinae (Lindström, 1877)
- Paracalyptrophora kerberti Versluys, 1906
- Paracalyptrophora mariae (Versluys, 1906)
- Paracalyptrophora simplex Cairns & Bayer, 2004
- Paracalyptrophora spiralis Cairns, 2018
