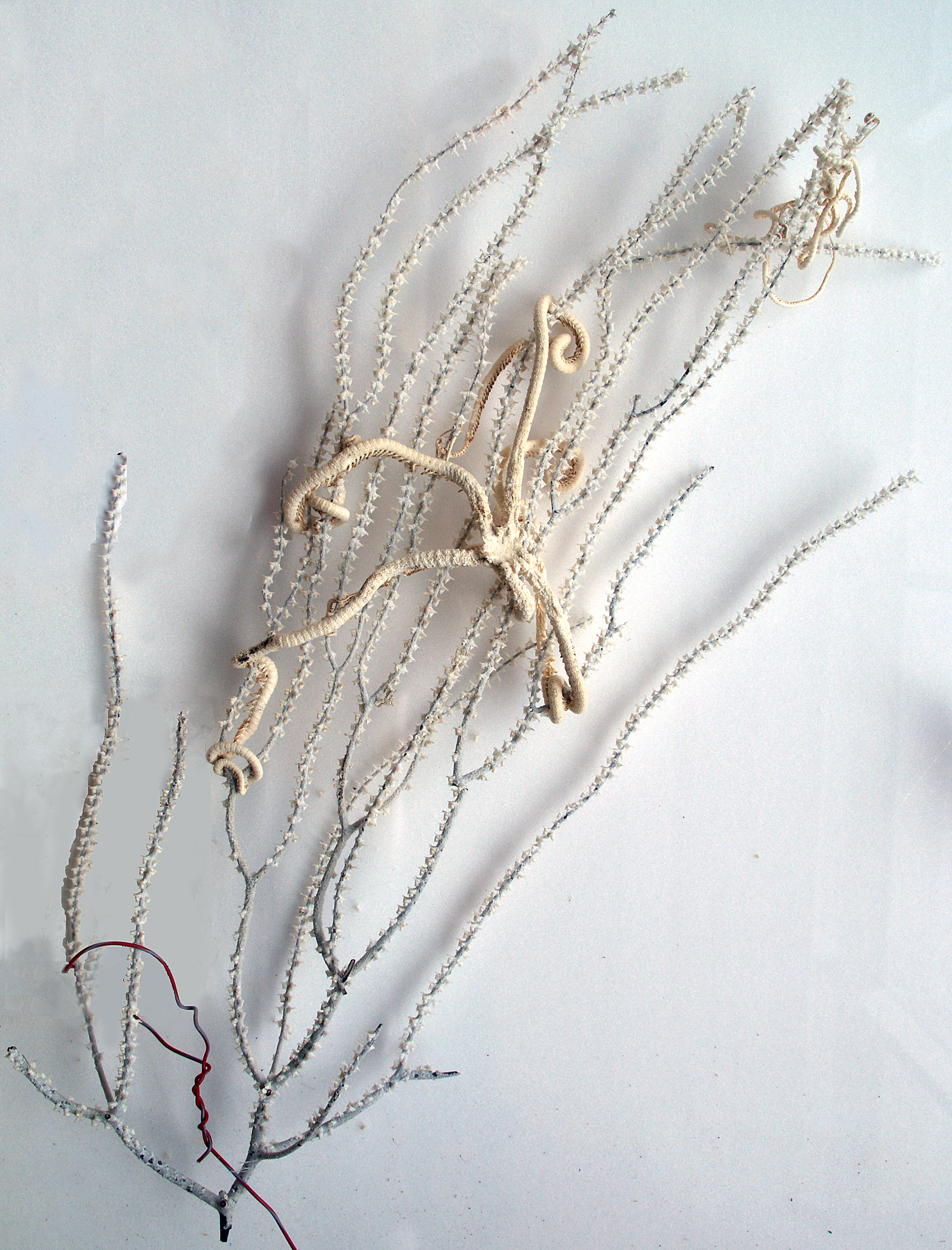
- Narella bowersi

Scientific classification
- Kingdom: Animalia
- Phylum: Cnidaria
- Subphylum: Anthozoa
- Class: Octocorallia
- Order: Scleralcyonacea
- Family: Primnoidae
- Genus: Narella; Gray, 1870

= Narella =

Genus of corals

Narella (Gray, 1870) is a genus of deep-sea soft corals in the family Primnoidae (Milne Edwards, 1857). They are sessile, bottom-dwelling organisms that can be found in all ocean basins, having cosmopolitan distribution. They have a branching appearance.

== History ==
=== Etymology ===
The name Narella is believed to be derived from the latin nares, meaning nostril, due to the resemblance of the rows of polyps to small noses.

=== Discovery ===
The present understanding of Narella and its members was only established in the late 20th century. Prior to that, many members of Narella were categorized into other genera. While the genus itself was described in 1870 by John Edward Gray, the first species in the genus was described in 1860, Primnoa regularis (now recognized as Narella regularis). In 1887 several new species of Narella were discovered by Edward Wright and Théophile Studer, but were described as members of new genera Stachyodes and Calypterinus. Between 1906 and 1919 many new species of Narella were discovered, though many were described as members of Stachyodes or Calypterinus. It was only in 1951 that Frederick Bayer synonymized these genera with Narella, establishing the former as junior synonyms of the latter.

== Distribution ==
Narella is the most species-rich genus in Primnoidae. They are found worldwide, with species occurring in the Atlantic, the Pacific, the Hawaiian Islands, the Indian Ocean, the Galápagos, and off the coast of Antarctica. While there have been a few species that are found in multiple regions, in general each region has a distinct group of sympatric species. This, along with Narella's high rate of adaptive radiation has led to researchers believing it to have many undiscovered species.

== Morphology ==
There are over 50 recognized species of Narella, but its type taxon is Narella regularis. Narella are distinguished from other members of Primnoidae by their conspicuous polyps which have very distinct large scales, also called sclerites. Most species of Narella have 16 - 18 sclerites that are always arranged in pairs. Polyps in members of Primnoidae are covered at the tip by opercular scales. In Narella, these eight opercular scales are paired together, giving them a symmetrical appearance. Physical differences amongst individual species of Narella primarily involve the shape and texture of the scales. These characteristics are difficult to identify in the field thus most broader identification guides focus on branching instead.

The axis of corals in this genus are made of aragonite, while their spicules are made of high Mg calcite. They anchor themselves to hard substrates using calcareous discoid holdfasts.

== Species ==
The following are species currently recognized in the genus.

- Narella abyssalis Cairns & Baco, 2007
- Narella alaskensis Cairns & Baco, 2007
- Narella alata Cairns & Bayer, 2008
- Narella allmani Wright & Studer, 1889
- Narella alvinae Cairns & Bayer, 2003
- Narella ambigua Studer, 1894
- Narella arbuscula Cairns & Baco, 2007
- Narella aurantiaca Cairns, 2018
- Narella bayeri Cairns & Baco, 2007
- Narella bellissima Kükenthal, 1915
- Narella biannulata Kinoshita, 1907
- Narella bowersi Nutting, 1908
- Narella calamus Cairns, 2018
- Narella candidae Taylor & Rogers, 2017
- Narella clavata Versluys, 1906
- Narella compressa Kinoshita, 1908
- Narella cristata Cairns & Baco, 2007
- Narella dampieri Cairns, 2012
- Narella dichotoma Versluys, 1906
- Narella ferula Cairns, 2018
- Narella fordi Cairns, 2018
- Narella gaussi Kükenthal, 1912
- Narella gigas Cairns & Bayer, 2008
- Narella gilchristi J.S. Thomson, 1911
- Narella grandiflora Kükenthal, 1907
- Narella hawaiiensis Cairns & Bayer, 2008
- Narella horrida Versluys, 1906
- Narella hypsocalyx Cairns, 2012
- Narella japonensis Aurivillius, 1931
- Narella laxa Deichmann, 1936
- Narella leilae Bayer, 1951
- Narella macrocalyx Cairns & Bayer, 2008
- Narella megalepis Kinoshita, 1908
- Narella merga Cairns, 2018
- Narella mesolepis Cairns, 2012
- Narella mosaica Cairns, 2012
- Narella muzikae Cairns & Bayer, 2008
- Narella obscura Versluys, 1906
- Narella orientalis Versluys, 1906
- Narella ornata Bayer, 1995
- Narella parva Versluys, 1906
- Narella pauciflora Deichmann, 1936
- Narella regularis Duchassaing & Michelotti, 1860
- Narella spectabilis Cairns & Bayer, 2003
- Narella speighti Taylor & Rogers, 2017
- Narella studeri Versluys, 1906
- Narella valentine Taylor & Rogers, 2017
- Narella vermifera Cairns & Bayer, 2008
- Narella versluysi Hickson, 1909
- Narella virgosa Cairns, 2018
- Narella vulgaris Cairns, 2012
