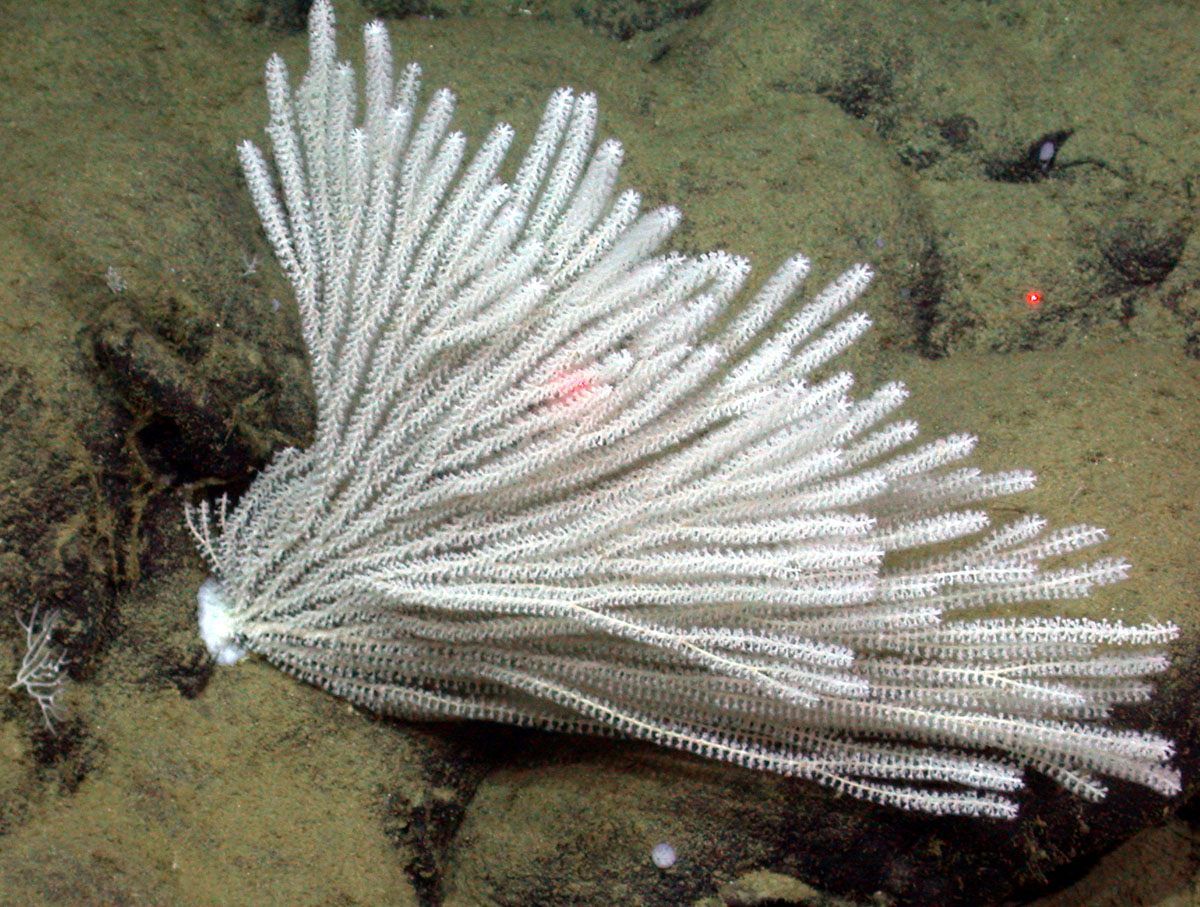
- Narella sp.

Scientific classification
- Kingdom: Animalia
- Phylum: Cnidaria
- Subphylum: Anthozoa
- Class: Octocorallia
- Order: Scleralcyonacea
- Family: Primnoidae; Milne Edwards, 1857

Genera
- See text

= Primnoidae =

Family of corals

Primnoidae is a family of soft corals.

== Genera ==
The World Register of Marine Species includes the following genera in the family:

- Abyssoprimnoa Cairns, 2015
- Acanthoprimnoa Cairns & Bayer, 2004
- Aglaoprimnoa Bayer, 1996
- Ainigmaptilon Dean, 1926
- Armadillogorgia Bayer, 1980
- Arntzia López-González, Gili & Orejas, 2002
- Arthrogorgia Kükenthal, 1908
- Australogorgia Cairns & Bayer, 2009
- Callogorgia Gray, 1858
- Callozostron Wright, 1885
- Calyptrophora Gray, 1866
- Canarya Ocaña & van Ofwegen, 2003
- Candidella Bayer, 1954
- Convexella Bayer, 1996
- Dasystenella Versluys, 1906
- Fannyella Gray, 1872
- Faxiella Zapata-Guardiola & López-González, 2012
- Helicoprimnoa Cairns, 2012
- Heptaprimnoa Cairns, 2012
- Loboprimnoa Cairns, 2016
- Macroprimnoa Cairns, 2018
- Metafannyella Cairns & Bayer, 2009
- Metanarella Cairns, 2012
- Microprimnoa Bayer & Stefani, 1989
- Mirostenella Bayer, 1988
- Narella Gray, 1870
- Narelloides Cairns, 2012
- Onogorgia Cairns & Bayer, 2009
- Ophidiogorgia Bayer, 1980
- Pachyprimnoa Cairns, 2016
- Paracalyptrophora Kinoshita, 1908
- Paranarella Cairns, 2007
- Parastenella Versluys, 1906
- Perissogorgia Bayer & Stefani, 1989
- Plumarella Gray, 1870
- Primnoa Lamouroux, 1812
- Primnocapsa Zapata-Guardiola & López-González, 2012
- Primnoeides Studer & Wright, 1887
- Primnoella Gray, 1858
- Pseudoplumarella Kükenthal, 1915
- Pterostenella Versluys, 1906
- Pyrogorgia Cairns & Bayer, 2009
- Scopaegorgia Zapata-Guardiola & Lopez-González, 2010
- Thouarella Gray, 1870
- Tokoprymno Bayer, 1996
- Verticillata Zapata-Guardiola, López-González & Gili, 2013
