= Tritonia fimbriata =

Scientific classification
- Kingdom: Animalia
- Phylum: Mollusca
- Class: Gastropoda
- Order: Nudibranchia
- Suborder: Tritoniacea
- Family: Tritoniidae
- Genus: Tritonia
- Species: T. fimbriata

Binomial name
- Tritonia fimbriata (Müller, 1776)

Synonyms
- Doris fimbriata Müller, 1776

Species of gastropod

Tritonia fimbriata is a species of dendronotid nudibranch. It is a marine gastropod mollusc in the family Tritoniidae.
