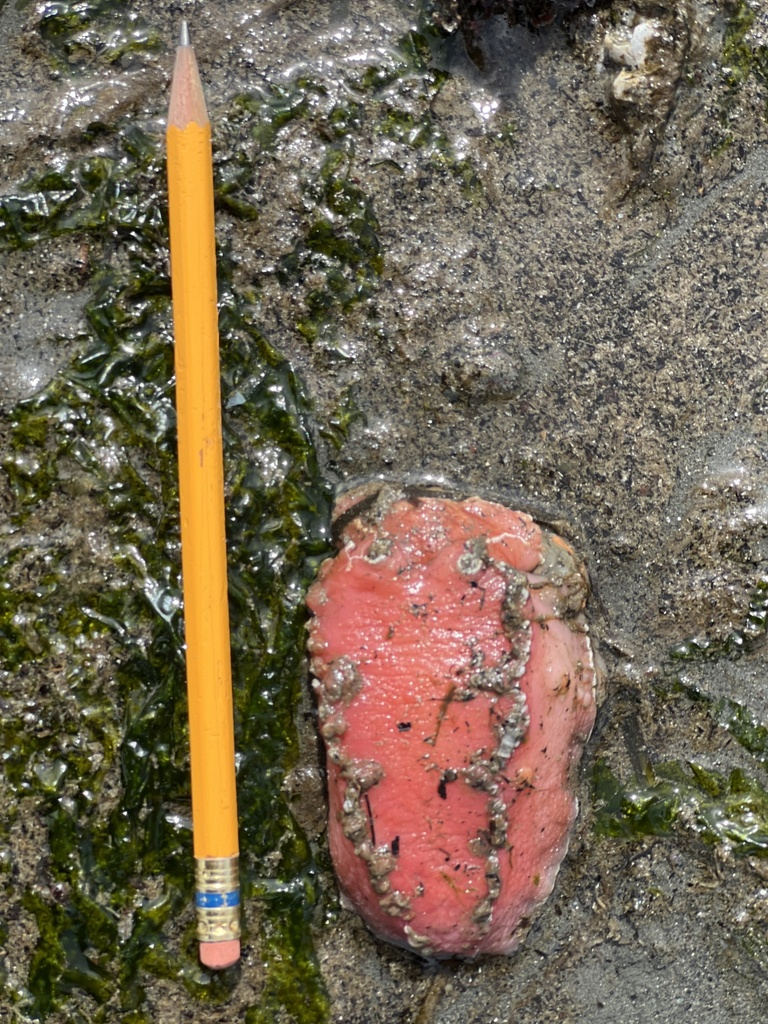
- With a pencil for scale.

Scientific classification
- Kingdom: Animalia
- Phylum: Mollusca
- Class: Gastropoda
- Order: Nudibranchia
- Suborder: Tritoniacea
- Family: Tritoniidae
- Genus: Tritonia
- Species: T. exsulans

Binomial name
- Tritonia exsulans Bergh, 1894

= Tritonia exsulans =

Species of gastropod

Tritonia exsulans is a species of dendronotid nudibranch. It is a marine gastropod mollusc in the family Tritoniidae.

== Distribution ==
This species is found in the NE Pacific in shallow water, to 100 m depth. It has been frequently confused with Tritonia tetraquetra and Tritonia diomedea.
