= Tritonia undulata =

Scientific classification
- Kingdom: Animalia
- Phylum: Mollusca
- Class: Gastropoda
- Order: Nudibranchia
- Suborder: Tritoniacea
- Family: Tritoniidae
- Genus: Tritonia
- Species: T. undulata

Binomial name
- Tritonia undulata (O'Donoghue, 1924)

Species of gastropod

Tritonia undulata is a species of sea slug, a dendronotid nudibranch. It is a marine gastropod mollusc in the family Tritoniidae.
