= Tritonia vorax =

Scientific classification
- Kingdom: Animalia
- Phylum: Mollusca
- Class: Gastropoda
- Order: Nudibranchia
- Suborder: Tritoniacea
- Family: Tritoniidae
- Genus: Tritonia
- Species: T. vorax

Binomial name
- Tritonia vorax (Odhner, 1926)

Species of gastropod

Tritonia vorax is a species of sea slug, a dendronotid nudibranch. It is a marine gastropod mollusc in the family Tritoniidae.

== Distribution ==
It is found of the coasts of Argentina, Chile, Antarctica, the Falkland Islands, and South Georgia and the South Sandwich Islands.
