= Tritonia bollandi =

Scientific classification
- Kingdom: Animalia
- Phylum: Mollusca
- Class: Gastropoda
- Order: Nudibranchia
- Suborder: Tritoniacea
- Family: Tritoniidae
- Genus: Tritonia
- Species: T. bollandi

Binomial name
- Tritonia bollandi Smith & Gosliner, 2003

Species of gastropod

Tritonia bollandi is a species of dendronotid nudibranch. It is a marine gastropod mollusc in the family Tritoniidae.

== Distribution ==
The type locality of this species is Seragaki Tombs, Okinawa. It is also reported from Indonesia and from Singapore.
