= Tritonia antarctica =

Scientific classification
- Kingdom: Animalia
- Phylum: Mollusca
- Class: Gastropoda
- Order: Nudibranchia
- Suborder: Tritoniacea
- Family: Tritoniidae
- Genus: Tritonia
- Species: T. antarctica

Binomial name
- Tritonia antarctica Pfeffer in Martens & Pfeffer, 1886

Species of gastropod

Tritonia antarctica is a species of dendronotid nudibranch. It is a marine gastropod mollusc in the family Tritoniidae.

== Distribution ==
This species is known from Antarctica.
