= Tritonia pallescens =

Scientific classification
- Kingdom: Animalia
- Phylum: Mollusca
- Class: Gastropoda
- Order: Nudibranchia
- Suborder: Tritoniacea
- Family: Tritoniidae
- Genus: Tritonia
- Species: T. pallescens

Binomial name
- Tritonia pallescens Eliot, 1906

Species of gastropod

Tritonia pallescens is a species of dendronotid nudibranch. It is a marine gastropod mollusc in the family Tritoniidae.

== Distribution ==
This species was discovered in the Cape Verde islands.
