= Tritonia hirondelle =

Scientific classification
- Kingdom: Animalia
- Phylum: Mollusca
- Class: Gastropoda
- Order: Nudibranchia
- Suborder: Tritoniacea
- Family: Tritoniidae
- Genus: Tritonia
- Species: T. hirondelle

Binomial name
- Tritonia hirondelle Ortea & Moro, 2020

Species of gastropod

Tritonia hirondelle is a species of dendronotid nudibranch. It is a marine gastropod mollusc in the family Tritoniidae.

== Distribution ==
This species was found off the island of Fogo in the Cape Verde islands, at 260 m depth, 14°50′N 024°28′W on a bright yellow octocoral, Acanthogorgia sp.
