= Tritonia punctata =

Scientific classification
- Kingdom: Animalia
- Phylum: Mollusca
- Class: Gastropoda
- Order: Nudibranchia
- Suborder: Tritoniacea
- Family: Tritoniidae
- Genus: Tritonia
- Species: T. punctata

Binomial name
- Tritonia punctata (Dalyell, 1853)

Species of marine mollusc

Tritonia punctata is a species of dendronotid nudibranch. It is a marine gastropod mollusc in the family Tritoniidae.
