= Tritonia australis =

Scientific classification
- Kingdom: Animalia
- Phylum: Mollusca
- Class: Gastropoda
- Order: Nudibranchia
- Suborder: Tritoniacea
- Family: Tritoniidae
- Genus: Tritonia
- Species: T. australis

Binomial name
- Tritonia australis (Bergh, 1898)

Synonyms
- Candiella australis Bergh, 1898

Species of gastropod

Tritonia australis is a species of dendronotid nudibranch. It is a marine gastropod mollusc in the family Tritoniidae.

== Distribution ==
This species was described from Calbuco, Chile 41.77°S 73.11°W.
