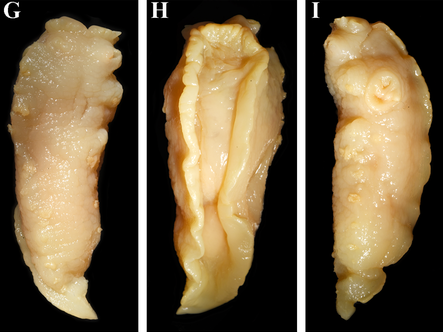

Scientific classification
- Kingdom: Animalia
- Phylum: Mollusca
- Class: Gastropoda
- Order: Nudibranchia
- Suborder: Tritoniacea
- Family: Tritoniidae
- Genus: Tritonia
- Species: T. primorjensis

Binomial name
- Tritonia primorjensis Minichev, 1971

= Tritonia primorjensis =

Species of gastropod

Tritonia primorjensis is a species of dendronotid nudibranch. It is a marine gastropod mollusc in the family Tritoniidae.
