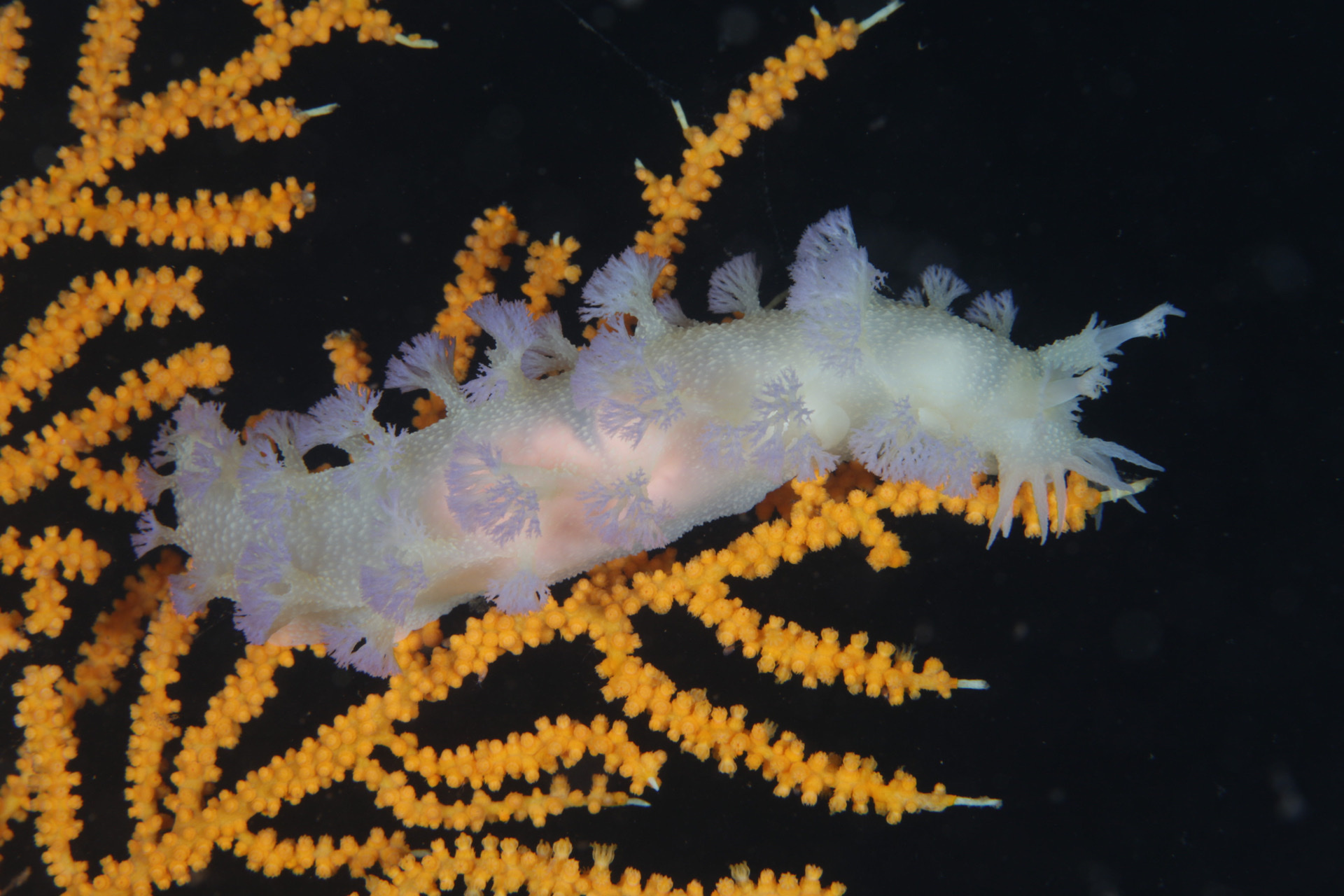

Scientific classification
- Kingdom: Animalia
- Phylum: Mollusca
- Class: Gastropoda
- Order: Nudibranchia
- Suborder: Tritoniacea
- Family: Tritoniidae
- Genus: Tritonia
- Species: T. griegi

Binomial name
- Tritonia griegi (Odhner, 1922)

= Tritonia griegi =

Species of gastropod

Tritonia griegi is a species of dendronotid nudibranch. It is a marine gastropod mollusc in the family Tritoniidae.

== Distribution ==
This species is found in Norway.
