= Tritonia callogorgiae =

Scientific classification
- Kingdom: Animalia
- Phylum: Mollusca
- Class: Gastropoda
- Order: Nudibranchia
- Suborder: Tritoniacea
- Family: Tritoniidae
- Genus: Tritonia
- Species: T. callogorgiae

Binomial name
- Tritonia callogorgiae Chimienti, Furfaro & Taviani, 2020

Species of gastropod

Tritonia callogorgiae is a species of dendronotid nudibranch. It is a marine gastropod mollusc in the family Tritoniidae.

== Distribution ==
This species is found in the Southern Adriatic Sea, Mediterranean Sea, 30 nautical miles SW of Bar, Montenegro, at 420–426 m depth, 41°38.85′N 18°41.50′E.
