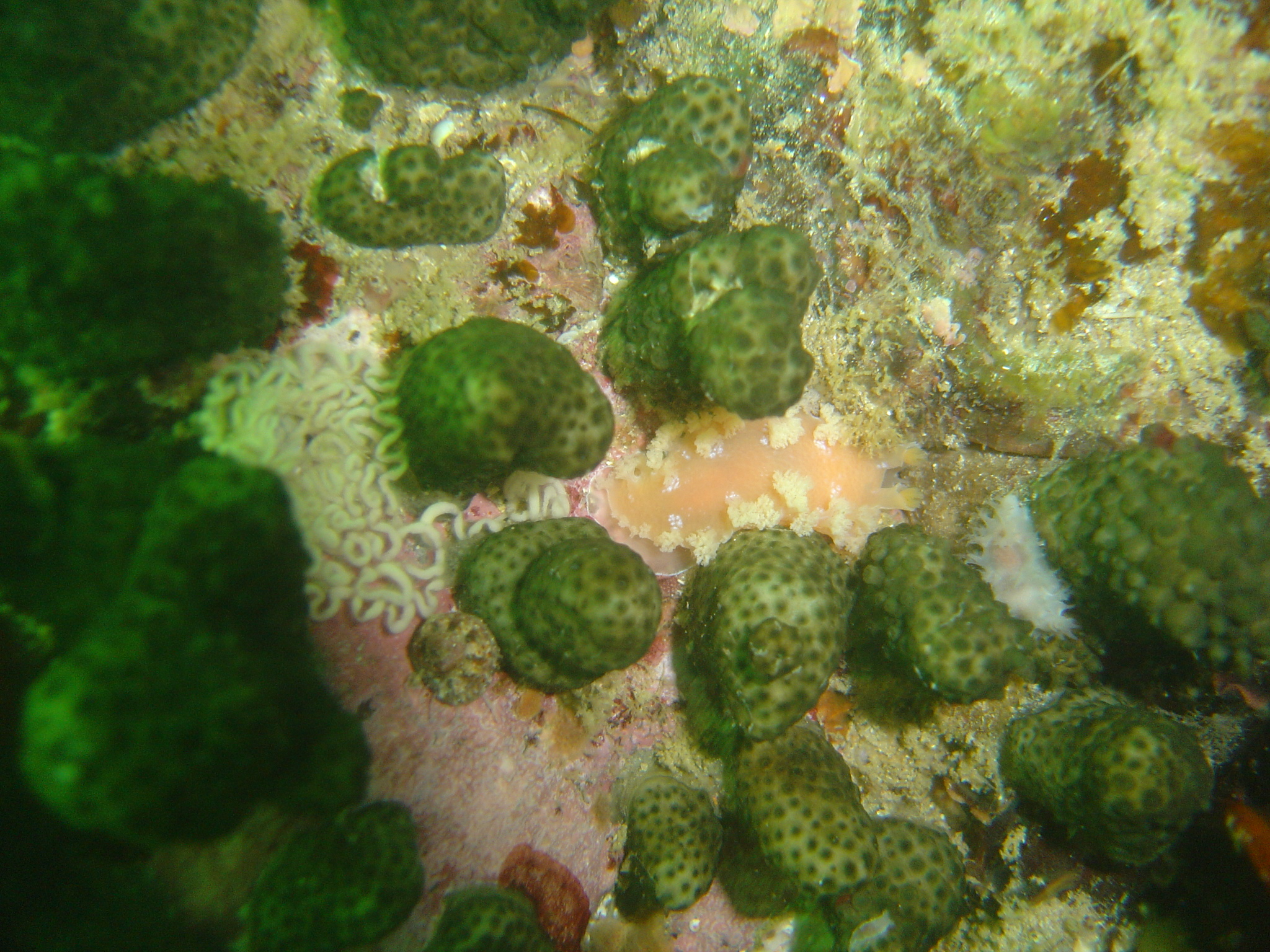
- Brush nudibranch with egg ribbons

Scientific classification
- Kingdom: Animalia
- Phylum: Mollusca
- Class: Gastropoda
- Order: Nudibranchia
- Suborder: Tritoniacea
- Family: Tritoniidae
- Genus: Tritonia
- Species: Tritonia sp. 2

Binomial name
- Tritonia sp. 2

= Brush nudibranch =

Species of gastropod

The brush nudibranch, Tritonia sp. 2, as designated by Gosliner, 1987, is a species of dendronotid nudibranch. It is a marine gastropod mollusc in the family Tritoniidae. As at November 2009, it remained undescribed by science.

== Distribution ==
This species has only been found off South Africa, from the Atlantic coast of the Cape Peninsula to Jeffreys Bay, intertidally to 40 m. It appears to be endemic.

== Description ==
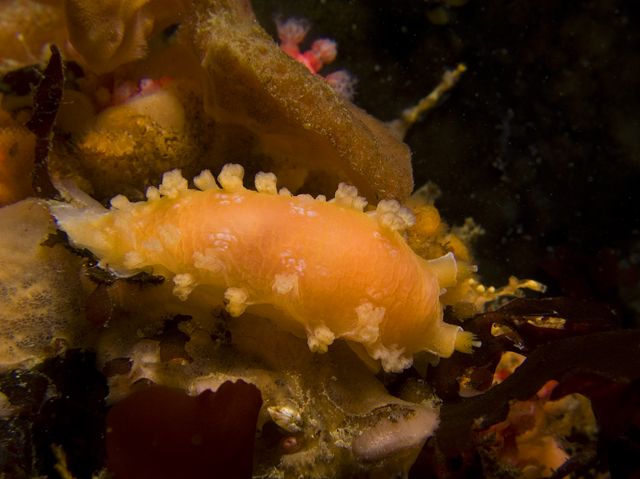

The brush nudibranch reaches 50 mm in size. Its body is apricot-coloured with clusters of white spots on its notum. Its short rhinophores extend from cup-like sheaths. It has short paired branching projections down the length of its body. Short branching tentacles extend from the front of its head.

== Ecology ==
The brush nudibranch probably feeds on soft corals. Its egg mass is opaque, white and highly convoluted.
