= Tritonia dantarti =

Scientific classification
- Kingdom: Animalia
- Phylum: Mollusca
- Class: Gastropoda
- Order: Nudibranchia
- Suborder: Tritoniacea
- Family: Tritoniidae
- Genus: Tritonia
- Species: T. dantarti

Binomial name
- Tritonia dantarti Ballesteros & Avila, 2006

Species of gastropod

Tritonia dantarti is a species of dendronotid nudibranch. It is a marine gastropod mollusc in the family Tritoniidae.

== Distribution ==
This species was described from depths of 134 m off Bouvet Island, Southern Ocean, 54°22.49′S 3°17.58′E.
