= Tritonia newfoundlandica =

Scientific classification
- Kingdom: Animalia
- Phylum: Mollusca
- Class: Gastropoda
- Order: Nudibranchia
- Suborder: Tritoniacea
- Family: Tritoniidae
- Genus: Tritonia
- Species: T. newfoundlandica

Binomial name
- Tritonia newfoundlandica Valdés, Murillo, McCarthy & Yedinak, 2017

Species of gastropod

Tritonia newfoundlandica is a species of dendronotid nudibranch. It is a marine gastropod mollusc in the family Tritoniidae.

== Distribution ==
This species was found off Flemish Cap, west of Newfoundland at 538–492 m depth, 46°26′55.2″N 45°45′14.4″W.
