= Tritonia ingolfiana =

Scientific classification
- Kingdom: Animalia
- Phylum: Mollusca
- Class: Gastropoda
- Order: Nudibranchia
- Suborder: Tritoniacea
- Family: Tritoniidae
- Genus: Tritonia
- Species: T. ingolfiana

Binomial name
- Tritonia ingolfiana (Bergh, 1899)

Species of gastropod

Tritonia ingolfiana is a species of small sea slug, a dendronotid nudibranch. It is a marine gastropod mollusc in the family Tritoniidae. It is found in the Black Sea.
