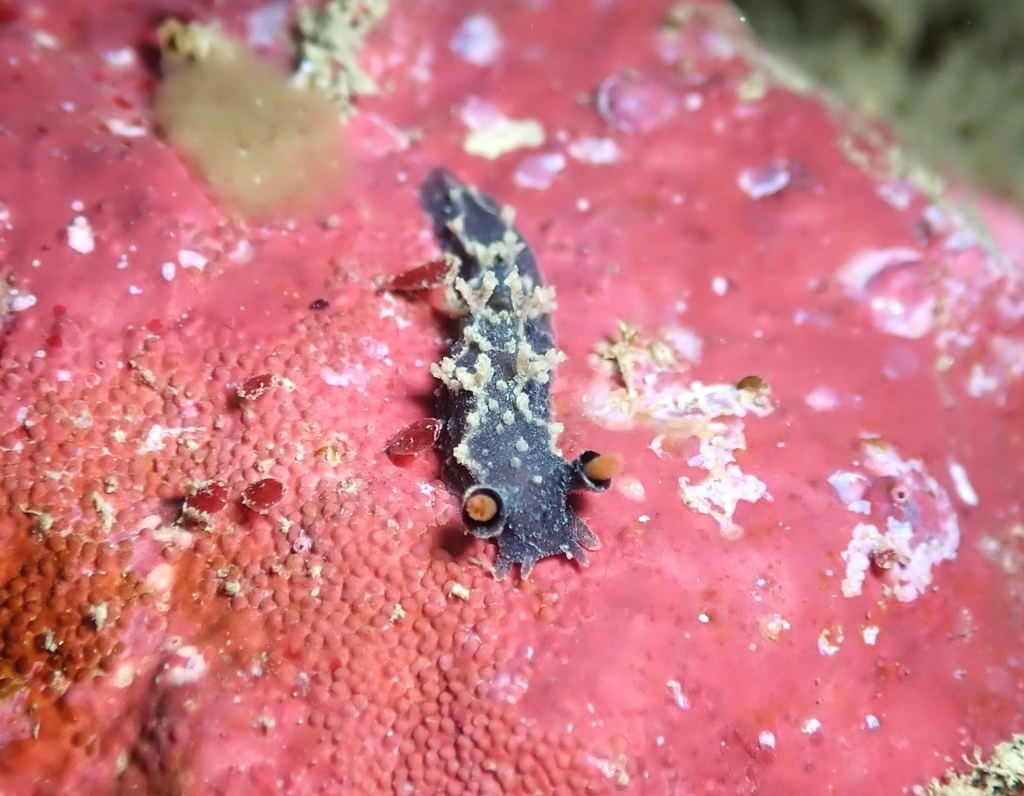

Scientific classification
- Kingdom: Animalia
- Phylum: Mollusca
- Class: Gastropoda
- Order: Nudibranchia
- Suborder: Tritoniacea
- Family: Tritoniidae
- Genus: Tritonia
- Species: T. flemingi

Binomial name
- Tritonia flemingi (Powell, 1937)

Synonyms
- Sphaerostoma flemingi Powell, 1937

= Tritonia flemingi =

Species of gastropod

Tritonia flemingi is a species of dendronotid nudibranch. It is a marine gastropod mollusc in the family Tritoniidae.

== Distribution ==
This species was described from New Zealand. It has been found at Wellington and the Poor Knights Islands.
