= Tritonia indecora =

Scientific classification
- Kingdom: Animalia
- Phylum: Mollusca
- Class: Gastropoda
- Order: Nudibranchia
- Suborder: Tritoniacea
- Family: Tritoniidae
- Genus: Tritonia
- Species: T. indecora

Binomial name
- Tritonia indecora Bergh, 1907

Synonyms
- Sphaerostoma indecorum (Bergh, 1907)

Species of gastropod

Tritonia indecora is a species of dendronotid nudibranch. It is a marine gastropod mollusc in the family Tritoniidae.
