= Tritonia episcopalis =

Scientific classification
- Kingdom: Animalia
- Phylum: Mollusca
- Class: Gastropoda
- Order: Nudibranchia
- Suborder: Tritoniacea
- Family: Tritoniidae
- Genus: Tritonia
- Species: T. episcopalis

Binomial name
- Tritonia episcopalis Bouchet, 1977

Species of gastropod

Tritonia episcopalis is a species of dendronotid nudibranch. It is a marine gastropod mollusc in the family Tritoniidae.

== Distribution ==
This species was found in the Bay of Biscay, at 2170 m depth, 44°09.8′N 004°16.4′W.
