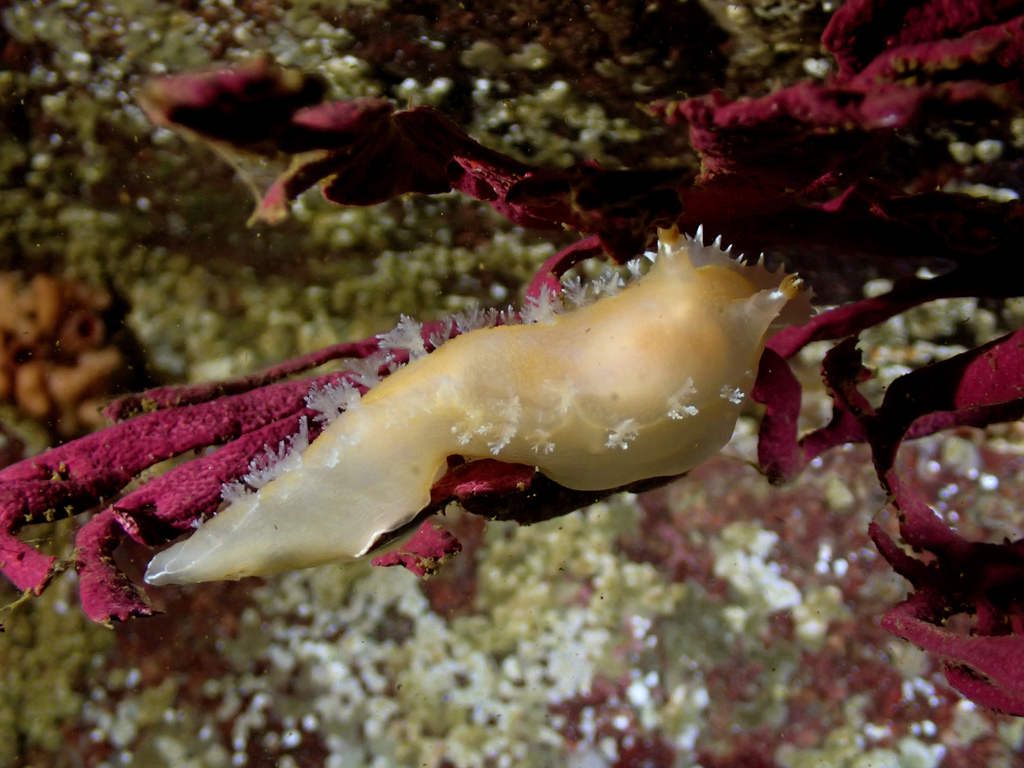

Scientific classification
- Kingdom: Animalia
- Phylum: Mollusca
- Class: Gastropoda
- Order: Nudibranchia
- Suborder: Tritoniacea
- Family: Tritoniidae
- Genus: Tritonia
- Species: T. odhneri

Binomial name
- Tritonia odhneri (Marcus, 1959)

Synonyms
- Tritonia eriosi (Ev. Marcus, 1983)

= Tritonia odhneri =

Species of gastropod

Tritonia odhneri is a species of dendronotid nudibranch. It is a marine gastropod mollusc in the family Tritoniidae.

== Distribution ==
It is mostly found off the southern coast of South America.
