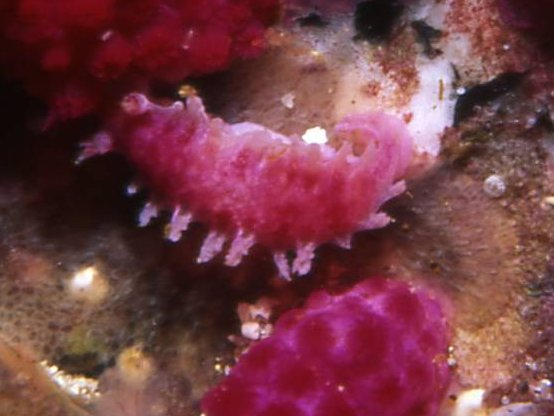

Scientific classification
- Kingdom: Animalia
- Phylum: Mollusca
- Class: Gastropoda
- Order: Nudibranchia
- Suborder: Tritoniacea
- Family: Tritoniidae
- Genus: Tritonia
- Species: T. sp. 1

Binomial name
- Tritonia sp. 1

= Soft coral nudibranch =

Species of gastropod

The soft coral nudibranch, Tritonia sp. 1, as designated by Gosliner, 1987, is a species of small sea slug, a dendronotid nudibranch. It is a marine gastropod mollusc in the family Tritoniidae. As of November 2009, it was undescribed by science.

== Distribution ==
This species has so far been found only off South Africa, from False Bay to Port Elizabeth, intertidally to 14 m. It appears to be endemic to the area.

== Description ==
The soft coral nudibranch is a very well-camouflaged animal which closely resembles the soft corals on which it feeds. It is small, reaching 30 mm, and its body is white to brown or purple. Its branched rhinophores extend from cup-like sheaths. Paired branching projections down the length of the body mimic the feeding polyps of its prey. Elongated branching tentacles extend from the front of its head.

== Ecology ==
This nudibranch feeds on soft corals of the genus Alcyonium. It lays an opaque white egg mass which is highly convoluted.
