= Tritonia coralliumrubri =

Scientific classification
- Kingdom: Animalia
- Phylum: Mollusca
- Class: Gastropoda
- Order: Nudibranchia
- Suborder: Tritoniacea
- Family: Tritoniidae
- Genus: Tritonia
- Species: T. coralliumrubri

Binomial name
- Tritonia coralliumrubri Doneddu, Sacco & Trainito, 2014

Species of gastropod

Tritonia coralliumrubri is a species of dendronotid nudibranch. It is a marine gastropod mollusc in the family Tritoniidae. It feeds on the octocoral Corallium rubrum, the red coral.

== Distribution ==
This species was found at Capo Caccia, Alghero, NW Sardinia, at 100 m depth, 40°59′N 008°11′E.
