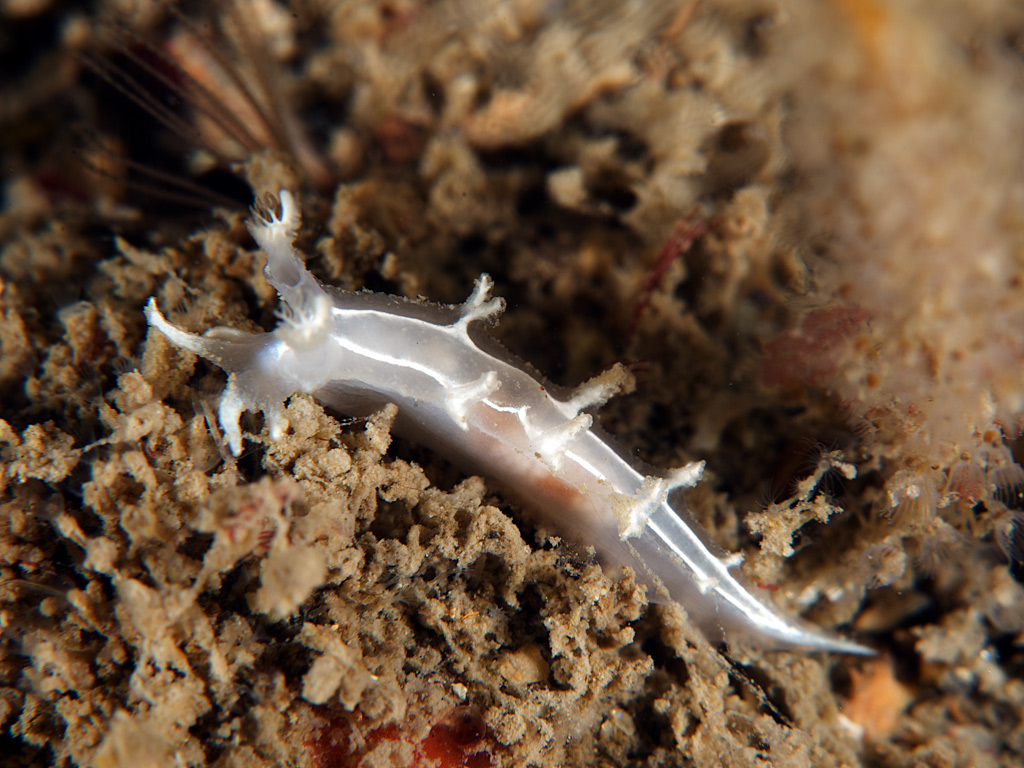
- The nudibranch Duvaucelia lineata, Martin's Haven, Pembrokeshire, Wales.

Scientific classification
- Kingdom: Animalia
- Phylum: Mollusca
- Class: Gastropoda
- Order: Nudibranchia
- Suborder: Tritoniacea
- Family: Tritoniidae
- Genus: Duvaucelia
- Species: D. lineata

Binomial name
- Duvaucelia lineata (Alder & A. Hancock, 1848)

Synonyms
- Tritonia lineata Alder & Hancock, 1848

= Duvaucelia lineata =

Species of gastropod

Duvaucelia lineata is a species of dendronotid nudibranch. It is a marine gastropod mollusc in the family Tritoniidae. Previously known as Tritonia lineata this species was moved to the genus Duvaucelia in 2020.

== Description ==
Duvaucelia lineata was originally discovered in 1846 and described by British malacologists Joshua Alder and Albany Hancock in 1848.

The original text (the type description) reads as follows:

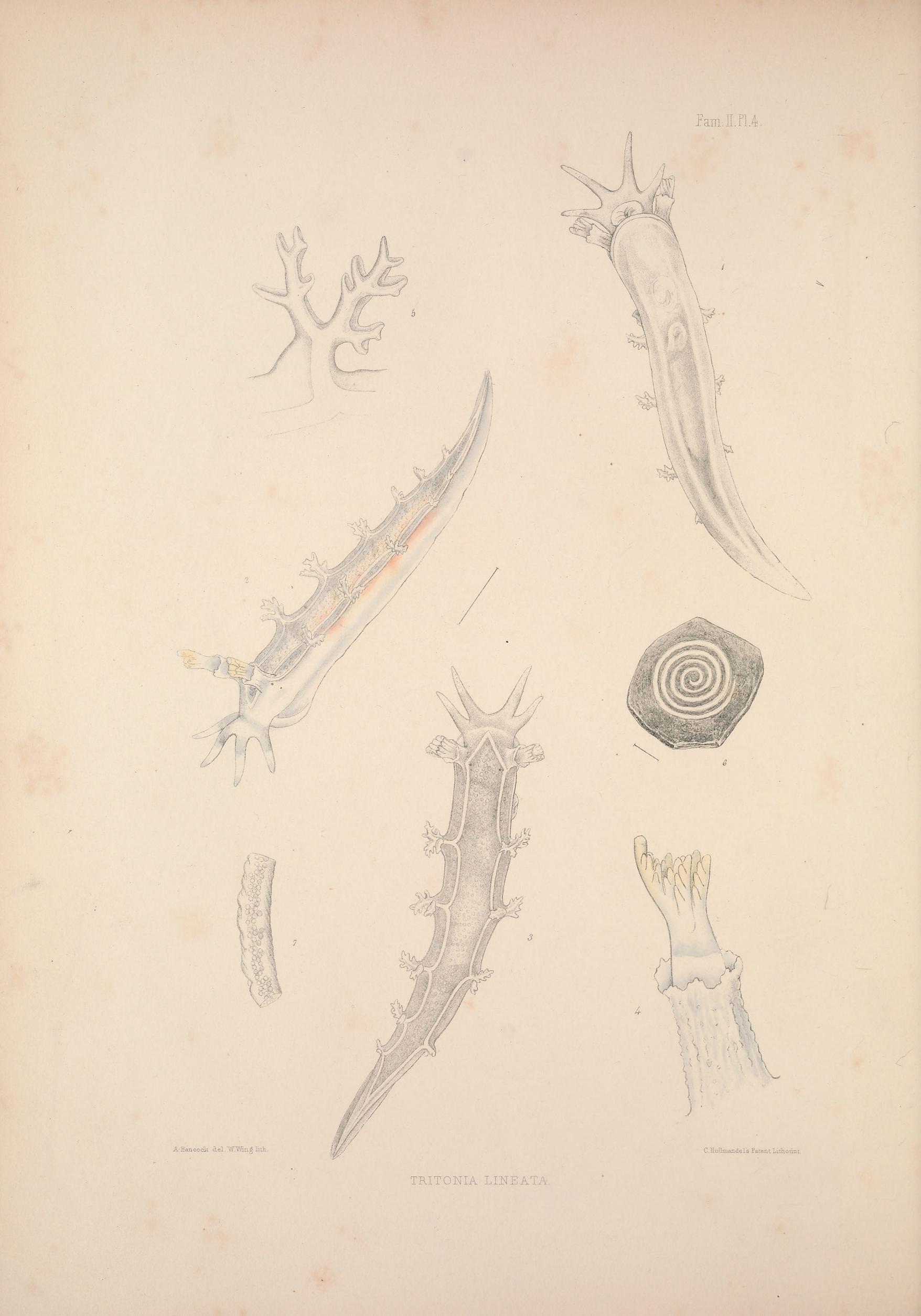
Duvaucelia lineata figured in A monograph of the British nudibranchiate Mollusca

Body very slender, pellucid white, with an opake white line along each side of the back, which is curved a little outwards opposite each branchial tuft. Veil produced into four long filaments; the two nearest the centre longest and tapering gradually to a point, the side ones shorter and obtuse. Tentacles pale yellow, the fascicules of filaments slender, and the sheaths rather tight. Branchiae rather slender, bipinnate, transparent, with an opake white line in the centre of each running into those on the back. Foot slender, rounded in front and terminating in a point behind. Length half an inch. This beautiful new Tritonia was discovered under stones at Scarborough in September 1846, while we were exploring the rocks in company with Mr. Bean.

== Distribution ==
The type locality is Scarborough, North Yorkshire, England. Duvaucelia lineata is found at scattered localities on the coasts of Great Britain and Ireland and in southern Norway and Brittany, France. It has also been reported from the Adriatic Sea, Croatia.
