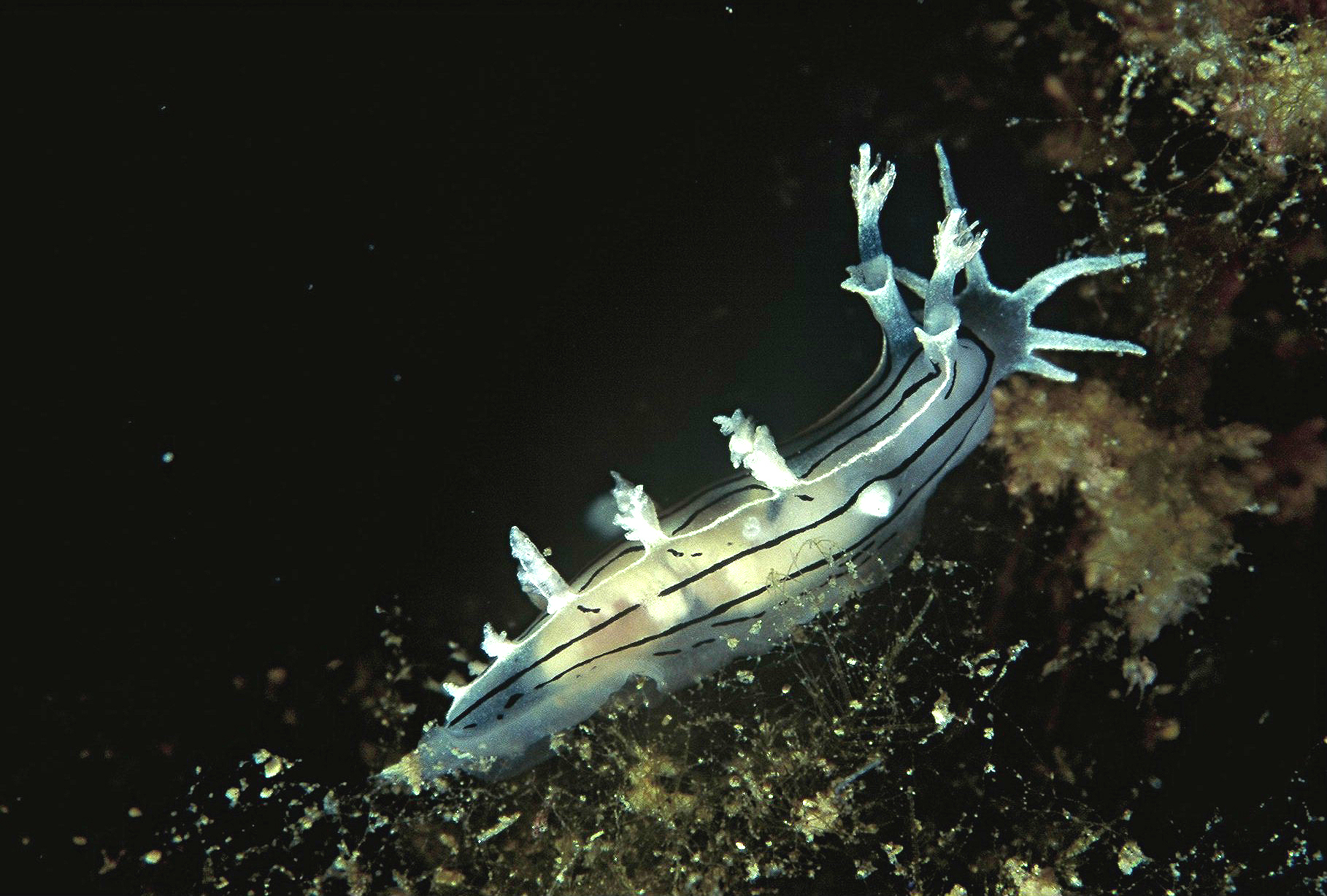

Scientific classification
- Kingdom: Animalia
- Phylum: Mollusca
- Class: Gastropoda
- Order: Nudibranchia
- Suborder: Tritoniacea
- Family: Tritoniidae
- Genus: Duvaucelia
- Species: D. striata

Binomial name
- Duvaucelia striata (Haefelfinger, 1963)

Synonyms
- Tritonia striata Haefelfinger, 1963

= Duvaucelia striata =

Species of gastropod

Duvaucelia striata is a species of dendronotid nudibranch from the western Mediterranean. It is a marine gastropod mollusc in the family Tritoniidae.

== Distribution ==
This species was described from Naples, Italy. It is found in the western Mediterranean from Italy to France and Spain.

== Ecology ==
Duvaucelia striata is reported to feed on the soft coral Paralcyonium elegans.
