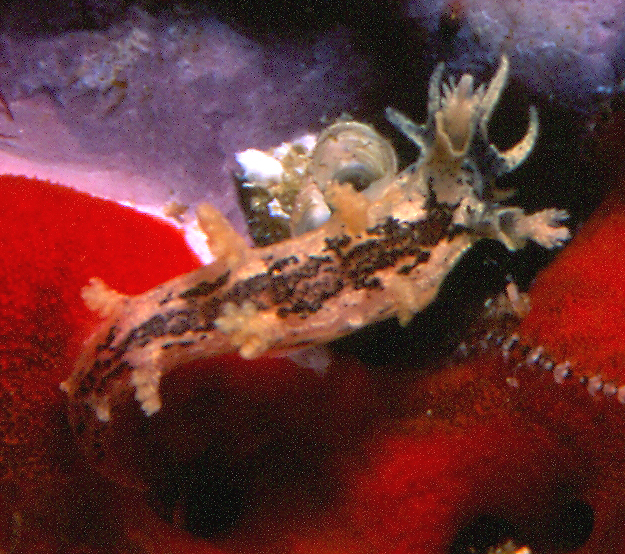

Scientific classification
- Kingdom: Animalia
- Phylum: Mollusca
- Class: Gastropoda
- Order: Nudibranchia
- Suborder: Tritoniacea
- Family: Tritoniidae
- Genus: Duvaucelia
- Species: D. manicata

Binomial name
- Duvaucelia manicata (Deshayes, 1853)

Synonyms
- Tritonia manicata Deshayes, 1853

= Duvaucelia manicata =

Species of gastropod

Duvaucelia manicata is a species of dendronotid nudibranch. It is a marine gastropod mollusc in the family Tritoniidae.

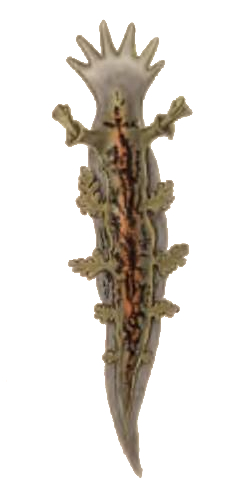
Drawing of dorsal view of Duvaucelia manicata from its original description by Gérard Paul Deshayes.

== Distribution ==
This species was described from France. It is known from the Mediterranean Sea north to south-west England.

== Ecology ==
The diet of this species is a soft coral.
