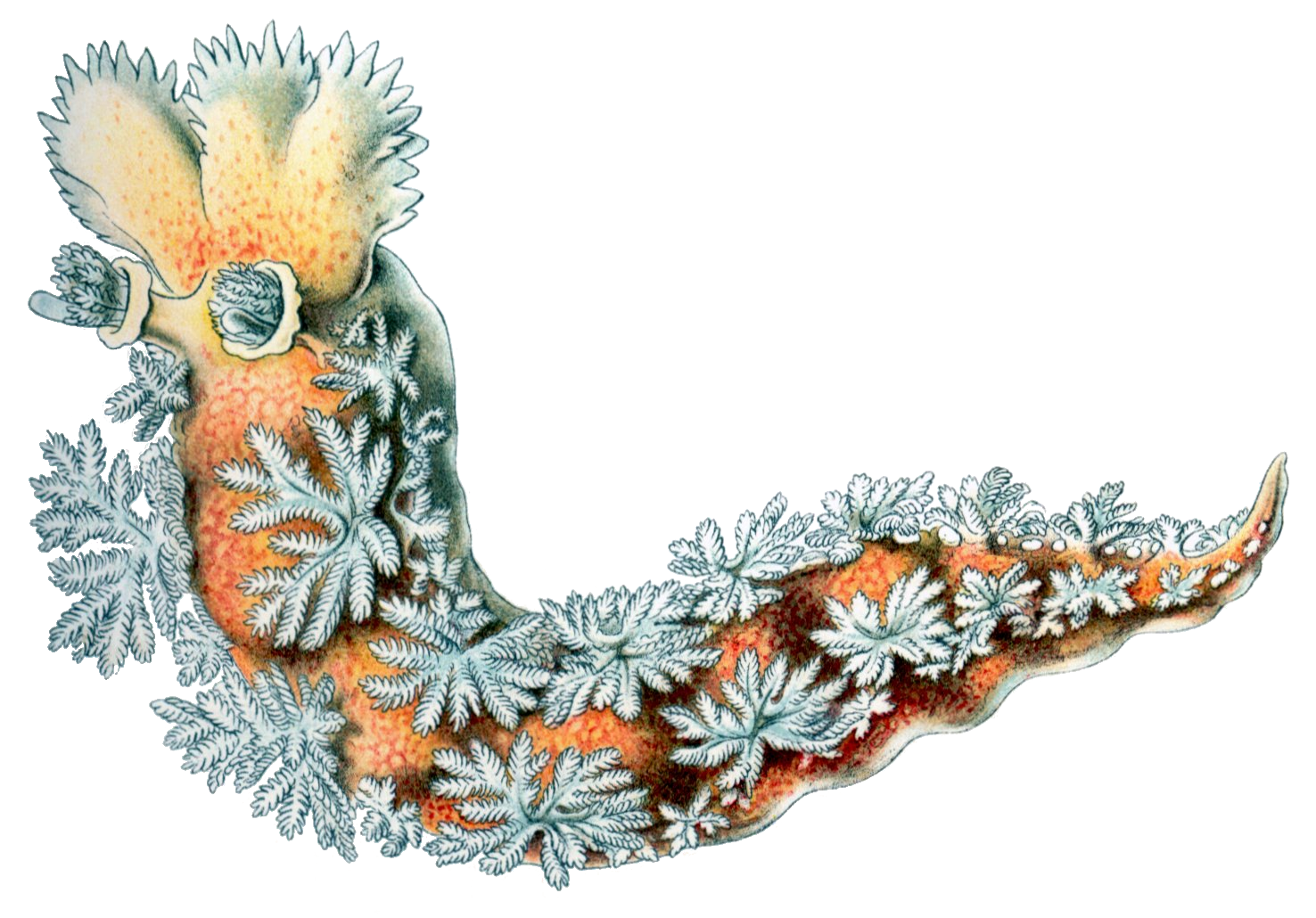
- Drawing of Tritonia hombergii from Kunstformen der Natur (1904)

Scientific classification
- Kingdom: Animalia
- Phylum: Mollusca
- Class: Gastropoda
- Order: Nudibranchia
- Suborder: Tritoniacea
- Family: Tritoniidae
- Genus: Tritonia
- Species: T. hombergii

Binomial name
- Tritonia hombergii Cuvier, 1803

Synonyms
- Sphaerostoma jamesonii MacGillivray, 1843; Sphaerostoma jamiesoni MacGillivray, 1843; Tritonia alba Alder & Hancock, 1854; Tritonia atrofusca MacGillivray, 1843; Tritonia conifera Dalyell, 1853; Tritonia divaricata Dalyell, 1853; Tritonia hombergi Cuvier, 1803 [orth. error]; Tritonia pustulosa Deshayes, 1853

= Tritonia hombergii =

Species of gastropod

Tritonia hombergii is a species of dendronotid nudibranch. It is a marine gastropod mollusc in the family Tritoniidae.

Tritonia hombergii is the type species of the genus Tritonia.

== Distribution ==
This species was described from Le Havre, France. It is frequently found in the NE Atlantic Ocean feeding on the soft coral Alcyonium digitatum.
