= Tritonia pallida (gastropod) =

Scientific classification
- Kingdom: Animalia
- Phylum: Mollusca
- Class: Gastropoda
- Order: Nudibranchia
- Suborder: Tritoniacea
- Family: Tritoniidae
- Genus: Tritonia
- Species: T. pallida

Binomial name
- Tritonia pallida (Stimpson, 1855)

Species of gastropod

Tritonia pallida is a species of dendronotid nudibranch. It is a marine gastropod mollusc in the family Tritoniidae. It is found of the coast of South Africa.
