= Seven Worlds, One Planet =

BBC documentary series

- Genre: Nature documentary
- Presented by: David Attenborough
- Theme music composer: Hans Zimmer; Jacob Shea
- Composer: Jacob Shea
- Country of origin: United Kingdom
- Original language: English
- No. of episodes: 7 + 1 Special

Production
- Executive producer: Scott Alexander
- Running time: 60 minutes
- Production company: BBC Natural History Unit

Original release
- Network: BBC One; BBC Earth
- Release: 27 October – 8 December 2019

Seven Worlds, One Planet is a television documentary series co-produced by the BBC Studios Natural History Unit, BBC America, ZDF, France Télévisions, Tencent Penguin Pictures and CCTV-9. The seven-part series, in which each episode focuses on one continent, premiered on BBC One on 27 October 2019 and is narrated and presented by naturalist Sir David Attenborough. Over 1,500 people worked on the series, which was filmed over 1,794 days, with 92 shoots across 41 countries.

== Music ==
Sia, Chris Braide and Hans Zimmer collaborated on the song "Out There" for the series. The original television soundtrack titled "Seven Worlds One Planet Suite" was made by Zimmer and Jacob Shea, while Shea wrote the series' score.

== Episodes ==
Viewing data sourced from BARB.

"Two hundred million years ago, our planet looked very different from what it does today. It was entirely covered by sea, which surrounded one single supercontinent we call Pangaea. And then, Pangaea began to break up. Life was cast adrift on fragments of land, and these fragments eventually became our seven continents. We will see how life developed on each continent, giving rise to the extraordinary and wonderful diversity that we see today."

— David Attenborough's opening words

| No. | Title | Produced by | Original release date | UK viewers (millions) |
|---|---|---|---|---|
| 1 | "Antarctica" | Fredi Devas | 27 October 2019 | 8.98 |
Antarctica—the coldest, windiest, most hostile continent. Only the toughest can survive here. From Weddell seals that grind back the ice with their teeth, to colourful starfish carpeting the seabed beneath the ice. Huge colonies of king penguins crowd any ice-free land, and four-tonne elephant seals fight for territory on the beach. Life comes here because the ocean that surrounds the continent is incredibly rich. However, the ocean here is warming and with that comes an uncertain future. Grey-headed albatross chicks battle for survival in the harsh gales of South Georgia, while southern right whales slowly recover from almost total annihilation at the hands of the whaling industry, and Gentoo penguins face orcas out in the sea and a dangerous trek across uneven ice where leopard seals dwell. There is still hope for this ice-bound continent; thousands of penguins, seals, albatrosses, and over a hundred great whales feast on krill baitballs, whilst below the ice on the sea floor, an entire ecosystem of sea anemones, starfish, nudibranches, jellyfish and giant nematode worms live out their lives in the icy depths.
| 2 | "Asia" | Emma Napper | 3 November 2019 | 8.86 |
Asia—the most varied and extreme continent—stretching from the Arctic Circle to the equator. Walruses gather in huge numbers in the frozen north, only to risk falling to their deaths after climbing sea cliffs to escape polar bears. Kamchatka brown bears roam remote Russian volcanoes on the Kamchatka Peninsula, and orangutans climb high into the trees in the Indonesian rainforests in search of mango fruit. This is a world of the rarely seen, from the yeti-like golden snub-nosed monkey in the mountain forests of China to the most bizarre predator in the baking Lut desert in Iran, the spider-tailed horned viper, which camouflages itself against the rocks, then tricks migrating birds into going after its specialised tail. In Northern India two male Sarada lizards compete to gain the right to territory and the females within it, raising brightly coloured sails on their necks. Asia is the largest of all continents but it seems there is not enough space for wildlife, as humans are decimating Indonesia to create vast oil palm plantations. The deep jungles provide sanctuary for the last few Sumatran rhinos, who are among the species being threatened by this activity the most and have been walled in for their own safety against poachers and loggers. However, human kindness also exists in the south-east, as fishermen regularly help groups of whale sharks by supplying them with some of their catch, in spite of the gigantic fish being worth a fortune in meat.
| 3 | "South America" | Chadden Hunter | 10 November 2019 | 8.44 |
South America—the most species-rich continent on Earth. From the volcanoes of the Andes to the world's largest rainforest, the Amazon, animals here must specialise to carve out a niche. In Patagonia, a puma mother draws on a lifetime's experience to catch guanacos, which are three times her weight. In the cloud forest, rarely seen Andean bears clamber thirty metres into the canopy to find elusive fruit. Poison dart frogs use ingenious methods to keep their tadpoles safe, whilst green anacondas stalk capuchin monkeys. At Iguazu Falls, great dusky swifts make death-defying flights through one of the biggest waterfalls on Earth.
| 4 | "Australia" | Emma Napper | 17 November 2019 | 8.28 |
Australia, a land cast adrift at the time of the dinosaurs. Isolated for millions of years, the weird and wonderful animals marooned here are like nowhere else on Earth. In its jungles a cassowary—one of the most dangerous birds in the world—stands six feet tall. Inland, kangaroos and wombats brave snowstorms and gum tree forests are filled with never-before-seen predators. In its red desert heart, reptiles drink through their skin and huge flocks of wild budgerigars swirl in search of water. On secret islands, Tasmanian devils roam and offshore, thousands of sharks gather for a rare event.
| 5 | "Europe" | Giles Badger | 24 November 2019 | 8.53 |
Europe—this crowded continent hides the most surprising animals in pockets of wilderness. Above Gibraltar, Europe's only non-human primate, the Barbary macaque lives a life of kidnapping and high drama, whilst in Vienna churchyard-dwelling European hamsters feast on flowers and candle wax left at graves. Come nightfall, mountain villages in Italy's Apennine Mountains are the hunting grounds for the Italian wolf, whilst the rare Iberian lynx lurks in the forests of Spain. On the surface of the River Danube, voracious great white pelicans rob great cormorants for their catches of fish. Deep underground in Slovenia's caves, the olm—a species of salamander once thought to be baby dragons—live for up to a hundred years, while every summer, Hungary's Tisza River is host to a miraculous display of a giant mayfly's fleeting life cycle. On the surface, Europe has been developed beyond recognition, yet human intervention means the Iberian lynx may yet recover; once on the brink of extinction, a combination of nature reserves and captive breeding programs means that 2019 was a highly successful year for the species, which numbers at over 700 individuals, compared to fewer than 200 in 2005.
| 6 | "North America" | Chadden Hunter | 1 December 2019 | 7.95 |
No continent experiences seasonal change as extreme as North America. From tornados that roar across the prairies, to Arctic air sweeping through the humid, southern swamps—this is a land where pioneering animals thrive. In winter, Canada lynxes prowl the snowy Yukon for snowshoe hares, whilst Florida manatees and American alligators seek hot springs to escape the freeze. In the spring, prairie dogs and burrowing owls spend their time looking after their young while remaining wary of American badgers. In the creeks of Tennessee, fish build spectacular underwater pyramids to find a mate. Atlantic tarpons and blacktip sharks are unafraid of human swimmers while hunting grey mullet along Floridian beaches. Fireflies light up the forests during summer nights, greater roadrunners cruise the spectacular deserts of Arizona and polar bears on the shores of Hudson Bay have learned an ingenious new method to keep up with warmer summers, in which they leap from rocks to hunt beluga whales.
| 7 | "Africa" | Giles Badger | 8 December 2019 | 7.68 |
Africa—home to the greatest wildlife gatherings on Earth, but even in this land of plenty, wildlife faces huge challenges. In the jungles, young chimpanzees learn to use tools to find food. On the savannah, a group of cheetah brothers team up to hunt a topi twice their size. And, in crystal clear freshwater lakes, caring cichlid mothers are tricked by cuckoo catfish. Africa's deserts are tough too. In the Namib, brown hyenas make long treks to find food on the beach, whilst in the Kalahari Desert, the bizarre aardvark digs deep to find a meal. But for much of Africa's wildlife the greatest threat comes from humans.
| 8 | "Continents of Wonder" | --- | 8 December 2019 | 7.68 |
The most spectacular moments selected from the series

"Today, scientists tell us that we are at the start of a mass extinction, and one that is being caused by human activity. Over a million species could be wiped out, many within the next few decades. But, with help, even the most vulnerable wildlife populations can still recover... So we can improve things, if we determine to do so. This is a crucial moment in time. The decisions we take now will influence the future of animals, humanity, and indeed all life on Earth."

— David Attenborough, in closing
