= Tritonia pallida =

Tritonia pallida may refer to:

- Tritonia pallida (plant), a species of plant in the family Iridaceae
- Tritonia pallida (gastropod), a species of nudibranch in the family Tritoniidae
