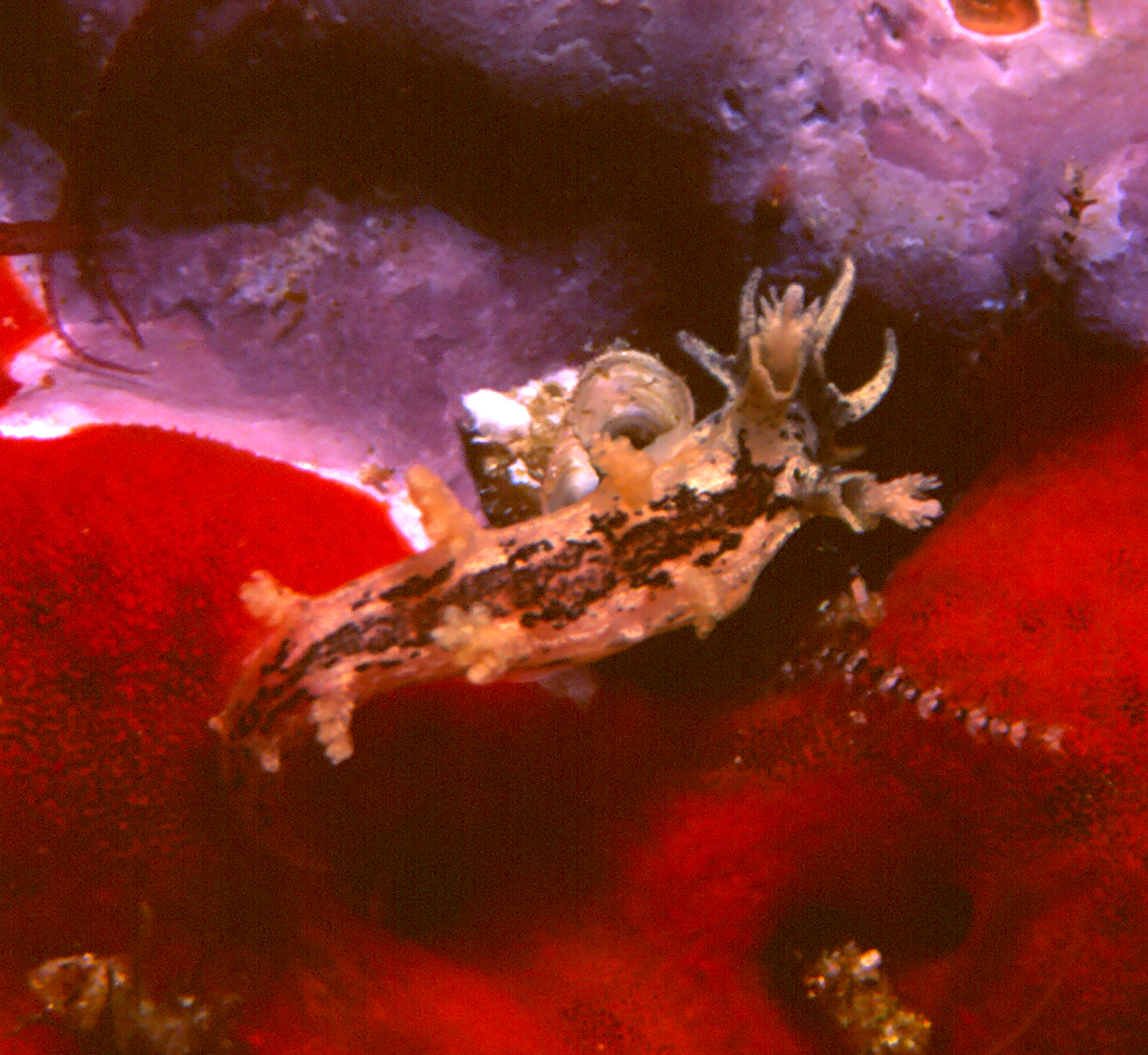
- Duvaucelia manicata

Scientific classification
- Kingdom: Animalia
- Phylum: Mollusca
- Class: Gastropoda
- Order: Nudibranchia
- Suborder: Tritoniacea
- Family: Tritoniidae
- Genus: Duvaucelia; Risso, 1826

Species
- See text

= Duvaucelia =

Genus of gastropods

Duvaucelia is a genus of sea slugs, nudibranchs, shell-less marine gastropod molluscs in the family Tritoniidae. It was synonymised with Tritonia until 2020 when a revision of the family Tritoniidae brought it back into use. A 2023 analysis later established it as a synonym of Candiella.

== Species ==
Species within the genus Duvaucelia include:

- Duvaucelia lineata (Alder & Hancock, 1848)
- Duvaucelia manicata (Deshayes, 1853)
- Duvaucelia odhneri J. Tardy, 1963 (=Tritonia nilsodhneri Ev. Marcus, 1983
- Duvaucelia plebeia (G. Johnston, 1828)
- Duvaucelia striata (Haefelfinger, 1963)
- Duvaucelia taliartensis (Ortea & Moro, 2009)
