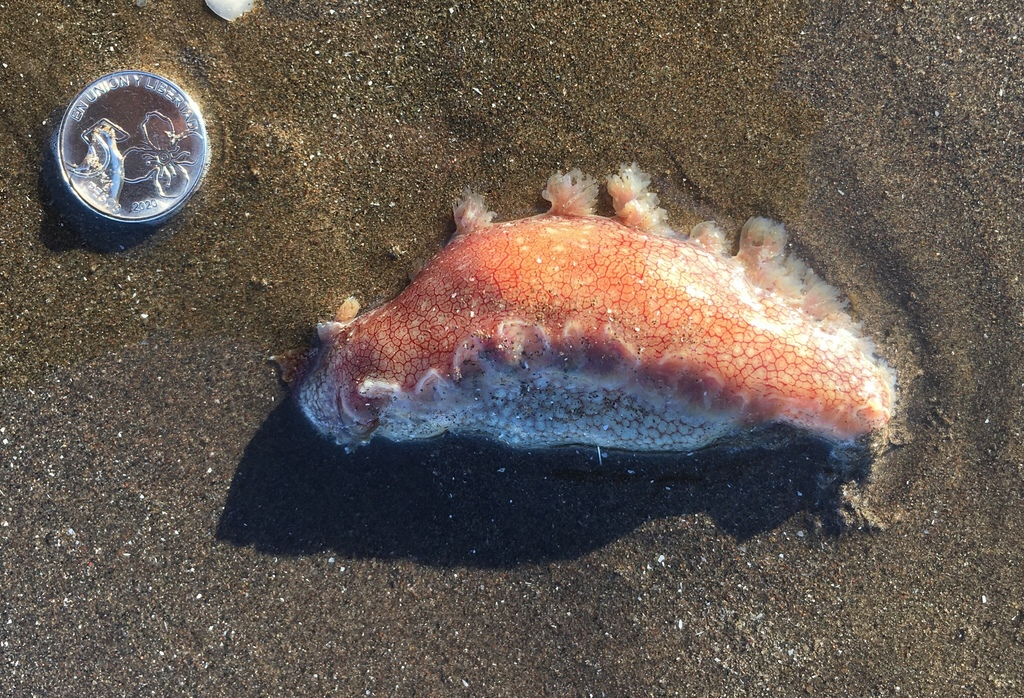

Scientific classification
- Kingdom: Animalia
- Phylum: Mollusca
- Class: Gastropoda
- Order: Nudibranchia
- Suborder: Tritoniacea
- Family: Tritoniidae
- Genus: Marionia
- Species: M. cucullata

Binomial name
- Marionia cucullata (Couthouy, 1852)

Synonyms
- Tritonia cucullata Couthouy in Gould, 1852

= Marionia cucullata =

Species of gastropod

Marionia cucullata is a species of dendronotid nudibranch. It is a marine gastropod mollusc in the family Tritoniidae. It is mostly found of the coast of South America.
