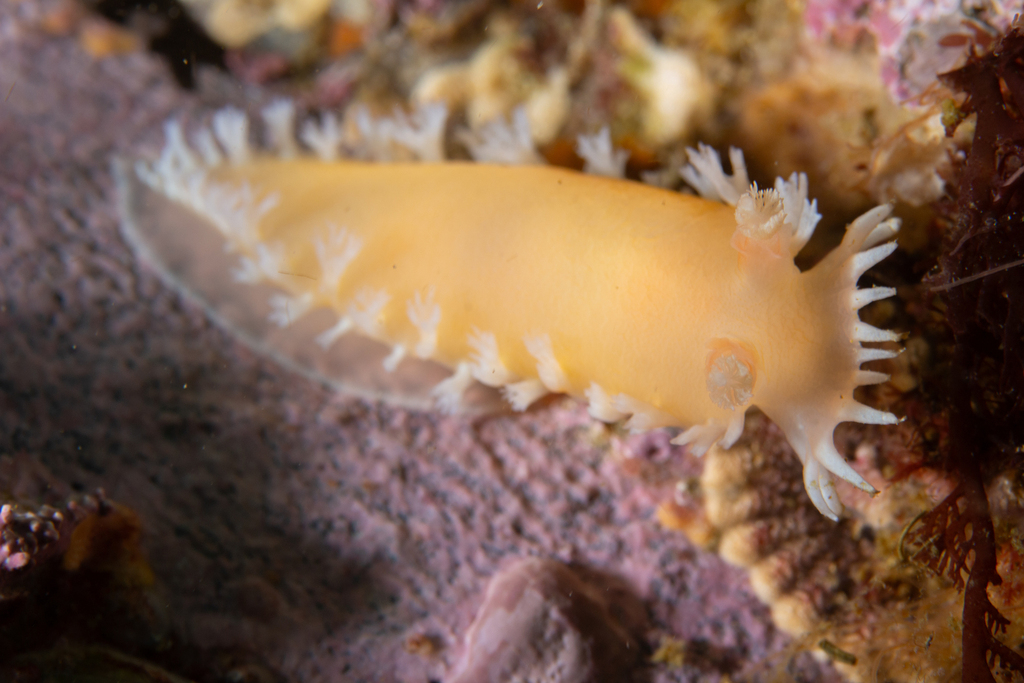

Scientific classification
- Kingdom: Animalia
- Phylum: Mollusca
- Class: Gastropoda
- Order: Nudibranchia
- Suborder: Tritoniacea
- Family: Tritoniidae
- Genus: Tritonia
- Species: T. challengeriana

Binomial name
- Tritonia challengeriana (Bergh, 1884)

Synonyms
- Marionia cucullata auct. non Gould, 1852; Tritonia challengeriana Bergh, 1884; Duvaucelia challengeriana auct. non Bergh, 1884; Duvaucelia poirieri auct. non Mabille & Rochebrune, 1889; Necromantes appendiculata (Eliot, 1905); Duvaucelia appendiculata (Eliot, 1905); Tritonia appendiculata Eliot, 1905

= Tritonia challengeriana =

Species of gastropod

Tritonia challengeriana is a species of dendronotid nudibranch. It is a marine gastropod mollusc in the family Tritoniidae.

== Distribution ==
It is found in Antarctica, the southern tip of Chile and Argentina, South Georgia and the South Sandwich Islands, and the Falkland Islands.
