= Paratritonia =

Scientific classification
- Kingdom: Animalia
- Phylum: Mollusca
- Class: Gastropoda
- Order: Nudibranchia
- Suborder: Tritoniacea
- Superfamily: Tritonioidea
- Family: Tritoniidae
- Genus: Paratritonia; Baba, 1949
- Species: P. lutea

Binomial name
- Paratritonia lutea Baba, 1949

Genus of gastropods

Paratritonia is a genus of sea slugs, specifically dendronotid nudibranchs. It is a marine gastropod mollusc in the family Tritoniidae.

A monotypic genus, the only species is Paratritonia lutea.

== Distribution ==
Paratritonia lutea was found in Japan.
