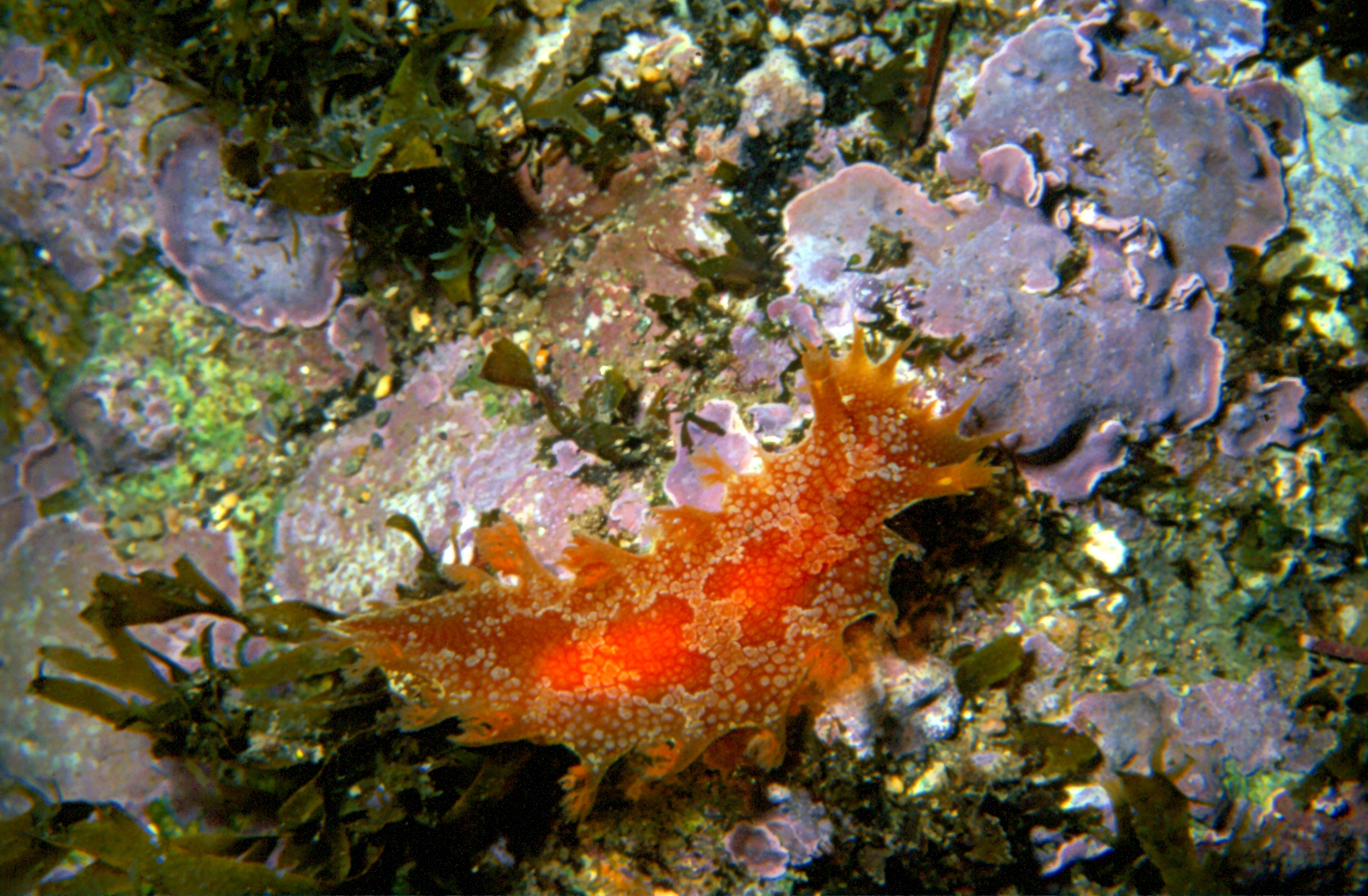

Scientific classification
- Kingdom: Animalia
- Phylum: Mollusca
- Class: Gastropoda
- Order: Nudibranchia
- Suborder: Tritoniacea
- Family: Tritoniidae
- Genus: Marionia
- Species: M. blainvillea

Binomial name
- Marionia blainvillea (Risso, 1818)

Synonyms
- Duvaucelia gracilis Risso, 1826; Marionia affinis Bergh, 1883; Marionia berghii Vayssière, 1879; Marionia tethydea (misspelling); Tritonia acuminata A. Costa, 1840; Tritonia blainvillea Risso, 1818; Tritonia costae (Vérany, 1846); Tritonia decaphylla Cantraine, 1835; Tritonia meyeri (Vérany, 1862); Tritonia quadrilatera R. A. Philippi, 1844; Tritonia thethydea Delle Chiaje, 1841

= Marionia blainvillea =

Species of gastropod

Marionia blainvillea is a species of sea slug, a dendronotid nudibranch, a marine gastropod mollusc in the family Tritoniidae.

== Distribution ==
This species was described from the Mediterranean Sea. It is reported from the Atlantic Ocean as far north as the Bay of Biscay.

Juveniles of the species are white, as shown below.

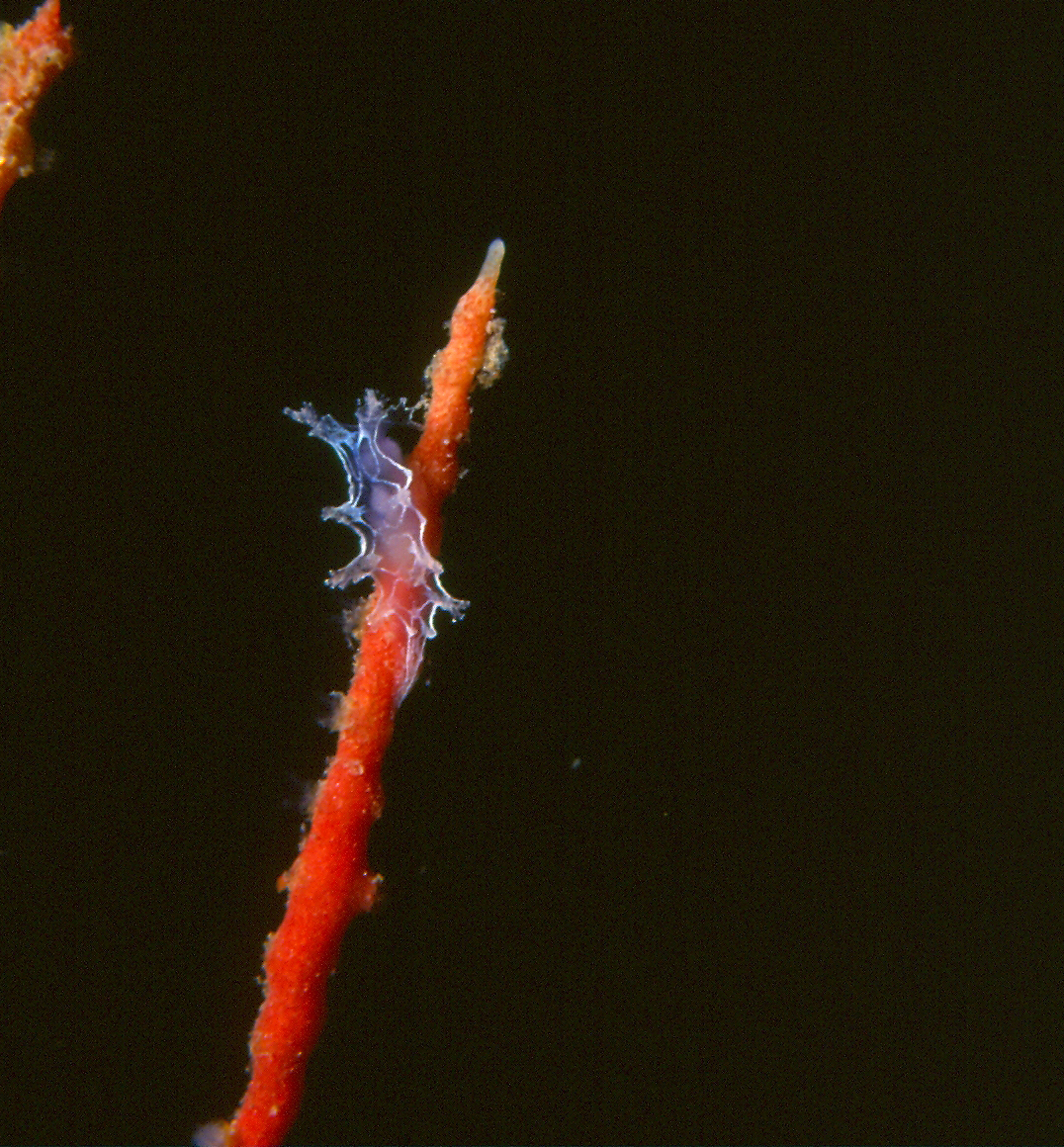
Photo of a juvenile.

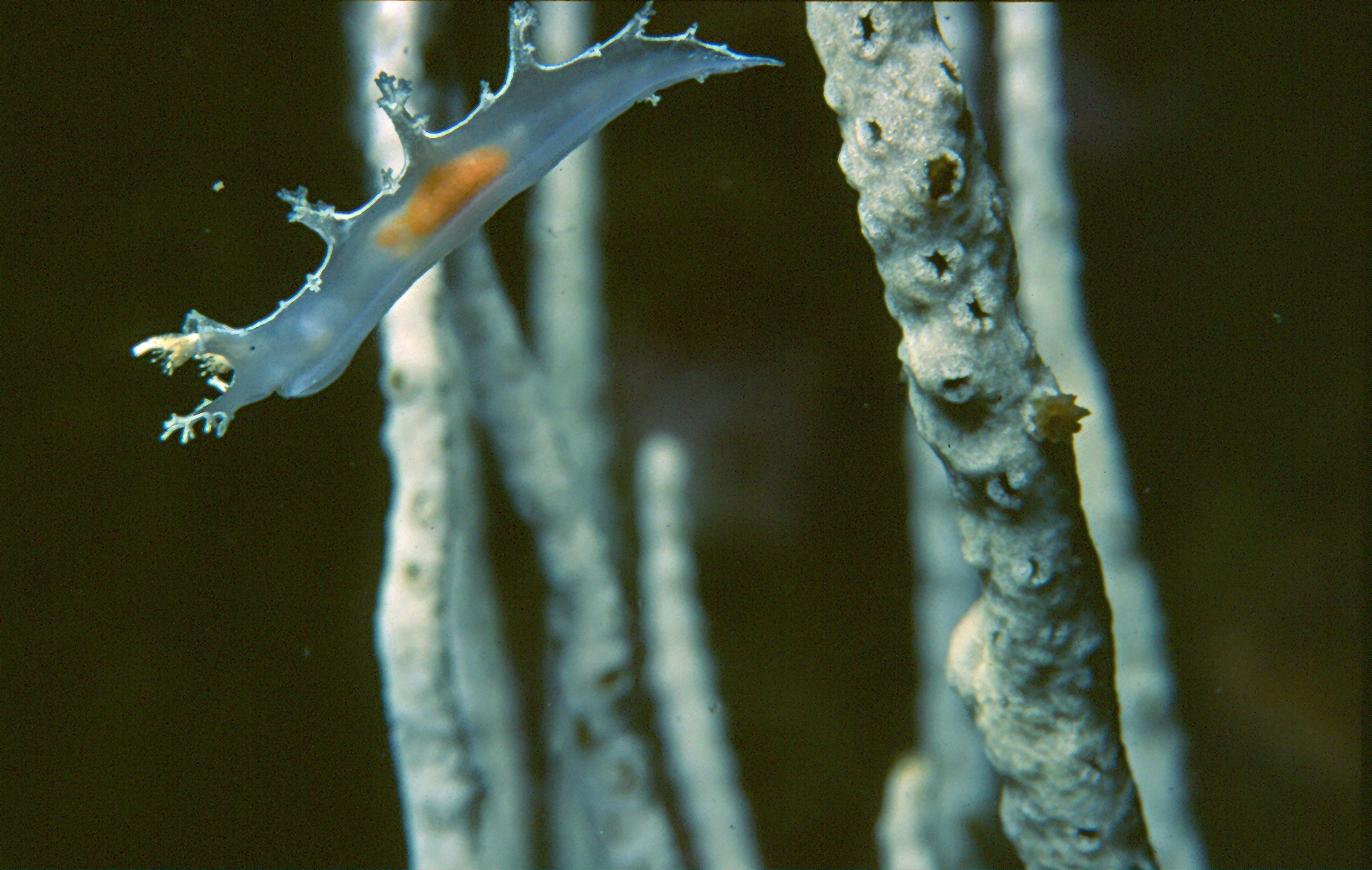
Photo of a juvenile.
