= Tritonidoxa =

Tritonidoxa capensis

Scientific classification
- Kingdom: Animalia
- Phylum: Mollusca
- Class: Gastropoda
- Order: Nudibranchia
- Suborder: Tritoniacea
- Family: Tritoniidae
- Genus: Tritonidoxa; Bergh, 1908
- Species: T. capensis

Binomial name
- Tritonidoxa capensis Bergh, 1908

Synonyms
- (Genus): Duvaucelia (Tritonidoxa) Bergh, 1907; (Species): Duvaucelia (Tritonidoxa) capensis (Bergh, 1907)

Genus of gastropods

Tritonidoxa is a genus of sea slugs, specifically dendronotid nudibranchs. It is a marine gastropod mollusc in the family Tritoniidae.

== Species ==
A monotypic genus, the only species is Tritonidoxa capensis.

Species brought into synonymy

- Tritonidoxa wellsi (Er. Marcus, 1961); synonym of Tritonicula wellsi (Er. Marcus, 1961)

== Distribution ==
Tritonidoxa capensis was found in South Africa.
