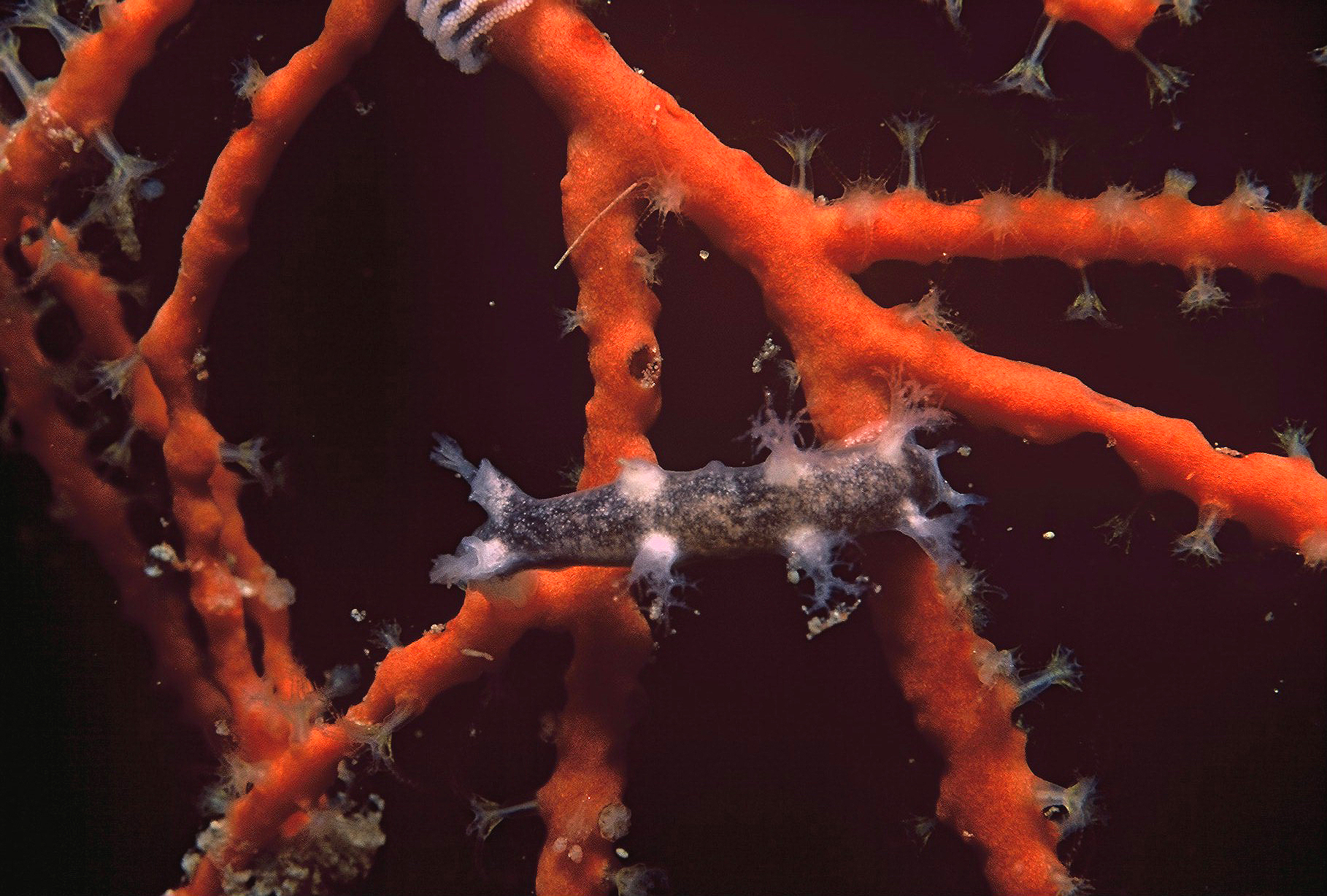

Scientific classification
- Kingdom: Animalia
- Phylum: Mollusca
- Class: Gastropoda
- Order: Nudibranchia
- Suborder: Tritoniacea
- Family: Tritoniidae
- Genus: Duvaucelia
- Species: D. plebeia

Binomial name
- Duvaucelia plebeia (Johnston, 1828)

Synonyms
- Tritonia plebeia Johnston, 1828; Candiella plebeia (Johnston, 1828); Tritonia pulchra Johnston, 1828; Sphaerostoma aurantiacum Barnard, 1927

= Duvaucelia plebeia =

Species of gastropod

Duvaucelia plebeia, common name the European nudibranch, is a species of sea slug, a nudibranch, a marine gastropod mollusk in the family Tritoniidae.

== Description ==
The color is primarily yellow, with brown mottling. The length of this nudibranch is up to 30 mm.

== Distribution ==
The indigenous distribution of Duvaucelia plebeia is the Northeastern Atlantic Ocean from Norway to Portugal.

The species has been introduced in coastal areas of Maine and Massachusetts, probably in ballast water from ships.

== Ecology ==
=== Habitat ===
This is a marine species.

=== Feeding habits ===
Although this species was introduced in the Gulf of Maine only during the mid-1980s, it has had a severe impact on the soft coral, Alcyonium siderium.
