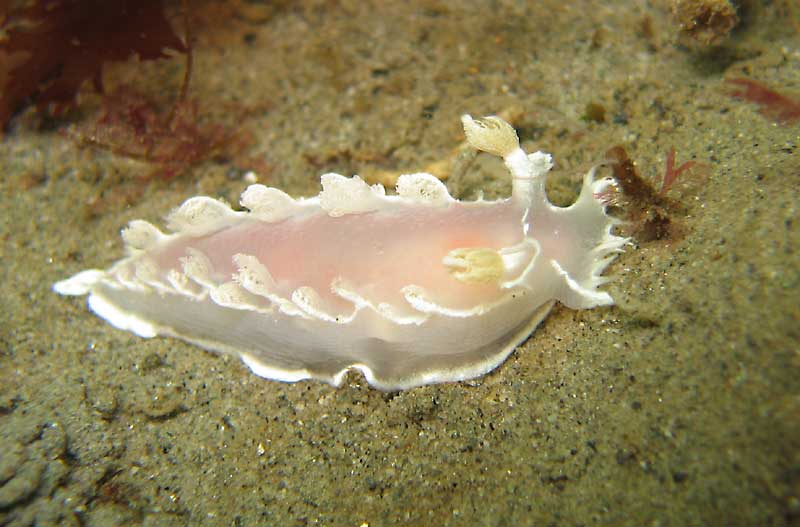
- A live individual of Tritonia festiva in situ, head end towards the right

Scientific classification
- Kingdom: Animalia
- Phylum: Mollusca
- Class: Gastropoda
- Order: Nudibranchia
- Suborder: Tritoniacea
- Family: Tritoniidae
- Genus: Tritonia
- Species: T. festiva

Binomial name
- Tritonia festiva (Stearns, 1873)

= Diamondback tritonia =

Species of gastropod

The diamondback tritonia (Tritonia festiva) is a species of nudibranch, a marine gastropod mollusk in the family Tritoniidae. It is an opportunistic predator of other marine invertebrates.

== Classification ==
The diamondback tritonia is classified within the Mollusca phylum, the Gastropoda class, the Nudibranchia order, the Tritotoniidae family, and the Tritonia genus. This species was first described as Lateribranchiaea festiva (Stearns, 1873).

== Distribution ==
The diamondback tritonia inhabits the waters of the Pacific Ocean. Sightings have been most prevalent on the west coast of North America and have been reported as far north as Alaska. The species has also been identified along the coast of Japan and both North and South Korea.

== Habitat ==
The diamondback tritonia is a benthic organism as the sea floor is where this species finds its prey. Their flattened body plan allows for maneuverability into small spaces common in rocky intertidal areas.

== Body plan ==
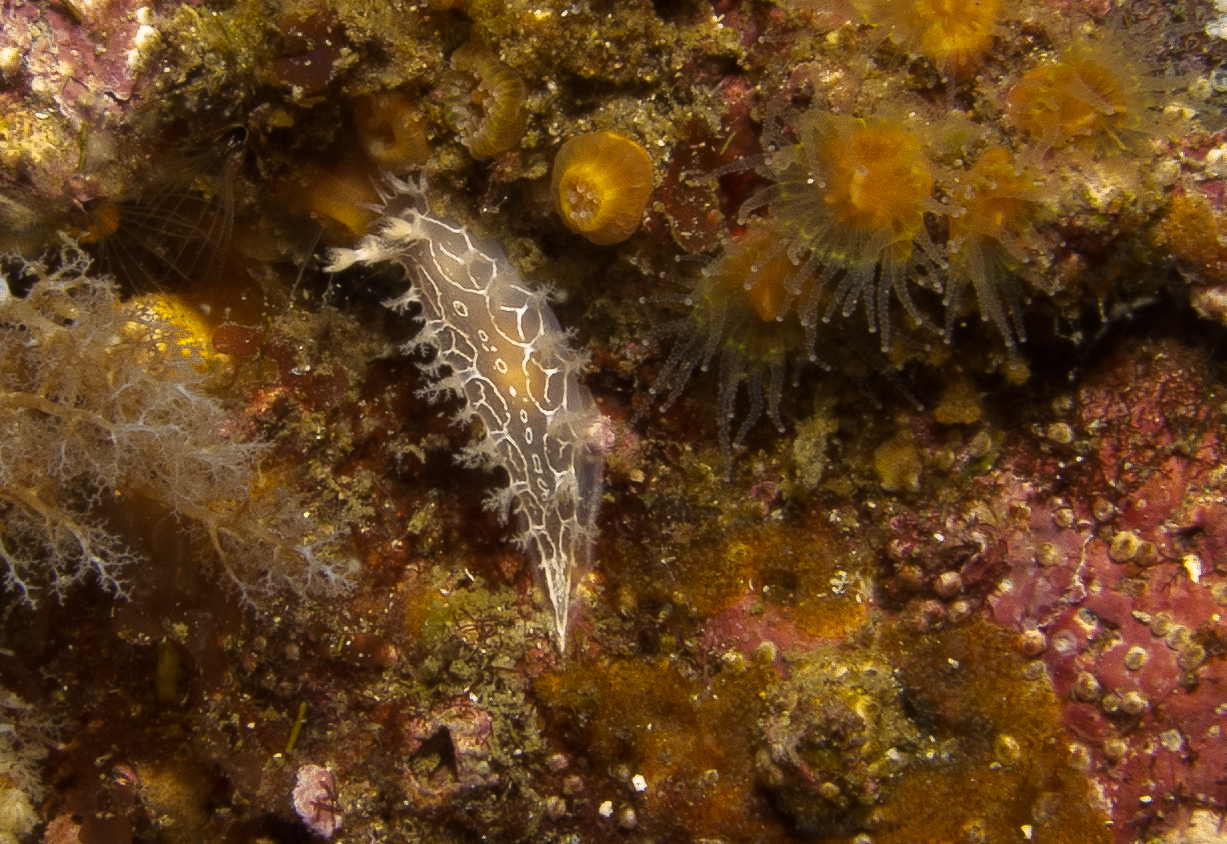
Intricate pattern along the back of a diamondback tritonia

The basic structure of all nudibranchs consists of a soft body that lacks a shell. Nudibranchs are bilaterally symmetrical and oblong in shape as they are dorsoventrally flattened. However, from species to species, there is a great range of characteristics differentiating each species from one another. In the case of the diamondback tritonia, these nudibranchs are typically light pink, orange or white in color and have an intricate pattern along their back. This pattern can vary amongst individuals. They also possess a vestigial girdle of chitinous ridges that separates them from other nudibranch species.

== Feeding ==
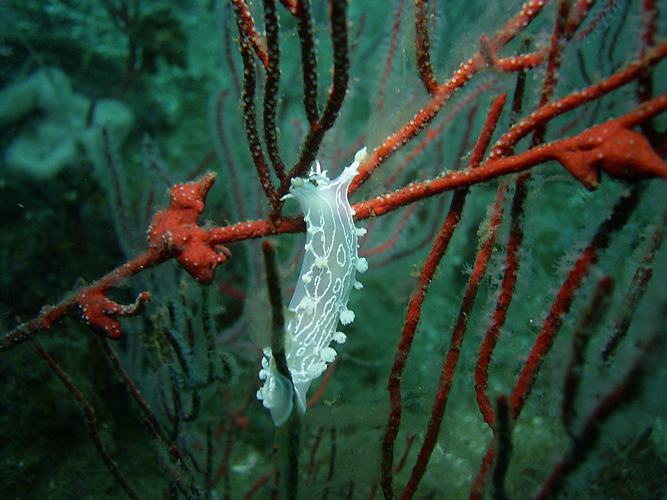
Diamondback tritonia feeding on a sea whip

The diamondback tritonia preys on soft corals including sea pens, sea pansies, and sea whips. They feed on the young of these organisms as they are smaller and easier to consume. More specifically, the diamondback tritonia is the only known predator to the polyps of Discophyton rudyi, which are small, colony-forming soft corals found on the rocky shores of the Northeast Pacific Ocean. Diamondback tritonias feed on these varying prey by using their digitate frontal veil to locate and attack them before the polyps can contract into a state of protection.

== Reproduction and mating ==
This species is simultaneously hermaphroditic, meaning that they produce both eggs and sperm. Mating occurs as both individuals try to penetrate one another. The first to succeed is deemed the dominant male and the other individual deposits the fertilized eggs on a substratum to develop.

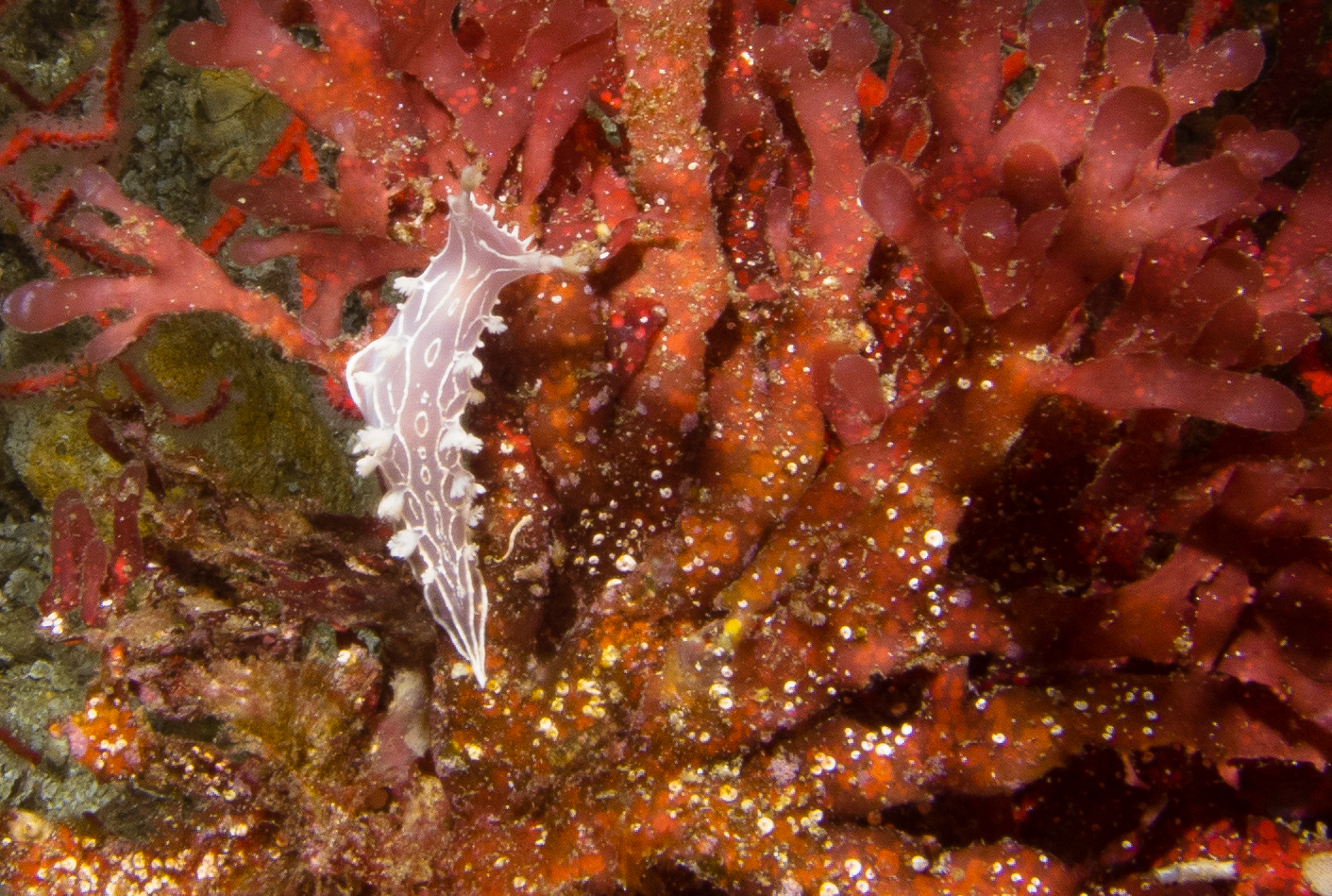
Tritonia festiva, offshore Santa Cruz Island, Channel Islands National Marine Sanctuary
