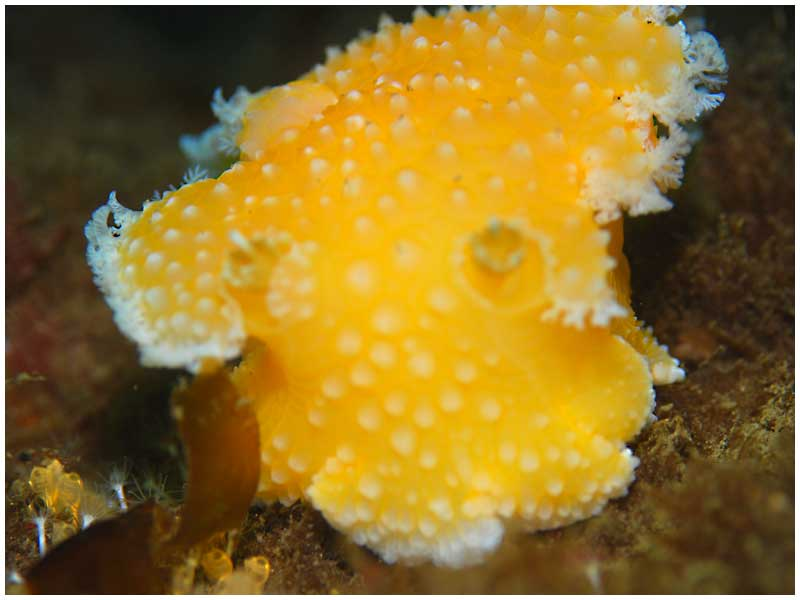
- A live individual of Tochuina gigantea, in situ, head end towards the camera

Scientific classification
- Kingdom: Animalia
- Phylum: Mollusca
- Class: Gastropoda
- Order: Nudibranchia
- Suborder: Tritoniacea
- Family: Tritoniidae
- Genus: Tochuina
- Species: T. gigantea

Binomial name
- Tochuina gigantea Bergh, 1904

Synonyms
- Tritonia gigantea Bergh, 1904 (original combination); Tritonia tetraquetra (Pallas, 1788) sensu Bergh, 1879

= Tochuina gigantea =

Species of gastropod

Tochuina gigantea, common name the giant orange tochui, is a species of sea slug, a tritonid nudibranch, a marine gastropod mollusk in the family Tritoniidae.

Bergh (1879) used the name Tritonia tetraquetra in a sense different from Pallas (1788). The valid name for Tochuina tetraquetra sensu Bergh, 1879 is Tritonia gigantea Bergh, 1904. The complicated series of misinterpretations of Pallas' and Bergh's species are explained in a 2020 revision of the family Tritoniidae.
