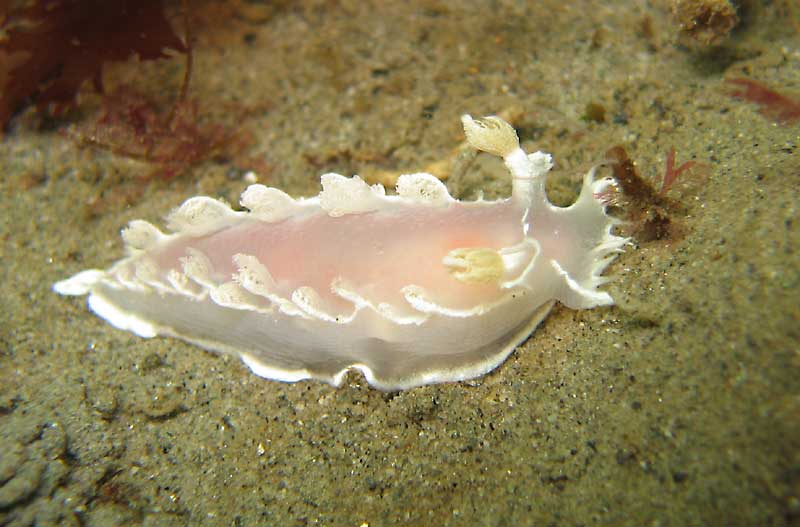
- A live individual of Tritonia festiva in situ, head end towards the right

Scientific classification
- Domain: Eukaryota
- Kingdom: Animalia
- Phylum: Mollusca
- Class: Gastropoda
- Order: Nudibranchia
- Suborder: Cladobranchia
- Family: Tritoniidae
- Subfamily: Tritoniinae
- Genus: Tritonia; Cuvier, 1798

Species
- See text

Synonyms
- Candiella Gray, 1850; Euphurus Rafinesque, 1815 (Unnecessary substitute name for Tritonia); Microlophus Mabille & Rochebrune, 1889 (Invalid: junior homonym of Microlophus Duméril & Bibron, 1837 [Reptilia]; Myrella is a replacement name); Myrella Odhner, 1963

= Tritonia (gastropod) =

Genus of gastropods

Tritonia is a genus of sea slugs, nudibranchs, shell-less marine gastropod molluscs in the family Tritoniidae.

Tritonia is the type genus of the family Tritoniidae.

== Species ==
Species within the genus Tritonia include:

- The type species is Tritonia hombergii Cuvier, 1803
- Tritonia antarctica Pfeffer in Martens & Pfeffer, 1886
- Tritonia australis (Bergh, 1898)
- Tritonia bollandi Smith & Gosliner, 2003
- Tritonia callogorgiae Chimienti, Furfaro & Taviani, 2020
- Tritonia challengeriana Bergh, 1884 - synonyms:Tritonia appendiculata (Eliot, 1905)
- Tritonia coralliumrubri Doneddu, Sacco & Trainito, 2014
- Tritonia dantarti Ballesteros & Avila 2006
- Tritonia episcopalis Bouchet, 1977
- Tritonia exsulans Bergh, 1894
- Tritonia festiva (Stearns, 1873)
- Tritonia flemingi (Powell, 1937)
- Tritonia griegi Odhner, 1922
- Tritonia hirondelle Ortea & Moro, 2020
- Tritonia hombergii Cuvier, 1803
- Tritonia incerta Bergh, 1904
- Tritonia indecora Bergh, 1907
- Tritonia ingolfiana (Bergh, 1899)
- Tritonia newfoundlandica Valdés, Murillo, McCarthy & Yedinak, 2017
- Tritonia odhneri Er. Marcus, 1959
- Tritonia olivacea Bergh, 1905
- Tritonia pallescens Eliot, 1906
- Tritonia pallida Stimpson, 1855
- Tritonia poirieri (Mabille & Rochebrune, 1891)
- Tritonia peregrina (Lamarck, 1819)
- Tritonia primorjensis Minichev, 1971
- Tritonia psoloides (Aurivillius, 1887)
- Tritonia punctata (Dalyell, 1853)
- Tritonia sp. 1 soft coral nudibranch
- Tritonia sp. 2 brush nudibranch
- Tritonia rubiginosa (Reeve, 1846)
- Tritonia tetraquetra (Pallas, 1788)
- Tritonia villafranca (Vayssière, 1901)
- Tritonia vorax (Odhner, 1926)

Synonyms:

- Tritonia acuminata Costa A., 1840: synonym of Marionia blainvillea (Risso, 1818)
- Tritonia alba Alder & Hancock, 1854: synonym of Tritonia hombergii Cuvier, 1803
- Tritonia appendiculata Eliot, 1905: synonym of Tritonia challengeriana Bergh, 1884
- Tritonia ascanii Møller, 1842: synonym of Dendronotus frondosus (Ascanius, 1774)
- Tritonia atrofusca MacGillivray, 1843: synonym of Tritonia hombergii Cuvier, 1803
- Tritonia aurantiaca (Barnard, 1927): accepted as Duvaucelia plebeia (G. Johnston, 1828)
- Tritonia aurantiacum [sic]: synonym of Tritonia aurantiaca (Barnard, 1927) accepted as Tritonia plebeia G. Johnston, 1828
- Tritonia bayeri Ev. Marcus & Er. Marcus, 1967: synonym of Tritonicula bayeri (Ev. Marcus & Er. Marcus, 1967)
- Tritonia blainvillea Risso, 1818: synonym of Marionia blainvillea (Risso, 1818)
- Tritonia cincta Pruvot-Fol, 1937: synonym of Tritoniopsis cincta (Pruvot-Fol, 1937)
- Tritonia conifera Dalyell, 1853: synonym of Tritonia hombergii Cuvier, 1803 (dubious synonym)
- Tritonia costae Vérany, 1846: synonym of Marionia blainvillea (Risso, 1818)
- Tritonia cucullata Couthouy in Gould, 1852: synonym of Marionia cucullata (Couthouy, 1852) (original combination)
- Tritonia cyanobranchiata Rüppell & Leuckart, 1828: synonym of Marionia cyanobranchiata (Rüppell & Leuckart, 1828) (original combination)
- Tritonia decaphylla Cantraine, 1835: synonym of Marionia blainvillea (Risso, 1818)
- Tritonia diomedea Bergh, 1894: synonym of Tritonia tetraquetra (Pallas, 1788)
- Tritonia divaricata Dalyell, 1853: synonym of Tritonia hombergii Cuvier, 1803
- Tritonia elegans Audouin, 1826: synonym of Tritoniopsis elegans (Audouin, 1826) (original combination)
- Tritonia eriosi Ev. Marcus, 1983: synonym of Tritonia odhneri Er. Marcus, 1959
- Tritonia felina Alder & Hancock, 1842: synonym of Dendronotus frondosus (Ascanius, 1774)
- Tritonia gibbosa Risso, 1818: synonym of Ancula gibbosa (Risso, 1818) (original combination)
- Tritonia gigantea Bergh, 1904: synonym of Tochuina gigantea (Bergh, 1904) (original combination)
- Tritonia glama Rüppell & Leuckart, 1828: synonym of Marionia glama (Rüppell & Leuckart, 1828) (original combination)
- Tritonia gracilis (Risso, 1826): synonym of Duvaucelia manicata Deshayes, 1853
- Tritonia hamnerorum Gosliner & Ghiselin, 1987: synonym of Tritonicula hamnerorum (Gosliner & Ghiselin, 1987)
- Tritonia hombergi [sic]: synonym of Tritonia hombergii Cuvier, 1803 (misspelling)
- Tritonia khaleesi F. V. Silva, Azevedo & Matthews-Cascon, 2014: synonym of Marianina khaleesi (Silva, de Azevedo et Matthews-Cascon, 2014)
- Tritonia lactea W. Thompson, 1840: synonym of Dendronotus lacteus (W. Thompson, 1840) (original combination)
- Tritonia lineata Alder & Hancock, 1848: synonym of Duvaucelia lineata (Alder & Hancock, 1848)
- Tritonia manicata Deshayes, 1853: synonym of Duvaucelia manicata (Deshayes, 1853)
- Tritonia meyeri Vérany, 1862: synonym of Marionia blainvillea (Risso, 1818)
- Tritonia moesta Bergh, 1884: synonym of Duvaucelia manicata Deshayes, 1853
- Tritonia myrakeenae Bertsch & Mozqueira, 1986: synonym of Tritonicula myrakeenae (Bertsch & Osuna, 1986)
- Tritonia nigritigris Valdés, Lundsten & N. G. Wilson, 2018: synonym of Tochuina nigritigris (Valdés, Lundsten & Wilson, 2018)
- Tritonia nigromaculata Roginskaya, 1984: synonym of Tochuina nigromaculata (Roginskaya, 1984)
- Tritonia nilsodhneri Marcus Ev., 1983: synonym of Duvaucelia odhneri J. Tardy, 1963
- Tritonia papalotla Bertsch, Valdés & Gosliner, 2009: synonym of Trivettea papalotla (Bertsch, Valdés & Gosliner, 2009) (original combination)
- Tritonia pickensi Ev. Marcus & Er. Marcus, 1967: synonym of Tritonicula pickensi (Ev. Marcus & Er. Marcus, 1967)
- Tritonia plebeia G. Johnston, 1828: synonym of Duvaucelia plebeia (G. Johnston, 1828)
- Tritonia pulchella Alder & Hancock, 1842: synonym of Dendronotus frondosus (Ascanius, 1774)
- Tritonia pulchra G. Johnston, 1828: synonym of Duvaucelia plebeia (G. Johnston, 1828)
- Tritonia pustulosa Deshayes, 1853: synonym of Tritonia hombergii Cuvier, 1803
- Tritonia quadrilatera Philippi, 1844: synonym of Marionia blainvillea (Risso, 1818)
- Tritonia reticulata Bergh, 1882: synonym of Tritonia festiva (Stearns, 1873)
- Tritonia reynoldsii Couthouy, 1838: synonym of Dendronotus frondosus (Ascanius, 1774) (dubious synonym)
- Tritonia rubra Rüppell & Leuckart, 1828: synonym of Marionia rubra (Rüppell & Leuckart, 1828) (original combination)
- Tritonia striata Haefelfinger, 1963: synonym of Duvaucelia striata (Haefelfinger, 1963)
- Tritonia taliartensis Ortea & Moro, 2009: synonym of Duvaucelia taliartensis (Ortea & Moro, 2009)
- Tritonia tetraquetra (Pallas, 1788) sensu Bergh, 1879: synonym of Tochuina gigantea (Bergh, 1904)
- Tritonia thethydea Delle Chiaje, 1841: synonym of Marionia blainvillea (Risso, 1818)
- Tritonia varicosa W. Turton, 1825: synonym of Tritia varicosa (W. Turton, 1825) (original combination)
- Tritonia wellsi Er. Marcus, 1961: synonym of Tritonicula wellsi (Er. Marcus, 1961)
