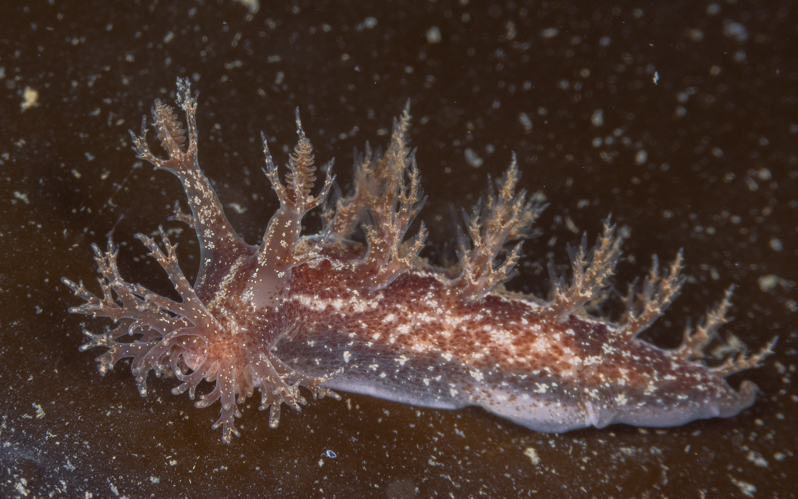
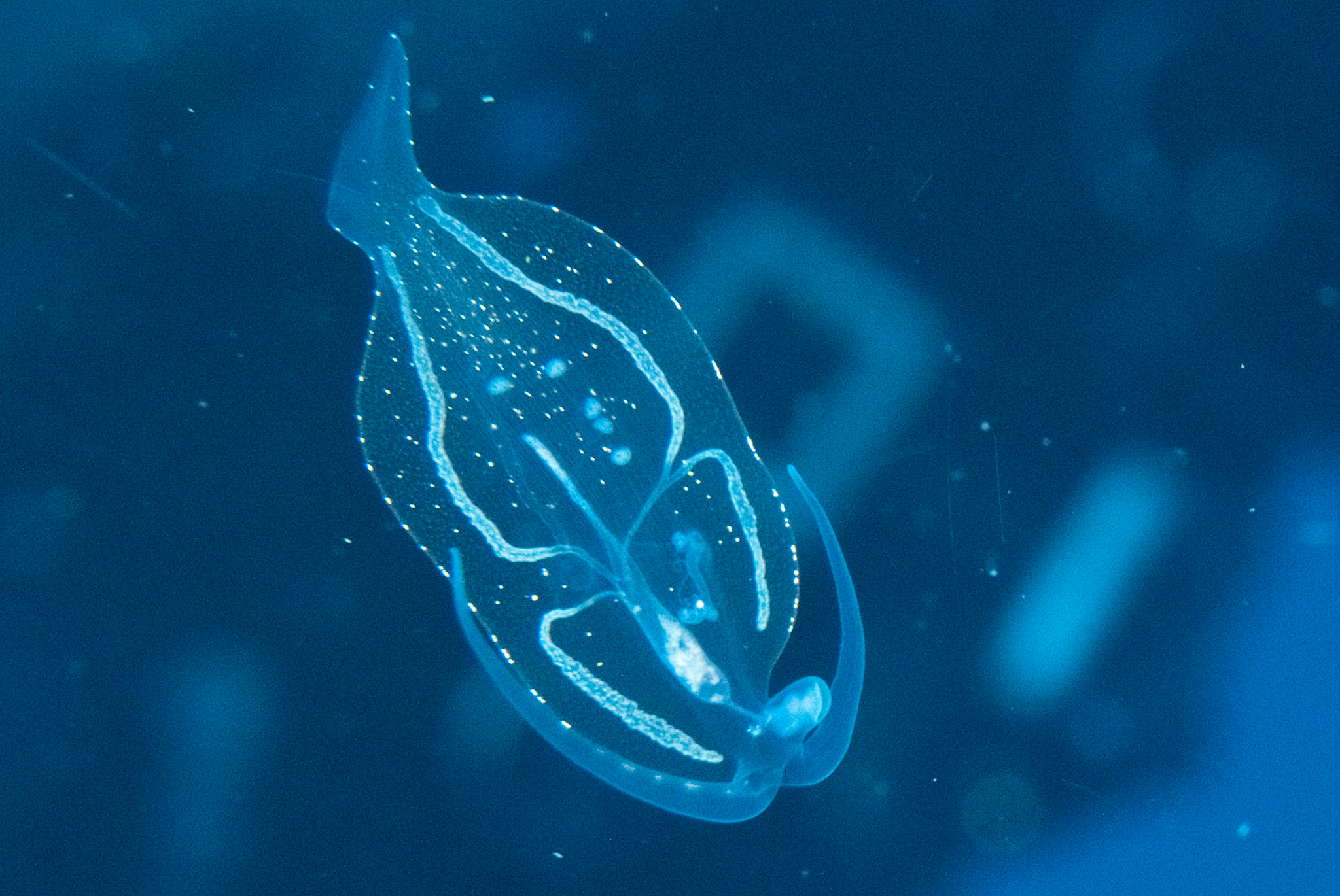
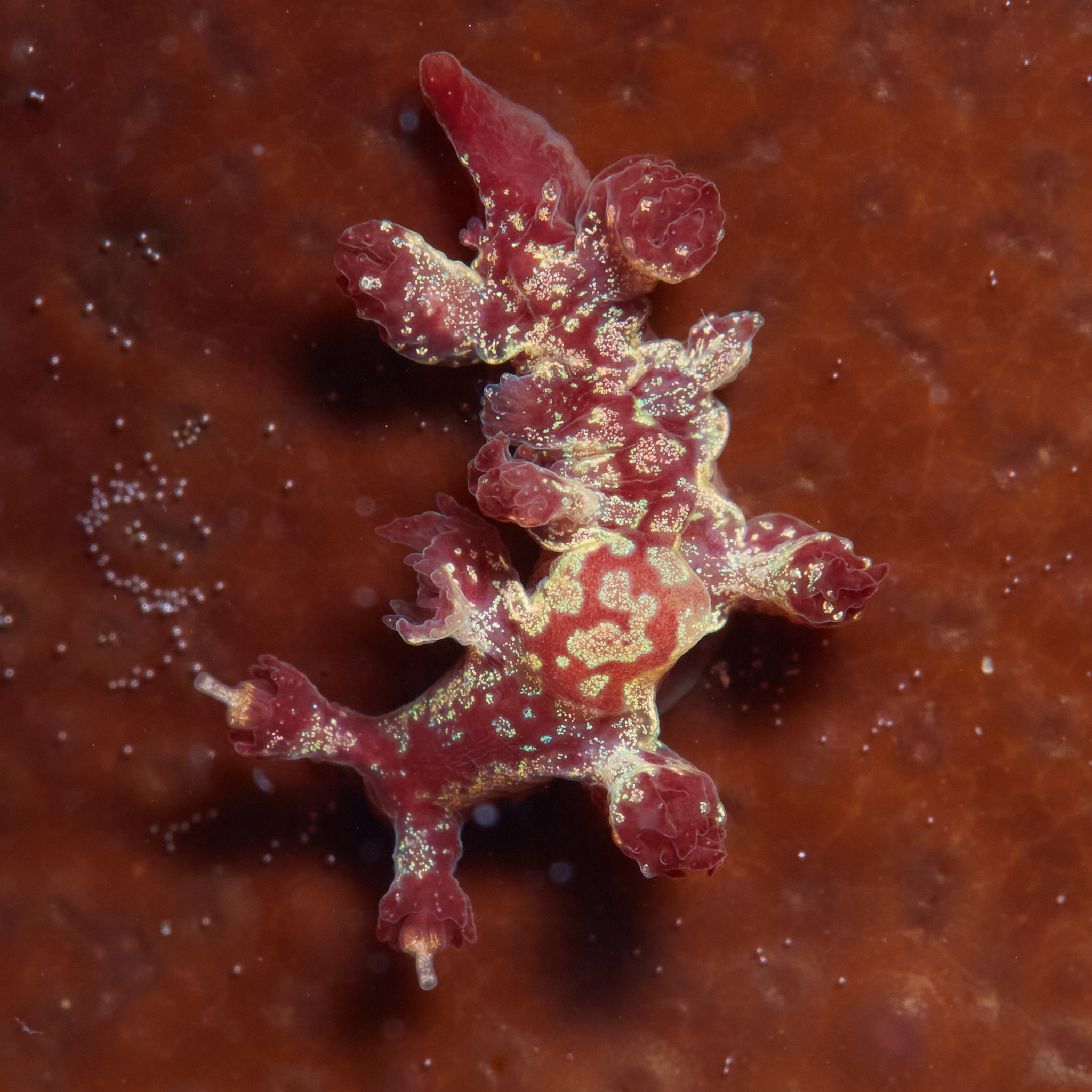
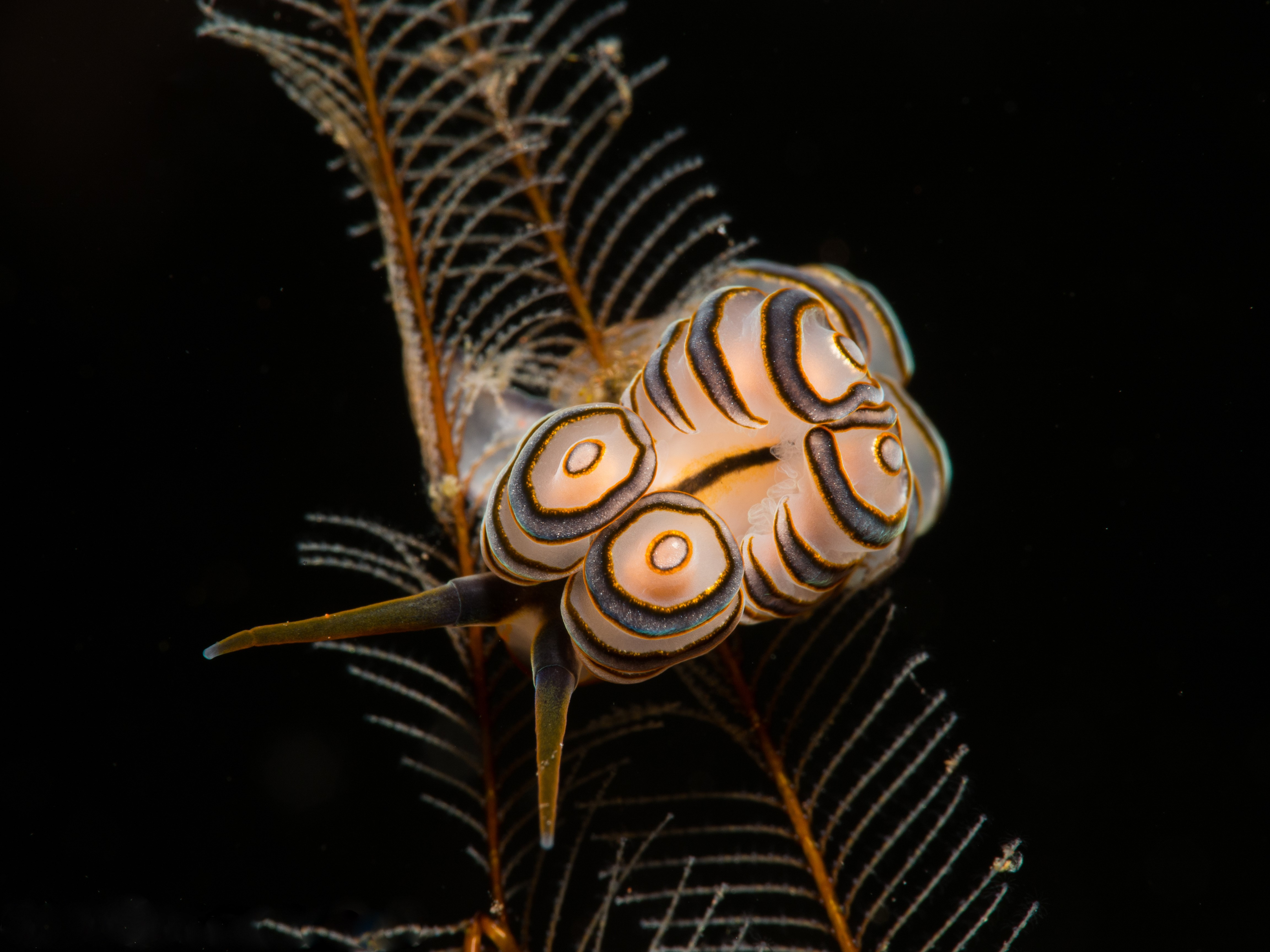
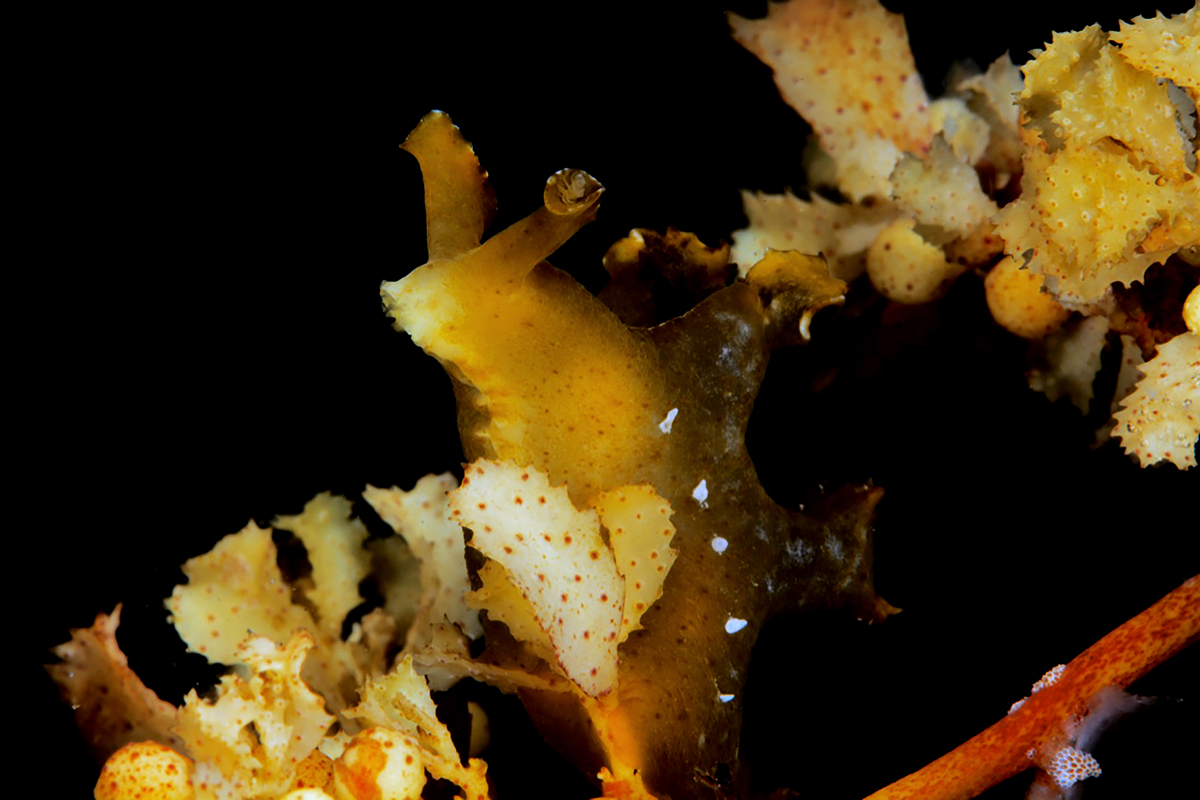
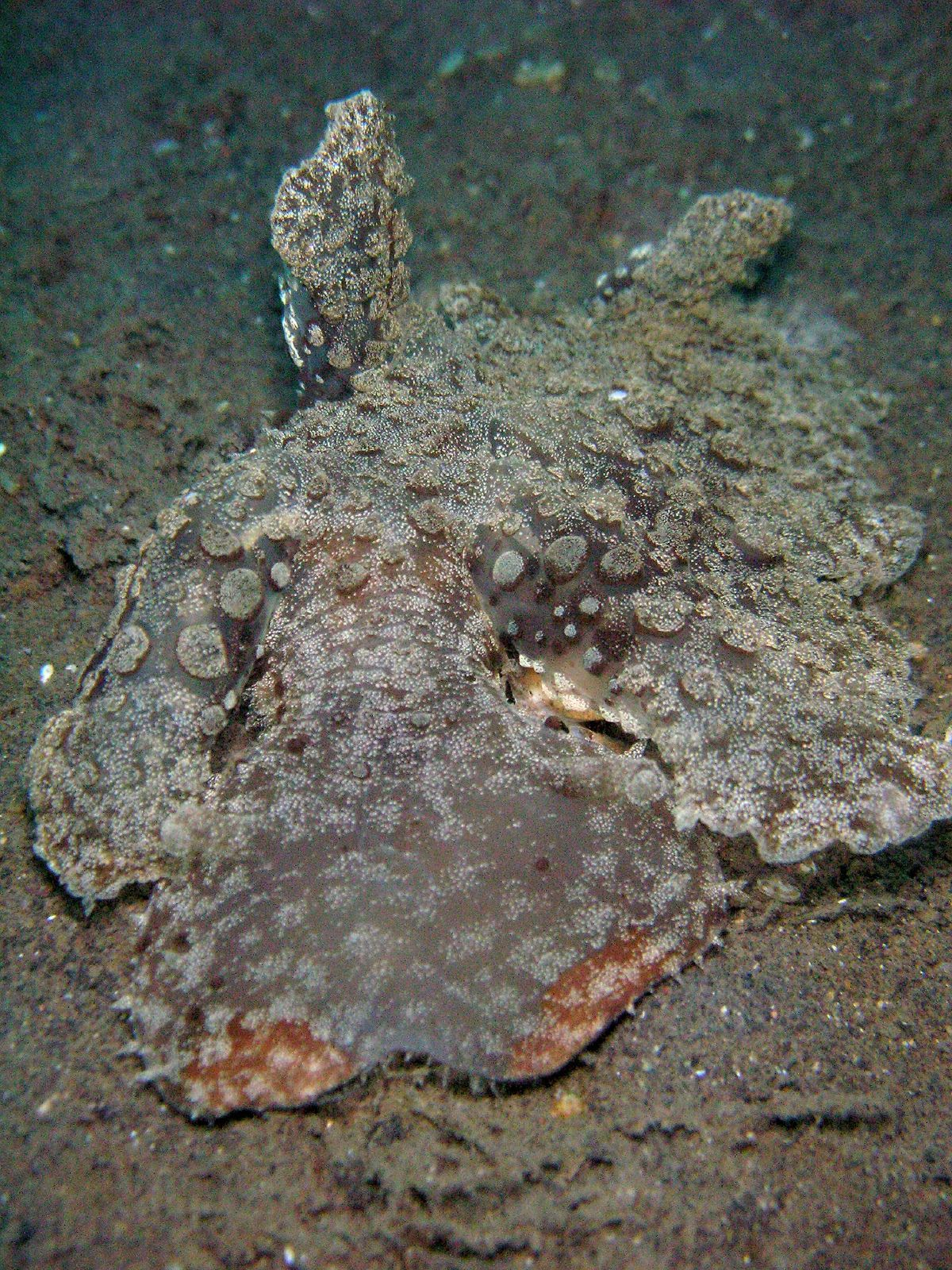
- From left to right in each row, from top to bottom: Dendronotus frondosus (Dendronotidae), Phylliroe bucephala (Phylliroidae), Hancockia californica (Hancockiidae), Doto greenamyeri (Dotidae), Scyllaea fulva (Scyllaeidae), Melibe viridis (Tethydidae)

Scientific classification
- Kingdom: Animalia
- Phylum: Mollusca
- Class: Gastropoda
- Order: Nudibranchia
- Suborder: Dendronotacea; Odhner, 1934
- Superfamily: Dendronotoidea; Allman, 1845

Synonyms
- Dendronotida; Dendronotina

= Dendronotoidea =

Superfamily of gastropods

Dendronotoidea is a superfamily of nudibranchs, shell-less marine gastropod molluscs or sea slugs, and the only member of the suborder Dendronotacea.

== Families ==
The following families are recognised in the superfamily Dendronotoidea:

- Family Bornellidae Bergh, 1874
- Family Dendronotidae Allman, 1845
- Family Dotidae Gray, 1853
- Family Hancockiidae MacFarland, 1923
- Family Lomanotidae Bergh, 1890
- Family Phylliroidae Menke, 1830
- Family Scyllaeidae Alder & Hancock, 1855
- Family Tethydidae Rafinesque, 1815
