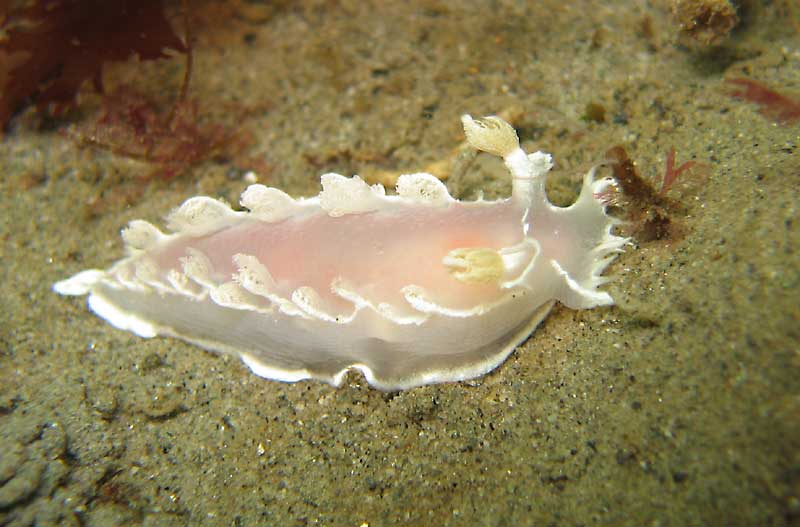
- A live individual of Tritonia festiva in situ
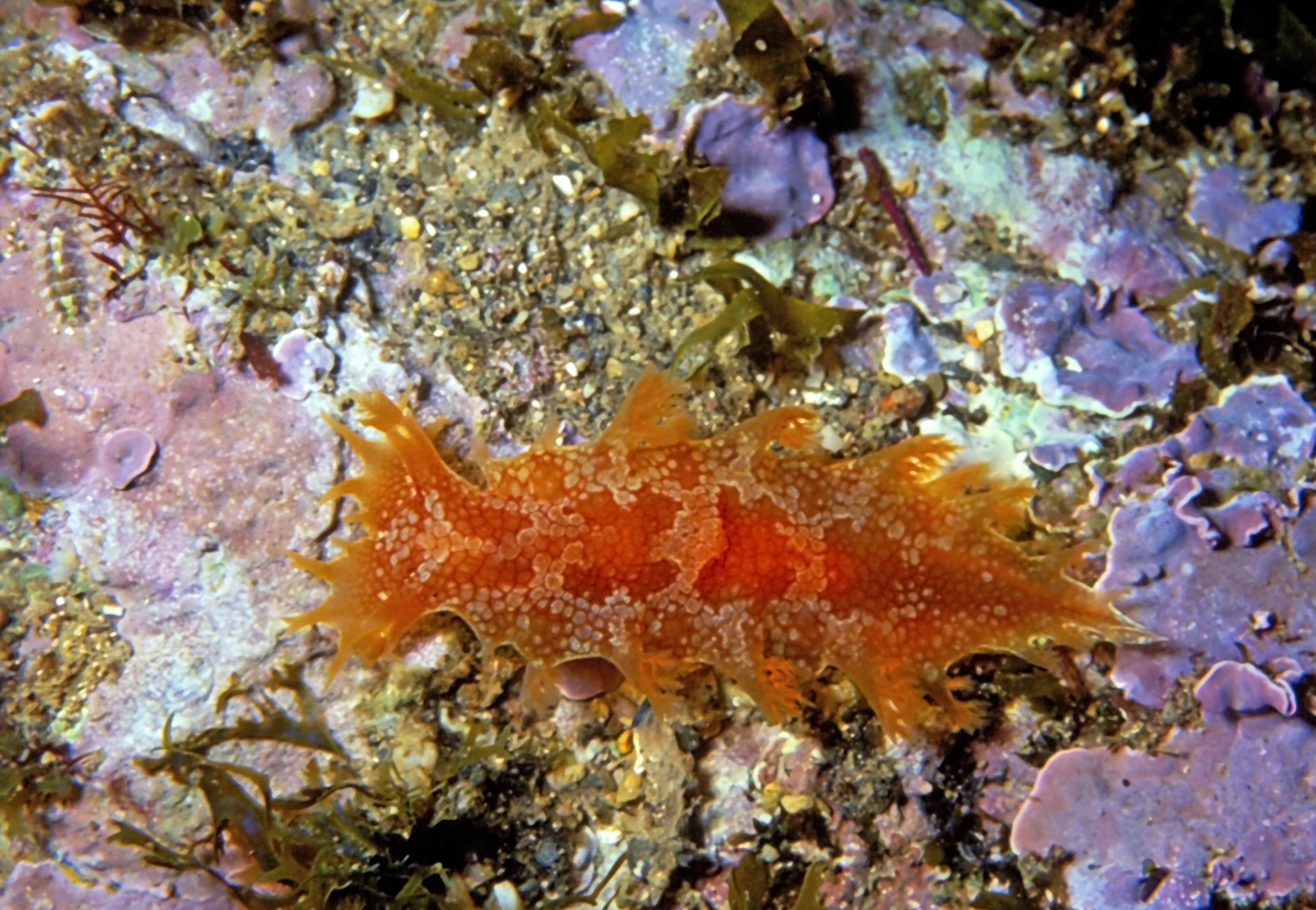
- A live individual of Marionia blainvillea

Scientific classification
- Kingdom: Animalia
- Phylum: Mollusca
- Class: Gastropoda
- Order: Nudibranchia
- Suborder: Tritoniacea; Lamarck, 1809 sensu Minichev and Starobogatov, 1979
- Superfamily: Tritonioidea; Lamarck, 1809
- Family: Tritoniidae; Menke, 1828

Synonyms
- Aranucidae Odhner, 1936; Duvauceliidae Iredale & O'Donoghue, 1923; Marianinidae Odhner, 1968

= Tritoniidae =

Family of gastropods

Tritoniidae are a family of nudibranchs, shell-less marine gastropod molluscs or sea slugs, and the only member of the superfamily Tritonioidea and the suborder Tritoniacea. This family includes some of the largest known nudibranchs, with the NE Atlantic species Tritonia hombergii reaching 20 cm in length.

== Distribution ==
These nudibranchs occur worldwide in warm and temperate seas and in the coldest waters and deep sea, wherever the octocorals which they eat are found.

== Ecology ==
Members of the family Tritoniidae feed on octocorals, including sea pens, alcyonarian soft corals, and gorgonians, often being cryptic in shape and colouration upon them. They share this trait with the Arminidae which were previously thought to be only distantly related, but have been shown to be closely related to the Tritoniidae by a recent study.

== Taxonomy ==
Distributed among two subfamilies, the following genera are recognised in the family Tritoniidae:

- Subfamily Marioniinae F. V. Silva, Pola & Cervera, 2023
  - Genus Marionia Vayssière, 1877
  - Genus Marioniopsis Odhner, 1934
  - Genus Paratritonia Baba, 1949
- Subfamily Tritoniinae Lamarck, 1809
  - Genus Candiella J. E. Gray, 1850
  - Genus Marianina Pruvot-Fol, 1931
  - Genus Myrella Odhner, 1963
  - Genus Tochuina Odhner, 1963
  - Genus Tritonia Cuvier, 1797
  - Genus Tritonicula Korshunova & Martynov, 2020
  - Genus Tritonidoxa Bergh, 1907
  - Genus Tritoniella Eliot, 1907
  - Genus Tritoniopsis Eliot, 1905
