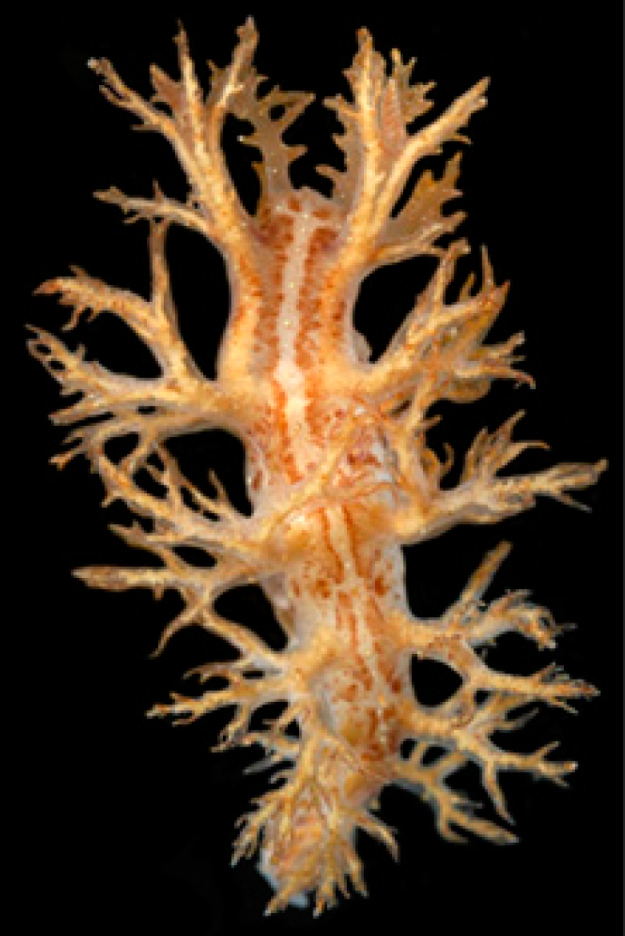

Scientific classification
- Kingdom: Animalia
- Phylum: Mollusca
- Class: Gastropoda
- Order: Nudibranchia
- Suborder: Dendronotacea
- Family: Dendronotidae
- Genus: Dendronotus
- Species: D. kalikal

Binomial name
- Dendronotus kalikal Ekimova, Korshunova, Schepetov, Neretina, Sanamyan & Martynov, 2015

= Dendronotus kalikal =

Species of gastropod

Dendronotus kalikal is a species of sea slug, a dendronotid nudibranch, a shell-less marine gastropod mollusc in the family Dendronotidae.

== Etymology ==
The word kalikal means a variegated pattern in Koryak, one of the indigenous languages of Kamchatka.

== Distribution ==
This species was described from five specimens collected at 14–16 m depth at Starichkov Island, Avachinsky Bay, Kamchatka, northwest Pacific Ocean, 52.77843°N 158.61726°E and other specimens from slightly deeper water as well as one from 60 m depth in the Bering Strait.

== Description ==
Dendronotus kalikal has a patterned body which is similar to Dendronotus frondosus, Dendronotus kamchaticus and Dendronotus venustus. It is distinguished from these species by details of the colour pattern, the branching of the dorsal appendages (cerata), the radula and molecular characters.
