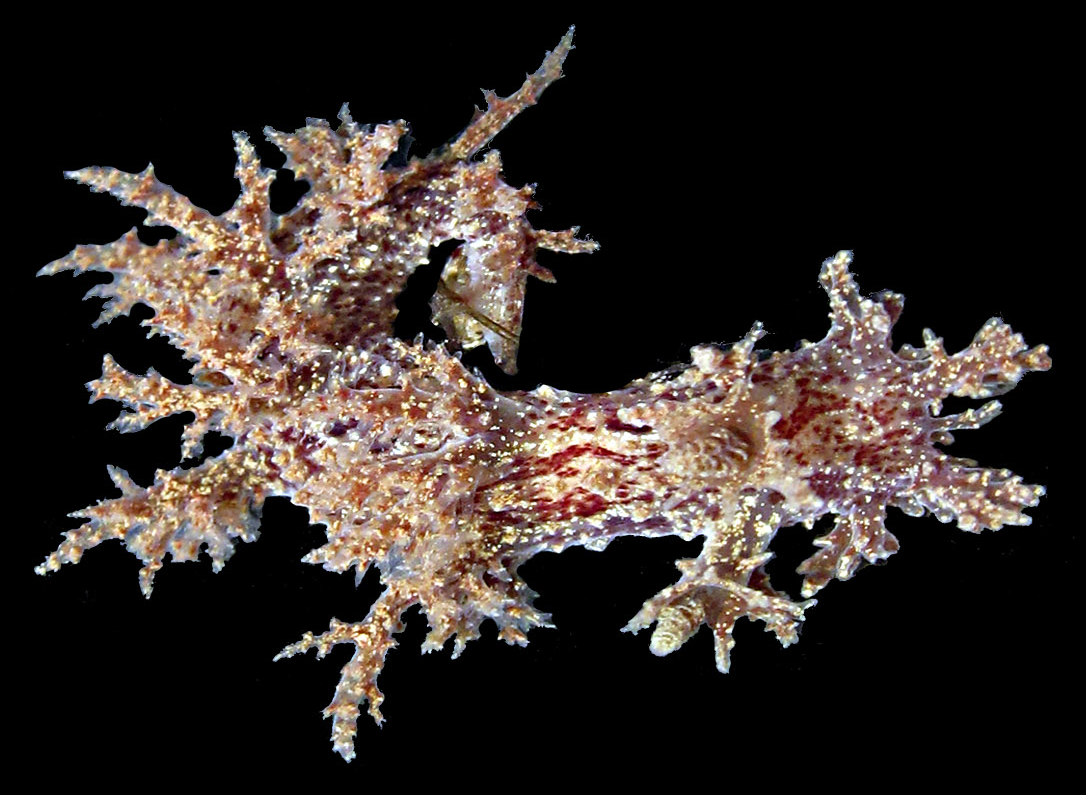
- Dendronotus kamchaticus

Scientific classification
- Kingdom: Animalia
- Phylum: Mollusca
- Class: Gastropoda
- Order: Nudibranchia
- Suborder: Dendronotacea
- Family: Dendronotidae
- Genus: Dendronotus
- Species: D. kamchaticus

Binomial name
- Dendronotus kamchaticus Ekimova, Korshunova, Schepetov, Neretina, Sanamyan & Martynov, 2015

= Dendronotus kamchaticus =

Species of gastropod

Dendronotus kamchaticus is a species of sea slug, a dendronotid nudibranch, a shell-less marine gastropod mollusc in the family Dendronotidae.

== Etymology ==
This species is named after Kamchatka, where it was found.

== Distribution ==
This species was described from specimens collected at 7 m depth at Cape Baraniy, Avachinskiy Bay, Kamchatka, northwest Pacific Ocean.

== Description ==
Dendronotus kamchaticus has a patterned body which is similar to Dendronotus frondosus, Dendronotus kalikal and Dendronotus venustus. It is distinguished from these species by details of the colour pattern, the branching of the dorsal appendages (cerata), the smooth median tooth of the radula in adults and molecular characters.
