= Dendronotus niveus =

Scientific classification
- Kingdom: Animalia
- Phylum: Mollusca
- Class: Gastropoda
- Order: Nudibranchia
- Suborder: Dendronotacea
- Family: Dendronotidae
- Genus: Dendronotus
- Species: D. niveus

Binomial name
- Dendronotus niveus Ekimova, Korshunova, Schepetov, Neretina, Sanamyan & Martynov, 2015

Species of gastropod

Dendronotus niveus is a species of sea slug, a dendronotid nudibranch, a shell-less marine gastropod mollusc in the family Dendronotidae.

== Etymology ==
This species is named from the Latin niveus, meaning snowy white, which refers to the most common colour pattern of this species.

== Distribution ==
This species was described from a specimen collected at 17 m depth at Velikaya Salma Strait, Kandalaksha Bay, White Sea, Russia. Numerous specimens from the White Sea and the Barents Sea to a maximum depth of 156 m are included in the material described.

== Description ==
Dendronotus niveus has a translucent white, pinkish or beige body which is similar to Dendronotus dalli and white morphs of Dendronotus frondosus with which it has been confused in the past. It has opaque white pigment within the tips of the dorsal appendages and rhinophore sheaths which may disappear in adults. It is distinguished from other Dendronotus species by the branching of the dorsal appendages (cerata), the smooth median tooth of the radula in adults and molecular characters.

== Diet ==
Dendronotus niveus feeding on Diphasia fallax (Johnston, 1847) were pink in colour but after feeding on Hydrallmania falcata (Linnaeus, 1758) and Sertularia mirabilis (Verrill, 1873) in the laboratory became milky white.
