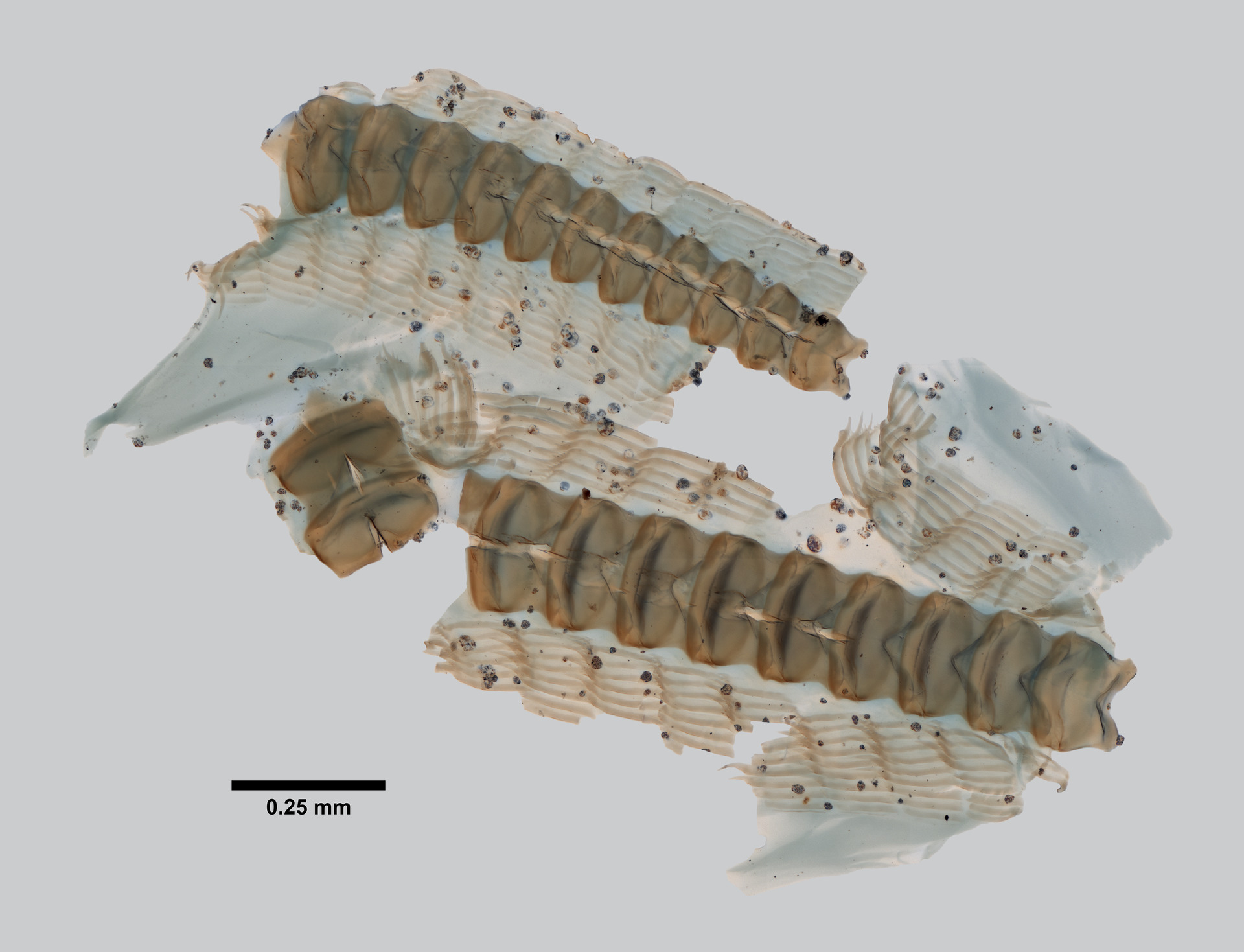
- Dendronotus elegans

Scientific classification
- Kingdom: Animalia
- Phylum: Mollusca
- Class: Gastropoda
- Order: Nudibranchia
- Suborder: Dendronotacea
- Family: Dendronotidae
- Genus: Dendronotus
- Species: D. elegans

Binomial name
- Dendronotus elegans A. E. Verrill, 1880

= Dendronotus elegans =

Species of gastropod

Dendronotus elegans is a species of sea slug, a dendronotid nudibranch, a shell-less marine gastropod mollusc in the family Dendronotidae.

== Distribution ==
This species was described from 48 m depth off Cape Cod, Massachusetts, Atlantic Ocean 42.16°N 70.22°W. It is a possible synonym of Dendronotus frondosus.
