= Dendronotus patricki =

Scientific classification
- Kingdom: Animalia
- Phylum: Mollusca
- Class: Gastropoda
- Order: Nudibranchia
- Suborder: Dendronotacea
- Family: Dendronotidae
- Genus: Dendronotus
- Species: D. patricki

Binomial name
- Dendronotus patricki Stout, N. G. Wilson & Valdés, 2011

Species of gastropod

Dendronotus patricki is a species of sea slug, a dendronotid nudibranch, a shell-less marine gastropod mollusc in the family Dendronotidae.

== Distribution ==
This species was described from a whalefall, a dead whale which was experimentally placed in Monterey Canyon, California at a depth of 1820 m (36°42′30″N 122°06′19″W). It was also seen on video from an ROV at another whalefall in Santa Cruz Basin, 33°29′40″N 119°22′04″W at a depth of 1676 m.

== Description ==
Dendronotus patricki is a translucent species of Dendronotus with no surface markings and a reddish-brown hue to the body. It grows to at least 25 mm in length. There is a small amount of opaque white pigment at the tips of the dorsal appendages, velar appendages and rhinophore sheath papillae.

== Habitat ==
Dendronotus patricki was found crawling on a muddy seabed. Its stomach contents included structures thought to be nematocysts. It is possible that it feeds on burrowing cerianthid anemones as does Dendronotus iris.
