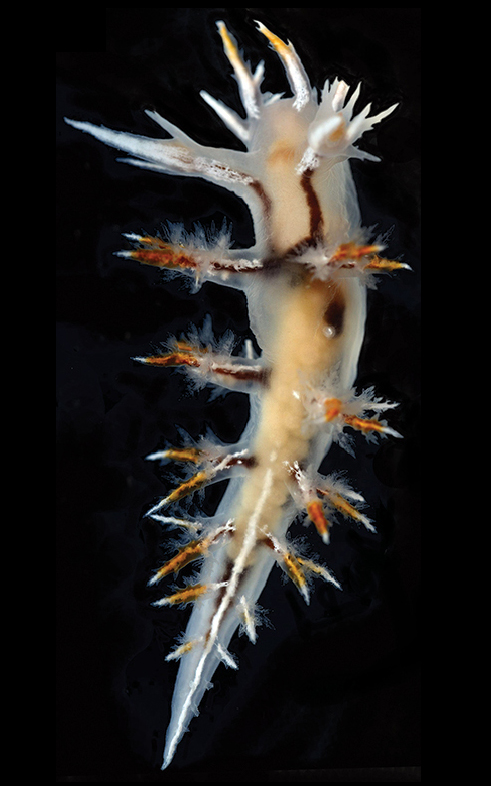

Scientific classification
- Kingdom: Animalia
- Phylum: Mollusca
- Class: Gastropoda
- Order: Nudibranchia
- Suborder: Dendronotacea
- Family: Dendronotidae
- Genus: Dendronotus
- Species: D. robilliardi

Binomial name
- Dendronotus robilliardi Korshunova, Sanamyan, Zimina, Fletcher & Martynov, 2016

Synonyms
- Dendronotus albus sensu Robilliard, 1970

= Dendronotus robilliardi =

Species of gastropod

Dendronotus robilliardi is a species of sea slugs, a dendronotid nudibranch, a shell-less marine gastropod mollusc in the family Dendronotidae.

== Taxonomic history ==
This species was correctly recognised as separate from Dendronotus albus by Robilliard in 1960. However he identified it as D. albus and described the true D. albus as Dendronotus diversicolor.

== Distribution ==
This marine animal can be found in the NE Pacific Ocean from Alaska to California and in the NW Pacific from Russia and Korea.

== Description ==
This species grows to a maximum length of 40 mm. It is distinguished from Dendronotus albus by having more than four pairs of cerata, (typically 5 to 7), whilst D . albus is a bigger animal but has no more than four or five pairs. The body and cerata are translucent white with opaque white and orange-yellow tips to the cerata, although in some cases the orange-yellow is absent.

== Diet ==
This species feeds preferentially on the hydroid Thuiaria argentea in the family Sertulariidae. Dendronotus albus is said to prefer Abietinaria greenei, Hydrallmania distans and Abietinaria amphora.
