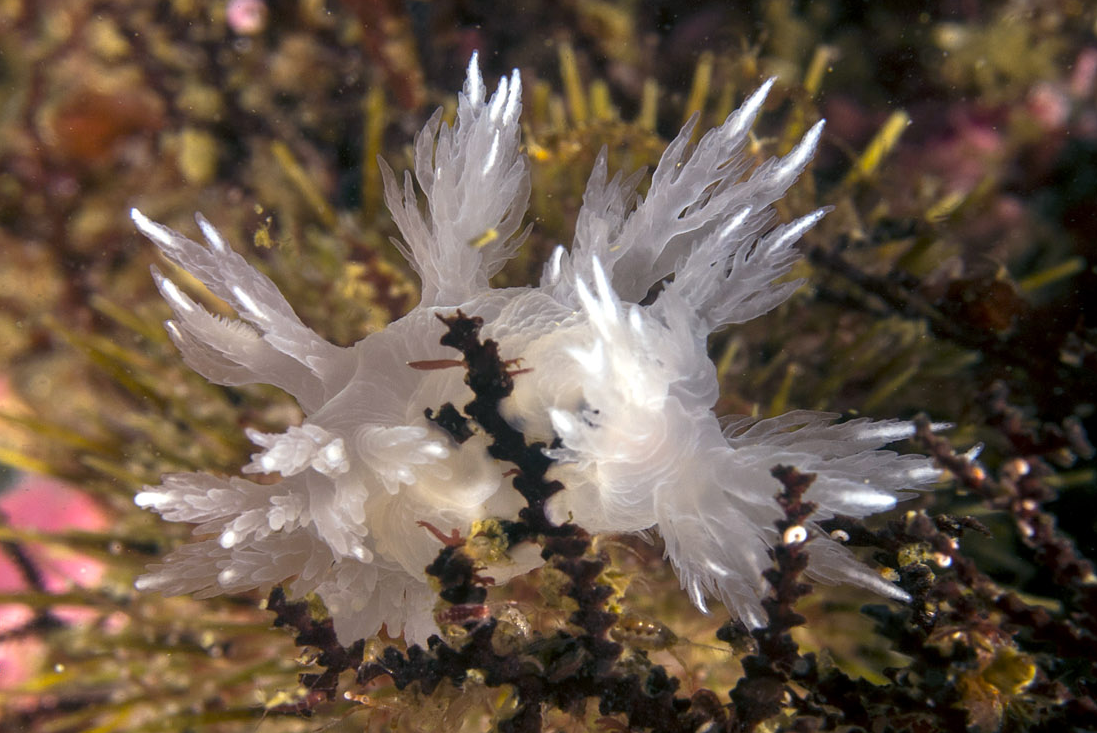

Scientific classification
- Kingdom: Animalia
- Phylum: Mollusca
- Class: Gastropoda
- Order: Nudibranchia
- Suborder: Dendronotacea
- Family: Dendronotidae
- Genus: Dendronotus
- Species: D. dalli

Binomial name
- Dendronotus dalli Bergh, 1879

= Dendronotus dalli =

Species of sea slug

Dendronotus dalli is a species of sea slug, a dendronotid nudibranch, a shell-less marine gastropod mollusc in the family Dendronotidae.

== Distribution ==
This species was described from the Bering Sea. It can be found along the west coast of North America from the Bering Sea, Alaska to Puget Sound, Washington. Similar looking animals from the White Sea and Barents Sea, North Atlantic have been demonstrated to be a distinct species, Dendronotus niveus.

== Diet ==
Dendronotus dalli feeds on the hydroids Abietinaria rigida and Abietinaria amphora, family Sertulariidae.
