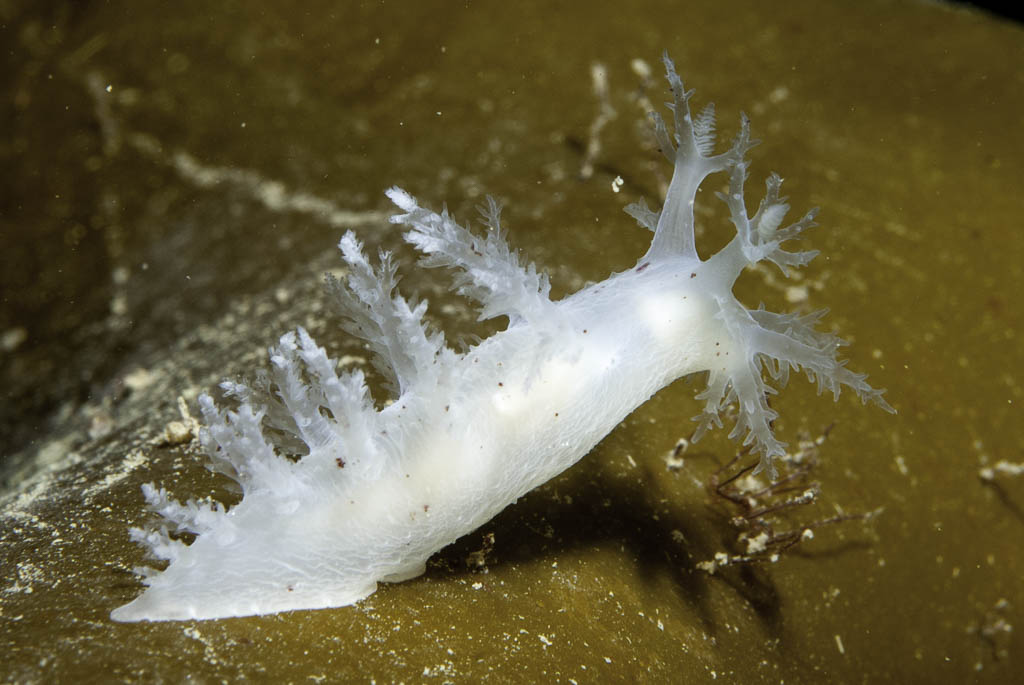
- The nudibranch Dendronotus lacteus, Eilean Dubh Beag, Firth of Lorne, Scotland.

Scientific classification
- Domain: Eukaryota
- Kingdom: Animalia
- Phylum: Mollusca
- Class: Gastropoda
- Order: Nudibranchia
- Suborder: Cladobranchia
- Family: Dendronotidae
- Genus: Dendronotus
- Species: D. lacteus

Binomial name
- Dendronotus lacteus (W. Thompson, 1840)

Synonyms
- Tritonia lactea W. Thompson, 1840 (basionym)

= Dendronotus lacteus =

Species of gastropod

Dendronotus lacteus is a species of sea slug, a dendronotid nudibranch, a shell-less marine gastropod mollusc in the family Dendronotidae.

== Distribution ==
This species was described from a specimen collected at the entrance to Strangford Lough, Northern Ireland, Irish Sea. It was long considered to be a synonym of Dendronotus frondosus but separated by Thollesson in 2000 using the technique of allozyme electrophoresis. This was confirmed with DNA sequencing in 2015. The species is known from the Irish Sea north to Spitsbergen, Franz Josef Land, and the Barents Sea.
