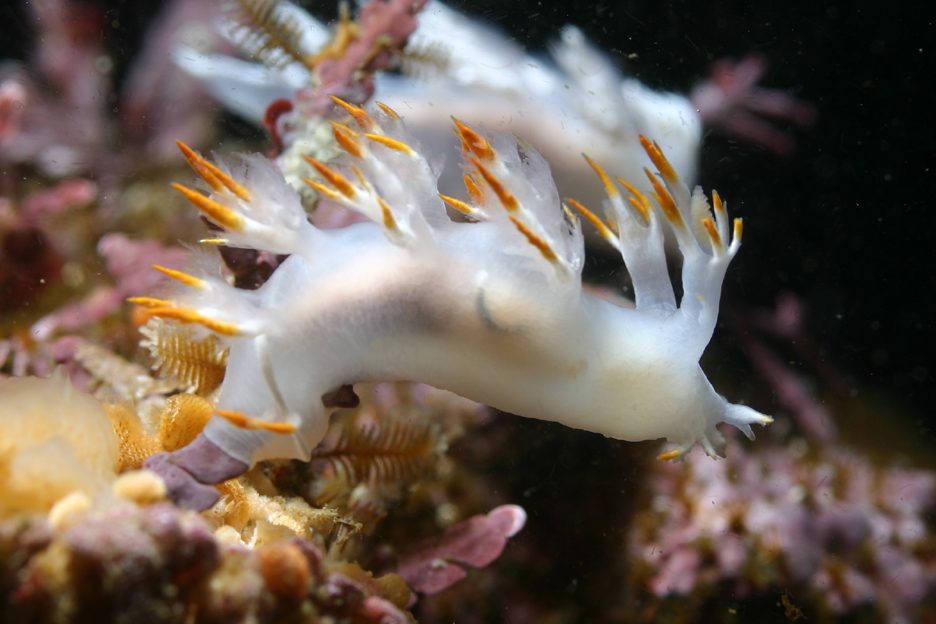

Scientific classification
- Kingdom: Animalia
- Phylum: Mollusca
- Class: Gastropoda
- Order: Nudibranchia
- Suborder: Dendronotacea
- Family: Dendronotidae
- Genus: Dendronotus
- Species: D. albus

Binomial name
- Dendronotus albus (MacFarland, 1966)

Synonyms
- Dendronotus diversicolor Robilliard, 1970

= Dendronotus albus =

Species of gastropod

Dendronotus albus is a species of sea slug, a dendronotid nudibranch, a shell-less marine gastropod mollusc in the family Dendronotidae.

== Distribution ==
This species was described from shallow water at Point Pinos, Monterey Bay, California, United States. It has been reported from the west coast of North America from Alaska to Baja California, Mexico.

== Taxonomic history ==
Robilliard correctly recognised that there were two species of Dendronotus in the NE Pacific and described Dendronotus diversicolor as a new species. D. albus and D. diversicolor were synonymised by Stout et al., 2010, probably because the specimens they studied did not include both species. In fact Robilliard consistently used the name D. albus for Dendronotus robilliardi and redescribed the true D. albus as D. diversicolor.

== Description ==
This species grows to a maximum length of 73 mm. It is distinguished from Dendronotus robilliardi by having only four pairs of large cerata (and two extra, small cerata in big animals). D. robilliardi is a smaller animal but has 5–7 pairs. The body and cerata are translucent white with opaque white and orange-yellow tips to the cerata, although in some cases the orange-yellow is absent.

== Diet ==
This species feeds preferentially on the hydroids Abietinaria greenei, Hydrallmania distans and Abietinaria amphora. Dendronotus robilliardi is said to prefer Thuiaria argentea in the family Sertulariidae.
