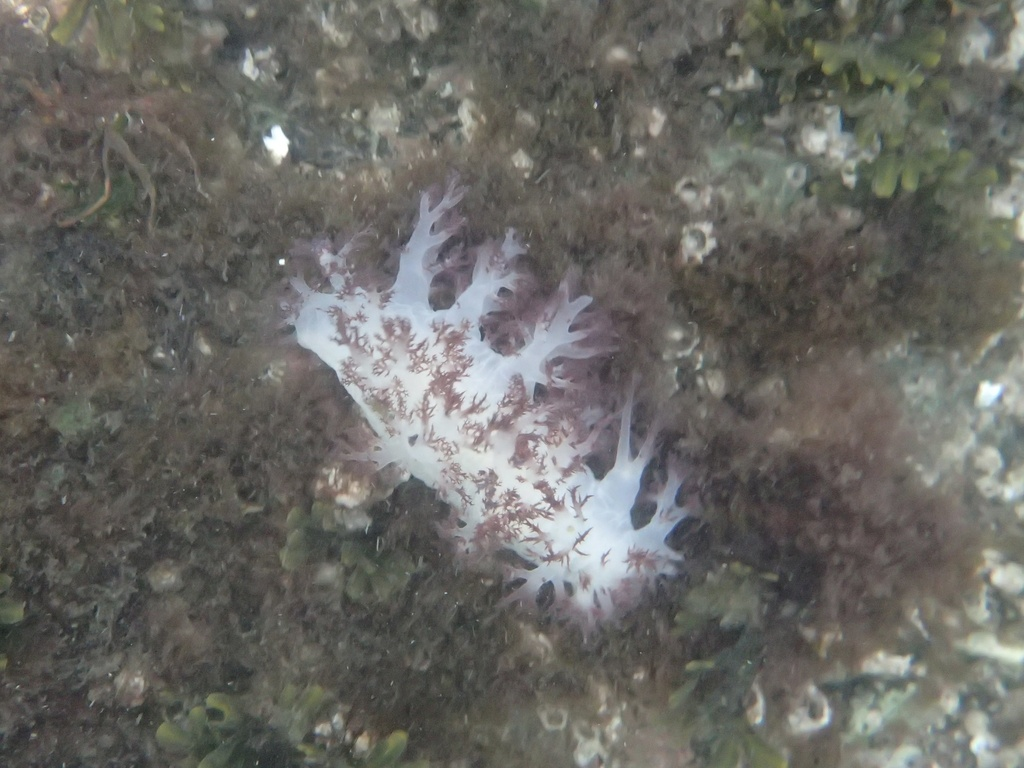

Scientific classification
- Kingdom: Animalia
- Phylum: Mollusca
- Class: Gastropoda
- Order: Nudibranchia
- Suborder: Dendronotacea
- Family: Dendronotidae
- Genus: Dendronotus
- Species: D. rufus

Binomial name
- Dendronotus rufus O'Donoghue, 1921

= Dendronotus rufus =

Species of gastropod

Dendronotus rufus is a species of sea slug, a dendronotid nudibranch, a shell-less marine gastropod mollusc in the family Dendronotidae.

== Distribution ==
This species was described from specimens dredged at 22–38 m depth between Brandon Island and Departure Bay and from Nanoose Bay, British Columbia. It can be found on the Pacific Ocean coast of North America from Auke Bay, Alaska to Seattle, Washington, United States.

== Biology ==
This species feeds on hydroids and scyphozoans. It has been suggested that this species defends it eggs from starfish predators.
