= Bornella irvingi =

Scientific classification
- Domain: Eukaryota
- Kingdom: Animalia
- Phylum: Mollusca
- Class: Gastropoda
- Order: Nudibranchia
- Suborder: Cladobranchia
- Family: Bornellidae
- Genus: Bornella
- Species: B. irvingi

Binomial name
- Bornella irvingi Edmunds & Preece, 1996

Species of gastropod

Bornella irvingi is a species of sea slug, a nudibranch, a shell-less marine gastropod mollusc in the family Bornellidae.

== Distribution ==
This species was described from the Pitcairn Islands, Pacific Ocean.

== Description ==
Bornella irvingi has a smooth white body, white gills and lateral appendages. The velar tentacles, rhinophore clubs and rhinophore sheath processes are orange, with white bases. There is a dark brown area on the head separating these processes from the rest of the body.
