= Cabangus noahi =

Scientific classification
- Kingdom: Animalia
- Phylum: Mollusca
- Class: Gastropoda
- Order: Nudibranchia
- Suborder: Dendronotacea
- Family: Dendronotidae
- Genus: Cabangus
- Species: C. noahi

Binomial name
- Cabangus noahi Pola & Stout, 2008

Species of gastropod

Cabangus noahi is a species of sea slug, a dendronotid nudibranch, a shell-less marine gastropod mollusc in the family Dendronotidae.

== Distribution ==
This species was described from the outer barrier reef off New Year's Bay, Bagabag Island, Papua New Guinea.

== Habitat ==
Cabangus noahi was found under coral on an exposed reef slope at 20 m depth.
