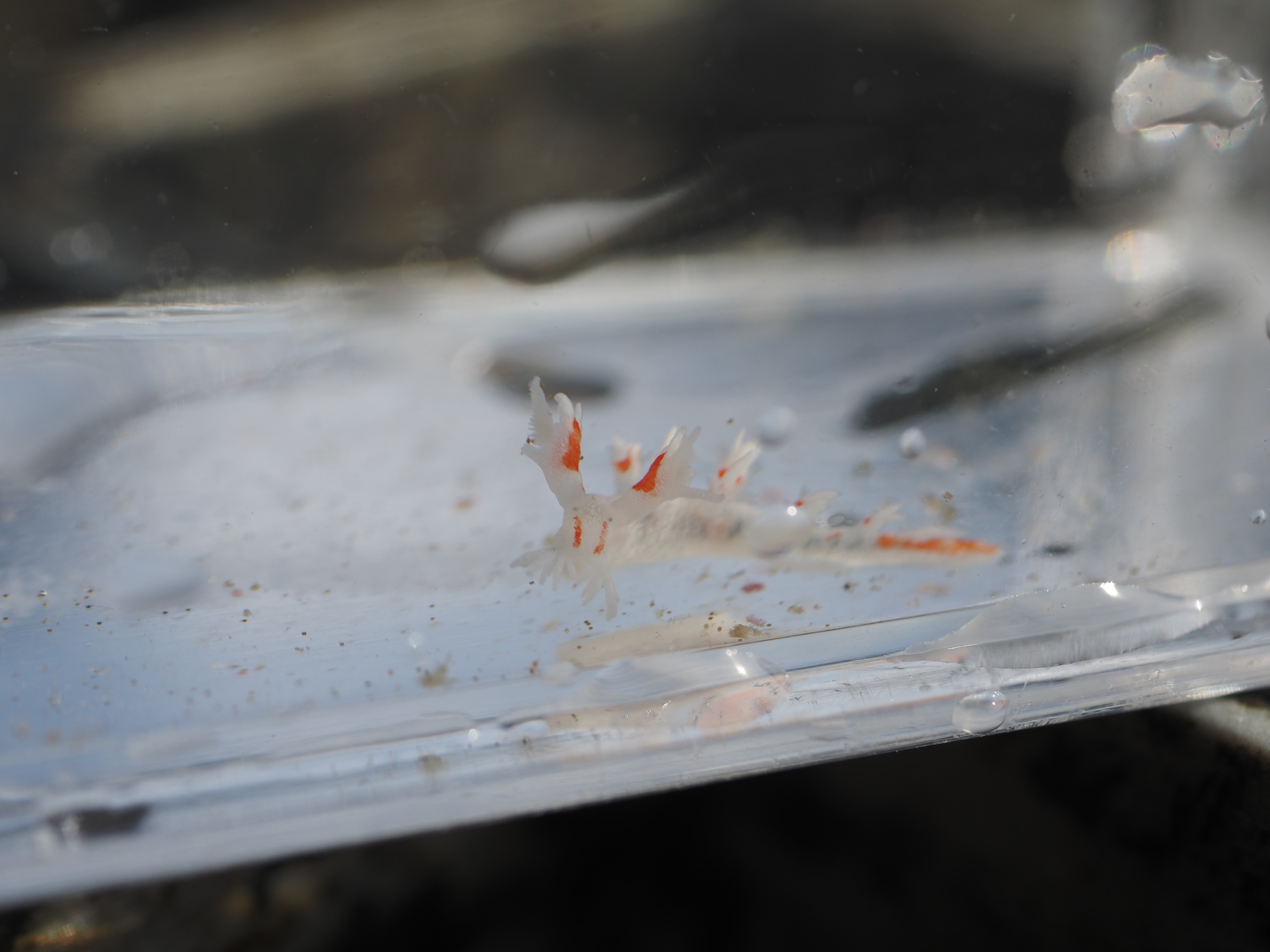

Scientific classification
- Kingdom: Animalia
- Phylum: Mollusca
- Class: Gastropoda
- Order: Nudibranchia
- Suborder: Dendronotacea
- Family: Bornellidae
- Genus: Bornella
- Species: B. pele

Binomial name
- Bornella pele Pola, Rudman & Gosliner, 2009
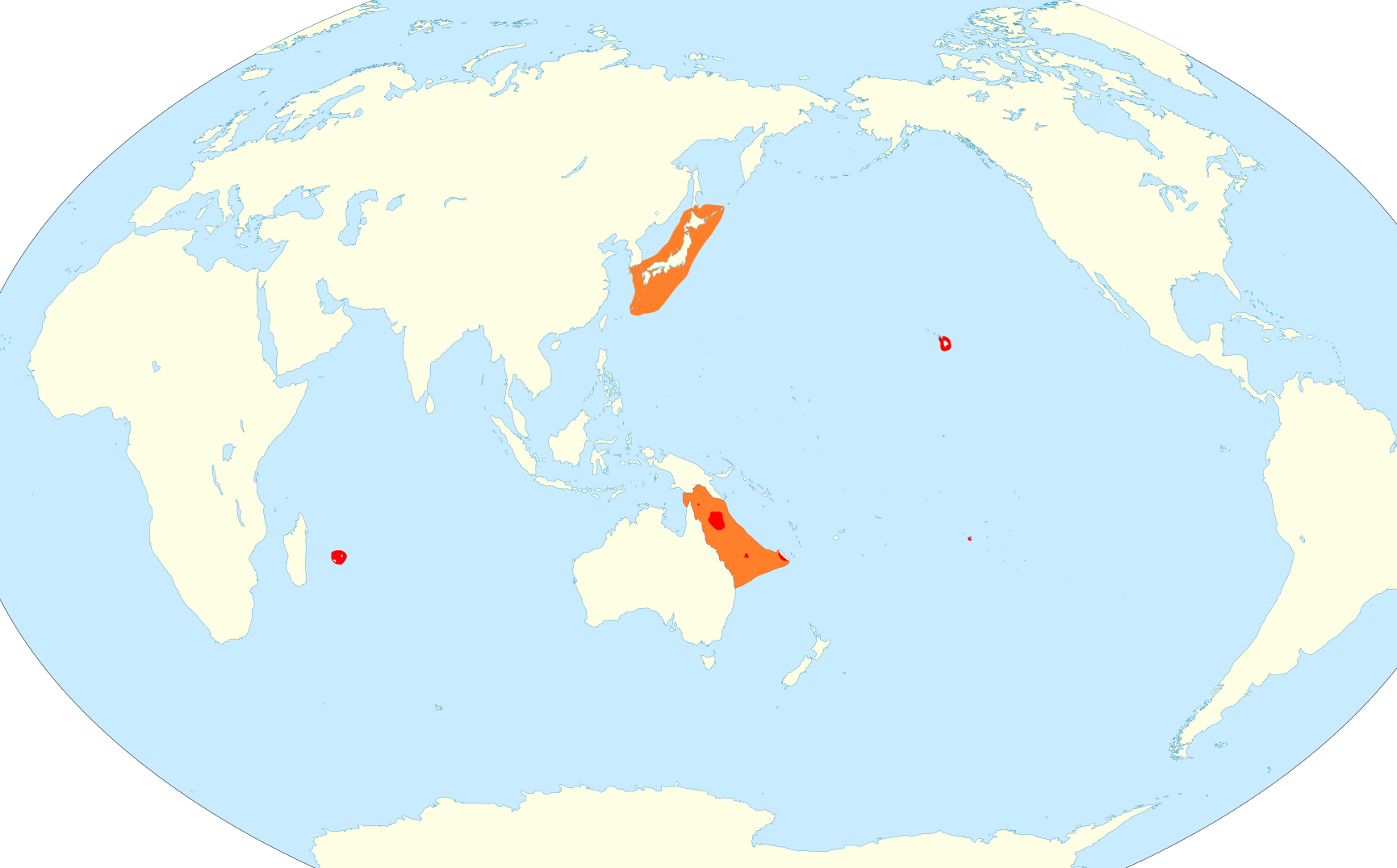

= Bornella pele =

Species of marine gastropod mollusc

Bornella pele is a species of nudibranch in the family Bornellidae. It is found in waters off Hawaiʻi, Australia, Japan, French Polynesia, and Réunion. The species epithet derives from Pele, the Hawaiian god of volcanoes, due to the nudibranch's red markings.

== Description ==
Bornella pele is a small species, growing up to 2 centimetres (0.79 in) in length. It is long and slug-like in shape.

The body is translucent white and speckled with opaque white spots. There are red streaks along the processes of the back and sides, from the oral tentacles to the base of the rhinopore sheaths, on the cerata and the inner side of the rhinphore sheaths.
