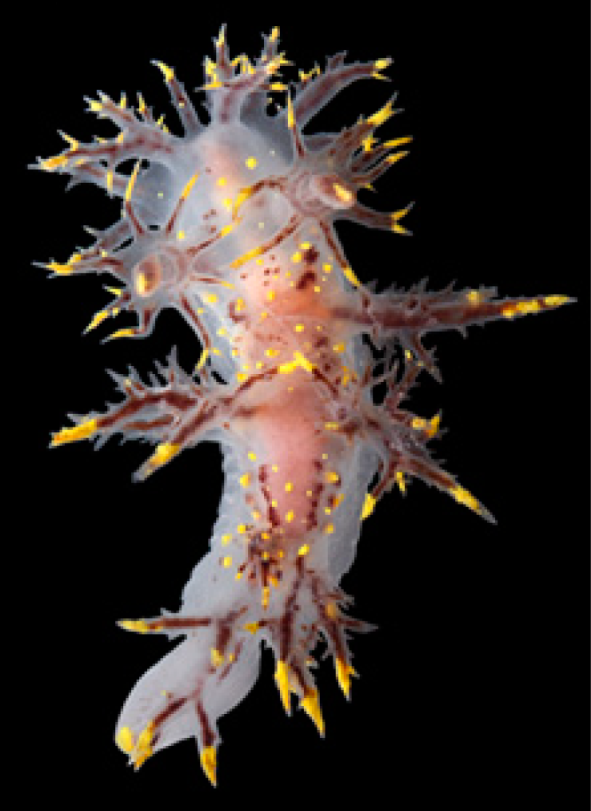

Scientific classification
- Kingdom: Animalia
- Phylum: Mollusca
- Class: Gastropoda
- Order: Nudibranchia
- Suborder: Dendronotacea
- Family: Dendronotidae
- Genus: Dendronotus
- Species: D. arcticus

Binomial name
- Dendronotus arcticus Korshunova, Sanamyan, Zimina, Fletcher & Martynov, 2016

= Dendronotus arcticus =

Species of gastropod

Dendronotus arcticus is a species of sea slugs, a dendronotid nudibranch, a shell-less marine gastropod mollusc in the family Dendronotidae.

== Distribution ==
This species was described from four specimens collected together at 15 m depth in the Laptev Sea, 74°35′N 115°43′E.
