= Dendronotus comteti =

Conservation status
- Least Concern (IUCN 3.1)

Scientific classification
- Kingdom: Animalia
- Phylum: Mollusca
- Class: Gastropoda
- Order: Nudibranchia
- Suborder: Dendronotacea
- Family: Dendronotidae
- Genus: Dendronotus
- Species: D. comteti

Binomial name
- Dendronotus comteti Valdés & Bouchet, 1998

Species of gastropod

Dendronotus comteti is a species of sea slug, a dendronotid nudibranch, a shell-less marine gastropod mollusc in the family Dendronotidae.

== Distribution ==
This species was described from specimens collected from near hydrothermal vents by the submersible Nautile at the Lucky Strike area (37°17.3′N 32°16.5′W) of the Mid-Atlantic Ridge at 1685 m depth.
