= Dendronotus gracilis =

Scientific classification
- Kingdom: Animalia
- Phylum: Mollusca
- Class: Gastropoda
- Order: Nudibranchia
- Suborder: Dendronotacea
- Family: Dendronotidae
- Genus: Dendronotus
- Species: D. gracilis

Binomial name
- Dendronotus gracilis Baba, 1949

Species of gastropod

Dendronotus gracilis is a species of sea slug, a dendronotid nudibranch, a shell-less marine gastropod mollusc in the family Dendronotidae.

== Distribution ==
This species was described from Sagami Bay, Japan. It has been reported from Okinawa and New Zealand.
