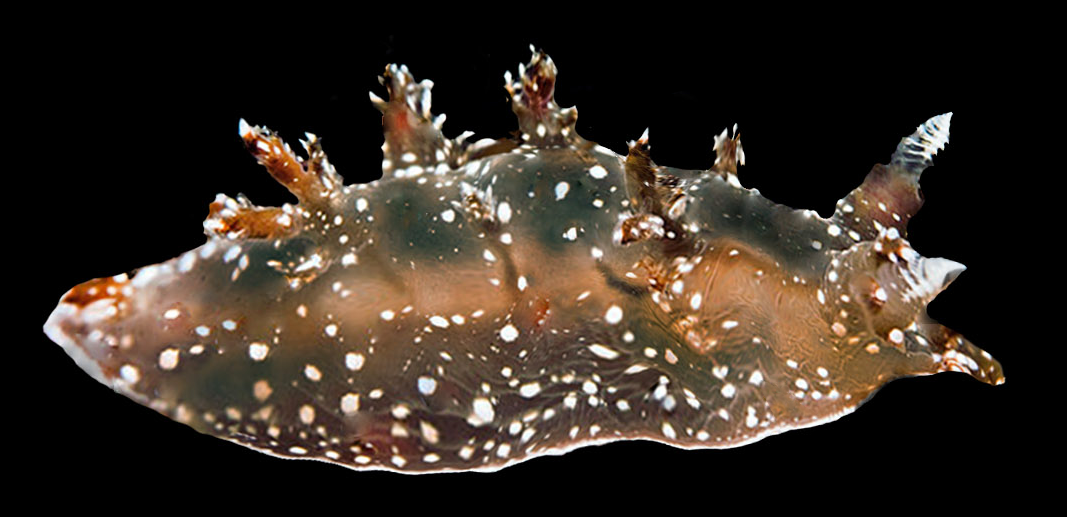

Scientific classification
- Kingdom: Animalia
- Phylum: Mollusca
- Class: Gastropoda
- Order: Nudibranchia
- Suborder: Dendronotacea
- Family: Dendronotidae
- Genus: Dendronotus
- Species: D. albopunctatus

Binomial name
- Dendronotus albopunctatus Robilliard, 1972

= Dendronotus albopunctatus =

Species of gastropod

Dendronotus albopunctatus is a species of sea slug, a dendronotid nudibranch, a shell-less marine gastropod mollusc in the family Dendronotidae.

== Distribution ==
This species can be found on the Pacific Ocean coast of North America.

== Description ==
Dendronotus albopunctatus is a large dendronotid nudibranch, growing to at least 60 mm in length. The body is translucent white with a red-brown hue on the back. There are opaque white spots on the sides and back of the body, velar processes and rhinophore sheaths. The body shape is similar to Dendronotus robustus, with a broad foot.

== Feeding habits ==
This species feeds on hydroids.
