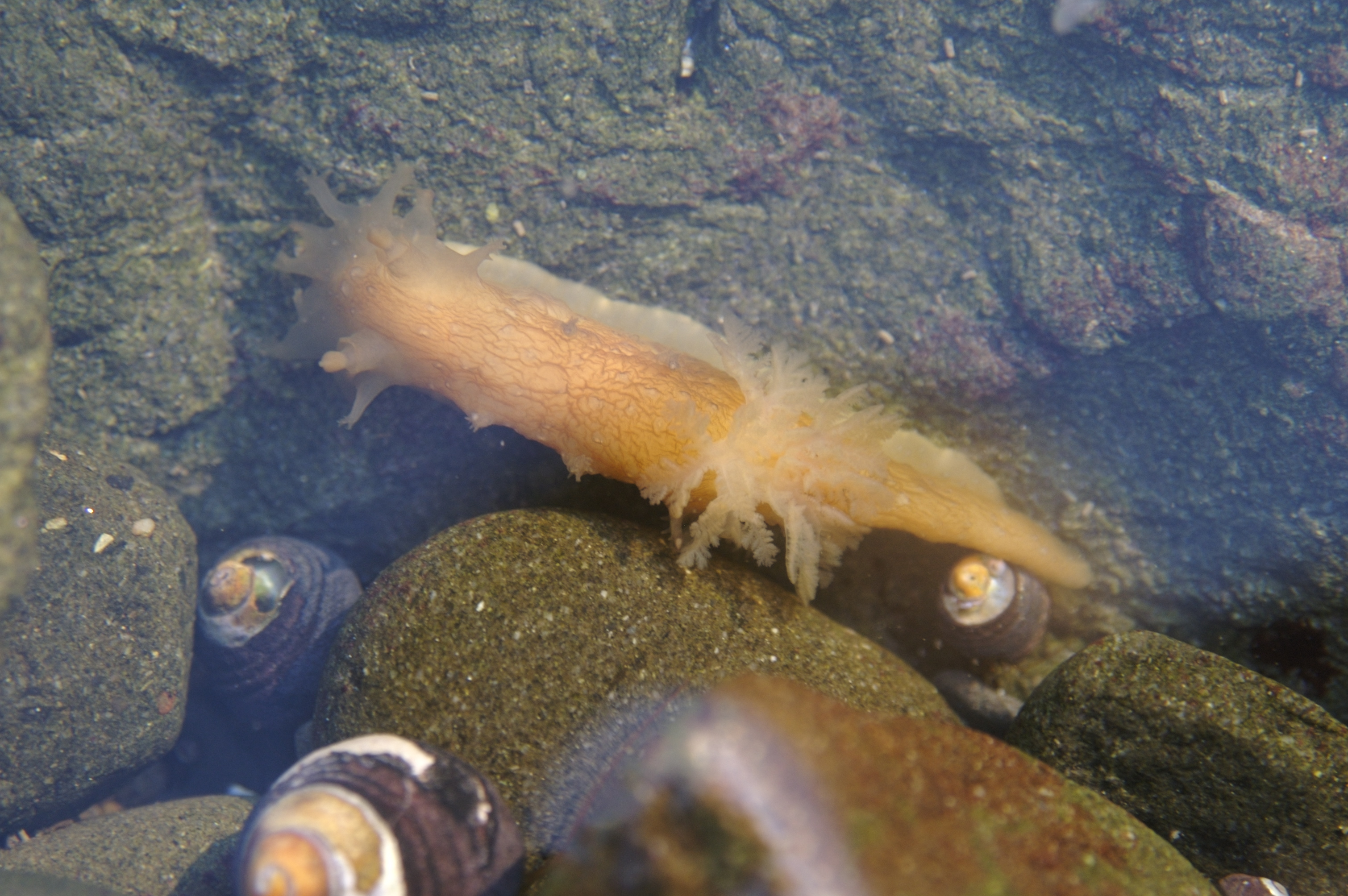

Scientific classification
- Kingdom: Animalia
- Phylum: Mollusca
- Class: Gastropoda
- Order: Nudibranchia
- Suborder: Dendronotacea
- Family: Dendronotidae
- Genus: Dendronotus
- Species: D. subramosus

Binomial name
- Dendronotus subramosus (MacFarland, 1966)

= Dendronotus subramosus =

Species of gastropod

Dendronotus subramosus is a species of sea slug, a dendronotid nudibranch, a shell-less marine gastropod mollusc in the family Dendronotidae.

== Distribution ==
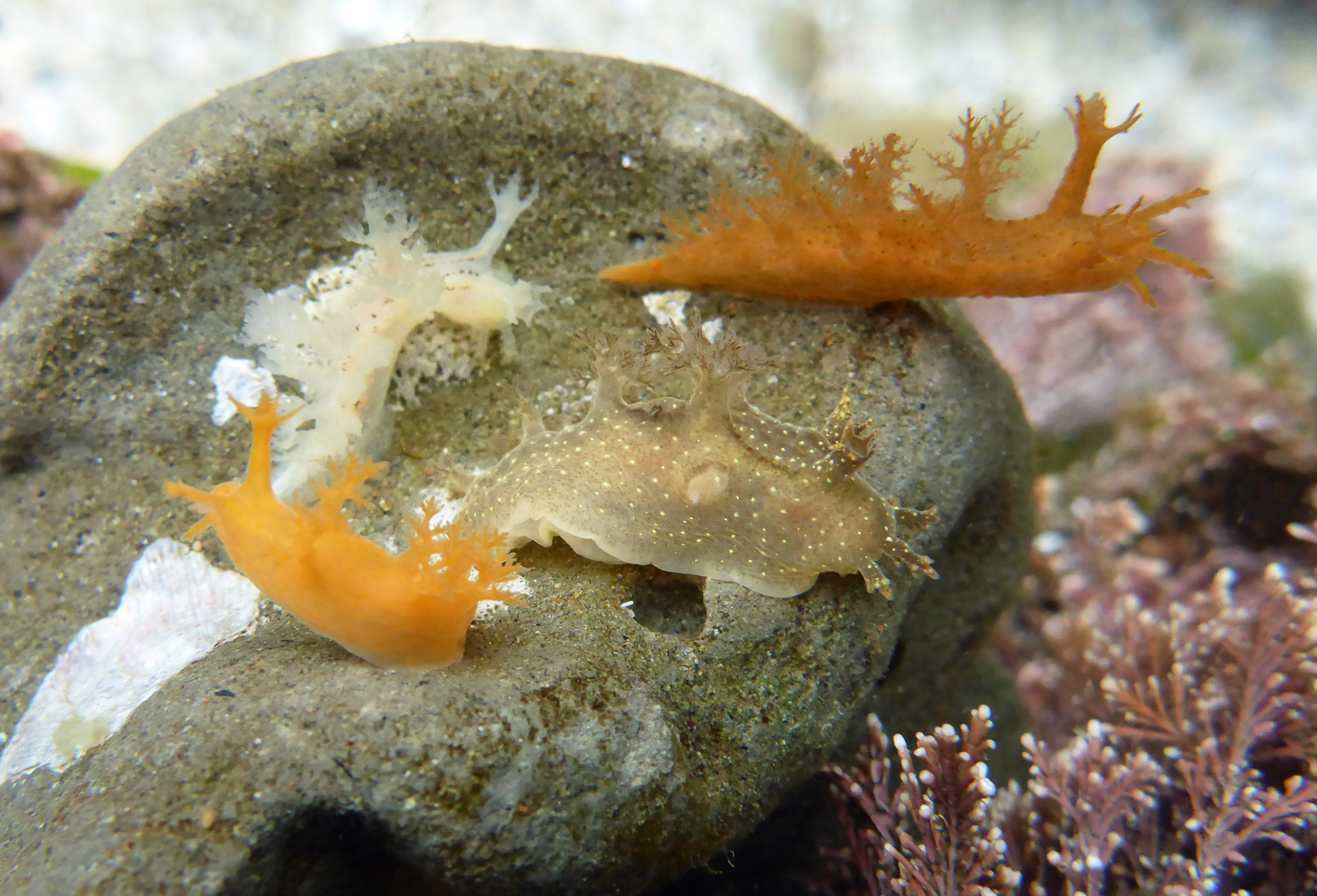
Dendronotus subramosus color variations

This species can be found on the Pacific Ocean coast of North America from Bamfield, Vancouver Island, British Columbia to Islas Coronado, Baja California, Mexico.

== Feeding habits ==
This species feeds on the hydroid Aglaophenia.
