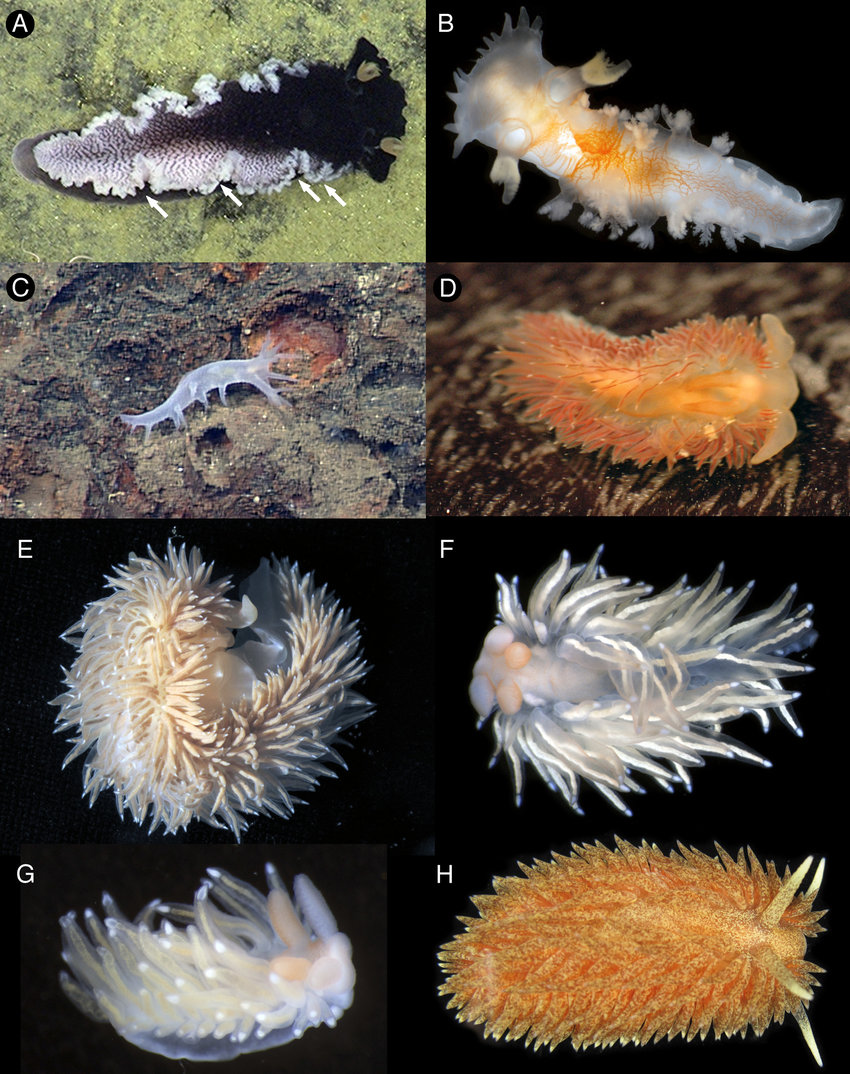
- C. Dendronotus claguei sp. nov., holotype (LACM 3555), in situ.

Scientific classification
- Kingdom: Animalia
- Phylum: Mollusca
- Class: Gastropoda
- Order: Nudibranchia
- Suborder: Dendronotacea
- Family: Dendronotidae
- Genus: Dendronotus
- Species: D. claguei

Binomial name
- Dendronotus claguei Valdés, Lundsten & N. G. Wilson, 2018

= Dendronotus claguei =

Species of gastropod

Dendronotus claguei is a species of sea slug in the family Dendronotidae. It was discovered by the MBARI while exploring the Alarcón Rise, found on an inactive hydrothermal chimney. The scientists collected two specimens, one 7 mm in length and the other 18 mm in length. Their discovery raised questions on how nudibranchs were surviving 2,370 m below the surface, living in a low food environment where very few other animals could be found.
