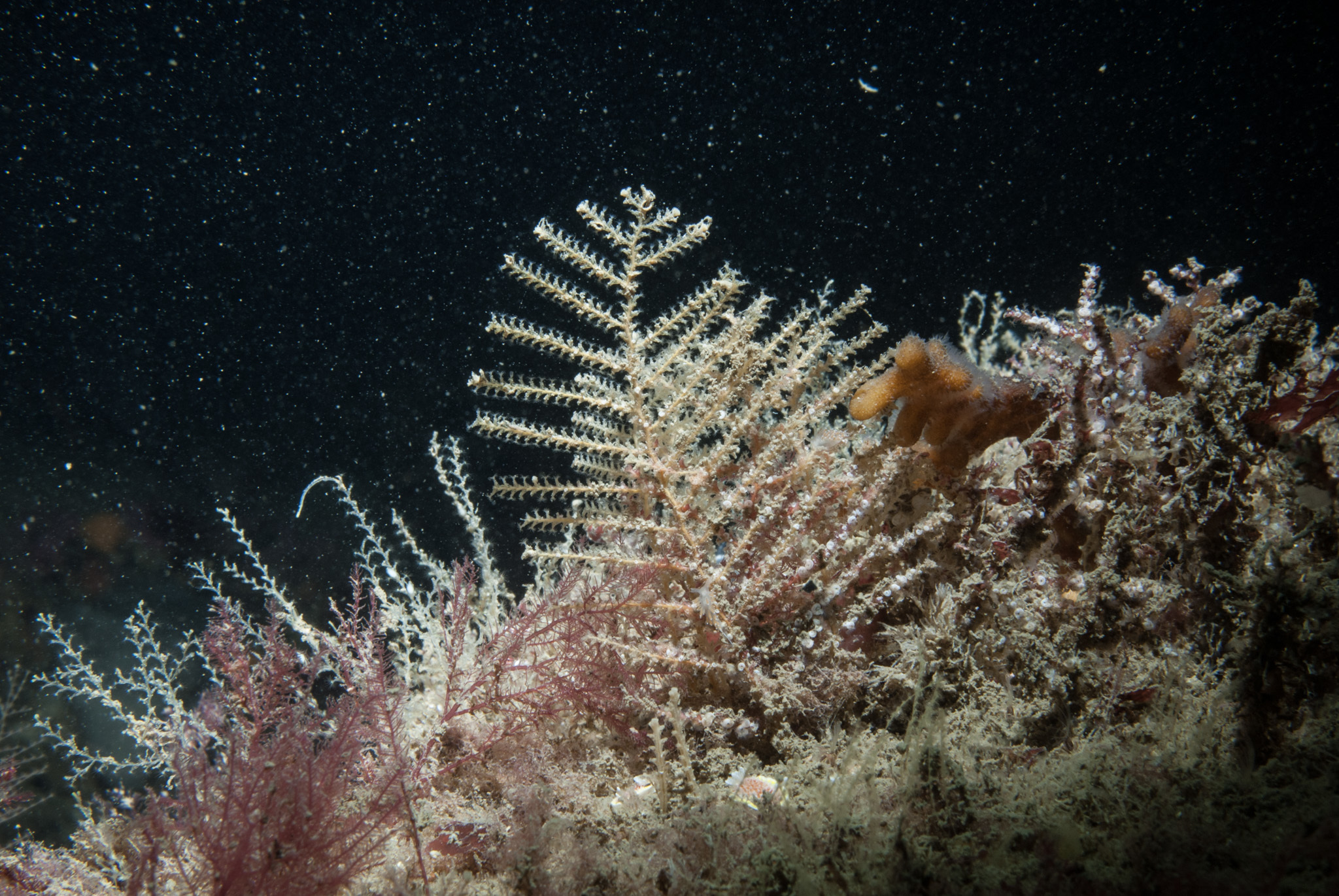
- Abietinaria abietina

Scientific classification
- Domain: Eukaryota
- Kingdom: Animalia
- Phylum: Cnidaria
- Class: Hydrozoa
- Order: Leptothecata
- Family: Sertulariidae
- Genus: Abietinaria; Kirchenpauer, 1884

= Abietinaria =

Genus of hydrozoans

Abietinaria is a genus of hydrozoans belonging to the family Sertulariidae.

The genus has almost cosmopolitan distribution.

== Species ==
Species:

- Abietinaria abietina (Linnaeus, 1758)
- Abietinaria alexanderi Nutting, 1904
- Abietinaria alternitheca (Kudelin, 1914)
- Abietinaria anguina (Trask, 1857)
- Abietinaria annulata (Kirchenpauer, 1884)
- Abietinaria compressa (Merezhkovskii, 1878)
- Abietinaria crassiparia Naumov, 1960
- Abietinaria cruciformis Antsulevich, 1987
- Abietinaria derbeki (Kudelin, 1913)
- Abietinaria elsaeoswaldae Stechow, 1923
- Abietinaria expansa Fraser, 1938
- Abietinaria filicula (Ellis & Solander, 1786)
- Abietinaria fusca (Johnston, 1847)
- Abietinaria gagarae Naumov, 1960
- Abietinaria gigantea (Clark, 1877)
- Abietinaria gracilis Nutting, 1904
- Abietinaria immersa Vervoort, 1993
- Abietinaria inconstans (Clark, 1877)
- Abietinaria interversa (Pictet & Bedot, 1900)
- Abietinaria juniperus Kirchenpauer, 1884
- Abietinaria kincaidi (Nutting, 1901)
- Abietinaria laevimarginata (Ritchie, 1907)
- Abietinaria macrotheca Naumov, 1960
- Abietinaria melo Kirchenpauer, 1884
- Abietinaria merkii Kirchenpauer, 1884
- Abietinaria pacifica Stechow, 1923
- Abietinaria pulchra (Nutting, 1904)
- Abietinaria raritheca Naumov, 1960
- Abietinaria rigida Fraser, 1911
- Abietinaria smirnowi (Kudelin, 1914)
- Abietinaria spasskii
- Abietinaria spiralis Naumov, 1960
- Abietinaria thuiarioides (Clark, 1877)
- Abietinaria thuiaroides (Clark, 1877)
- Abietinaria traski (Torrey, 1902)
- Abietinaria trigona Antsulevich, 1987
- Abietinaria turgida (Clark, 1877)
- Abietinaria variabilis (Clark, 1877)
