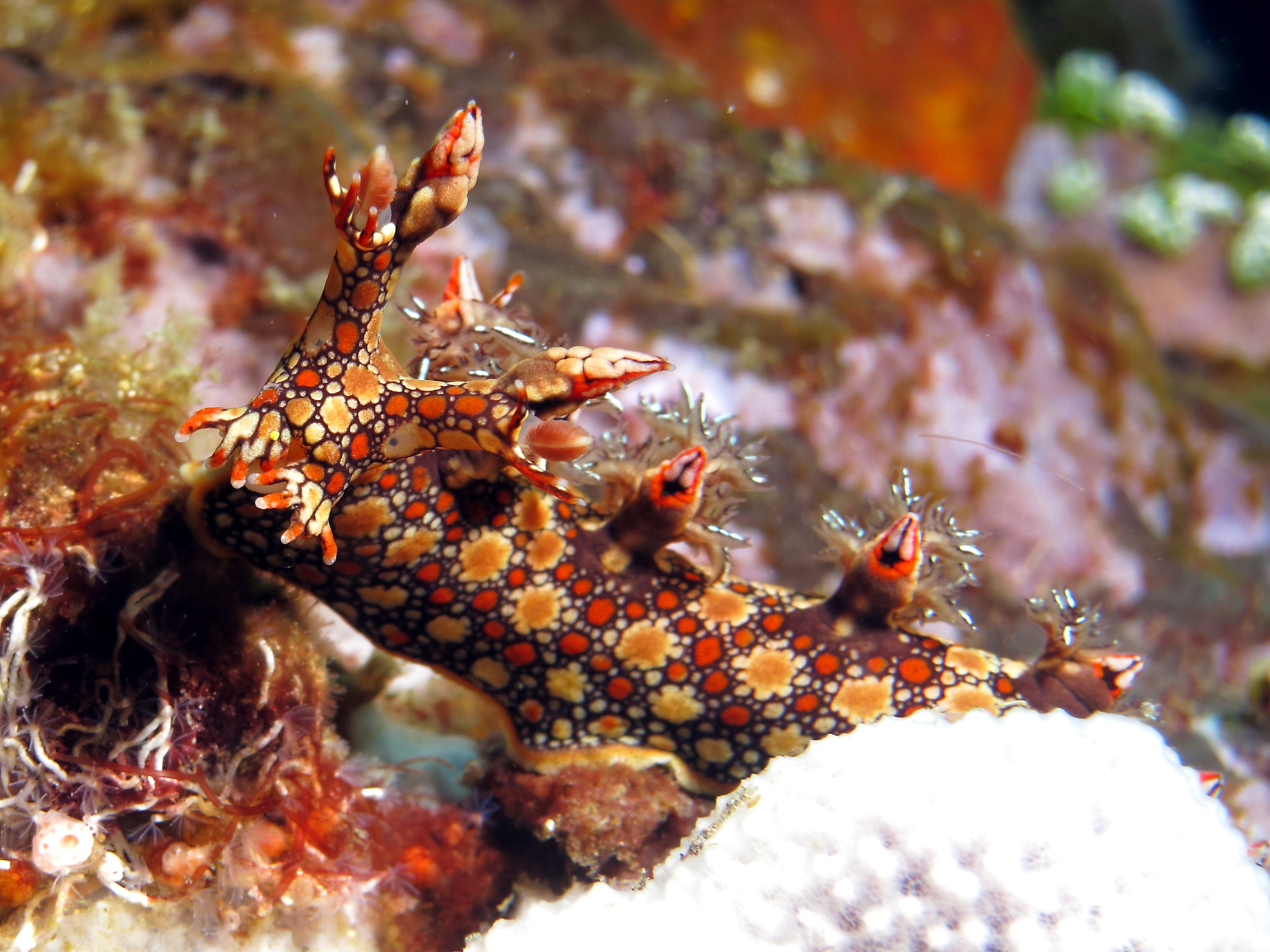

Scientific classification
- Kingdom: Animalia
- Phylum: Mollusca
- Class: Gastropoda
- Order: Nudibranchia
- Suborder: Dendronotacea
- Family: Bornellidae
- Genus: Bornella
- Species: B. anguilla

Binomial name
- Bornella anguilla Johnson, 1984

= Bornella anguilla =

Species of gastropod

Bornella anguilla is a species of sea slug, a nudibranch, a marine gastropod mollusk in the family Bornellidae. This species is widely distributed throughout the tropical waters of the Indo-West Pacific.

This species can grow up to a length of 8 cm.
