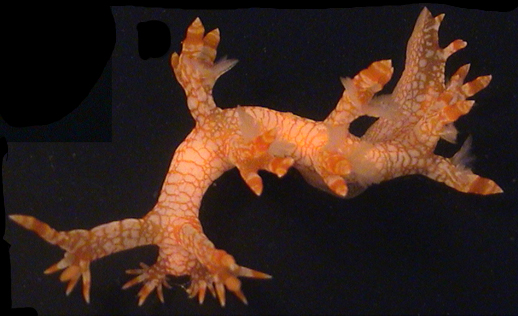
- Bornella stellifer

Scientific classification
- Domain: Eukaryota
- Kingdom: Animalia
- Phylum: Mollusca
- Class: Gastropoda
- Order: Nudibranchia
- Suborder: Cladobranchia
- Family: Bornellidae
- Genus: Bornella; Gray, 1850

Species
- See text

= Bornella =

Bornellidae

Genus of gastropods

Bornella is a genus of sea slugs, specifically dendronotid nudibranchs in the family Bornellidae.

There has not been much research on this genus. Their biology is mostly unknown, except that they seem to feed exclusively on hydroids.

== Distribution ==
These nudibranchs occur in the Indo-West Pacific. In addition there is one species in the tropical eastern Pacific, and one species in the western Atlantic.

== Description ==
Their body is covered with cerata-like dorsal and lateral outgrowths, with finger-like branches. They have an attached cluster of gills. Their rounded head shows on each side of the mouth a tentacle, with tiny finger-like papillae. The sheath of the rhinophore stands high and resembles the dorsal processes. Feeds on hydroids.

The various species differ in their color pattern and their number of dorsal and lateral outgrowths and the number of branches on their rhinophore sheath.

== Anatomy ==
These nudibranchs are characterized by an unpaired oral gland.

In their genital system, the male duct is separate from the female duct.

== Species ==
Species within this genus include:

- Bornella anguilla Johnson, 1984
- Bornella calcarata Mörch, 1863
- Bornella dotoides Pola, Rudman & Gosliner, 2009
- Bornella excepta Bergh, 1884
- Bornella hermanni Angas, 1864 (synonym : Bornella. japonica Baba, 1949 )
- Bornella irvingi Edmunds and Preece, 1996
- Bornella johnsonorum Pola, Rudman & Gosliner, 2009
- Bornella pele Pola, Rudman & Gosliner, 2009
- Bornella sarape Bertsch, 1980.
- Bornella simplex Eliot, 1904
- Bornella stellifer (Adams and Reeve in Adams, 1848) (synonyms : Bornella hancockana Kelaart, 1859 , Bornella arborescens Pease, 1871 , Bornella caledonica Crosse, 1875 , Bornella marmorata Collingwood, 1881 )
- Bornella valdae Pola, Rudman & Gosliner, 2009

Invalid species names include:

- B. semperi Crosse 1875 (nomen nudum)
