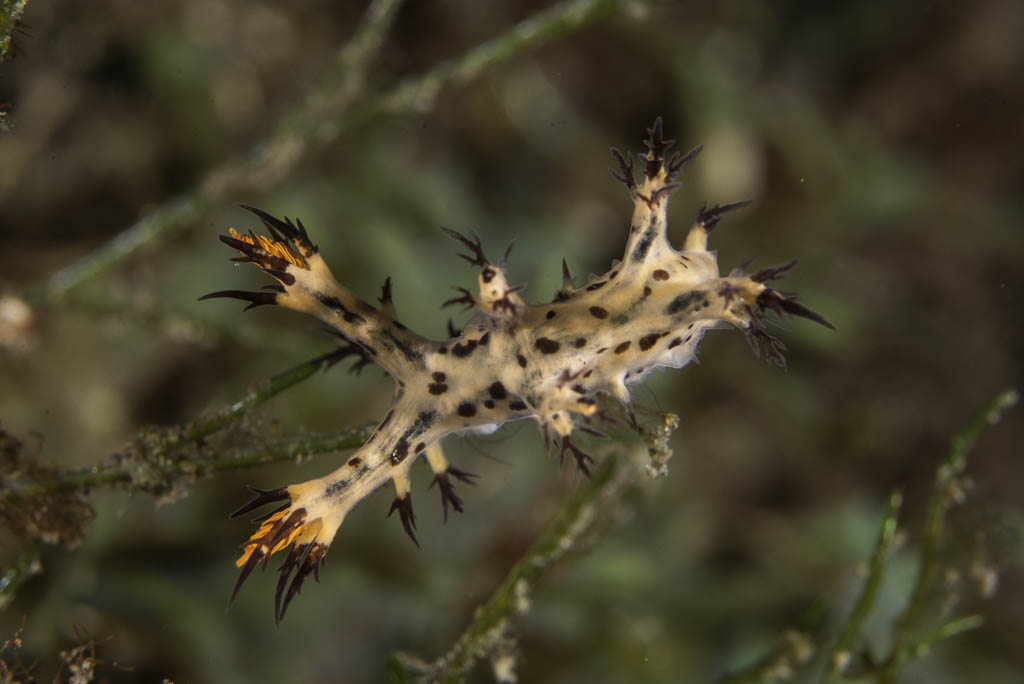
- The nudibranch Cabangus regius, Bali, Indonesia.

Scientific classification
- Kingdom: Animalia
- Phylum: Mollusca
- Class: Gastropoda
- Order: Nudibranchia
- Suborder: Dendronotacea
- Family: Dendronotidae
- Genus: Cabangus
- Species: C. regius

Binomial name
- Cabangus regius (Pola & Stout, 2008)

= Cabangus regius =

Species of gastropod

Cabangus regius is a species of sea slug, a dendronotid nudibranch, a shell-less marine gastropod mollusc in the family Dendronotidae.

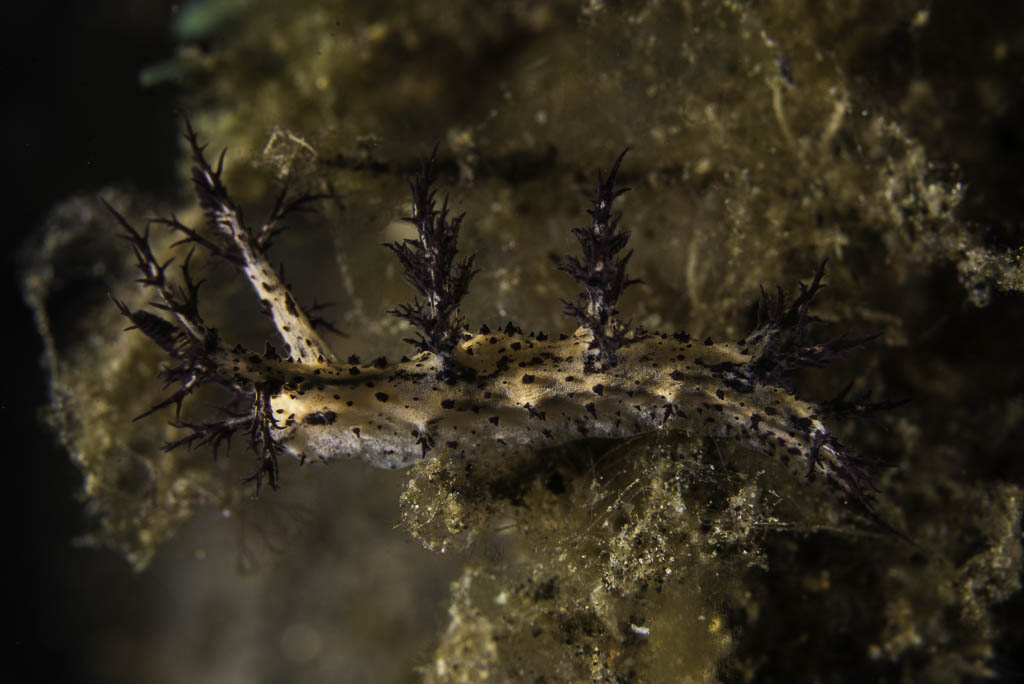
The nudibranch Cabangus cf. regius, Pulau Sangyeang, Indonesia. Form with pointed, raised body tubercles.

== Distribution ==
This species was described from Bunaken Island, Manado, Celebes Sea, Sulawesi, Indonesia. It has been reported from the Philippines, several places in Indonesia and Sabah, Malaysia.

== Description ==
This is a small species of dendronotid, growing to a maximum size of 30 mm. The body is translucent white with a surface tinged with milky white to pink. The tips of the dorsal appendages and rhinophore sheath processes are dark brown and there are rounded spots of the same colour scattered over the back and sides of the body. The rhinophore clubs are bright orange. Some specimens have extensive orange pigment on the body. A similar animal with raised, pointed tubercles on the body and dark brown rhinophore clubs is probably a distinct species.
