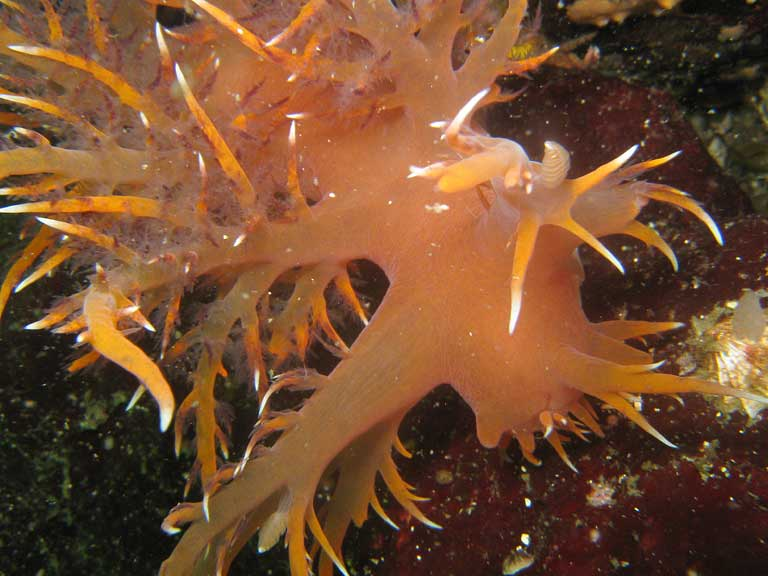
- Dendronotus iris

Scientific classification
- Kingdom: Animalia
- Phylum: Mollusca
- Class: Gastropoda
- Order: Nudibranchia
- Suborder: Dendronotacea
- Family: Dendronotidae
- Genus: Dendronotus; Alder & Hancock, 1845

Type species
- Doris arborescens Müller O.F., 1776

Species
- See text

Synonyms
- Amphitrite Ascanius, 1774 (Invalid: junior homonym of Amphitrite Müller, 1771 [Annelida]); Campaspe Bergh, 1863; Pseudobornella Baba, 1932

= Dendronotus =

Genus of gastropods

Dendronotus is a genus of nudibranchs in the superfamily Tritonioidea.

This genus is within the clade Cladobranchia (according to the taxonomy of the Gastropoda by Bouchet & Rocroi, 2005).

== Description ==
Dendronotus has an elongated, broad body, with 4 to 8 pairs of branched cerata on the notum. Animals in this genus have an obvious oral veil with 2 to 5 extensions. These extensions may be branched. Smaller unbranched extensions are found around the mouth. The rhinophores are surrounded by a sheath and the sheath itself has branched extensions. A large extension is found on the side at the base of each rhinophore. The anal opening occurs between the first and second set of dorsal cerata on the right side of the body.

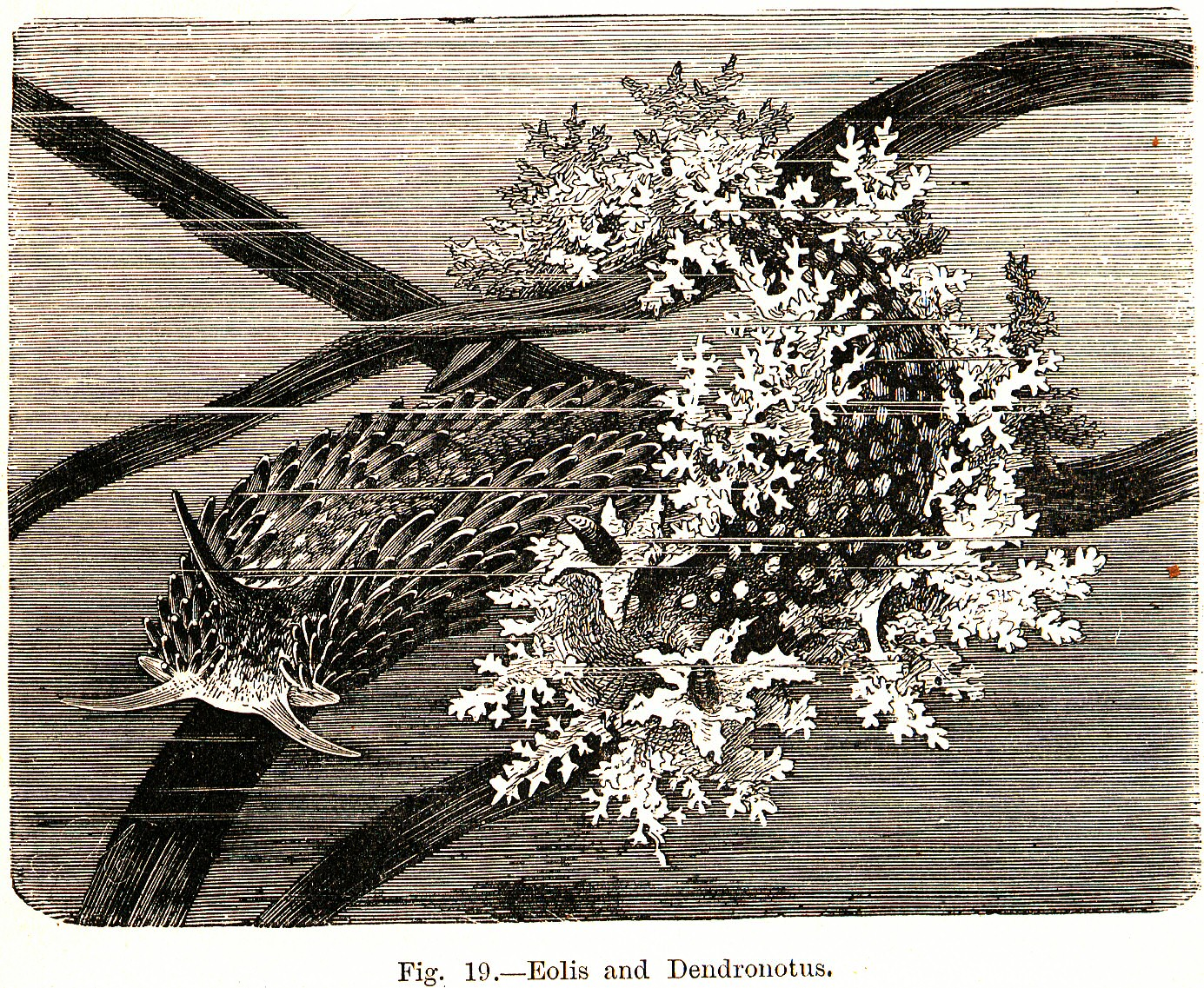
Woodcut of marine nudibranchs Eolis and Dendronotus

== Diet ==
This genus feeds on hydroids, as reflected by its serrated radula.

== Species ==
Species within the genus Dendronotus include:

- Dendronotus albopunctatus Robilliard, 1972
- Dendronotus albus MacFarland, 1966 (synonym: Dendronotus diversicolor Robilliard, 1972)
- Dendronotus arcticus Korshunova, Sanamyan, Zimina, Fletcher & Martynov, 2016
- Dendronotus bathyvela Martynov, Fujiwara, Tsuchida, R. Nakano, N. Sanamyan, K. Sanamyan, Fletcher & Korshunova, 2020
- Dendronotus claguei Valdés, Lundsten & N. G. Wilson, 2018
- Dendronotus comteti Valdés & Bouchet, 1998
- Dendronotus dalli Bergh, 1879
- Dendronotus elegans A. E. Verrill, 1880
- Dendronotus europaeus Korshunova, Martynov, Bakken & Picton, 2017
- Dendronotus frondosus (Ascanius, 1774) (synonyms: D. arborescens, D. reynoldsi)
- Dendronotus gracilis Baba, 1949
- Dendronotus iris J.G. Cooper, 1863 (synonym D. giganteus)
- Dendronotus jamsteci Martynov, Fujiwara, Tsuchida, R. Nakano, N. Sanamyan, K. Sanamyan, Fletcher & Korshunova, 2020
- Dendronotus kalikal Ekimova, Korshunova, Schepetov, Neretina, Sanamyan & Martynov, 2015
- Dendronotus kamchaticus Ekimova, Korshunova, Schepetov, Neretina, Sanamyan & Martynov, 2015
- Dendronotus lacteus (W. Thompson, 1840)
- Dendronotus nordenskioeldi Korshunova, Bakken, Grøtan, Johnson, Lundin & Martynov, 2020
- Dendronotus patricki Stout, N. G. Wilson & Valdés, 2011
- Dendronotus primorjensis Martynov, Sanamyan & Korshunova, 2015
- Dendronotus robilliardi Korshunova, Sanamyan, Zimina, Fletcher & Martynov, 2016
- Dendronotus robustus Verrill, 1870
- Dendronotus rufus O'Donoghue, 1921
- Dendronotus subramosus MacFarland, 1966
- Dendronotus velifer G. O. Sars, 1878
- Dendronotus venustus MacFarland, 1966
- Dendronotus yrjargul Korshunova, Bakken, Grøtan, Johnson, Lundin & Martynov, 2020
- Dendronotus zakuro Martynov, Fujiwara, Tsuchida, R. Nakano, N. Sanamyan, K. Sanamyan, Fletcher & Korshunova, 2020

Species brought into synonymy

- Dendronotus diversicolor Robilliard, 1972: synonym of Dendronotus albus MacFarland, 1966
- Dendronotus luteolus Lafont, 1871: synonym of Dendronotus frondosus (Ascanius, 1774)
- Dendronotus nanus Marcus & Marcus, 1967: synonym of Dendronotus iris J. G. Cooper, 1863
- Dendronotus stellifer A. Adams & Reeve [in A. Adams], 1848: synonym of Bornella stellifer (A. Adams & Reeve [in A. Adams], 1848)
- Dendronotus tenellus A. Adams & Reeve [in A. Adams], 1848: synonym of Bornella stellifer (A. Adams & Reeve [in A. Adams], 1848)
