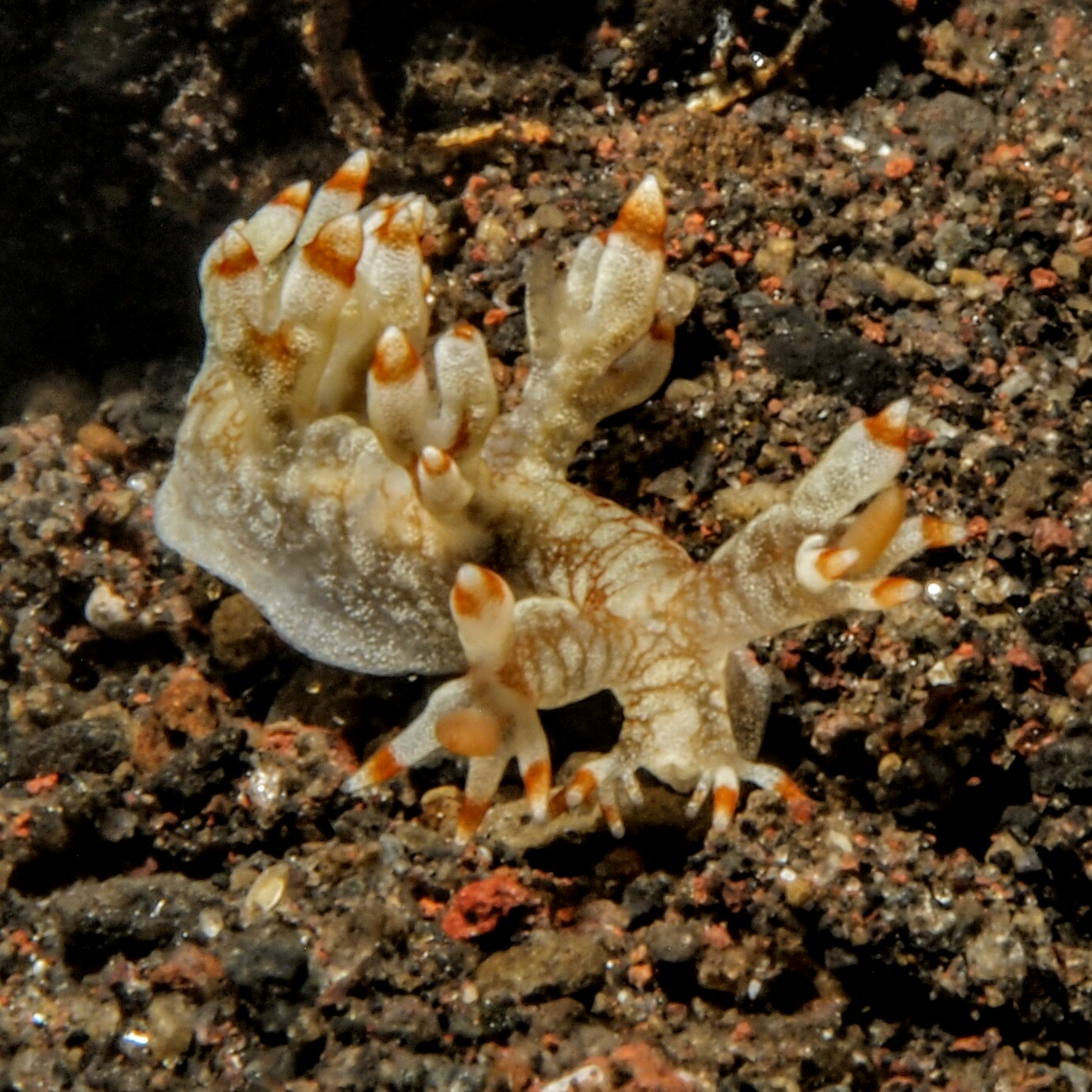
- Bornella stellifer
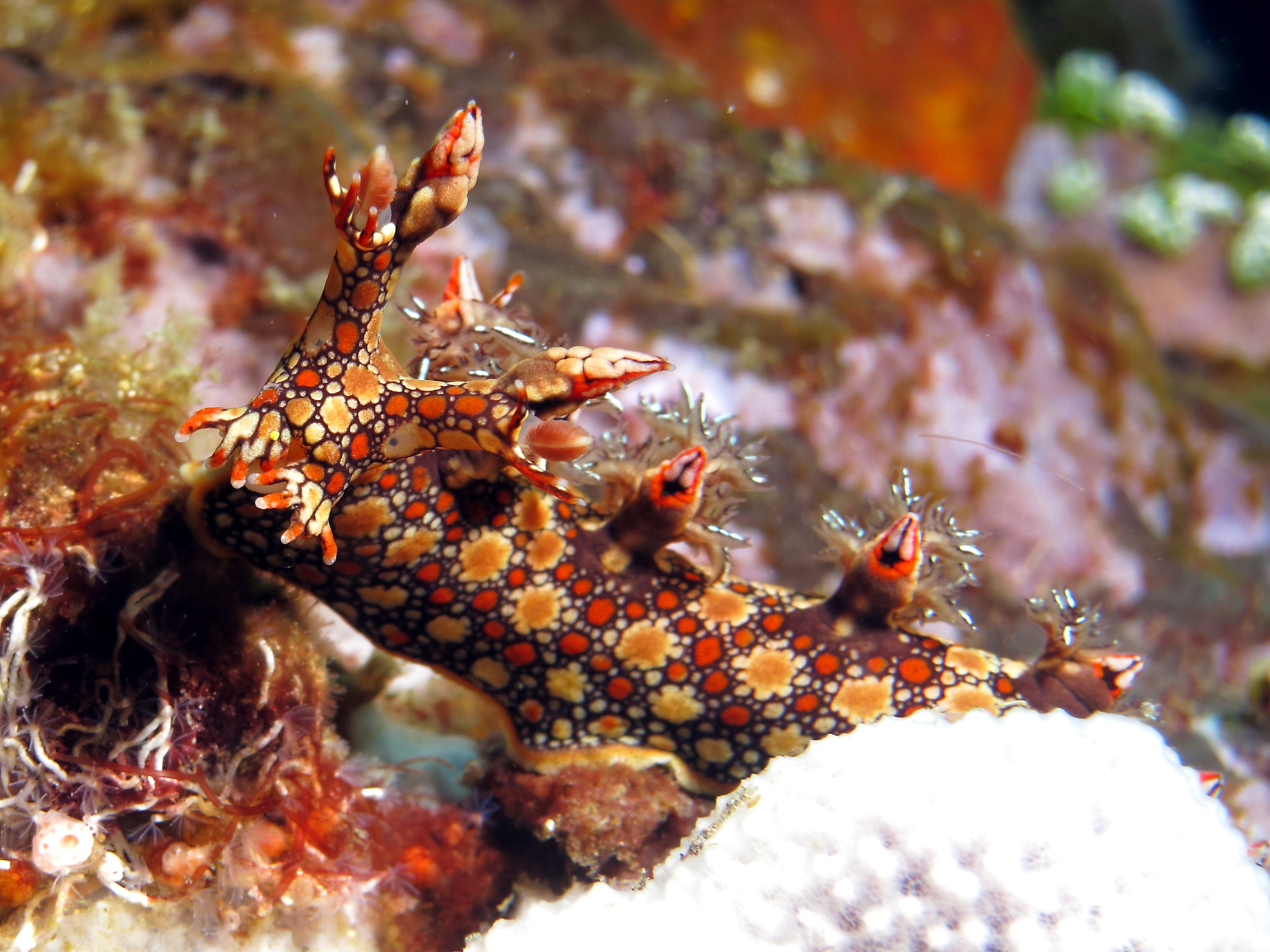
- Bornella anguilla

Scientific classification
- Kingdom: Animalia
- Phylum: Mollusca
- Class: Gastropoda
- Order: Nudibranchia
- Suborder: Dendronotacea
- Superfamily: Dendronotoidea
- Family: Bornellidae; Bergh, 1874

Genera
- See Genera

= Bornellidae =

Family of gastropods

Bornellidae is a family of nudibranchs, shell-less marine gastropod molluscs or sea slugs, in the superfamily Dendronotoidea.

== Description ==
Nudibranch species within the Bornellidae family have elongated bodies, with pairs of cerata-like dorsal and lateral appendages, with finger-like branches, running along the length of the body. Each of these appendages has an attached cluster of gills. Their rounded head has a tentacle on either side of the mouth, with tiny finger-like papillae. The rhinophores on the head resemble the dorsal appendages.

Nudibranchs within this family are believed to feed exclusively on hydroids.

== Genera ==
The following genus is recognised in the family Bornellidae:

- Bornella Gray, 1850

Once placed inside this family, molecular phylogenetic analyses now recover the genus Pseudobornella as a member of Dendronotidae.
