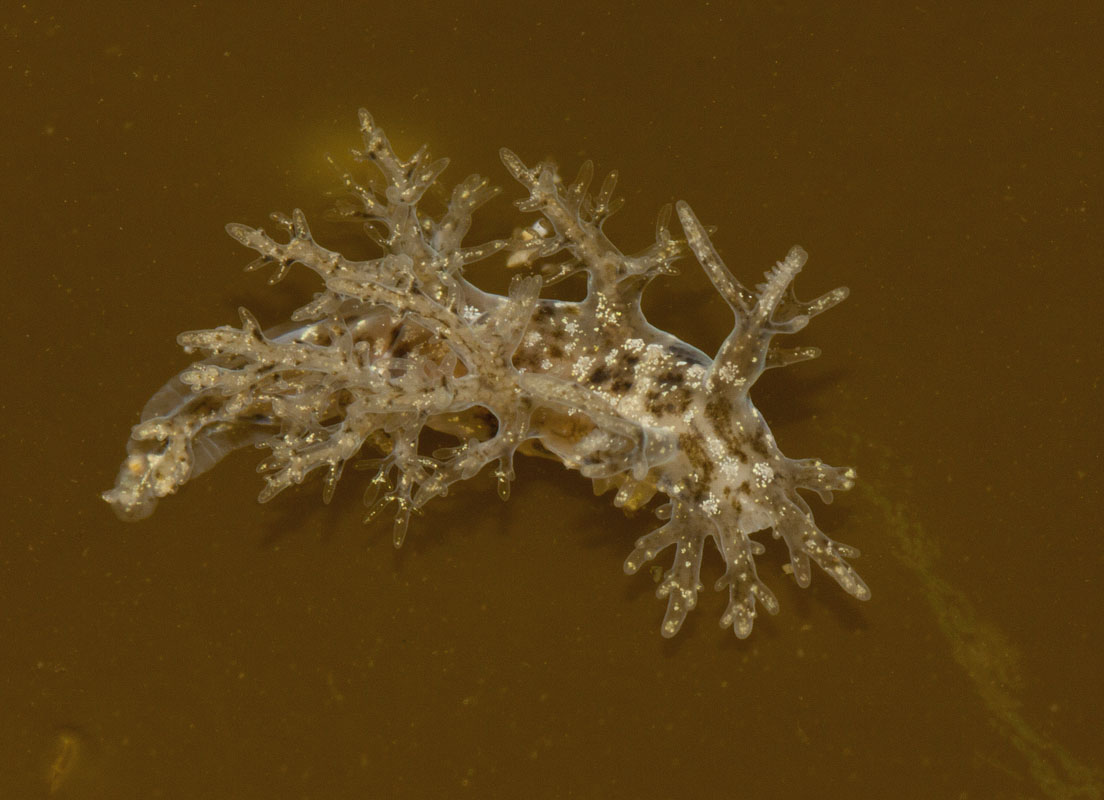
- Dendronotus venustus from Morro Strand State Beach, Morro Bay, California

Scientific classification
- Kingdom: Animalia
- Phylum: Mollusca
- Class: Gastropoda
- Order: Nudibranchia
- Suborder: Dendronotacea
- Family: Dendronotidae
- Genus: Dendronotus
- Species: D. venustus

Binomial name
- Dendronotus venustus (MacFarland, 1966)

= Dendronotus venustus =

Species of gastropod

Dendronotus venustus is a species of sea slug, a dendronotid nudibranch, a shell-less marine gastropod mollusc in the family Dendronotidae.

== Distribution ==
This species can be found on the Pacific coast of North America. It was formerly confused with the North Atlantic species Dendronotus frondosus.

== Feeding habits ==
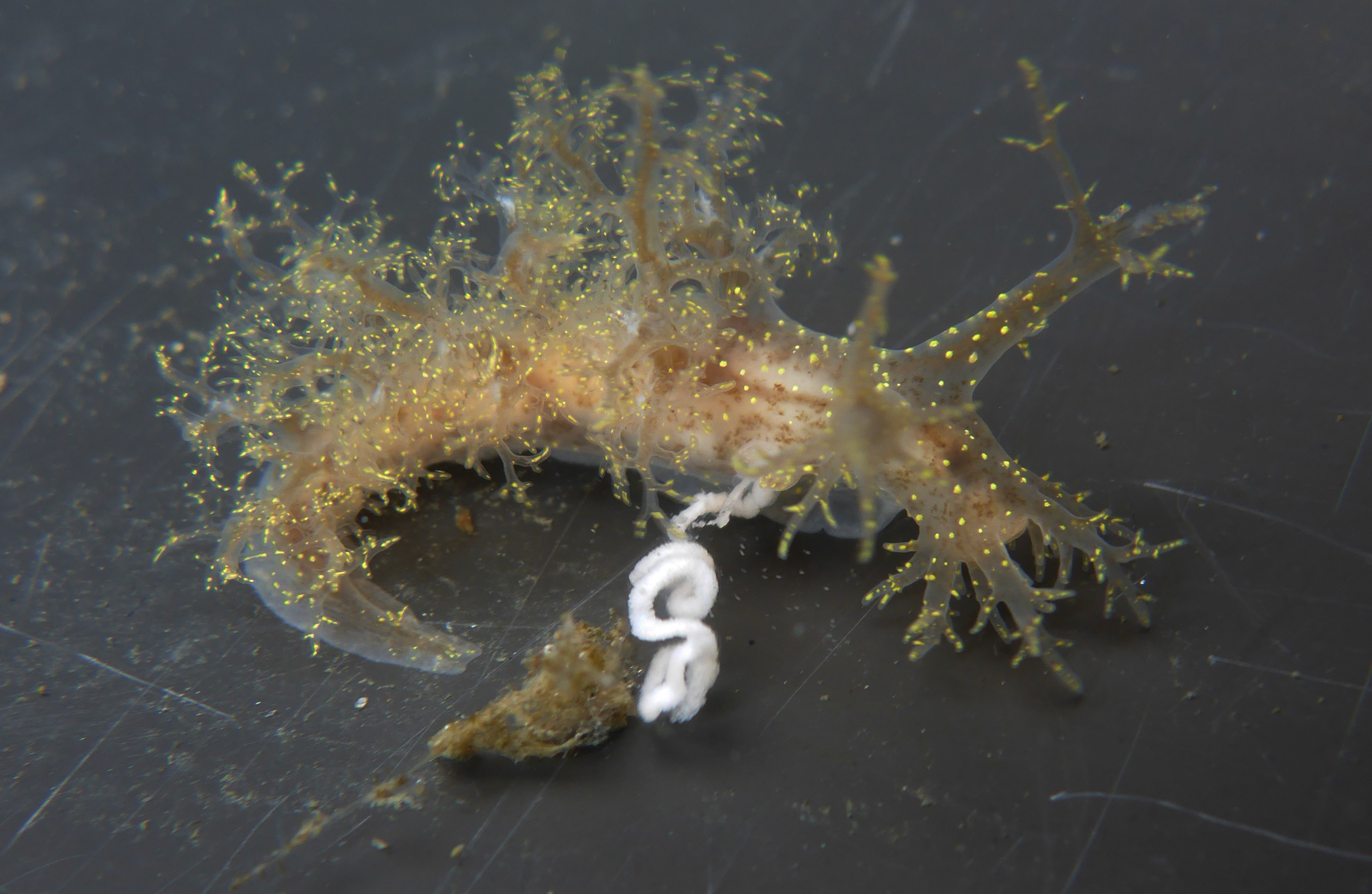
Dendronotus venustus depositing eggs (Princeton Harbor, California)

This species feeds on hydroids.
