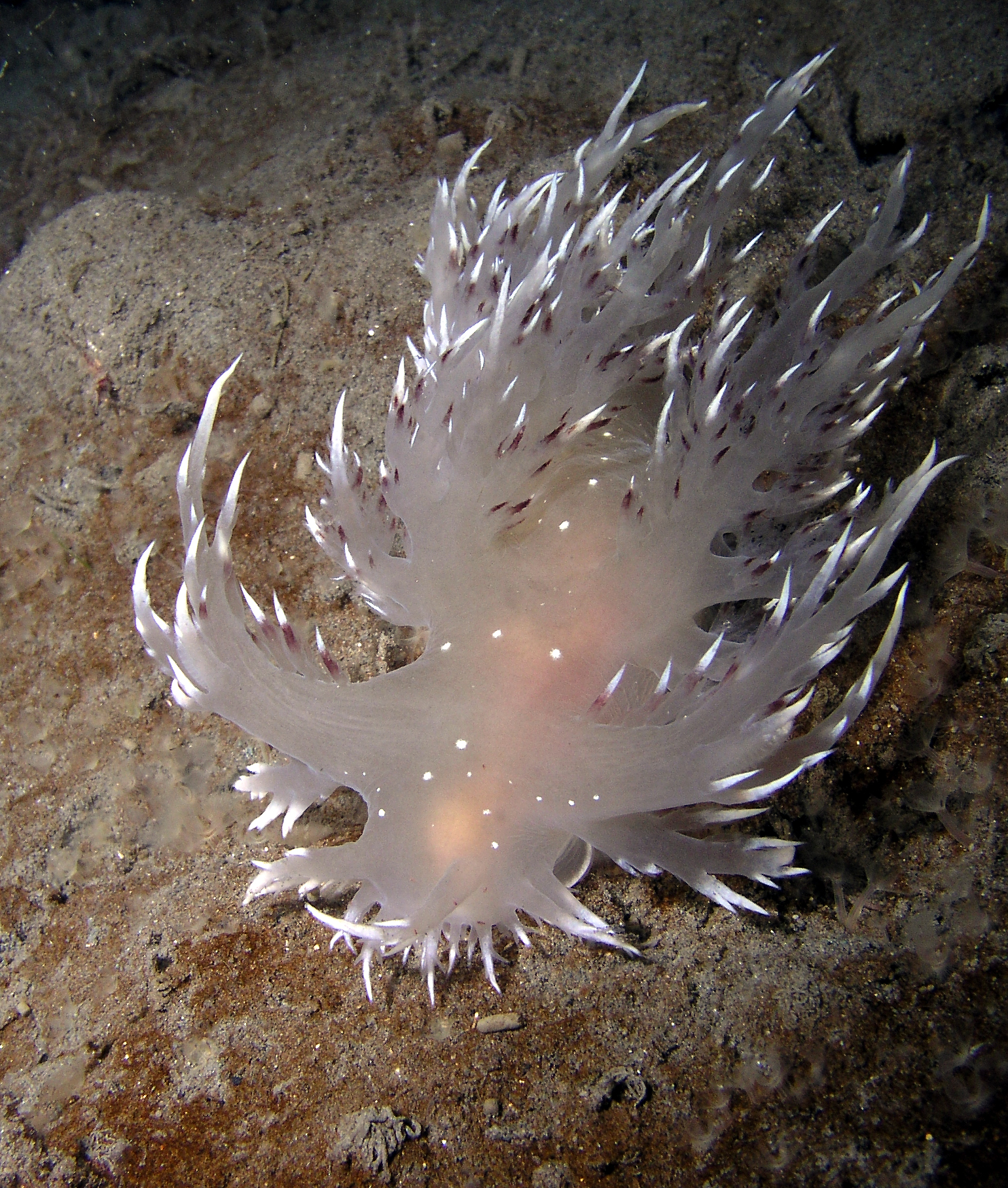

Scientific classification
- Kingdom: Animalia
- Phylum: Mollusca
- Class: Gastropoda
- Order: Nudibranchia
- Suborder: Dendronotacea
- Family: Dendronotidae
- Genus: Dendronotus
- Species: D. iris

Binomial name
- Dendronotus iris (Cooper, 1863)

= Dendronotus iris =

Species of gastropod

Dendronotus iris, also known as the rainbow nudibranch, is a species of sea slug, a dendronotid nudibranch, a shell-less marine gastropod mollusc in the family Dendronotidae.

== Distribution ==
This species was described from Santa Barbara, California. It can be found along the west coast of North America from Unalaska Island, Alaska to Cabo San Lucas, Baja California.

== Description ==
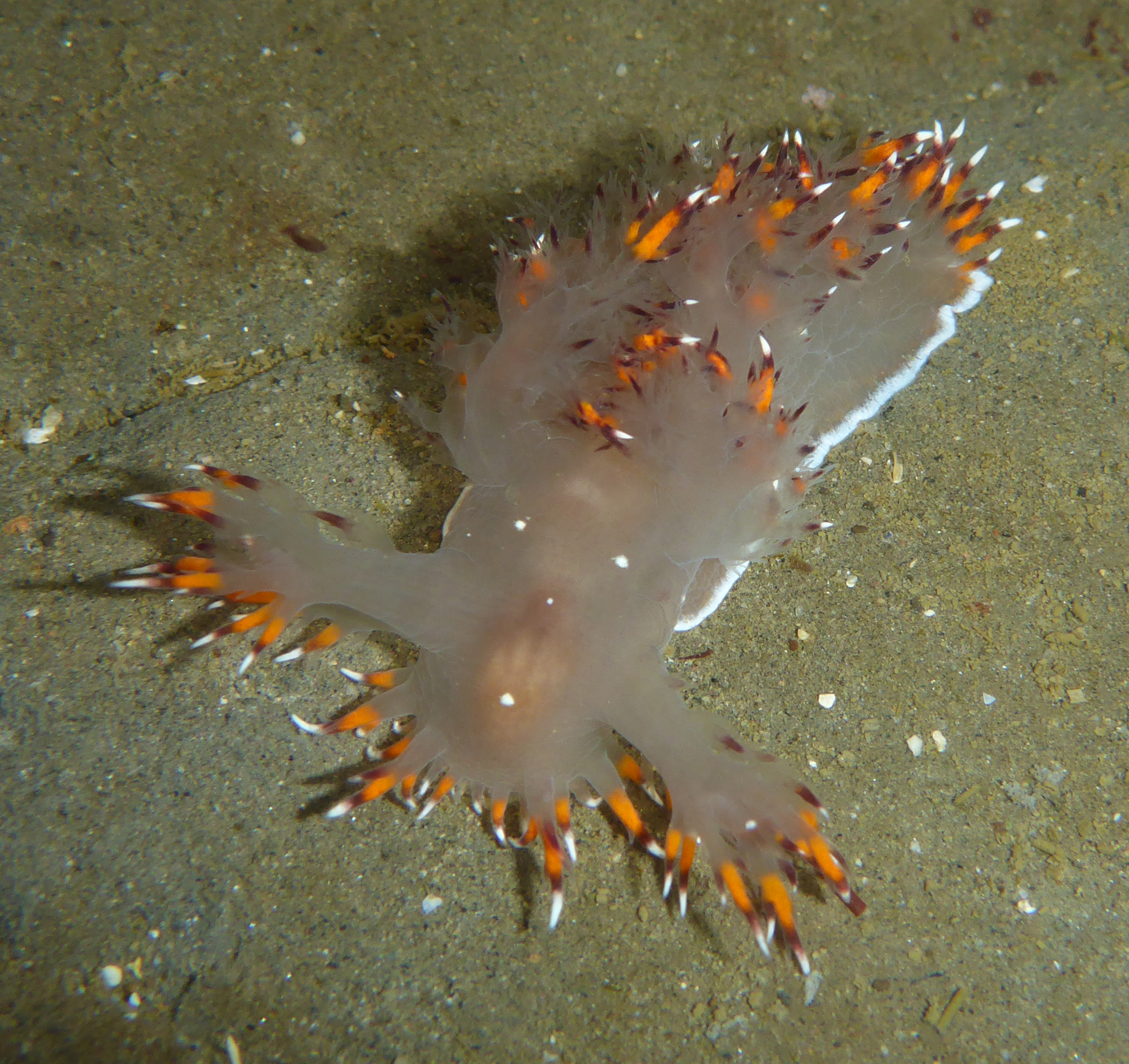
Dendronotus iris (juvenile) from Pillar Point, California

Dendronotus iris can grow to about 30 cm but is usually about 10 cm. The colour of this species is highly variable. It can range from translucent white or gray, to orange or red. It can also have white spots or scattered brownish patches. Distinctive features include the stalk of the rhinophore sheath having a vertical row of three to six small branched processes on its posterior side, and the foot being edged in white, although this may be partially absent in some specimens. The oral veil has four paired processes. The branching gills may be tipped with white, orange, yellow, or purple.

== Diet ==
This species feeds on the sea sun, a burrowing sea anemone of the species Pachycerianthus fimbriatus.
