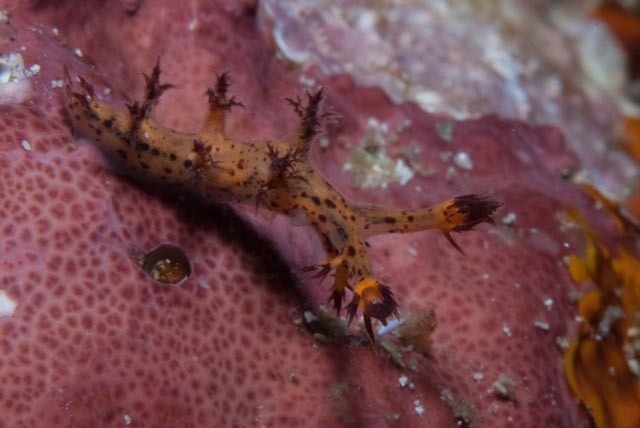
- Cabangus regius, Philippines

Scientific classification
- Kingdom: Animalia
- Phylum: Mollusca
- Class: Gastropoda
- Order: Nudibranchia
- Suborder: Dendronotacea
- Family: Dendronotidae
- Genus: Cabangus; Korshunova, Bakken, Grøtan, Johnson, Lundin & Martynov, 2020

= Cabangus =

Genus of sea slugs

Cabangus is a genus of gastropods belonging to the family Dendronotidae.

The species of this genus are found in Malesia.

Species:

- Cabangus noahi (Pola & Stout, 2008)
- Cabangus regius (Pola & Stout, 2008)
