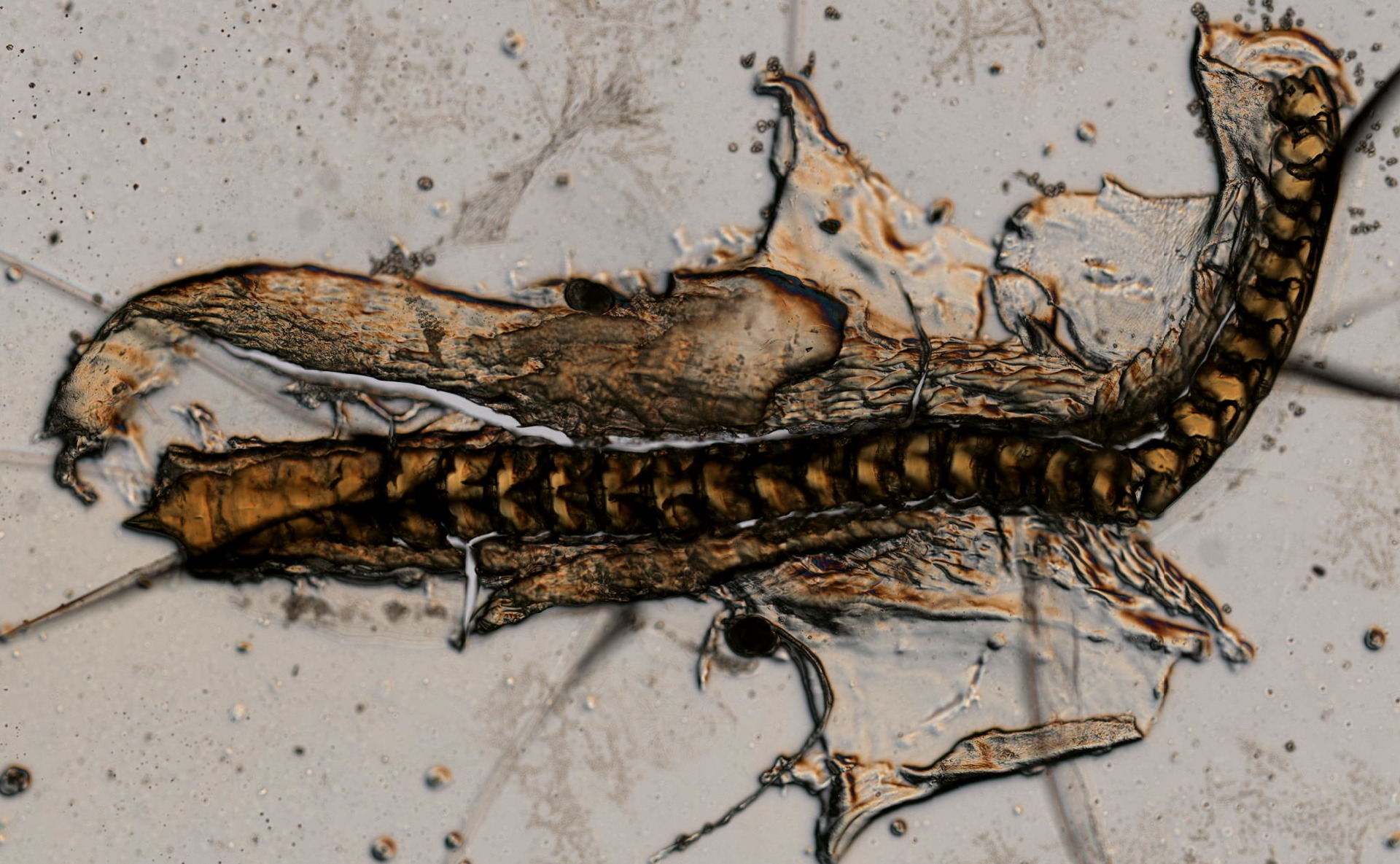

Scientific classification
- Kingdom: Animalia
- Phylum: Mollusca
- Class: Gastropoda
- Order: Nudibranchia
- Suborder: Dendronotacea
- Family: Dendronotidae
- Genus: Dendronotus
- Species: D. robustus

Binomial name
- Dendronotus robustus A. E. Verrill, 1870

= Dendronotus robustus =

Species of gastropod

Dendronotus robustus is a species of sea slug, a dendronotid nudibranch, a shell-less marine gastropod mollusc in the family Dendronotidae.

== Distribution ==
This species was described from Whale Cove, Grand Menan, 44.773778°N 66.760537°W on the Atlantic Ocean coast of North America. It is an Arctic species which also occurs in Svalbard and northern Norway.

== Description ==
Dendronotus robustus is a large dendronotid nudibranch, growing to at least 150 mm in length. The body is translucent red-brown. There are opaque white spots on the sides and back of the body, velar processes and rhinophore sheaths. The body shape is similar to Dendronotus albopunctatus, with a broad foot.
