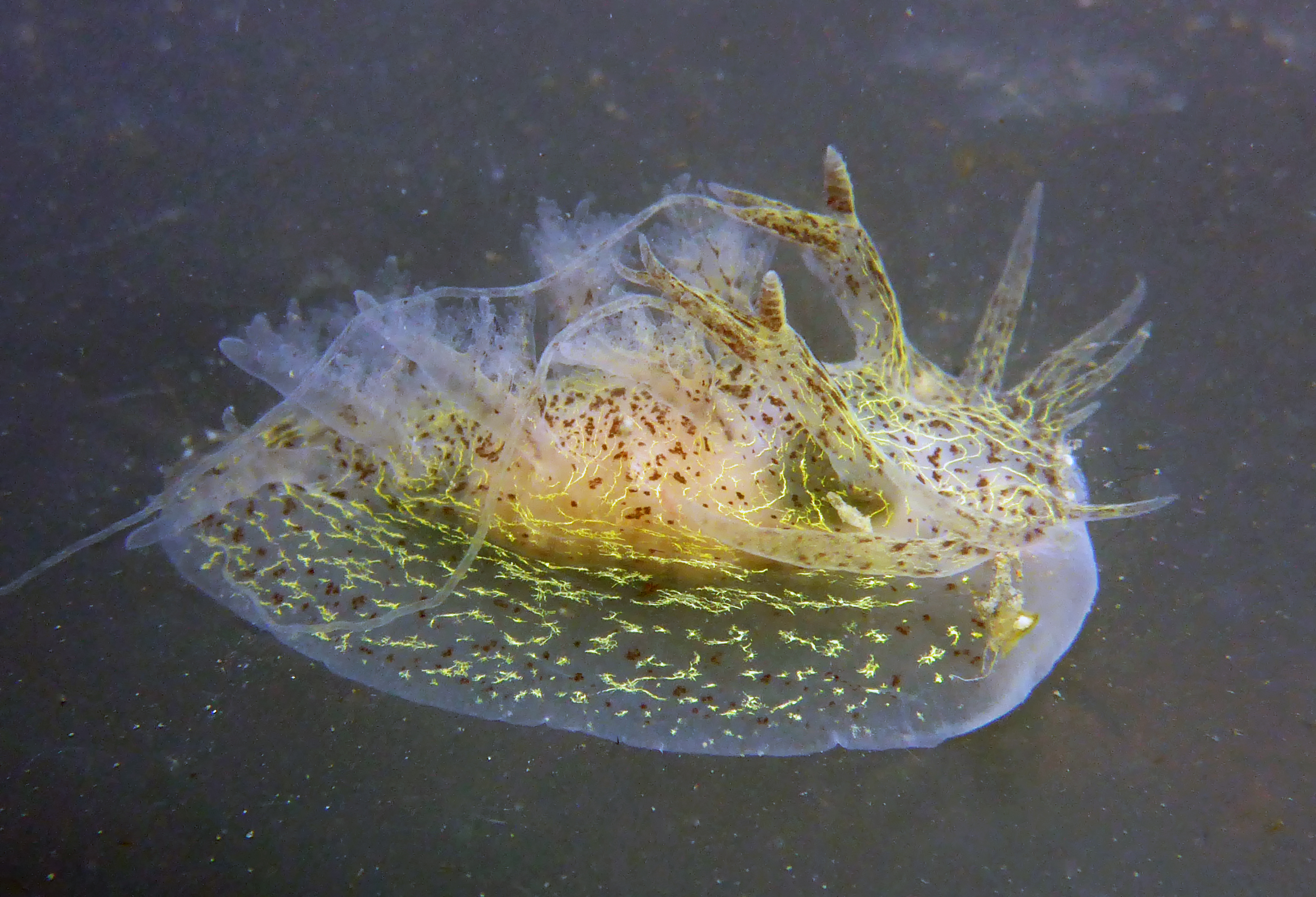
- Pseudobornella orientalis from San Francisco Bay, California

Scientific classification
- Kingdom: Animalia
- Phylum: Mollusca
- Class: Gastropoda
- Order: Nudibranchia
- Suborder: Dendronotacea
- Family: Dendronotidae
- Genus: Pseudobornella
- Species: P. orientalis

Binomial name
- Pseudobornella orientalis Baba, 1932

Synonyms
- Dendronotus orientalis (Baba, 1932)

= Pseudobornella orientalis =

Species of gastropod

Pseudobornella orientalis is a species of sea slug, a dendronotid nudibranch, a shell-less marine gastropod mollusc in the family Dendronotidae.

== Distribution ==
This species was described from Misaki Marine Biological Station, Moroiso, Japan. It has been reported from the Philippines and China. In March and April 2016, a group of 16 breeding Pseudobornella orientalis were reported from the San Francisco Bay in Redwood City, California. A specimen from Daisong Bay, near Xiamen, China was sequenced for the 16S ribosomal RNA and Histone H3 genes and found to cluster within the genus Dendronotus as currently constituted prompting the change of name from Pseudobornella orientalis to Dendronotus orientalis. A 2020 revision of the family Dendronotidae reversed this decision, showing that the Indo-Pacific species previously placed in Dendronotus were better placed in a new genus Cabangus.

== Description ==
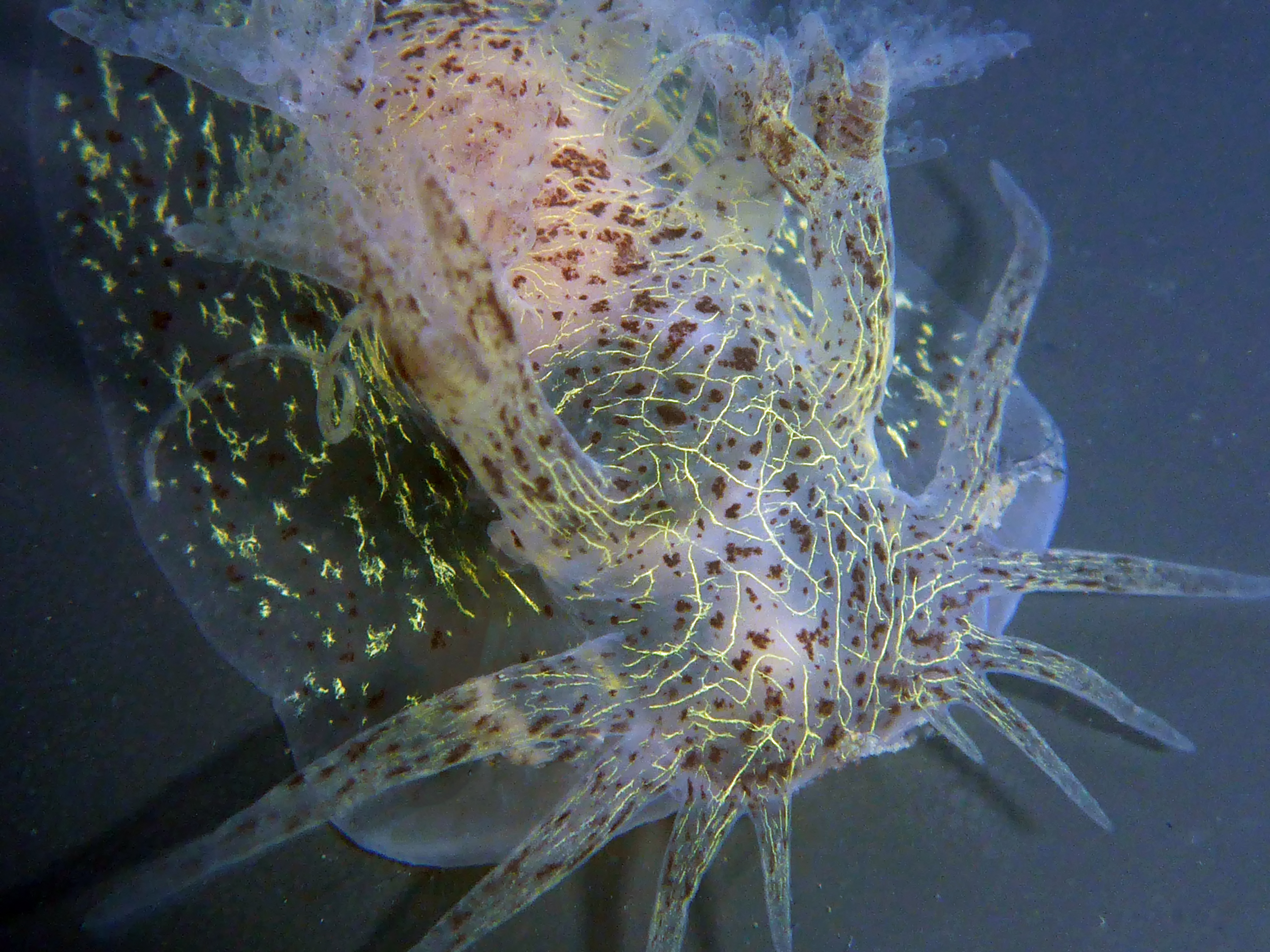
Pseudobornella orientalis

The morphology of this species is redescribed in detail by Pola et al. (2009).
