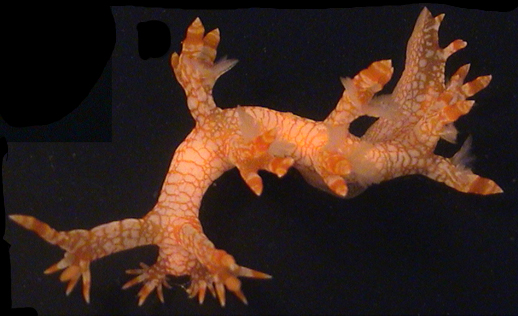

Scientific classification
- Kingdom: Animalia
- Phylum: Mollusca
- Class: Gastropoda
- Order: Nudibranchia
- Suborder: Dendronotacea
- Family: Bornellidae
- Genus: Bornella
- Species: B. stellifer

Binomial name
- Bornella stellifer (Adams & Reeve in Adams, 1848)

Synonyms
- Bornella hancockana Kelaart, 1859; Bornella arborescens Pease, 1871; Bornella caledonica Crosse, 1875; Bornella marmorata Collingwood, 1881

= Bornella stellifer =

Species of gastropod

Bornella stellifer is a species of colorful sea slug, a nudibranch, a marine gastropod mollusk in the family Bornellidae.
