= Abietinaria inconstans =

Scientific classification
- Domain: Eukaryota
- Kingdom: Animalia
- Phylum: Cnidaria
- Class: Hydrozoa
- Order: Leptothecata
- Family: Sertulariidae
- Genus: Abietinaria
- Species: A. inconstans

Binomial name
- Abietinaria inconstans (Clark, 1877)

Synonyms
- Abietinaria amphora Nutting, 1904

Species of marine animal

Abietinaria inconstans is a species of cnidarian belonging to the family Sertulariidae.

The species is found in Northern Pacific Ocean.
