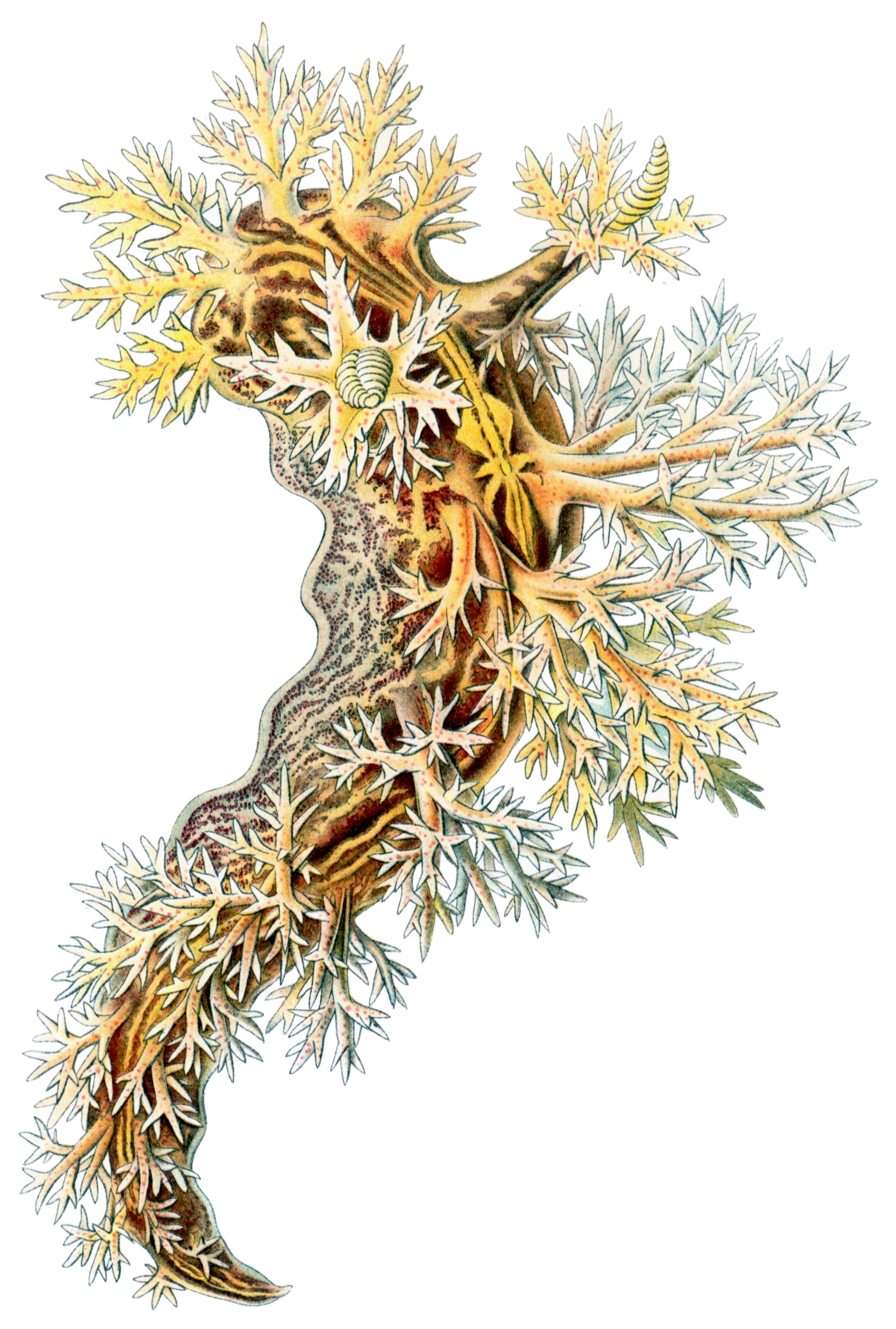
- Drawing of Dendronotus frondosus from Kunstformen der Natur (1904)

Scientific classification
- Kingdom: Animalia
- Phylum: Mollusca
- Class: Gastropoda
- Order: Nudibranchia
- Suborder: Dendronotacea
- Family: Dendronotidae
- Genus: Dendronotus
- Species: D. frondosus

Binomial name
- Dendronotus frondosus (Ascanius, 1774)

Synonyms
- Amphitrite frondosa Ascanius, 1774 (original combination); Doris arborescens O. F. Müller, 1776; Tritonia arborescens (O. F. Müller, 1776); Doris cervina Gmelin, 1791; Tritonia cervina (Gmelin, 1791); Tritonia ascanii Möller, 1842; Tritonia felina Alder & Hancock, 1842; Tritonia pulchella Alder & Hancock, 1842; Campaspe pusilla Bergh, 1863; Campaspe major Bergh, 1886

= Dendronotus frondosus =

Species of gastropod

Dendronotus frondosus, sometimes known by the common name frond eolis or bushy backed nudibranch, is a species of sea slug, specifically a dendronotid nudibranch, a marine gastropod mollusc in the family Dendronotidae.

== Distribution ==
This species was described from Norway. A specimen from Norway has been designated as a neotype. This species has been reported from the north-east and north-west Atlantic Ocean. Records from the Pacific Ocean are now known to be distinct species.

== Description ==
The size of the body attains 100 mm.
