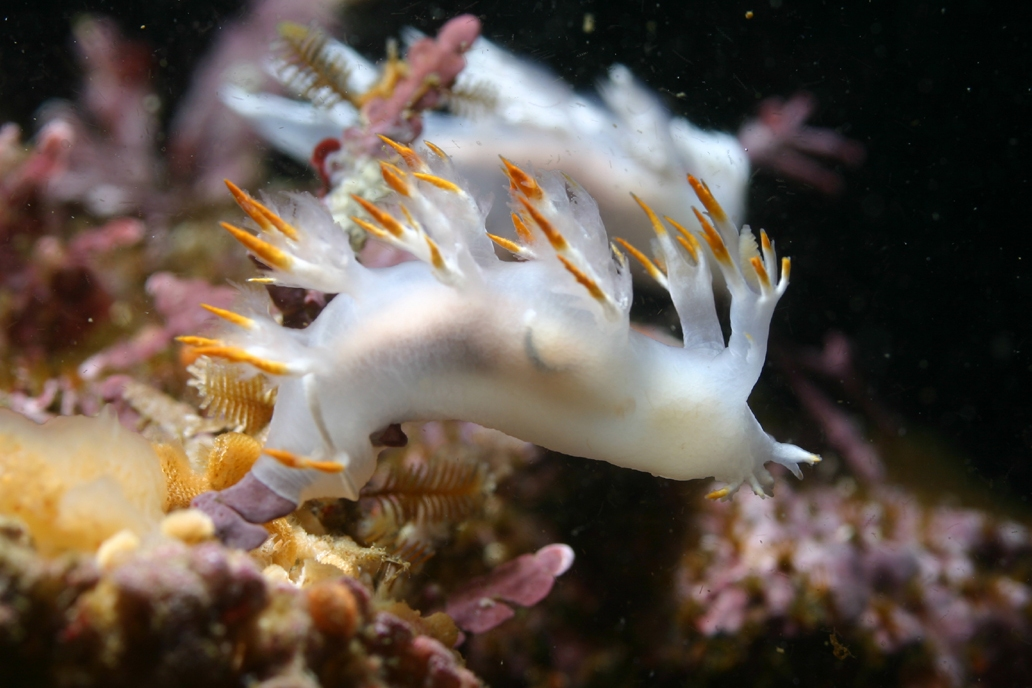
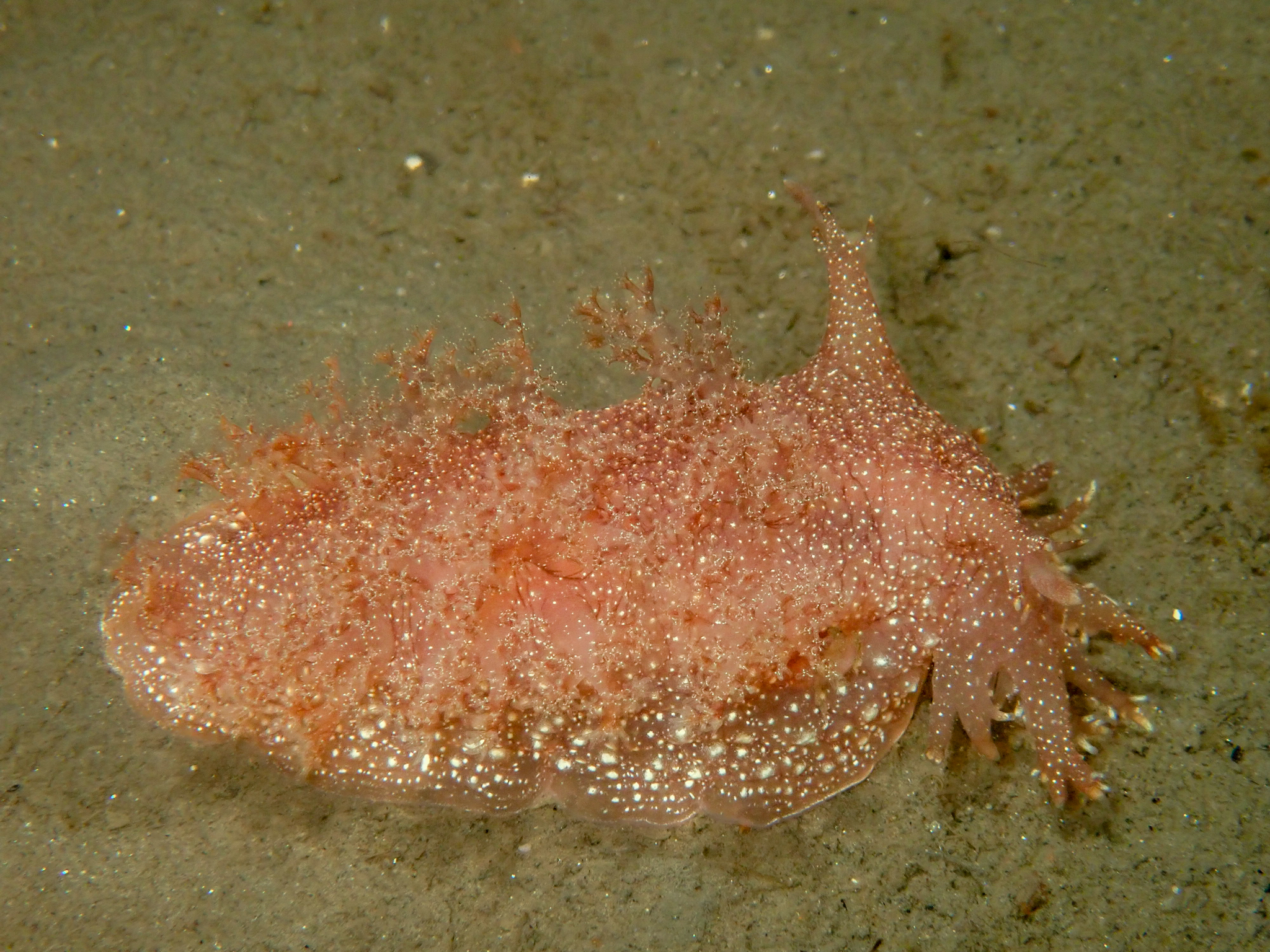
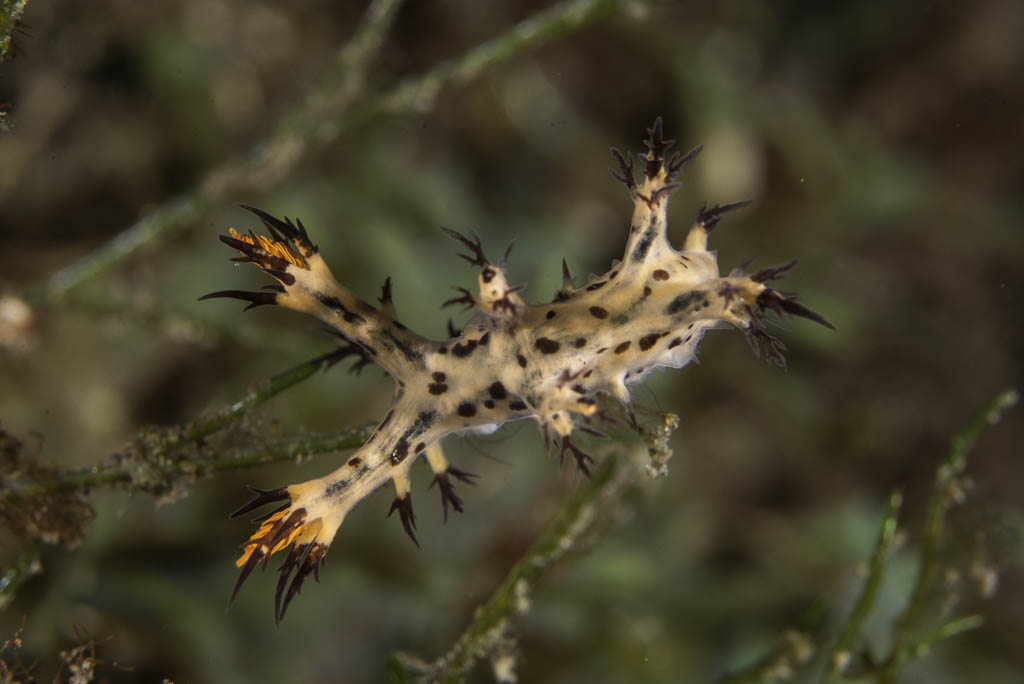
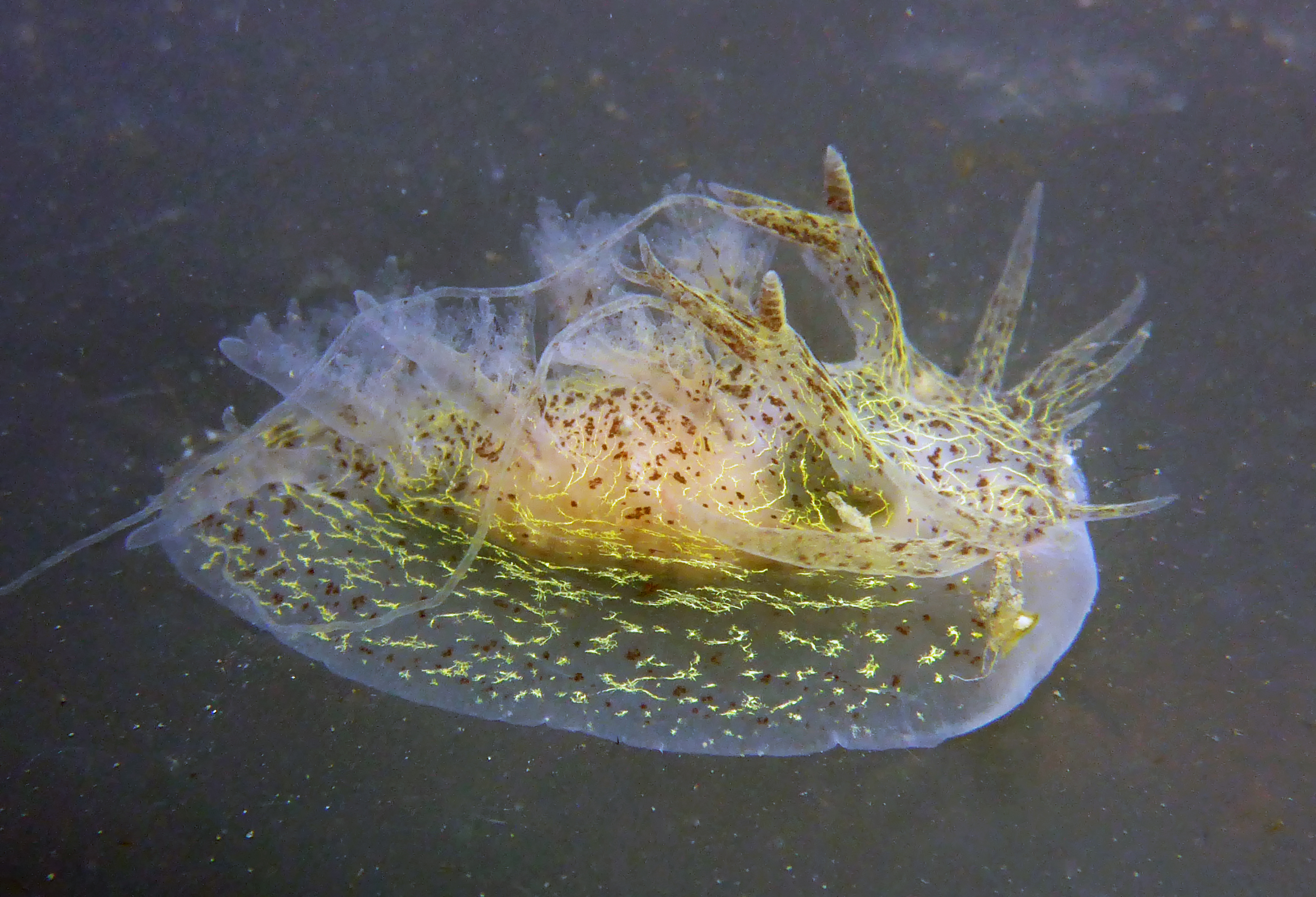
- From left to right in each row, from top to bottom: Dendronotus albus, Dendronotus robustus, Cabangus regius, and Pseudobornella orientalis

Scientific classification
- Kingdom: Animalia
- Phylum: Mollusca
- Class: Gastropoda
- Order: Nudibranchia
- Suborder: Dendronotacea
- Superfamily: Dendronotoidea
- Family: Dendronotidae; Allman, 1845

Type genus
- Dendronotus Alder & Hancock, 1845

Synonyms
- Dendronotinae Allman, 1845

= Dendronotidae =

Family of gastropods

Dendronotidae is a family of nudibranchs, shell-less marine gastropod molluscs or sea slugs, in the superfamily Dendronotoidea.

== Description ==
Animals within this family have elongated bodies with numerous branching cerata on their dorsal sides. The cerata contain extensions from the digestive gland which vary in extent between species. The head has an oral veil having branching extensions. The lamellate rhinophores are surrounded by a sheath and branched extensions.

== Genera ==
The following genera are recognised in the family Dendronotidae:

- Genus Cabangus Korshunova, Bakken, Grøtan, K. B. Johnson, Lundin & Martynov, 2020
- Genus Dendronotus Alder & Hancock, 1845
- Genus Pseudobornella Baba, 1932

== See also ==
- Ramírez, R.; Paredes, C.; Arenas, J. (2003). Moluscos del Perú. Revista de Biologia Tropical. 51(supplement 3): 225-284.
- Goodheart, Jessica A.; Bazinet, Adam L.; Valdés, Ángel; Collins, Allen G.; Cummings, Michael P. (2017). "Prey preference follows phylogeny: evolutionary dietary patterns within the marine gastropod group Cladobranchia (Gastropoda: Heterobranchia: Nudibranchia)". BMC Evolutionary Biology. 17 (1) 221. Bibcode:2017BMCEE..17..221G. doi:10.1186/s12862-017-1066-0. PMC 5659023. PMID 29073890.
