= Ligurian Sea Cetacean Sanctuary =

Marine Protected Area in Europe

- Interactive map of Ligurian Sea Cetacean Sanctuary

Pelagos (Italian: Santuario Pelagos; French: Sanctuaire Pelagos), full name - the Mediterranean Marine Mammal Sanctuary, is an international marine protected area in the northwestern Mediterranean Sea , created by an agreement between Italy , France and Monaco , signed in Rome on 25 November 1999 and entered into force on 21 February 2002. The area of the reserve is 87,500 km^{2}, the length of the coastline is 2,022 km. Its core is the Ligurian Sea ; in addition, the boundaries of the reserve include the waters of the Côte d'Azur , Monaco, Corsica , northern Sardinia and Tuscany. Pelagos became the world's first marine protected area to include waters beyond national jurisdiction.

== Geography ==
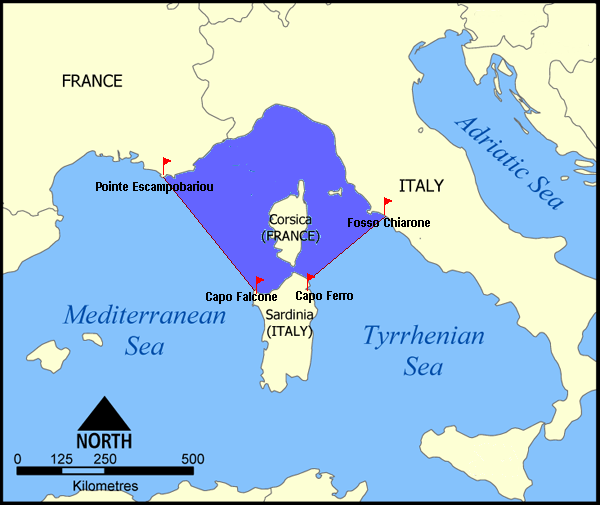
Pelagos Marine Protected Area Map

According to Article 3 of the agreement, the reserve includes the internal waters and territorial waters of the three states, as well as adjacent areas of the high seas. Its western boundary runs along a line from Cape Escampobario (the western end of the Gien Peninsula) to Cape Falcone on the west coast of Sardinia, and its eastern boundary runs along a line from Cape Ferro on the north-eastern coast of Sardinia to the mouth of the Fosso-Chiarone on the west coast of Italy. The mouth of the Chiarone, which forms the border between Tuscany and Lazio , is the southern point of the reserve on the Tyrrhenian coast. It comprises the waters between Toulon (French Riviera), Capo Falcone (western Sardinia), Capo Ferro (eastern Sardinia) and Fosso Chiarone (Tuscany).

According to researchers' calculations, the reserve accounts for almost half of the total area of marine protected areas in the Mediterranean Sea; according to the WWF, without taking Pelagos into account, the share of protected waters in the Mediterranean Sea would decrease from 4.5 to 1.08%.

Part of it is located within Cinque Terre National Park which is a protected area inducted as an Italian national park in 1999. The coast along the Cinque Terre is characterized by high cliffs, caves, bays, tiny beaches and cleft rocks. Marine life in the stretch of the coast which extends from Punta Mesco at Monterosso to Capo Montenegro at Riomaggiore is rich and varied. The steep faces of the cliffs under water and the shallows and isolated rocks are populated by various kinds of gorgonia (sea fans), such as the colorful Leptogorgia sarmentosa and the white Eunicella verrucosa, a rare species in the Mediterranean, but fairly common along this part of the coast. The Posidonia oceanica, a plant that creates very important grass-like colonies, grows here and provides a safe habitat for the reproduction of many organisms. The steep rock faces of Punta Mesco and Capo Montenegro have the richest forms of marine life including rare species: the Eunicella verrucosa, the rare Gerardia savaglia, or black coral. At a depth of only about 15–20 metres (50–70 ft) at Punta Mesco, unlike the rest of the Mediterranean, it is possible to discover the fans of the Paramuricea clavata or red gorgonia.

=== Oceanographic conditions ===
The high concentration of cetaceans in the reserve is explained by a combination of oceanographic, climatic and geomorphological factors that cause the upwelling of cold, nutrient-rich deep waters . This ensures high primary productivity and an abundance of zooplankton, including the northern krill Meganyctiphanes norvegica. The waters of the Ligurian Sea are occupied by a quasi-permanent cyclonic gyre generated by the Ligurian-Provençal Current, one of the most productive upwelling zones in the Mediterranean. The richest western part of the reserve is distinguished by a very narrow continental shelf; off the Ligurian coast, the seabed is cut by submarine canyons, in which upwelling currents arise.

== Fauna ==
All eight species of cetaceans that permanently inhabit the Mediterranean Sea are regularly encountered in the reserve, with their concentrations being particularly high in summer:

- fin whale ( Balaenoptera physalus );
- sperm whale ( Physeter macrocephalus );
- beaked whale ( Ziphius cavirostris );
- pilot whale ( Globicephala melas );
- risso's dolphin ( Grampus griseus );
- Striped dolphin ( Stenella coeruleoalba );
- bottlenose dolphin ( Tursiops truncatus );
- Common dolphin ( Delphinus delphis )

Occasionally, killer whales , rough-toothed dolphins and minke whales are also observed. The monk seal is also among the protected species of the reserve.

The fin whale is the second largest animal on Earth, reaching approximately 20 m in length and weighing up to 70 t. In the Mediterranean Sea, it feeds almost exclusively on euphausiids, primarily northern krill. Since 2021, the Mediterranean population of the fin whale has been classified as "endangered" by the IUCN; the Mediterranean population of the sperm whale has the same status. The highest densities of both species in the Mediterranean Sea are observed in Pelagos.

== History ==
In 1987–1989, research expeditions by the Italian scientific institute Tethys first demonstrated a high density of cetaceans in the Ligurian Sea. In 1990–1991, the institute, together with the Rotary Foundation for the Environment in Europe, launched the Pelagos Project, which envisaged the creation of a biosphere reserve in the pelagic waters of the Corso-Liguro-Provençal basin. The project was initiated by the founder of the institute, Giuseppe Notarbartolo di Sciara. One of the reasons for its launch was the death of a large number of cetaceans in drift nets, which were widely used in these waters at that time.

After almost a decade of negotiations, the ministers of the three countries signed the agreement establishing the reserve in Rome on 25 November 1999. Following ratification by Monaco (2000), France (2001) and Italy, the agreement entered into force on 21 February 2002;in Italy it was implemented by Law No. 391 of 11 October 2001. In November 2001, the parties to the Barcelona Convention decided to include the reserve in the list of Specially Protected Areas of Mediterranean Importance.

== Legal regime and governance ==
The purpose of the agreement is to protect marine mammals of all species and their habitats from the negative impact of human activity. In its own waters, each state ensures the implementation of the agreement independently; on the high seas, each party is responsible for vessels flying its flag, and with respect to vessels of third countries, it acts within the limits of international law.

The highest body of the Agreement is the Meeting of the Parties, under which the Scientific and Technical Committee operates. A permanent secretariat, consisting of no more than two persons headed by an executive secretary, was established in 2006. From 2008 it was located in the Palazzo Ducale in Genoa, and was later transferred to Monaco. The activities of the Parties are defined by a management and action plan for 2022–2027; in 2021, the Pelagos voluntary fund was established.

Since 2009, coastal municipalities have been able to join the Pelagos Partnership Charter, committing to informing the public, disseminating a code of conduct for whale watching, and reporting strandings. All 16 coastal municipalities in the Genoa metropolitan area, from Cogoleto to Moneglia, have joined the charter. In conjunction with the ACCOBAMS agreement , Pelagos awards the High Quality Whale-Watching quality label to whale-watching operators; it was first awarded to French operators in July 2014.

== Protected areas within the boundaries of the reserve ==
The Pelagos Islands regime extends to its entire water area, including the high seas, and is aimed primarily at protecting marine mammals. National parks and marine protected areas located within its boundaries retain their own, generally more stringent, protection regime in effect within their territory.

=== France ===
- Port-Cros National Park is located at the western boundary of the reserve, which begins at the Gien Peninsula; the marine part of the park's heart, near the island of Port-Cros, is included in the Pelagos perimeter. The Ministry responsible for the Environment has entrusted the park with the coordination of the French part of the agreement; the park has carried out these functions since the creation of the reserve.. It is responsible, in particular, for the Pelagos national committee, the partnership charter with French communes and the High Quality Whale-Watching quality label.
- Cap Corse-Agriata Marine Nature Park in Corsica is located entirely within the boundaries of the reserve; the study and protection of marine mammals are included in its management objectives. In 2018, ten communes of the park joined the Pelagos Partnership Charter.

=== Italy ===
- Tuscan Archipelago National Park , established in 1996 and comprising seven islands – Elba, Giglio, Capraia, Montecristo, Pianosa, Giannutri and Gorgona – is located entirely within the boundaries of Pelagos. The marine part of the park is approximately 616 km^{2}; since 2003, the archipelago has been a UNESCO Biosphere Reserve.
- In northern Sardinia, the Asinara and Maddalena Archipelago National Parks are located within the boundaries of the reserve . Together with the Port-Cros and Tuscan Archipelago parks, they participate in joint Franco-Italian projects for the protection of seabirds and waters, implemented in cooperation with the Pelagos Agreement.
- In Liguria, within the boundaries of the reserve there is, in particular, the marine protected area of Portofino, on whose territory the Camogli tonnarella operates.

== Threats ==
The main threats to the marine mammals in the reserve include collisions with vessels, bycatch in fishing gear, underwater noise and disturbance. Collisions with large vessels – cargo ships, ferries and cruise ships – are one of the main causes of human-caused deaths of fin whales and sperm whales. According to a study conducted by the Tethys Institute for the secretariat of the agreement, 426 large cetaceans with signs of collisions have been recorded in the reserve, of which 285 were found dead on the shore and 141 survived. In summer, the density of maritime traffic in the reserve doubles, with the peak coming from high-speed ferries to Corsica and Sardinia, which coincides with the season of the highest concentration of fin whales in feeding grounds. To reduce the risk of collisions in the reserve, the REPCET system is used, which sends warnings to ships about sightings of whales. In addition, research funded by the agreement is studying chemical and biological pollution in the waters of the reserve. Of particular concern are the effects of climate change on the fin whale, which feeds on northern krill, which is found in the Mediterranean Sea at the edge of its range.

Conservation groups have criticised the lack of effectiveness of the measures taken under the agreement: in 2015, WWF published an assessment of the reserve with proposals to regulate shipping and strengthen scientific research, while Greenpeace called Pelagos a "paper park".

== Research and education ==
Since 1987, the Tethys Institute has involved volunteers in its expeditions, and this program is considered one of the oldest citizen science programs in the world. Since 2000, the Institute has been running the long-term Cetacean Sanctuary Research project, studying the socioecology of cetaceans in the western part of the reserve. At the initiative of the Sanremo committee , Pelagos was nominated in the public competition of the Italian Foundation for Nature Conservation "Places of the Heart"; within the framework of the project supported by the foundation "Cetacei, FAI attenzione!", a code of conduct for encounters with cetaceans is disseminated among yachtsmen, fishermen and tourists, and they themselves are involved in collecting data. It was in the waters of the reserve that organized cetacean watching tourism emerged in Italy.

== Photo gallery ==
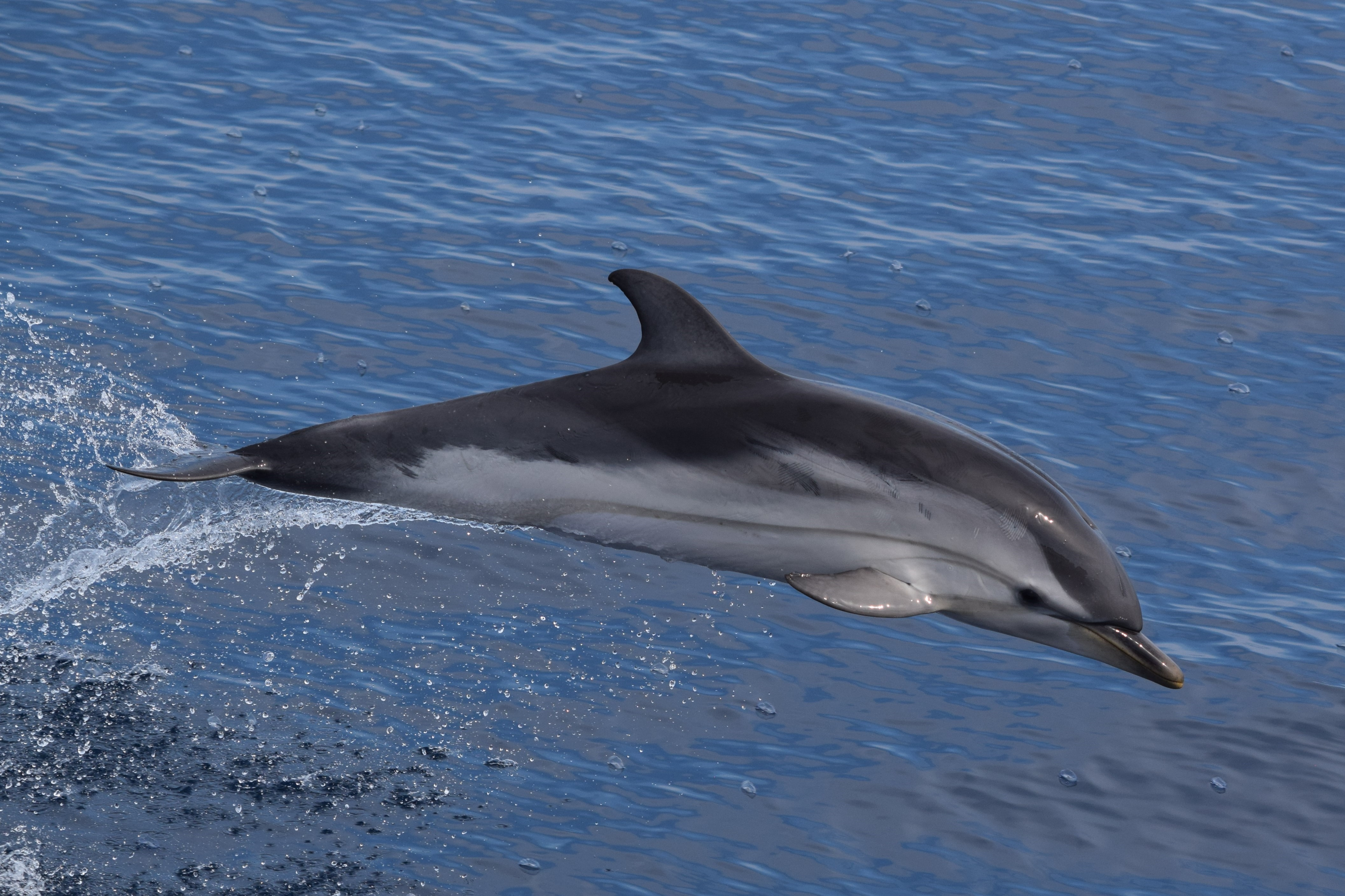
Stenella coeruleoalba Striped dolphin

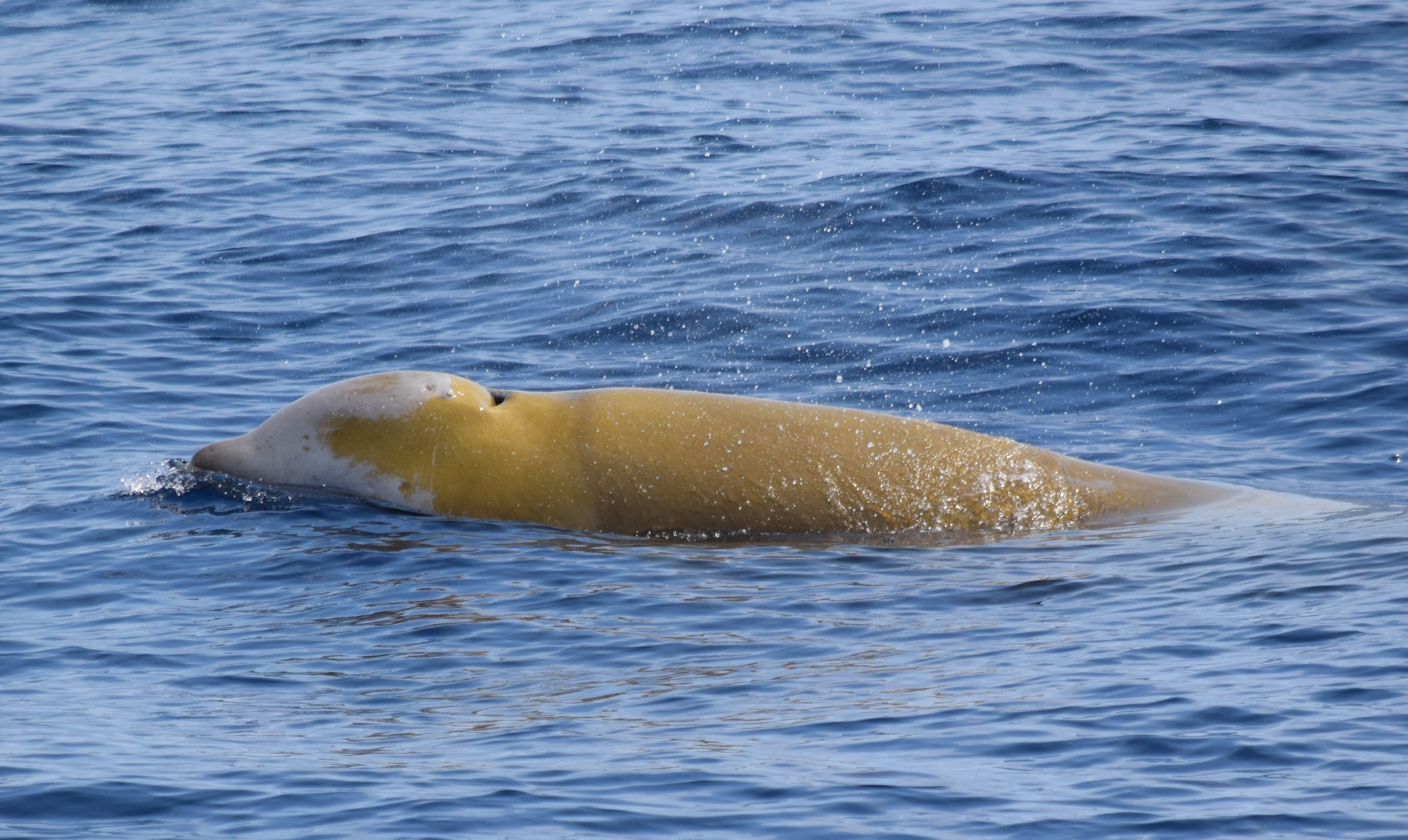
Ziphius cavirostris Cuvier's beaked whale

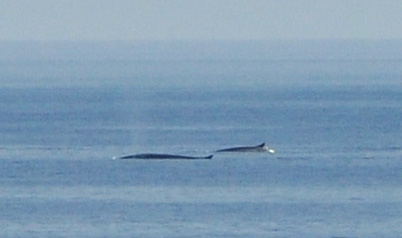
Balaenoptera physalus Fin whale

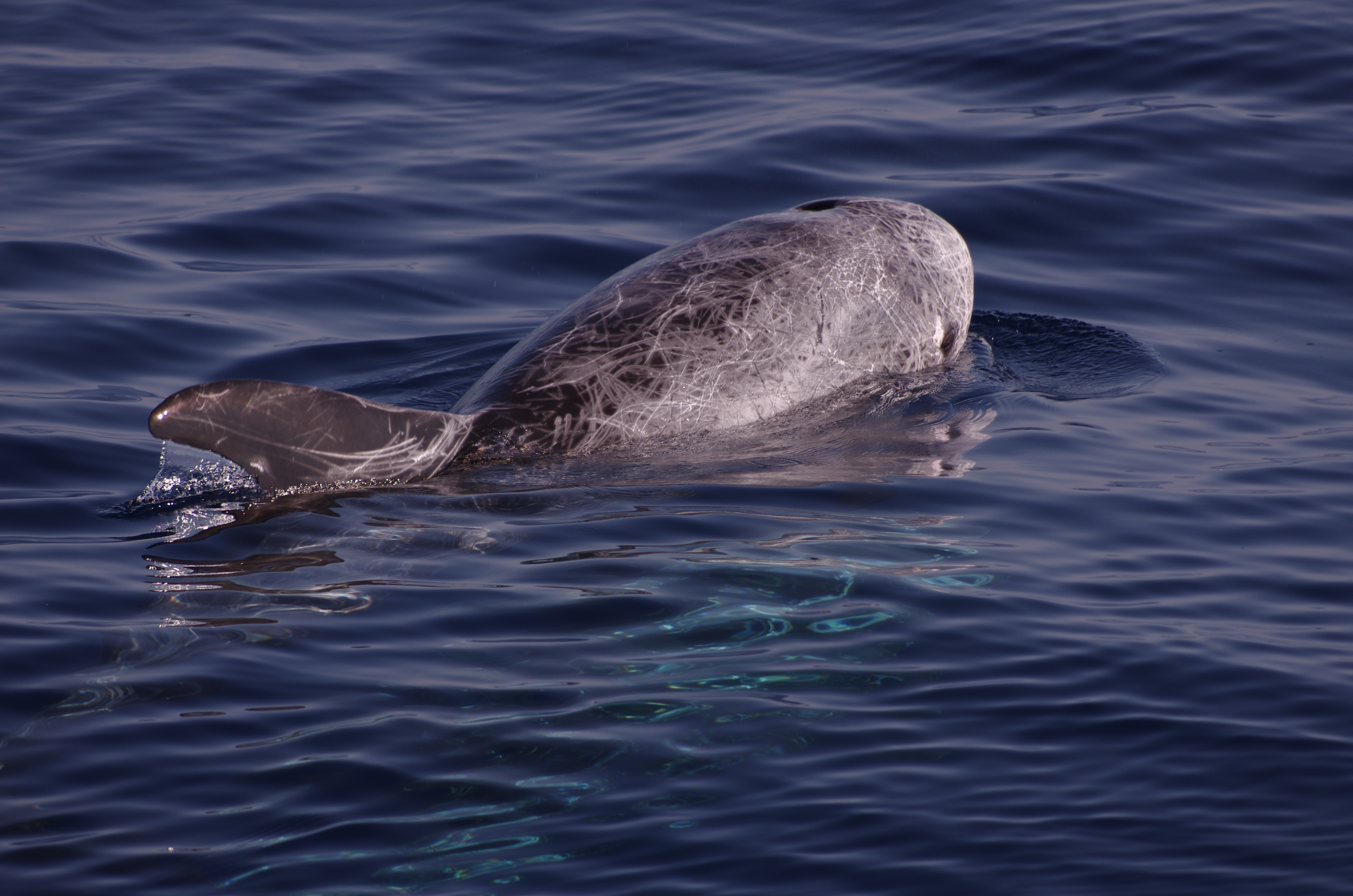
Grampus griseus Risso's dolphin
