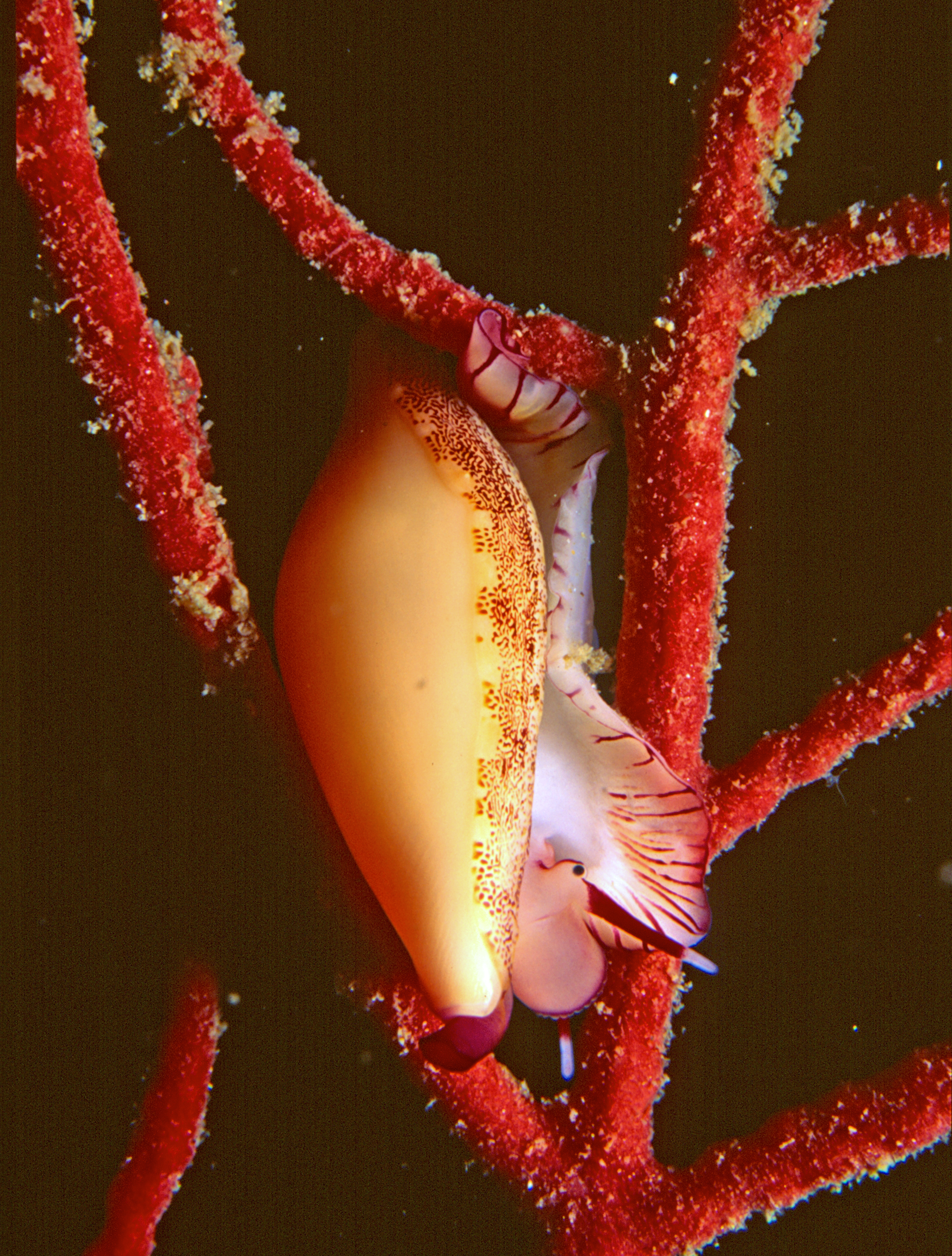
- a live Simnia spelta on soft coral Leptogorgia sarmentosa

Scientific classification
- Kingdom: Animalia
- Phylum: Mollusca
- Class: Gastropoda
- Subclass: Caenogastropoda
- Order: Littorinimorpha
- Family: Ovulidae
- Genus: Simnia
- Species: S. spelta

Binomial name
- Simnia spelta (Linnaeus, 1758)

Synonyms
- Amphiperas (Simnia) secale (G.B. Sowerby I, 1828); Bulla spelta Linnaeus, 1758; Neosimnia spelta (Linnaeus, 1758); Neosimnia spelta spelta (Linnaeus, 1758); Ovula acicularis Tryon, 1885; Ovula intermedia Tryon, 1885 not Lamarck, 1810; † Ovula leathesi sensu Tryon, 1885 not J. de C. Sowerby, 1824; Ovula lutea Pallary, 1900; Ovula obsoleta Locard, 1892; Ovula rosea Pallary, 1900; Ovula roseocarnea Bucquoy, Dautzenberg & Dollfus, 1883; Ovula sowerbyana sensu Tryon, 1885 not Weinkauff, 1881; Ovula spelta (Linnaeus, 1758); Ovula spelta var. lutea Pallary, 1900; Ovula spelta var. lutea-rosea Pallary, 1900; Ovula spelta var. lutea-roseocarnea Bucquoy, Dautzenberg & Dollfus, 1883; Ovula triticea Lamarck, 1810 sensu Payraudeau, 1826 (misapplication); Ovulum obtusum G. B. Sowerby I, 1828 (junior synonym); Ovulum secale G. B. Sowerby I, 1828 (junior synonym); Phenacovolva (Pellasimnia) obtusa obtusa (G.B. Sowerby I, 1828); Simnia nicaeensis Risso, 1826; Simnia nicaoensis sensu J. Allan, 1956 not Risso, 1826 (misspelling [by Allan, J. 1956]...); Simnia spelta var. brevis Coen, 1949

= Simnia spelta =

Species of gastropod

Simnia spelta is a species of sea snail, a marine gastropod mollusc in the family Ovulidae, the ovulids, which are cowrie allies sometimes called "false cowries". It was first described in 1758 by the Swedish naturalist Carl Linnaeus.

== Description ==
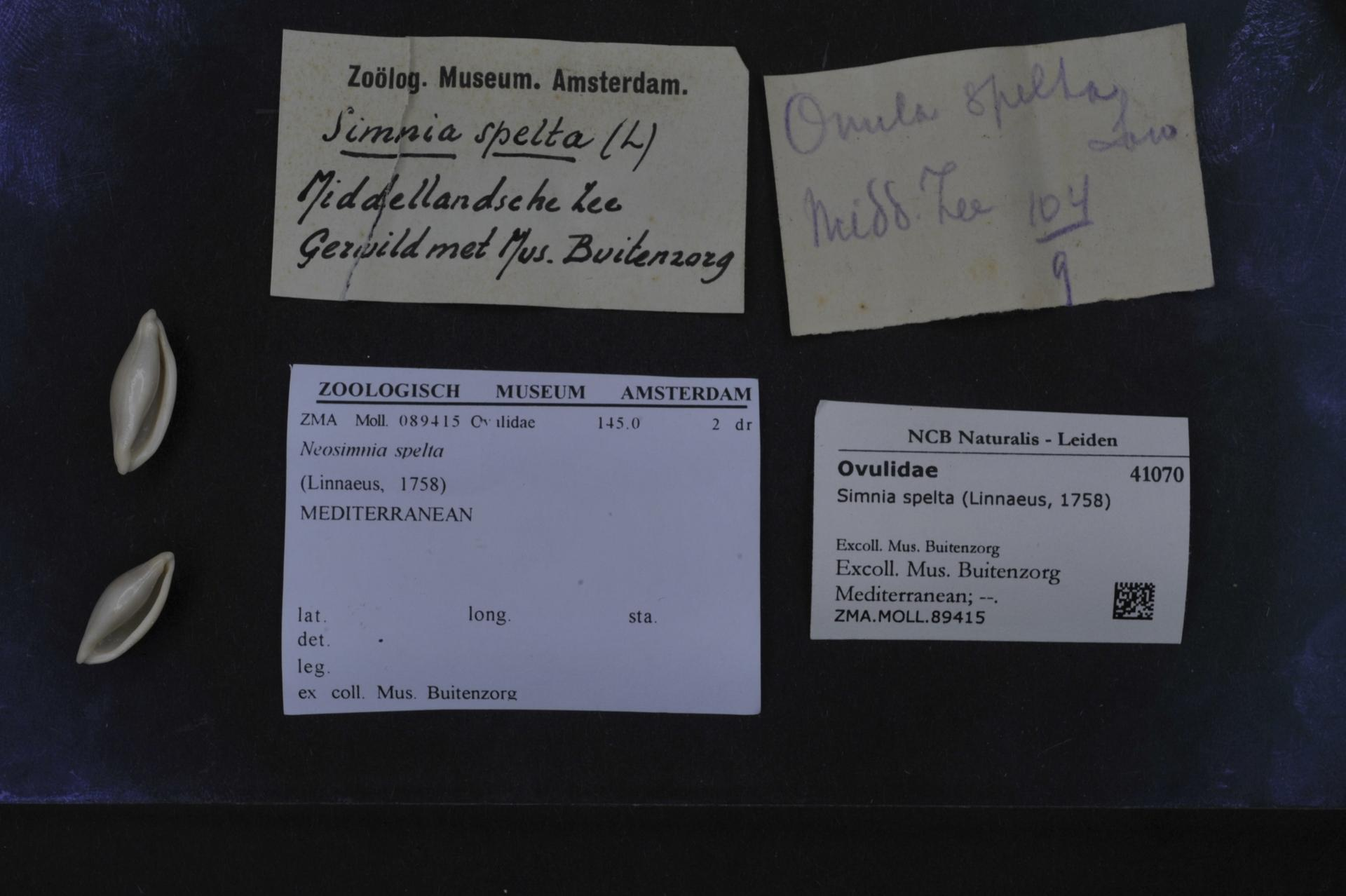
Simnia spelta shells.

Simnia spelta grows to a length of about 20 mm (0.8 in). The shell is roughly egg or cigar-shaped with a flattened base. It is strong, thick, smooth and glossy, with inrolled edges at the sides of the long aperture on the underside. The colouring varies according to the species of gorgonian on which it is living. The background colour of the shell is white, yellow, pink or orange, often with white spots or dark spots, marbling or streaks, providing camouflage. As is commonly the case in Simnia species, the colour of all the visible soft parts normally matches the colour of the gorgonian on which the snail is grazing, as the pigment from the gorgonian is retained in the mantle of the mollusk.

== Distribution ==
Simnia spelta was at one time considered to be endemic to the western Mediterranean Sea and the Adriatic Sea, but it is now known to occur also in the eastern Atlantic Ocean between the Bay of Biscay, the Canary Islands and Angola. Its normal habitat is living on gorgonians, or sea fans, at depths down to about 10 metres (33 ft).

== Ecology ==
Simnia spelta is a specialist predator on gorgonians of the genera Eunicella, Paramuricea and Lophogorgia. It feeds on the polyps and the coenenchyme, the living connective tissue that surrounds the horny skeleton, but does not graze excessively and therefore does not kill its host. The sexes are separate in this species, and fertilisation is internal. Eggs are laid on the branches of the host species and resemble the natural warty appearance of the stems.

The white gorgonian Eunicella singularis is one of the sea fans with which this snail associates. On this host the snail is normally white and mimics the twigs in appearance. It feeds and lays its eggs on the gorgonian branches. Afterwards, epibionts grow on the denuded branches.
