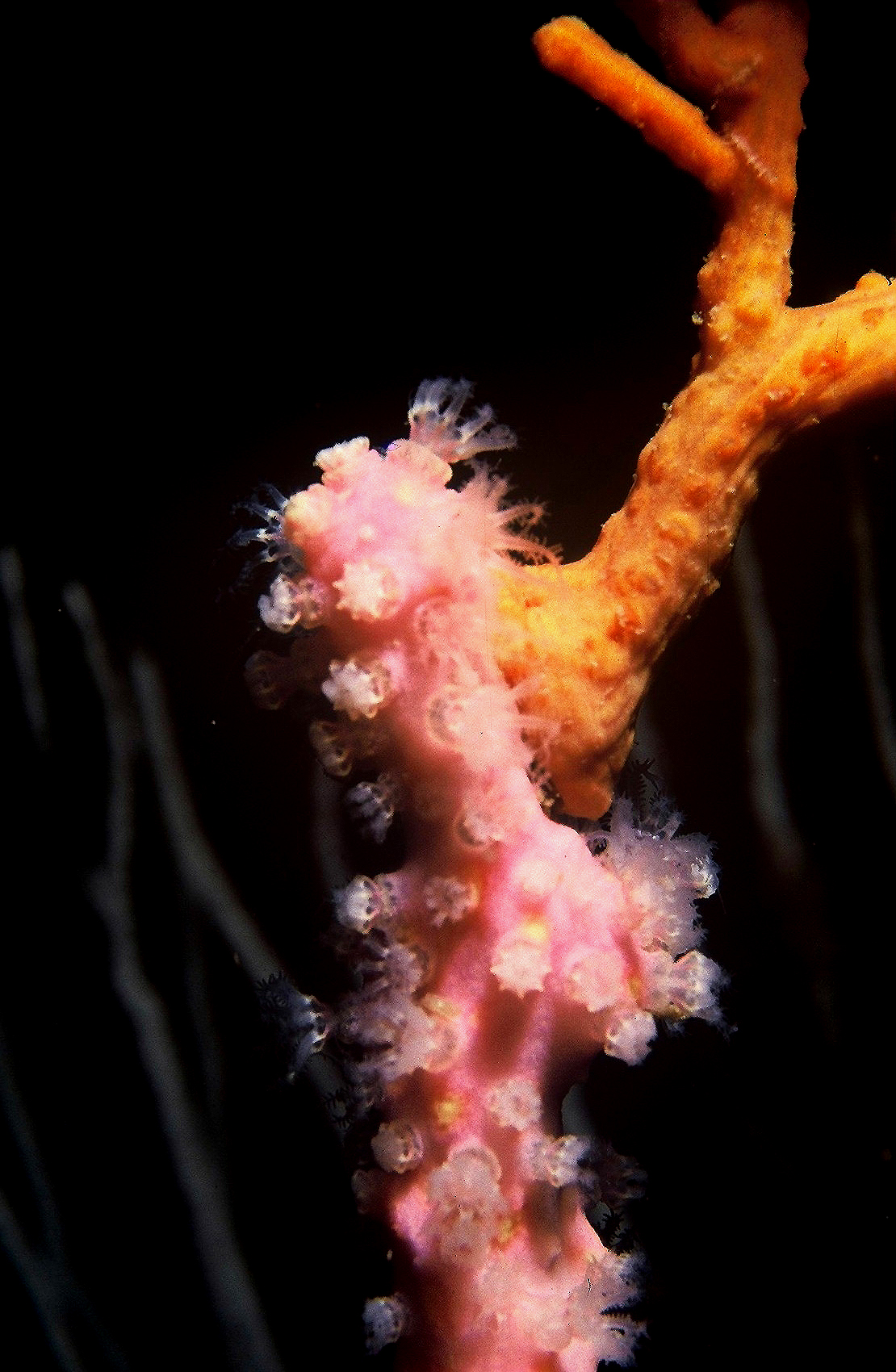
- Alcyonium coralloides overgrowing Leptogorgia sarmentosa

Conservation status
- Least Concern (IUCN 3.1) (Mediterranean)

Scientific classification
- Kingdom: Animalia
- Phylum: Cnidaria
- Subphylum: Anthozoa
- Class: Octocorallia
- Order: Malacalcyonacea
- Family: Alcyoniidae
- Genus: Alcyonium
- Species: A. coralloides

Binomial name
- Alcyonium coralloides (Pallas, 1766)

Synonyms
- Parerythropodium coralloides (Pallas, 1766)

= Alcyonium coralloides =

Species of coral

Alcyonium coralloides, commonly known as false coral, is a colonial species of soft coral in the family Alcyoniidae. It is native to the northeastern Atlantic Ocean and the Mediterranean Sea. In the former location it generally grows as sheets or small lobes but in the latter it is parasitic and overgrows sea fans.

== Taxonomy ==
This soft coral was first described in 1766 by the Russian naturalist Peter Simon Pallas who named it Parerythropodium coralloides. It was later determined on the basis of its growth forms, the nature of its spicules (small skeletal elements) and the passages in its coenenchyme (the tissue uniting the polyps) that it should be included in the genus Alcyonium and it was renamed Alcyonium coralloides.

== Distribution and habitat ==
Alcyonium coralloides is plentiful in the Mediterranean Sea but less common on the Atlantic coast of Western Europe and in the English Channel. The northern limit of its range is Scotland. In the Atlantic Ocean, colonies are small and grow directly on vertical rock faces, under overhangs and in caves. In the Mediterranean, colonies usually grow on sea fans such as Eunicella, Paramuricea and Leptogorgia, as well as on the tunicate Microcosmus and on coralline algae. Some species commonly colonised include Eunicella singularis, Eunicella cavolinii, Eunicella verrucosa, Paramuricea clavata and Leptogorgia sarmentosa.

== Description ==
Alcyonium coralloides has several different habits of growth. In the Atlantic Ocean it sometimes grows as encrusting sheets over rock surfaces. These are red with white or yellow polyps, sometimes having bare areas from which polyps are absent. More frequently, it grows in short finger-like lobes up to 4 cm (1.6 in) long, pale pink with white polyps. It seldom encrusts sea fans.

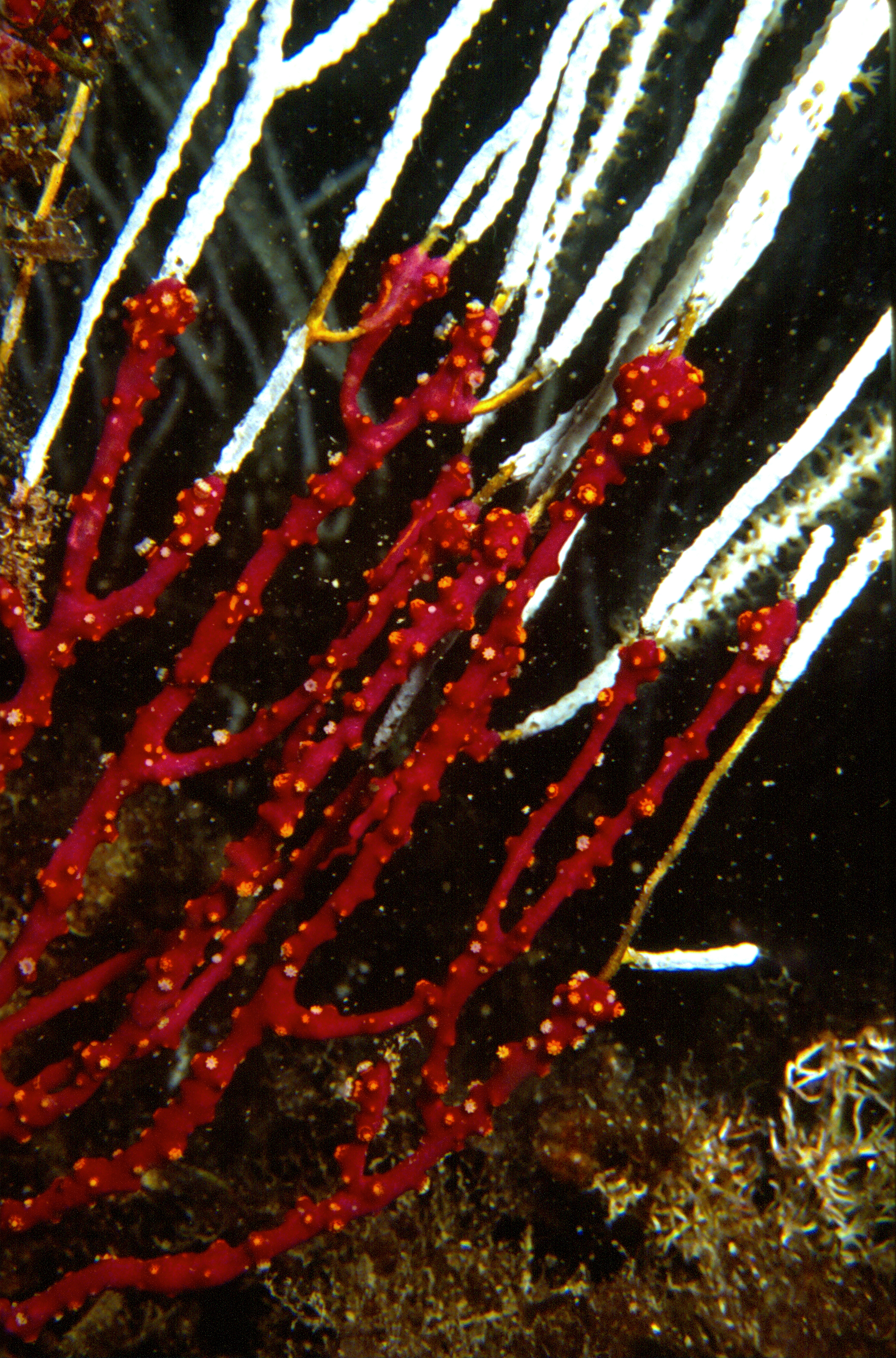
Alcyonium coralloides overgrowing Eunicella singularis

In the Mediterranean, the habit of growth of Alcyonium coralloides is often encrusting, growing over the surface of a gorgonian. The sea fan has a rigid skeleton so Alcyonium coralloides does not need a supportive skeleton but it does however have spicules in its surface layers which makes it rough to the touch. The colour of the colony is often purple, but may be white, pink or yellow. The white and pink forms mainly occur in deep water and are considered mutants. The polyps, which are usually white, cream or yellow, may be 5 mm (0.2 in) long and are usually larger than those of the sea fan it is encrusting. It can be considered parasitic as the tissues of the sea fan are killed and Alcyonium coralloides adheres to the underlying skeleton. The mechanism by which it kills its host's tissues is not understood. Occasionally in the Mediterranean, this soft coral exhibits a lobed form similar to Atlantic colonies.

== Biology ==
Like other soft corals, Alcyonium coralloides is a suspension feeder. The polyps spread their pinnate tentacles wide and passively gather zooplankton and organic particles from the water flowing past. By colonising gorgonians, Alcyonium coralloides is raised above the surface of the substrate. This is advantageous to it as the water flow, and thus the supply of plankton, is enhanced.

Colonies are either male or female and sexual reproduction occurs in Mediterranean populations. With a period of five or six months, the length of gametogenesis is shorter than for any other littoral octocorals. Larvae have been observed in the gastric cavity of females in May and in the open water in June, being ready to settle in early summer, a time at which the host corals are most vulnerable because of their own breeding activities. In the Atlantic, reproduction is mainly by parthenogenesis, with embryos being brooded inside the gastric cavity of their parent, to be liberated as juveniles with limited dispersal ability. This may explain the lack of variability and the rather patchy distribution of this soft coral in the Atlantic as compared to its abundance in the western Mediterranean.
