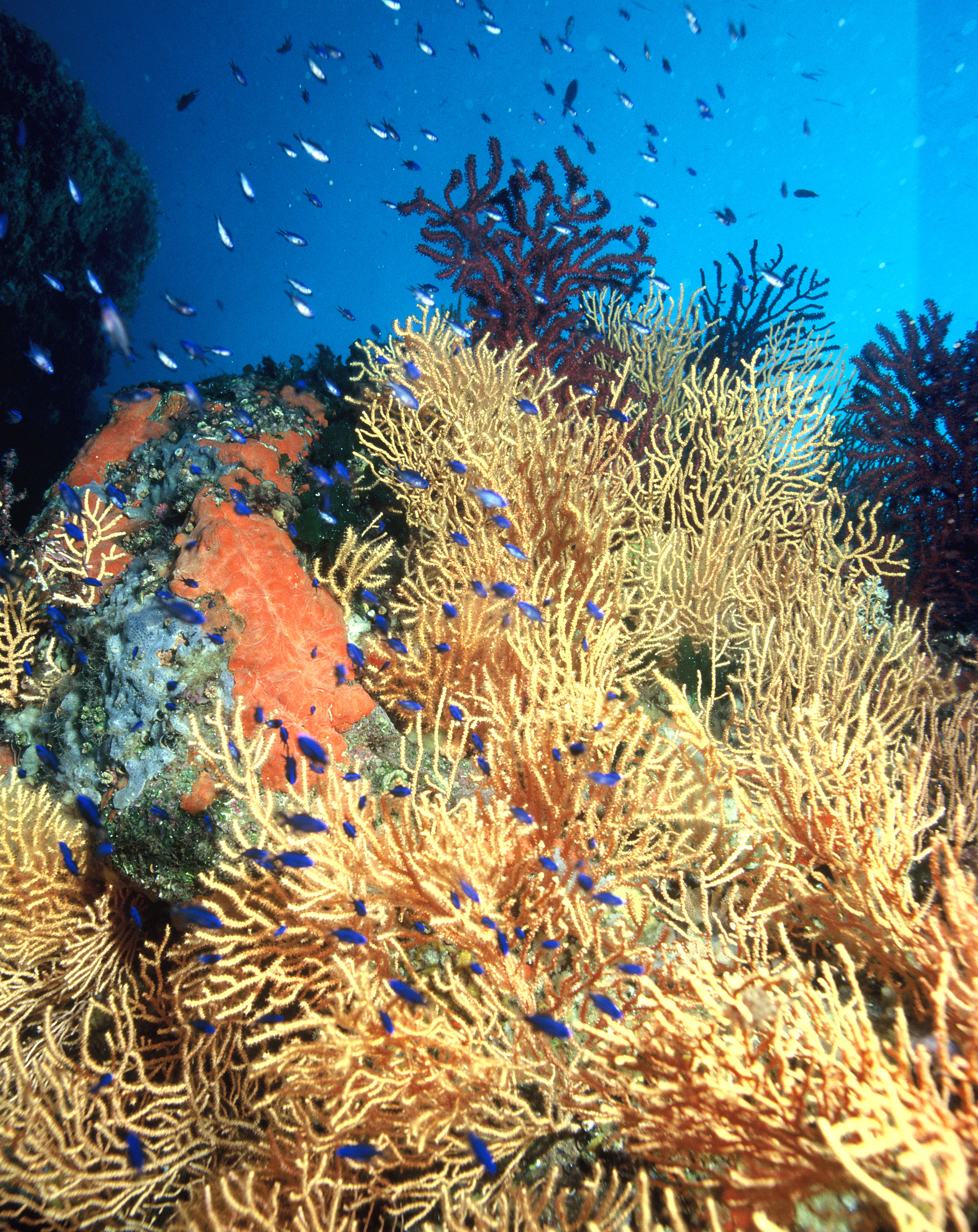

Conservation status
- Near Threatened (IUCN 3.1) (Mediterranean)

Scientific classification
- Kingdom: Animalia
- Phylum: Cnidaria
- Subphylum: Anthozoa
- Class: Octocorallia
- Order: Malacalcyonacea
- Family: Eunicellidae
- Genus: Eunicella
- Species: E. cavolini

Binomial name
- Eunicella cavolini (Koch, 1887)

= Eunicella cavolini =

Species of coral

Eunicella cavolini, commonly known as the yellow gorgonian or yellow sea whip, is a species of colonial soft coral in the family Gorgoniidae. It is native to parts of the eastern Atlantic Ocean, Mediterranean Sea and Ionian Sea where it is a common species.

== Description ==
Eunicella cavolini is a much-branched soft coral growing to a height of about 50 cm (20 in). It is fan-shaped with the irregular, cylindrical branches largely growing in a single plane. The stem has an enlarged base fixed to the substrate and the branches are smooth, short and about 3 mm (0.12 in) thick. The coenenchyme (the thin fleshy covering of the stiff skeleton) is yellowish-orange. The polyps are white to yellow, about 2 mm (0.08 in) long and arranged in four rows. Eunicella cavolini can be confused with the warty gorgonian (Eunicella verrucosa), but that sea fan has rougher branches, or with Leptogorgia sarmentosa, but that species has straighter, more slender branches with smaller polyps.

== Distribution and habitat ==
Eunicella cavolini is common throughout the Mediterranean Sea. It grows mainly between 10 and 30 m (33 and 98 ft) but can be found as deep as 150 m (492 ft). It is normally found in a shallower zone than the violescent sea-whip (Paramuricea clavata). It is often found growing in association with other soft corals, sponges, polychaete worms, bryozoans, barnacles and winged oysters.

== Biology ==
The polyps expand their tentacles to catch zooplankton. The food fragments are passed to the mouth and then move into the gut to be digested. The nutrients are then transferred to all parts of the colony via channels in the living matrix of the branches. The fan is usually orientated perpendicular to the current so as to maximise the capture of prey.

Colonies are either male or female and breeding takes place during the summer. Polyps in male colonies liberate sperm into the water and the eggs are fertilised inside the gastric chambers of female polyps in other colonies. The embryos develop into planula larvae which are released into the sea. After drifting as part of the plankton for one to four weeks, these settle on suitable surface and undergo metamorphosis into new polyps. These develop into new colonies by budding. The growth rate is slow, at about 1 to 2 cm (0.4 to 0.8 in) per year.
