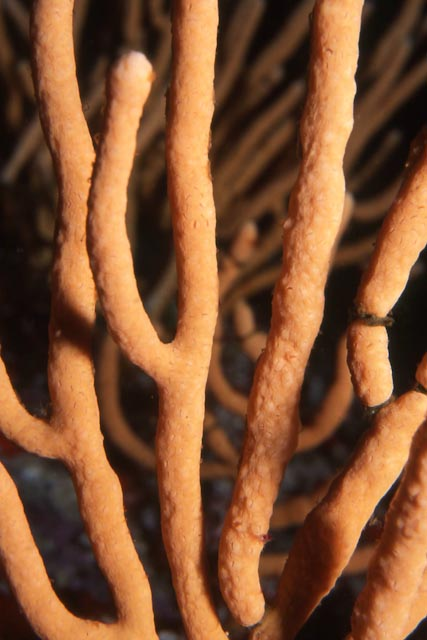

Scientific classification
- Kingdom: Animalia
- Phylum: Cnidaria
- Subphylum: Anthozoa
- Class: Octocorallia
- Order: Malacalcyonacea
- Family: Eunicellidae
- Genus: Eunicella
- Species: E. papillosa

Binomial name
- Eunicella papillosa (Esper, 1797)

= Nippled sea fan =

Species of coral

The nippled sea fan Eunicella microthela (Lamouroux, 1816) previously known by the junior synonym Eunicella papillosa (Esper, 1797), is a species of gorgonian sea fan in the family Gorgoniidae.

== Description ==
This fan is short and pale cream to orange in colour. It grows upright or in bushy masses, with irregular or frequent branches coming off the main basal stem. The branches are covered on all sides with many small bumps from which the polyps extend. It may grow up to 18 cm tall and have branches of 0.2 to 0.4 cm wide.

== Distribution ==
This sea fan is found only around the southern African coast from Lüderitz to Sodwana Bay in 1–360 m of water.

== Ecology ==
This sea fan usually grows in areas sheltered from strong current. It is preyed upon by the whip fan nudibranch, which strongly resembles the feeding fan.
