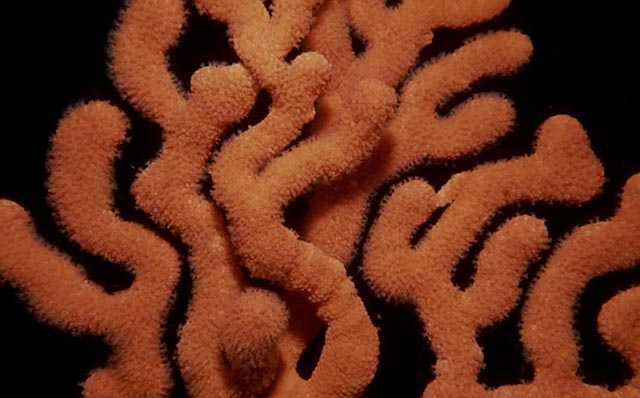

Scientific classification
- Kingdom: Animalia
- Phylum: Cnidaria
- Subphylum: Anthozoa
- Class: Octocorallia
- Order: Malacalcyonacea
- Family: Eunicellidae
- Genus: Eunicella
- Species: E. tricoronata

Binomial name
- Eunicella tricoronata Velimirov, 1971

= Sinuous sea fan =

Species of coral

The sinuous sea fan (Eunicella tricoronata) is a species of gorgonian sea fan in the family Gorgoniidae.

== Description ==
This fan is flattened and has curving branches which all tend to grow in the same plane. It may be mustard yellow to orange and when feeding the extended polyps give the fan a fuzzy appearance. It may grow up to 1m tall and have branches of 0.7 to 1 cm wide.

== Distribution ==
This sea fan is found only around the South African coast from the Cape Peninsula to East London in 9–36 m of water. It is endemic to this region.

== Ecology ==
This fan usually grows in deeper water, sheltered from wave action. It is preyed upon by the whip fan nudibranch, Tritonia nilsodhneri, which strongly resembles the feeding fan.
