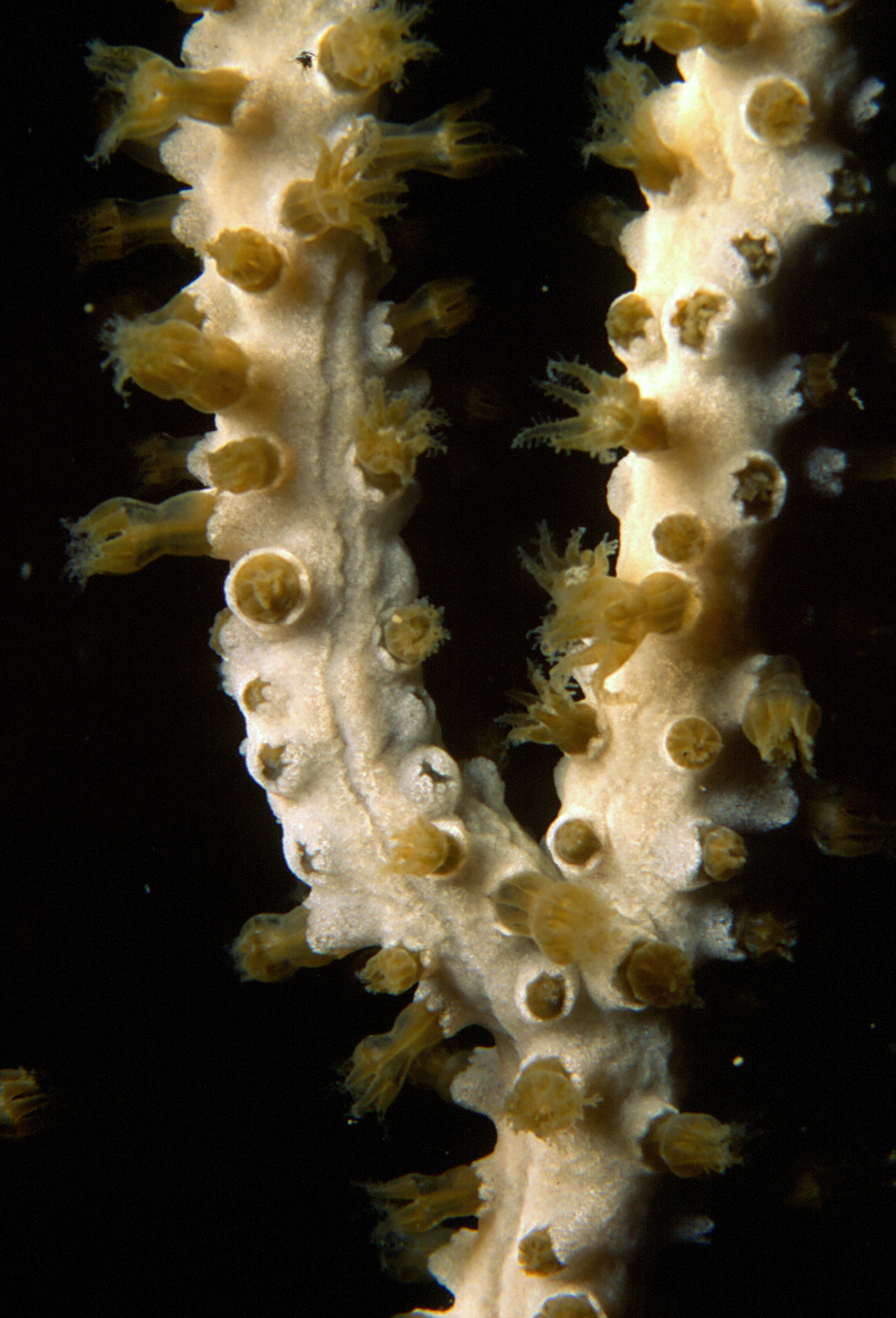

Conservation status
- Near Threatened (IUCN 3.1) (Mediterranean)

Scientific classification
- Kingdom: Animalia
- Phylum: Cnidaria
- Subphylum: Anthozoa
- Class: Octocorallia
- Order: Malacalcyonacea
- Family: Eunicellidae
- Genus: Eunicella
- Species: E. singularis

Binomial name
- Eunicella singularis (Esper, 1791)

= Eunicella singularis =

Species of coral

Eunicella singularis, the white gorgonian, is a species of colonial soft coral, a sea fan in the family Gorgoniidae. It is found in the western Mediterranean Sea, Adriatic Sea and Ionian Sea. It was first described in 1791 by the German naturalist Eugenius Johann Christoph Esper.

== Description ==
Eunicella singularis can grow to a height of about 70 cm (28 in) and a width of 70 cm (28 in). It has a branching structure, growing from a thickened base with a small number of nearly-vertical branches and a few side branches. The surface of the branches is smooth, with the calyces from which the polyps protrude being indistinct. The general colour is white and the polyps are translucent and yellowish-brown or olive.

== Distribution and habitat ==
Eunicella singularis is found in the western Mediterranean Sea and the Adriatic Sea at depths of 10 to 60 metres (33 to 197 ft). It mainly occurs on shallowly sloping rock surfaces which are often partially covered with sediment, but also on pebbles, shells or other objects surrounded by sediment. It favours well-lit locations.

== Biology ==
The polyps of Eunicella singularis feed by spreading their tentacles to intercept zooplankton and organic particles floating past. This diet is supplemented by the energy provided, via photosynthesis, by the symbiotic dinoflagellates that are present in the tissues of the sea fan.

Reproduction involves the release of planula larvae which spend somewhere between a few hours and several days in the open sea. Each larva then settles on the seabed and undergoes metamorphosis into a primary polyp within about four days. This founds a new colony and grows by budding off new polyps. The branches increase in length by up to about 33 mm (1.3 in) a year and colonies may live for twenty to thirty years. Predators may feed on the tissues and epibionts such as bryozoa may take up residence on denuded branches and cause further regression of the living tissues. The colonies may eventually be toppled by currents, perhaps because of the increased resistance to water flow produced by the epibionts.

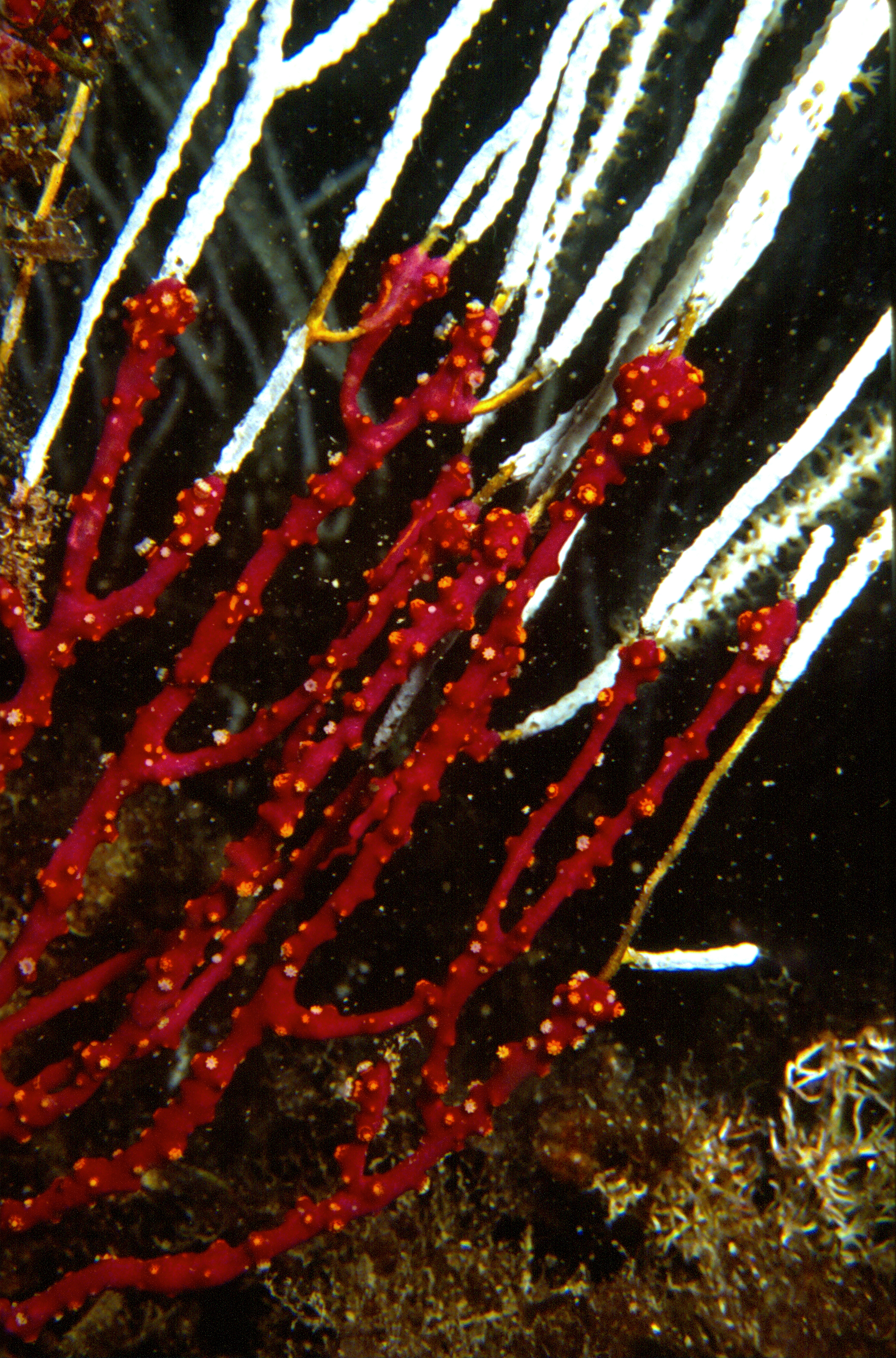
Alcyonium coralloides overgrowing Eunicella singularis

A laboratory study found that at 24 °C (75 °F), thermal stress caused the polyps to remain unexpanded (and thus not feeding), respiration was decreased, and photosynthesis stopped (although the symbionts were still present). The sea fan was able to live on its reserves for several weeks during thermal stress before necrosis set in, but it recovered fully when the water temperature fell sufficiently.

== Ecology ==
In the Mediterranean Sea, Eunicella singularis is often overgrown by the soft coral Alcyonium coralloides which kills the sea fan's soft tissues as it spreads along the branches of its slow-growing host.

The nudibranch Marionia blainvillea feeds on this sea fan and, where their ranges overlap, so does the whip fan nudibranch (Tritonia nilsodhneri). The gastropod mollusc Simnia spelta mimics E. singularis and feeds and lays its eggs on its branches. The bare areas where the mollusc has removed the coenenchyme tissue soon become colonised by epibionts such as algae, tube worms, bryozoans, and colonial tunicates. The tissue may regrow and form cavities in which other organisms can flourish, thus forming a small but biodiverse community.
