= Isola delle Bisce Lighthouse =

Isola delle Bisce
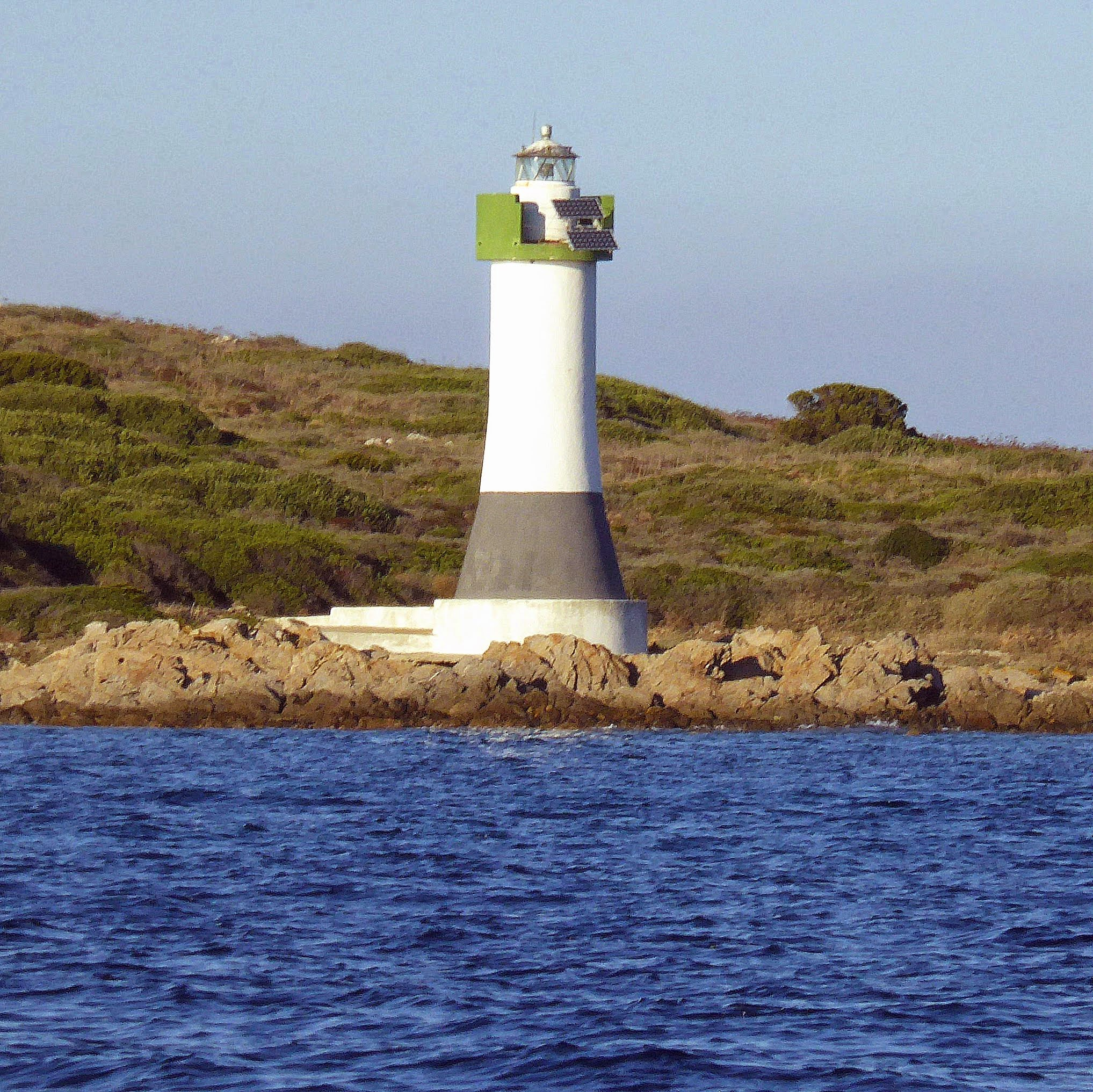
- Isola delle Bisce Lighthouse
- Location: Isola delle Bisce; Arzachena; Sardinia; Italy
- Coordinates: 41°09′43″N 9°31′29″E

Tower
- Constructed: 1935
- Foundation: concrete base
- Construction: masonry tower
- Automated: yes
- Height: 9 metres (30 ft)
- Shape: tapered cylindrical tower balcony and lantern
- Markings: white tower and lantern, green balcony, grey metallic lantern dome
- Power source: solar power
- Operator: Marina Militare
- Fog signal: no

Light
- Focal height: 11 metres (36 ft)
- Intensity: MaxiHalo-60 II
- Range: 8 nautical miles (15 km; 9.2 mi)
- Characteristic: Fl G 3s.
- Italy no.: 1148 E.F.

Isola delle Bisce Lighthouse (Italian: Faro di Isola delle Bisce) is an active lighthouse located on a small islet, 590 metres (1,940 ft) from Capo Ferro Lighthouse, which make part of the Maddalena archipelago in the Strait of Bonifacio. The lighthouse guides the ships through the narrow Canale delle Bisce; the structure is situated in the municipality of Arzachena on the Tyrrhenian Sea.

== Description ==
The lighthouse was built in 1935 and consists of a masonry tapered cylindrical tower, 9 metres (30 ft) high, with balcony and lantern. The tower and the lantern are painted white, the balcony in green and the lantern dome in grey metallic. The light is positioned at 11 metres (36 ft) above sea level and emits one green flash in a 3 seconds period visible up to a distance of 8 nautical miles (15 km; 9.2 mi). The lighthouse is completely automated, powered by a solar unit and managed by the Marina Militare with the identification code number 1148 E.F.

== See also ==
- List of lighthouses in Italy
- Strait of Bonifacio
