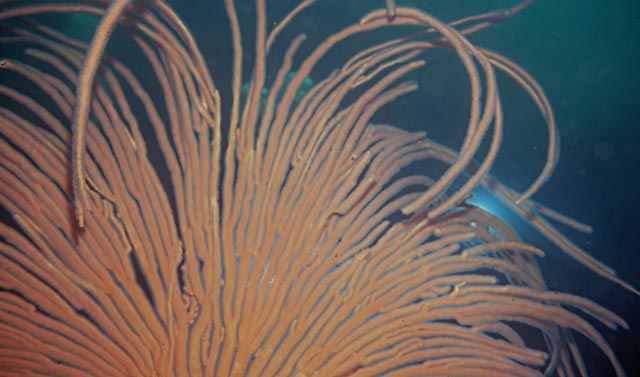

Scientific classification
- Kingdom: Animalia
- Phylum: Cnidaria
- Subphylum: Anthozoa
- Class: Octocorallia
- Order: Malacalcyonacea
- Family: Eunicellidae
- Genus: Eunicella
- Species: E. albicans

Binomial name
- Eunicella albicans (Kolliker, 1865)

= Whip fan =

Species of coral

The whip fan (Eunicella albicans), also called the flagellar sea fan, is a species of gorgonian sea fan in the family Eunicellidae.

== Description ==
This fan is orange and has flexible whip-like branches. It may grow up to 70 cm tall and have branches of 0.3 to 0.5 cm wide.

== Distribution ==
This sea fan is found only around the South African coast from the Atlantic side of the Cape Peninsula to Port Elizabeth in 10–30 m of water. It is endemic to this region.

== Ecology ==
This sea fan is preyed upon by the whip fan nudibranch, Duvaucelia odhneri, previously known as Tritonia nilsodhneri, which closely resembles the feeding fan.
