= Savalia lucifica =

Scientific classification
- Kingdom: Animalia
- Phylum: Cnidaria
- Subphylum: Anthozoa
- Class: Hexacorallia
- Order: Zoantharia
- Family: Parazoanthidae
- Genus: Savalia
- Species: S. lucifica

Binomial name
- Savalia lucifica (Cutress C.E. & Pequegnat W.E., 1960)

Synonyms
- Parazoanthus lucificum Cutress & Pequenat, 1960

Species of coral

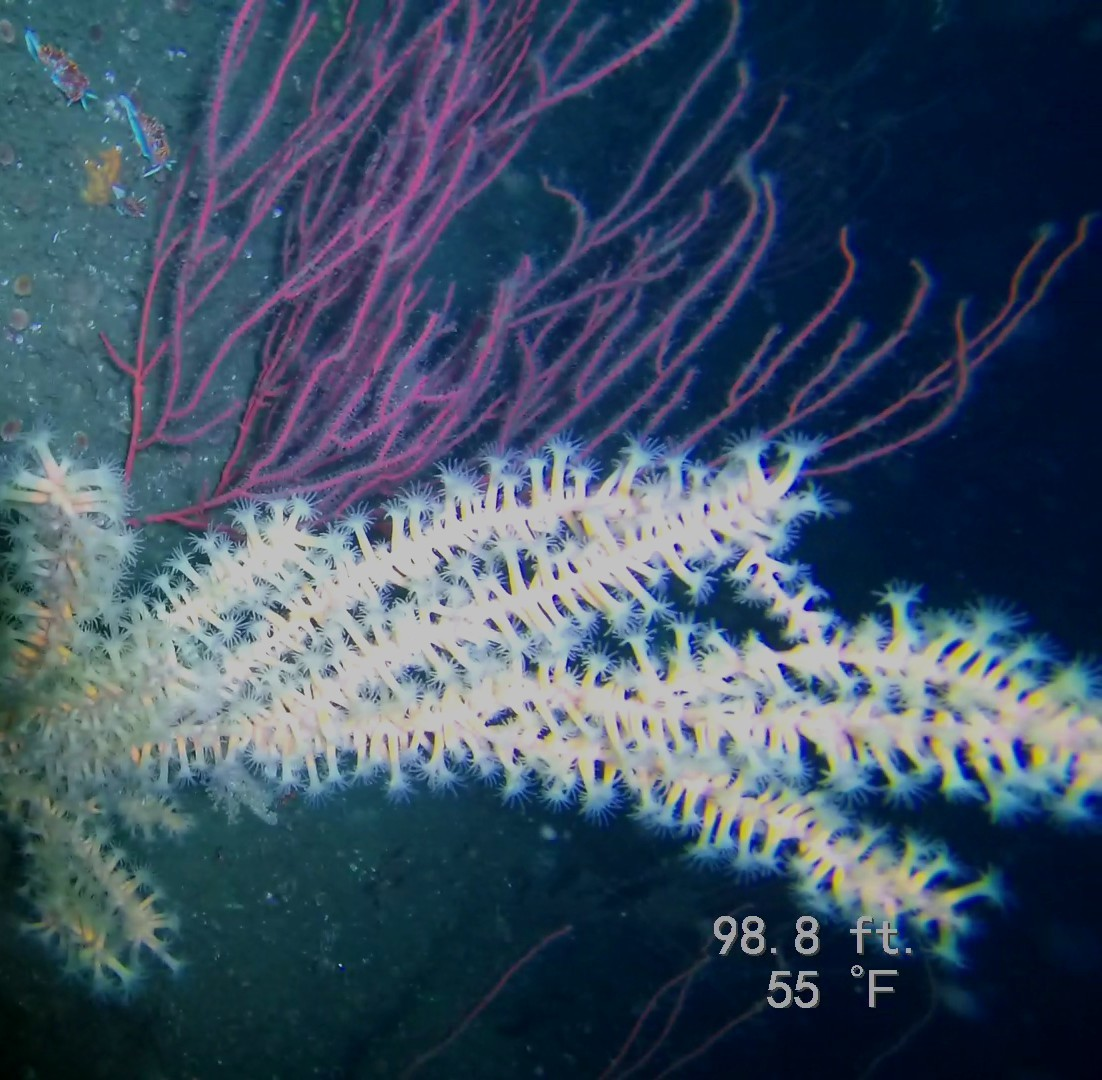
Savalia lucificia

Savalia lucifica, commonly known as the luminescent parazoanthid, is a form of false black coral in the family Parazoanthidae. It is known from the Pacific Ocean where it lives at depths of around 700 m (2,297 ft) off the coast of California, but more recently (2011) has been discovered in the Mediterranean Sea at a depth of 270 m (886 ft). This zoanthid exhibits bioluminescence.

== Distribution ==
Savalia lucifica was first described by Cutress & Pequegnat in 1960. The type specimen was recovered from the seabed at a depth of 700 m (2,297 ft) in the Pacific Ocean off the coast of California. In 2011 the same species was recovered from a depth of 270 m (886 ft) in the Mediterranean Sea by a robot submersible operated from the Italian oceanographic ship "Astrea". This vessel was undertaking exploration and research into the deepwater red coral populations of the Aegean Sea at the time.

== Ecology ==
Savalia lucifica emits light when stimulated, for example when stroked gently by a finger. In the Mediterranean Sea, this zoanthid uses the deepwater gorgonian Callogorgia verticillata as a substrate.
