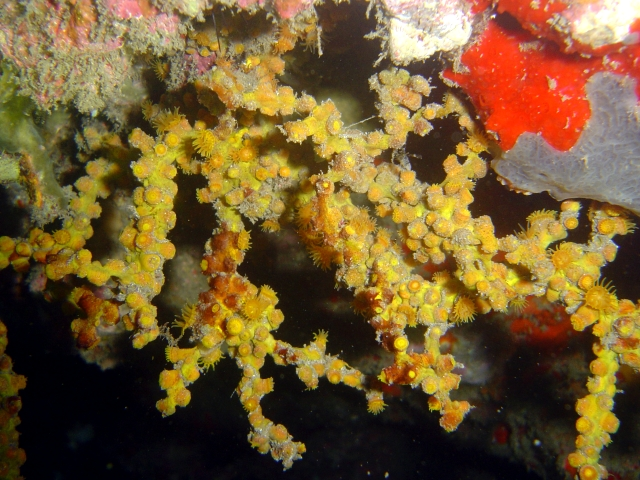

Conservation status
- Near Threatened (IUCN 3.1) (Mediterranean)

Scientific classification
- Kingdom: Animalia
- Phylum: Cnidaria
- Subphylum: Anthozoa
- Class: Hexacorallia
- Order: Zoantharia
- Family: Parazoanthidae
- Genus: Savalia
- Species: S. savaglia

Binomial name
- Savalia savaglia (Bertoloni, 1819)

Synonyms
- Gerardia lamarcki Lacaze-Duthiers 1864; Gerardia savaglia (Bertoloni, 1819); Gerardia savalia (Bertoloni, 1819)

= Savalia savaglia =

Species of coral

Savalia savaglia, commonly known as gold coral, is a species of colonial false black coral in the family Parazoanthidae. It is native to the northeastern Atlantic Ocean and the Mediterranean Sea where it often grows in association with a gorgonian. It is extremely long-lived, with a lifespan of 2,700 years, and develops into a large tree-like colony.

== Description ==
Savalia savaglia forms a large, tree-like colony. The polyps secrete a horny brown or black skeleton from which they project. They are yellow and about 3 cm (1.2 in) tall. Each polyp has an oral disc at the top surrounded by about thirty tentacles. These are arranged in two whorls and are not pinnate, making it easy to recognise that this species is a zoanthid rather than an octocoral or a member of another order of Hexacorallia.

== Distribution ==
Savalia savaglia is found in the western Mediterranean Sea between the Straits of Gibraltar and Sardinia. It is also found in the Atlantic Ocean, its range including the Canary Islands, Madeira, and the Atlantic coasts of Spain and Portugal. The species is uncommon throughout most of its range, though rather more common in the Gulf of Corinth and the Sea of Marmara. Its depth range is usually between 10 and 120 m (33 and 394 ft). Research has shown that its most suitable habitat is a rough sea floor with steeply sloping rocks which are slanting northeastward, at a depth in the range of 34 to 77 m (112 to 253 ft).

== Ecology ==
A colony of Savalia savaglia often starts by colonising the surface of a gorgonian such as Paramuricea clavata or Eunicella singularis. In time it engulfs these gorgonians and produces its own rigid skeleton, making it self-supporting. It can grow to a height of 2 metres (6 feet) with a trunk diameter of 14 cm (5.5 in). The skeleton is rich in histidine and contains the unusual ecdysterone, ajugasterone-C. The growth rate of the colony is slow and carbon-14 dating techniques have given an age of 2,700 years, giving this zoanthid one of the longest lifespans of any organism on Earth. Because of its longevity and its large, rigid three-dimensional skeleton, it is considered to be a habitat modifier, reducing current velocity, stabilising sedimentation and increasing local deposition of fine particles. It also promotes biodiversity on the seabed.

The polyps of S. savaglia feed by capturing plankton and other particles from the water, and can also absorb dissolved nutrients.

Colonies of S. savaglia are either male or female. At a study site in the northwestern Mediterranean at 67 metres (220 ft), there were found to be more female colonies than male. Spawning took place in December when the seawater started to cool. This zoanthid can also reproduce asexually.
