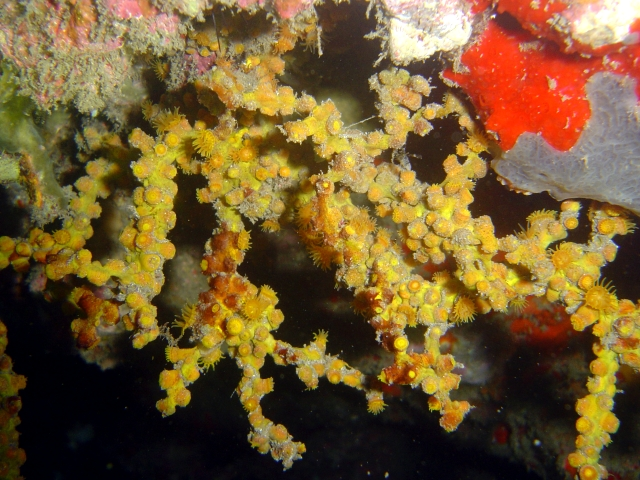
- Savalia savaglia

Scientific classification
- Kingdom: Animalia
- Phylum: Cnidaria
- Subphylum: Anthozoa
- Class: Hexacorallia
- Order: Zoantharia
- Family: Parazoanthidae
- Genus: Savalia; Nardo, 1844

Species
- See text

Synonyms
- Gerardia Lacaze-Duthiers, 1864

= Savalia (cnidarian) =

Genus of cnidarians in the coral and sea anemone class Anthozoa

Savalia is a genus of sea anemone-like anthozoans in the order Zoantharia.

== Species ==
The World Register of Marine Species recognizes the following two species:

- Savalia lucifica (Cutress C.E. & Pequegnat W.E., 1960)
- Savalia savaglia (Bertoloni, 1819)
