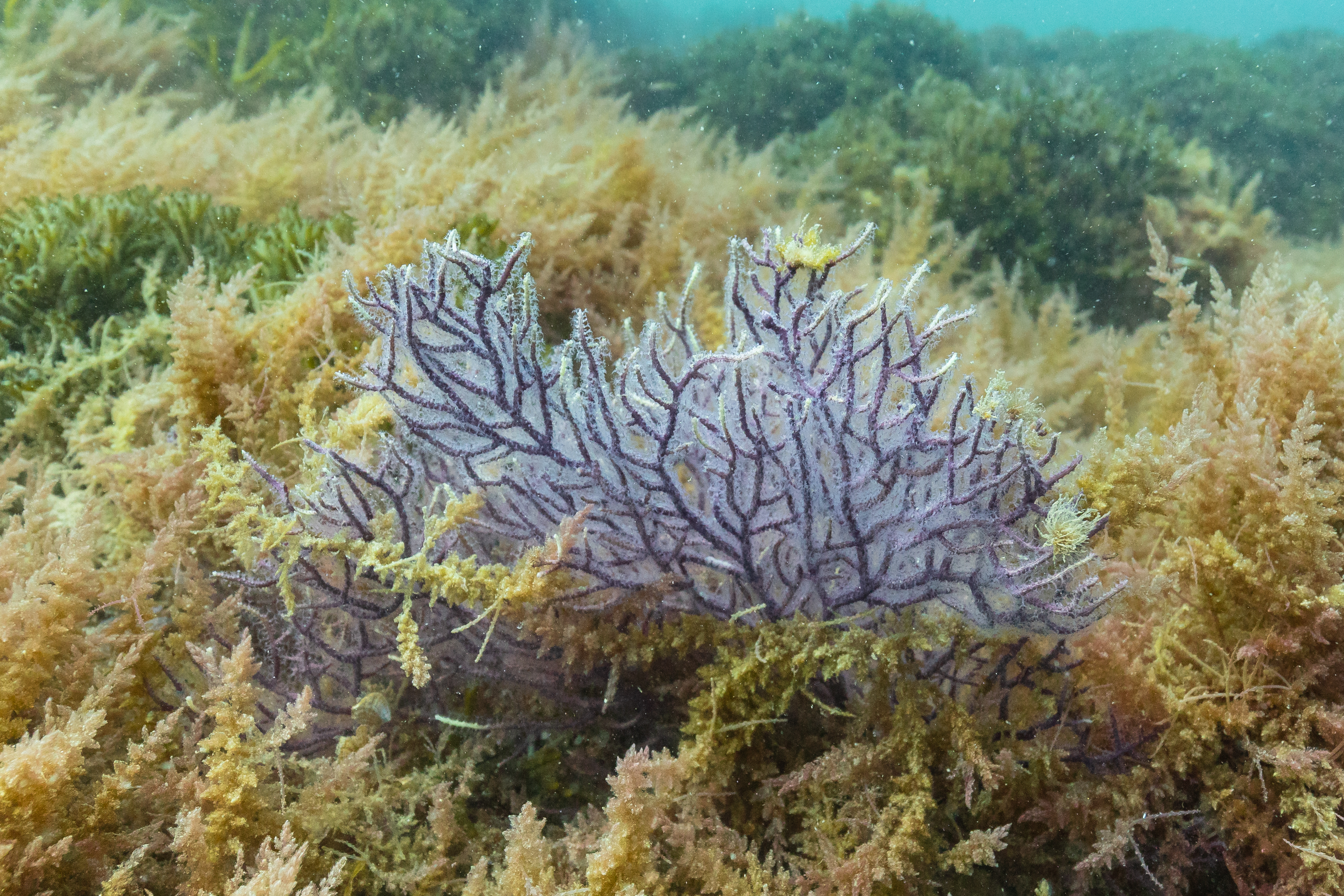

Conservation status
- Least Concern (IUCN 3.1) (Mediterranean)

Scientific classification
- Kingdom: Animalia
- Phylum: Cnidaria
- Subphylum: Anthozoa
- Class: Octocorallia
- Order: Malacalcyonacea
- Family: Gorgoniidae
- Genus: Leptogorgia
- Species: L. sarmentosa

Binomial name
- Leptogorgia sarmentosa (Esper, 1789)

Synonyms
- Leptogorgia lusitanica Stiasny, 1937

= Leptogorgia sarmentosa =

Species of coral

Leptogorgia sarmentosa is a species of colonial soft coral, a sea fan in the family Gorgoniidae. It is native to the eastern Atlantic Ocean and the western Mediterranean Sea, with a single find in the eastern Mediterranean.

== Description ==
Leptogorgia sarmentosa forms a branching, tree-like structure that can grow to a height of 60 cm (24 in). Although the branches are sometimes in a single plane, more commonly they emerge from the main stem in various directions. The terminal branchlets are very slender, either straight or slightly drooping. The sclerites which give rigidity to the soft tissues are dark red, translucent and needle-like. The colour of the coenenchyme (the thin fleshy external covering) is usually orange but may instead be yellow, white, red or purple. The polyps are very small and are the same colour as the rest of the coral. They are arranged randomly around the branches. This species can be confused with Eunicella verrucosa but that species has shorter more robust twigs and the coenenchyme is rough and warty.

== Distribution and habitat ==
Leptogorgia sarmentosa is found along the Atlantic coast of Europe and Africa between the Bay of Biscay and the Gulf of Guinea, and in the western part of the Mediterranean Sea and the Adriatic Sea. Its range in the Mediterranean has been extended by the discovery of a colony at Naxos in the Aegean Sea. It typically grows in the depth range 10 to 300 m (33 to 984 ft) on boulders lying on sandy areas of the seabed or on bedrock partially overlaid by soft sediment. It is found in a range of current velocities but particularly favours locations with strong water movement.

== Biology ==
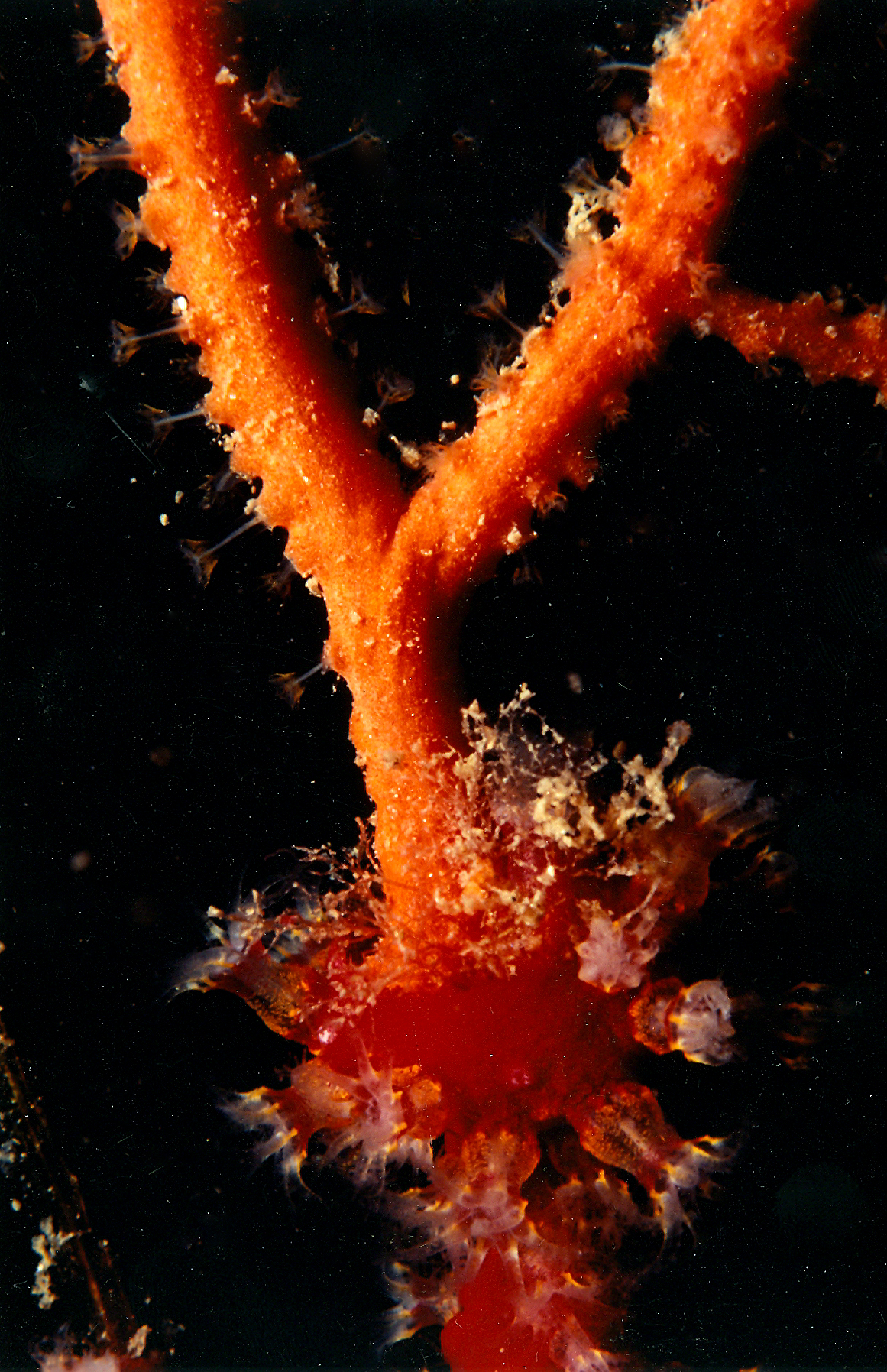
Leptogorgia sarmentosa with polyps extended, colonised by Alcyonium coralloides

Leptogorgia sarmentosa is a suspension feeder. The polyps extend their tentacles to filter particles from the water flowing past the colony. The diet includes zooplankton such as dinoflagellates, diatoms and ciliates as well as particles of organic detritus.

Colonies are either male or female. Sperm is released into the sea from male colonies and the eggs are fertilised internally inside the female colonies. The embryos develop at first in the gastric cavities of the polyps but are liberated as planula larvae which drift with the currents as part of the plankton for several weeks. When ready to undergo metamorphosis they settle on suitable surfaces and develop into new polyps. The new colonies that form from these grow by budding new polyps. The branches grow at about 2 to 5 cm (0.8 to 2.0 in) per year.
