= Capo Ferro Lighthouse =

Lighthouse in Italy

Capo Ferro
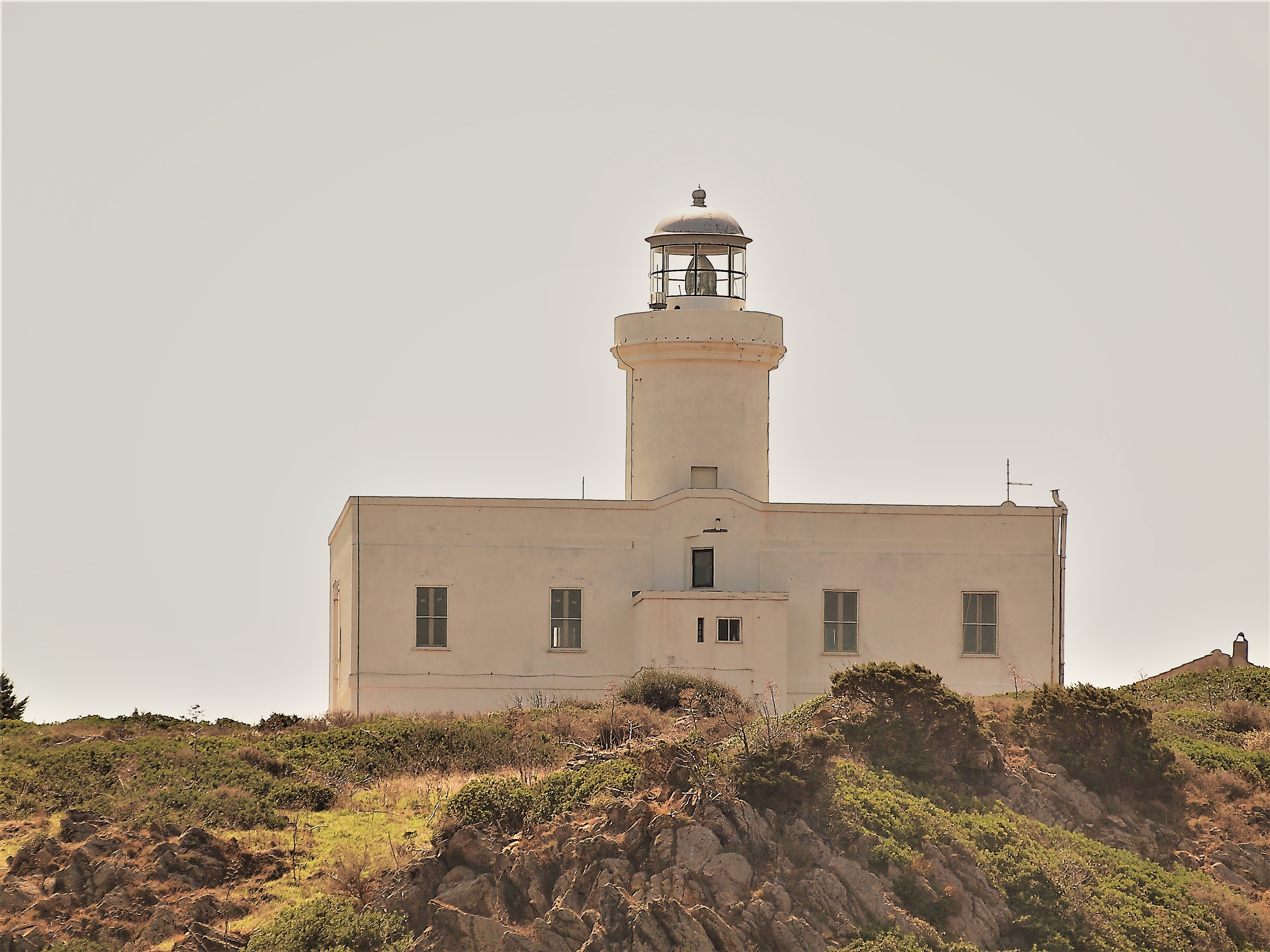
- Capo Ferro Lighthouse
- Location: Capo Ferro; Arzachena; Sardinia; Italy
- Coordinates: 41°09′18″N 9°31′24″E

Tower
- Constructed: 1861
- Foundation: masonry base
- Construction: masonry tower
- Automated: yes
- Height: 18 metres (59 ft)
- Shape: cylindrical tower with balcony and lantern atop a 2-storey keeper's house
- Markings: white tower and keeper's house, grey lantern dome
- Power source: mains electricity
- Operator: Marina Militare
- Fog signal: no

Light
- First lit: 1861
- Focal height: 52 metres (171 ft)
- Lens: Type ORT3 375; Focal length: 187.5 mm
- Intensity: main: AL 1000 W reserve: LABI 100 W
- Range: main: 24 nautical miles (44 km; 28 mi) reserve: 18 nautical miles (33 km; 21 mi)
- Characteristic: Fl (3) W 15 s.
- Italy no.: 1146 E.F.

Capo Ferro Lighthouse (Italian: Faro di Capo Ferro) is an active lighthouse located on the same name promontory which marks the southern entrance to the Strait of Bonifacio and to the Maddalena archipelago, in the municipality of Arzachena, in the north east of Sardinia, Italy, on the Tyrrhenian Sea.

== Description ==
The lighthouse, built in 1858, was activated by the Regia Marina only in 1861 and consists of a masonry white cylindrical tower, 18 metres (59 ft) high, with balcony and lantern rising from a 2-storey white keeper's house. The lantern, which mounts an optics of the Type ORT3 375 with a Focal length of 187.5 mm., is painted in white, the dome in grey metallic, and it is positioned at 52 metres (171 ft) above sea level emitting three white flashes in a 15 seconds period visible up to a distance of 24 nautical miles (44 km; 28 mi). The lighthouse is completely automated and operated by the Marina Militare with the identification code number 1146 E.F.

== See also ==
- List of lighthouses in Italy
- Arzachena
