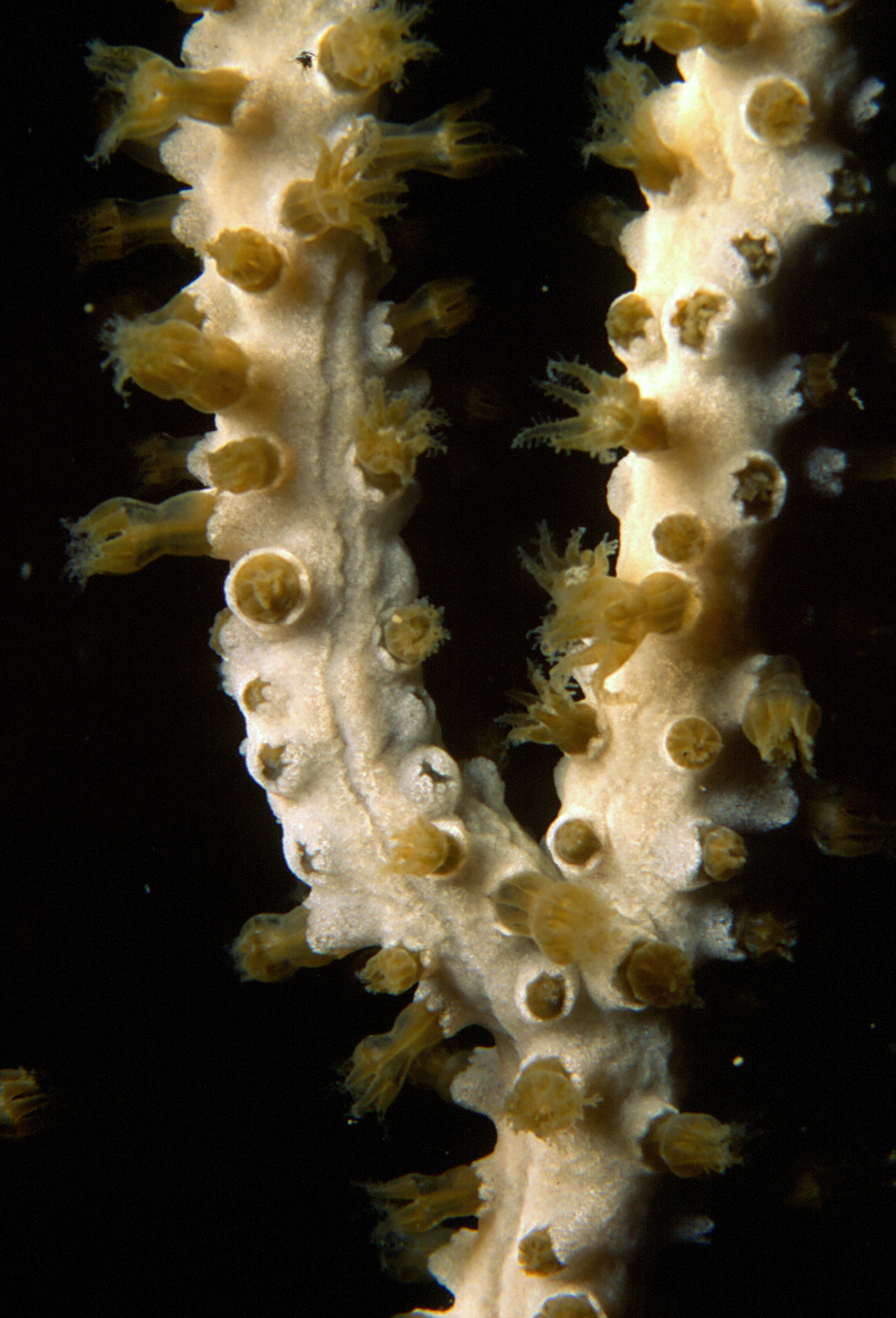
- Eunicella singularis

Scientific classification
- Kingdom: Animalia
- Phylum: Cnidaria
- Subphylum: Anthozoa
- Class: Octocorallia
- Order: Malacalcyonacea
- Family: Eunicellidae
- Genus: Eunicella; Verrill, 1869

Species
- See text

= Eunicella =

Genus of corals

Eunicella is a genus of coral in the Gorgoniidae family.

== Species ==
The World Register of Marine Species lists the following species:

- Eunicella alba (Esper, 1766)
- Eunicella albatrossi Stiasny
- Eunicella albicans (Kolliker, 1865)
- Eunicella cavolini (Koch, 1887)
- Eunicella ctenocelloides Stiasny, 1936
- Eunicella dawydoffi Stiasny, 1938
- Eunicella densa Kükenthal, 1917
- Eunicella dubia Studer, 1890
- Eunicella filifica Grasshoff, 1992
- Eunicella filiformis (Studer, 1879)
- Eunicella filum Grasshoff, 1992
- Eunicella furcata (Koch)
- Eunicella gazella Studer, 1878
- Eunicella germaini Stiasny, 1937
- Eunicella gracilis Grasshoff, 1992
- Eunicella granulata Grasshoff, 1992
- Eunicella hendersoni Kükenthal, 1908
- Eunicella kochi (Studer, 1901)
- Eunicella labiata Thomson, 1927
- Eunicella lata Kükenthal, 1917
- Eunicella modesta Verrill, 1883
- Eunicella multituberculata Stiasny, 1935
- Eunicella palma (Esper)
- Eunicella papillifera Edwards & Haime, 1857
- Eunicella papillosa (Esper, 1797)
- Eunicella pendula Kükenthal, 1908
- Eunicella pergamentacea Ridley, 1882
- Eunicella pillsbury Grasshoff, 1992
- Eunicella pustulosa Stiasny, 1935
- Eunicella racemosa (Milne-Edwards & Haime, 1857)
- Eunicella rigida Kükenthal, 1908
- Eunicella singularis (Esper, 1791)
- Eunicella tenuis Verrill, 1869
- Eunicella tricoronata Velimirov, 1971
- Eunicella verrucosa (Pallas, 1766)
