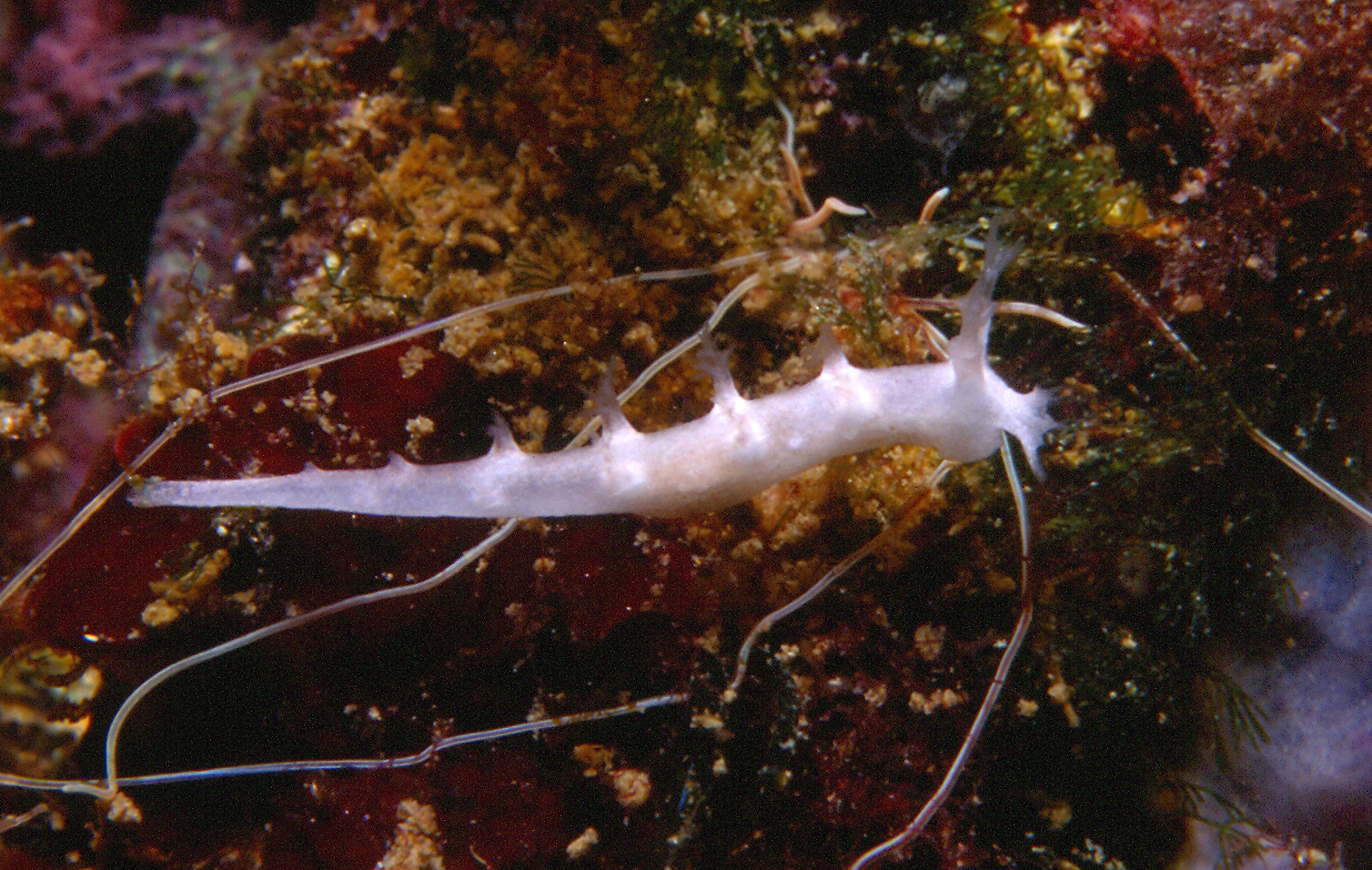
- White individual of Duvaucelia odhneri from France

Scientific classification
- Kingdom: Animalia
- Phylum: Mollusca
- Class: Gastropoda
- Order: Nudibranchia
- Suborder: Tritoniacea
- Family: Tritoniidae
- Genus: Duvaucelia
- Species: D. odhneri

Binomial name
- Duvaucelia odhneri J. Tardy, 1963

Synonyms
- Tritonia nilsodhneri Marcus, 1983

= Duvaucelia odhneri =

Species of gastropod

Duvaucelia odhneri, is a species of dendronotid nudibranch. It is a marine gastropod mollusc in the family Tritoniidae.

The specific name odhneri is in honour of Swedish malacologist Nils Hjalmar Odhner. This species was originally described as Duvaucelia odhneri but this became a homonym of Tritonia odhneri Marcus, 1959 when the genus Duvaucelia was moved within Tritonia in 1983. In 2020 the genus Duvaucelia was brought back into use and the name reverted to the original combination of Tardy, 1963.

== Distribution ==
This species is found in the north Atlantic Ocean off the United Kingdom, Ireland and France. It is also reported from South Africa but DNA evidence suggests that this is a distinct, as yet un-named, species. Around the South African coast this species is found on both sides of the Cape Peninsula. It is known from 10–30 m.

== Description ==
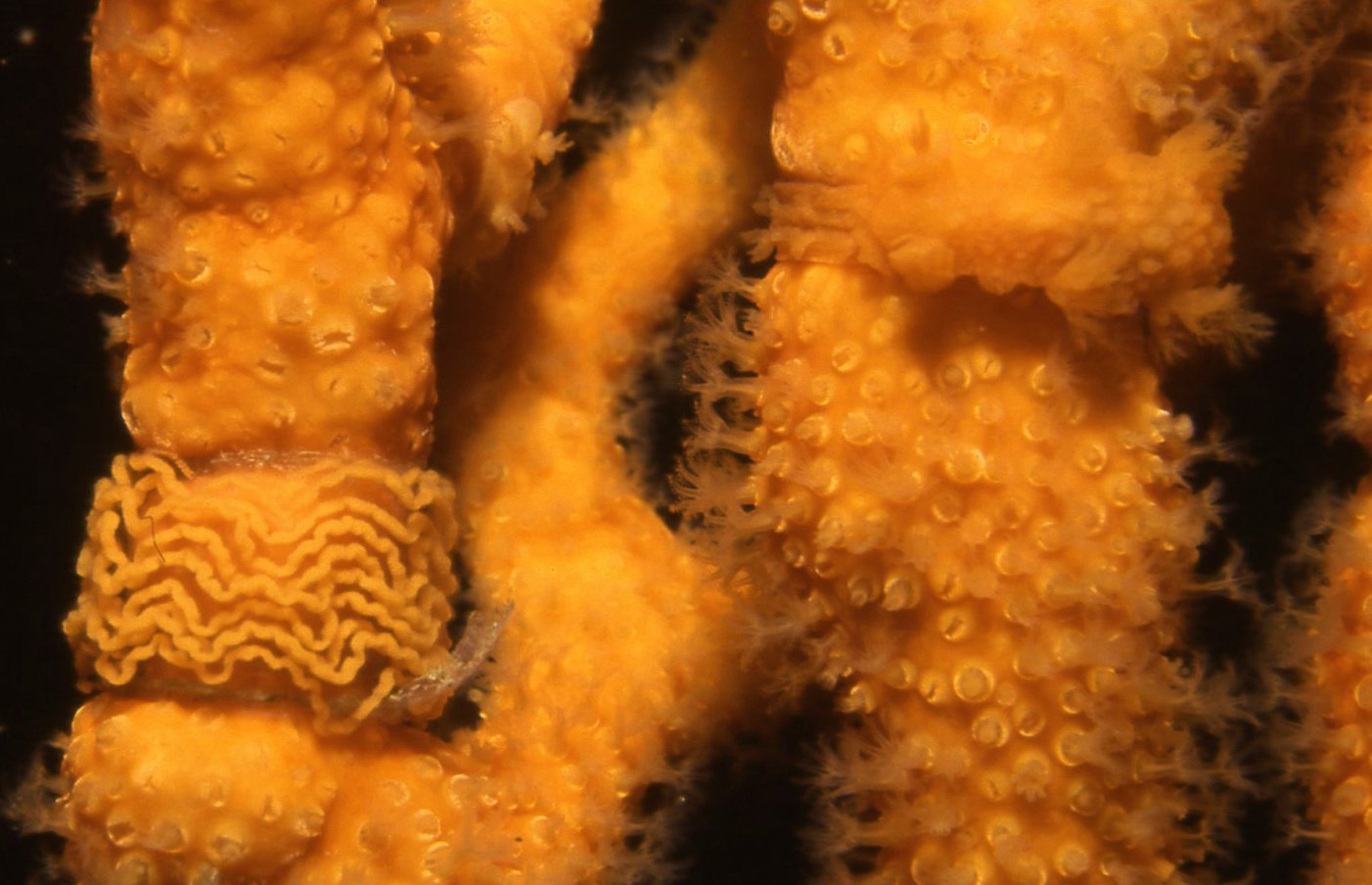
Camouflage: the South African whip fan nudibranch and its egg ribbon

The South African whip fan nudibranch is a well-camouflaged animal which mimics the gorgonians on which it feeds. It is a small nudibranch, reaching 30 mm. Its branched rhinophores extend from cup-like sheaths. Paired branching projections down the length of the body resemble the feeding polyps of its prey species of sea fan.

== Ecology ==
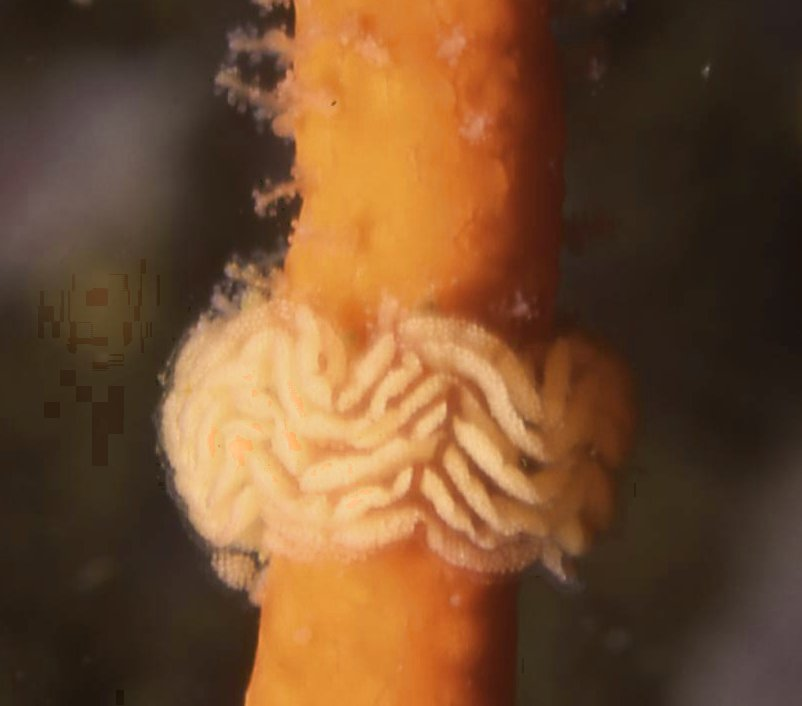
The egg ribbon

The whip fan nudibranch feeds on gorgonians of the genus Eunicella. It lays a thin zigzag spiral of eggs around the main axis of these sea fans. The egg mass is also coloured to match the gorgonians.
