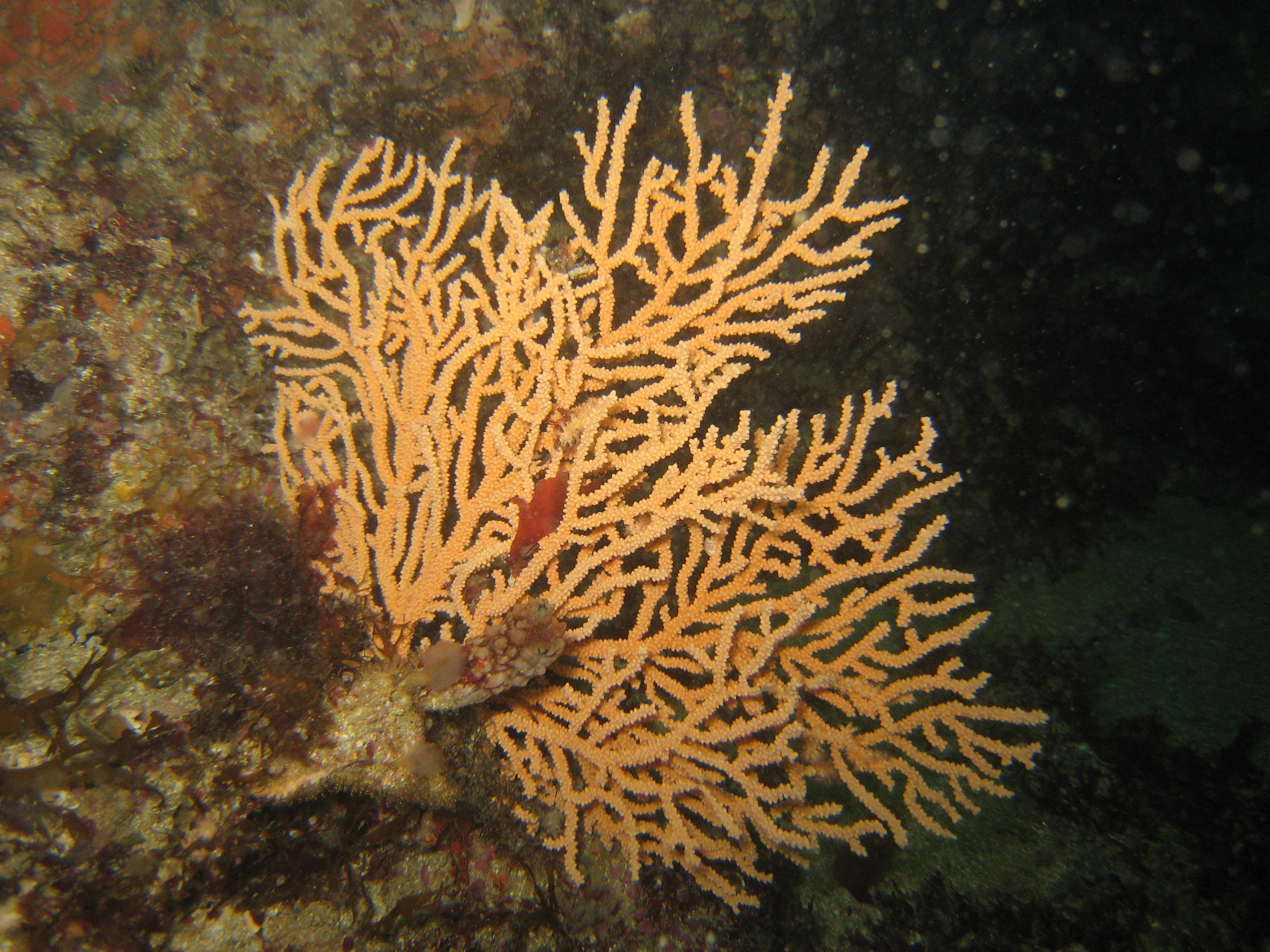

Conservation status
- Vulnerable (IUCN 2.3)

Scientific classification
- Kingdom: Animalia
- Phylum: Cnidaria
- Subphylum: Anthozoa
- Class: Octocorallia
- Order: Malacalcyonacea
- Family: Eunicellidae
- Genus: Eunicella
- Species: E. verrucosa

Binomial name
- Eunicella verrucosa (Pallas, 1766)

= Eunicella verrucosa =

Broad sea fan

Species of coral

Eunicella verrucosa, the broad sea fan, pink sea fan or warty gorgonian, is a species of colonial Gorgonian "soft coral" in the family Gorgoniidae. It is native to the north-eastern Atlantic Ocean and the western Mediterranean Sea.

== Description ==
Eunicella verrucosa has a densely branching, fan-like stem and usually grows in a single plane. It orientates itself at right angles to the direction of water movement and can grow to a height of 50 cm (20 in), although 25 cm (10 in) is a more usual size. Stems and branches are covered with wart-like growths from which the polyps protrude. The colour can vary from red, through pink to white.

== Distribution ==
Eunicella verrucosa is native to the northeastern Atlantic and the western Mediterranean Sea. Its range extends from the southwestern coasts of Britain and Ireland to France, Spain, Italy, Algeria, Morocco, Western Sahara and Mauritania. A recent study of genetic connectivity in Eunicella verrucosa identified marked population structure between samples from northwest Ireland, Britain, France and southern Portugal. It is found growing on rock, timber, metal or concrete and its depth range is 4 to 50 metres (13 to 164 ft). In British waters this sea fan has become scarcer, possibly being damaged by dredging but may benefit from higher seawater temperatures.

== Biology ==
Eunicella verrucosa is usually orientated at right angles to the direction of water flow across the colony. The polyps expand and spread out their tentacles to feed. The nutrients are passed to other parts of the colony through the internal channels connecting the polyps.

Reproduction in Eunicella verrucosa has been little studied. The planula larvae are likely to be lecithotrophic (sustained by a yolk-sac) and able to drift for a short time before settling on the seabed where they develop into polyps and found new colonies. The growth rate of colonies varies; in Lyme Bay in southern Britain, some colonies grew by 6 cm (2 in) in one year while in another year, did not grow at all. The sea fan anemone (Amphianthus dohrnii) is often found living on Eunicella verrucosa.
