= Coenenchyme =

Tissue surrounding the polyps in octocorals

Coenenchyme is the common tissue that surrounds and links the polyps in octocorals. It consists of mesoglea penetrated by tubes (solenia) and canals of the gastrodermis and contains sclerites, microscopic mineralised spicules of silica or of calcium carbonate. The outer layer of the coenenchyme is made of columnar or squamous epithelial cells, and can be covered in microvilli. The stiff projecting portion of coenenchyme that surrounds each polyp is usually reinforced by modified sclerites and is called the calyx, a term borrowed from botany. The solenia circulate nutrients throughout the coenenchyme. Coenosarc is an alternative name.
