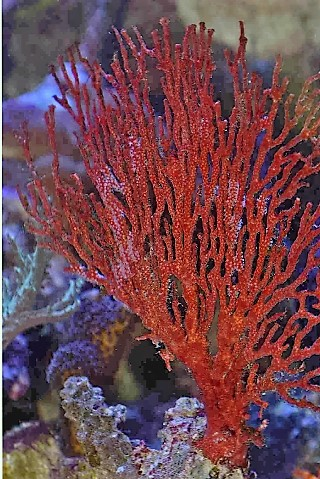

Scientific classification
- Kingdom: Animalia
- Phylum: Cnidaria
- Subphylum: Anthozoa
- Class: Octocorallia
- Order: Malacalcyonacea
- Family: Gorgoniidae
- Genus: Leptogorgia
- Species: L. hebes

Binomial name
- Leptogorgia hebes Verrill, 1869

= Leptogorgia hebes =

Species of coral

Leptogorgia hebes, commonly known as the regal sea fan or false sea fan, is a species of soft coral in the family Gorgoniidae. It was formerly included in the genus Lophogorgia but that genus has been dismantled.

== Description ==
The regal sea fan is a colonial coral averaging about 6 inches (15 cm) in height. It has a horny axial skeleton made of a fibrous protein called gorgonin covered with coenenchyme, a thin layer of living tissue from which the polyps protrude. Embedded in the coenenchyme are minute capstan-shaped and rod-shaped calcified sclerites. As well as strengthening the tissue, these are distasteful to most predators. The coral is densely branched but usually grows in a single plane. The colour varies and is usually some shade of red, orange or deep yellow but purple specimens occasionally occur. The skeleton is not rigid so the whole fan-like structure can sway with the movement of the surrounding water. The polyps are white and project in alternate rows from slit-shaped openings in hemispherical calyces on the branches. Each polyp can retract into its calyx and has eight pinnate tentacles and eight mesenteries dividing the body cavity. The whole colony has a single siphonoglyph, an opening through which water enters the structure.

== Distribution ==
The regal sea fan is found in the western Atlantic Ocean from Chesapeake Bay, Georgia and Florida to the Gulf of Mexico and off the coast of Venezuela and Brazil. It is found on shallow reefs at depths ranging from 25 to 130 feet (7.6 to 39.6 m). It is tolerant of low salinity levels (26 to 36 parts per thousand of salt equivalent) and a moderate degree of wave action. It usually grows on limestone or rock ledges.

== Biology ==
The polyps of the regal sea fan extend their tentacles to feed and gather plankton and small organisms from the surrounding water.

Individual colonies are either male or female. Females start breeding at the age of two whereas the males do not do so until they are six years old. In a study in the Gulf of Mexico, where this species is a dominant member of the shallow reef community, it was found that the female gonads began developing in January and the male gonads in April. Both became ripe in August when the eggs and sperm were liberated into the sea in a synchronised spawning event. It was unclear precisely what triggered the spawning but it may have been connected to the date of the full moon.

== Ecology ==
The regal sea fan is part of a biodiverse reef community. Amphipods such as Ericthonius brasiliensis are often found climbing on the branches which provide them with an elevated position from which to feed. The skeleton shrimp (Caprella equilibra) grasps the sea fan with its posterior appendages and resembles a bit of attached seaweed. The sea whip slug (Tritonia wellsi) feeds on the soft tissues of the sea fan. It is difficult to detect because it is disguised by having numerous small appendages called cerata which closely resemble the sea fan polyps. Another well disguised predator is the sea whip shrimp (Neopontonides beaufortensis ).
