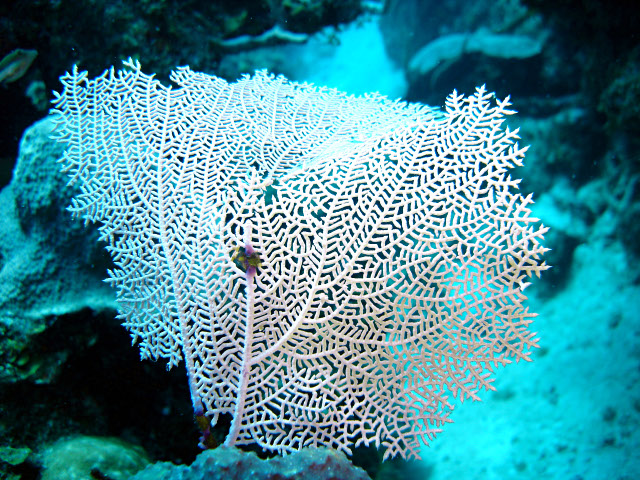

Scientific classification
- Kingdom: Animalia
- Phylum: Cnidaria
- Subphylum: Anthozoa
- Class: Octocorallia
- Order: Malacalcyonacea
- Family: Gorgoniidae
- Genus: Gorgonia
- Species: G. mariae

Binomial name
- Gorgonia mariae Bayer, 1961

= Gorgonia mariae =

Species of coral

Gorgonia mariae, commonly known as the wide-mesh sea fan, is a species of sea fan, a sessile colonial soft coral in the family Gorgoniidae. It occurs in the tropical western Atlantic Ocean and the Caribbean Sea at depths down to about 50 m (160 ft).

== Description ==
G. mariae is the smallest sea fan in the Caribbean, growing to a height of about 30 cm (12 in). The much-branched structure is mostly two dimensional, and as it enlarges, the branches become cross-connected to form a net. The branches are only slightly compressed and the side branches are pinnately divided. The colour varies; most specimens are whitish and others are yellow, and often some violet colour is seen near the base. Two other growth forms exist in the Caribbean; one has many short, free branches on one or both faces of the net; the other, which is usually bright yellow, has the lower part of the colony anastomising and net-like, while the upper and outer parts have free branches. The supporting axial rod in the main stem and branches is formed of gorgonin, calcified to some extent, a flexible and almost unbreakable material. This enables the gorgonian to brace itself and sway with the current so that the polyps can expand to feed.

== Distribution ==
The species is native to the tropical western Atlantic Ocean and Caribbean Sea. It is found anchored to the seabed in moderately deep water, ranging in depth from about 5 to 47 m (20 to 150 ft).

== Biology ==
In G. mariae, the gametes are shed into the coelenteron or body cavity of each polyp and pass through the mouth into the open sea, where fertilisation takes place. The fertilised egg develops into a planula larva, which is planktonic. The tentacles, septa, and pharynx begin to develop before the larva settles on its aboral (non-mouth) end and metamorphs into a juvenile sea fan.

In 1995, a disease affected gorgonians in the Caribbean, with Gorgonia flabellum and Gorgonia ventalina being particularly affected. A terrestrial Aspergillus, a pathogenic fungus, was found to be responsible, and G. mariae was also susceptible. The symptoms included tissue dieback, abnormal tufts of growth, and some purpling of affected areas. The disease varied in severity from mild to severe, with full recovery taking place on some occasions and mass deaths on others. Aspergillosis sydowii, a common species found in soil, had not previously been known to affect marine invertebrates.
