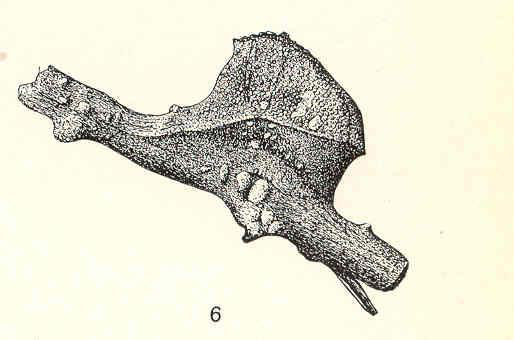
- Conopea galeata on Leptogorgia virgulata

Scientific classification
- Kingdom: Animalia
- Phylum: Arthropoda
- Clade: Pancrustacea
- Class: Thecostraca
- Subclass: Cirripedia
- Order: Balanomorpha
- Family: Balanidae
- Genus: Conopea
- Species: C. galeata

Binomial name
- Conopea galeata (Linnaeus, 1771)

Synonyms
- Balanus galeatus (Linnaeus, 1771)

= Conopea galeata =

Species of barnacle

Conopea galeata is a species of colonial barnacle in the family Archaeobalanidae. It lives exclusively on gorgonians in the western Atlantic Ocean, the Caribbean Sea and the Gulf of Mexico.

== Description ==
Conopea galeata grows to a diameter of about 1.5 cm (0.6 in). The basal plate by which it adheres to its host gorgonian is boat-shaped. The other main plates are the carina and the carinolaterals, but these are not visible because the coenenchyme (soft tissue) of the host overgrows the plates of the barnacle, apart from a gap through which the crustacean extends its cirri to feed. The plates have brown and white markings, but the barnacle may take on the gorgonian's colouring, which may be some shade of red, purple, orange, yellow or white.

The species is androdioecious.

== Distribution and habitat ==
Conopea galeata is found in the southeastern United States, the Caribbean Sea and the Gulf of Mexico where it grows on the sea whip Leptogorgia virgulata, which is found growing on reefs and rocks at depths down to about 20 m (66 ft).

== Ecology ==
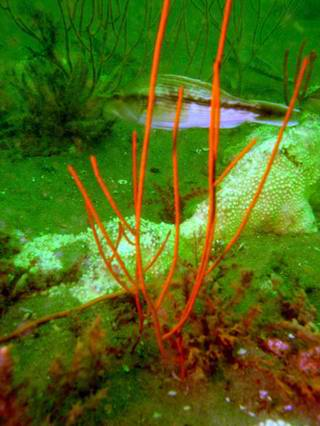
Leptogorgia virgulata in the Gulf of Florida

A number of different invertebrates live in symbiosis with L. virgulata. Besides C. galeata, these include a small shrimp Neopontonides beaufortensis, a nudibranch Tritonia wellsi, a bivalve mollusc Pteria colymbus, two species of copepod and a gastropod mollusc Simnialena uniplicata. The gorgonian uses chemical defences to prevent barnacles, bryozoans and algae from growing on the twigs, exuding protective chemicals which inhibit settlement of their larvae. However, the larvae of C. galeata settle on the old egg masses of the snail S. uniplicata, before drilling down to the gorgonian's axis and anchoring themselves in place. When the egg mass has disintegrated, the coenenchyme grows to envelop the barnacle, apart from a narrow opening. The presence of the barnacle causes a significant bump on its host.
