= Leptogorgia capensis =

Scientific classification
- Kingdom: Animalia
- Phylum: Cnidaria
- Subphylum: Anthozoa
- Class: Octocorallia
- Order: Malacalcyonacea
- Family: Gorgoniidae
- Genus: Leptogorgia
- Species: L. capensis

Binomial name
- Leptogorgia capensis Hickson, 1900

Synonyms
- Gorgonia capensis Hickson, 1900

Species of soft coral

Leptogorgia capensis is a species of sea fan in the family Gorgoniidae. It was described by Sydney John Hickson in 1900. It occurs on the coast of South Africa, in the extreme east of the Atlantic Ocean and in the western Indian Ocean.
