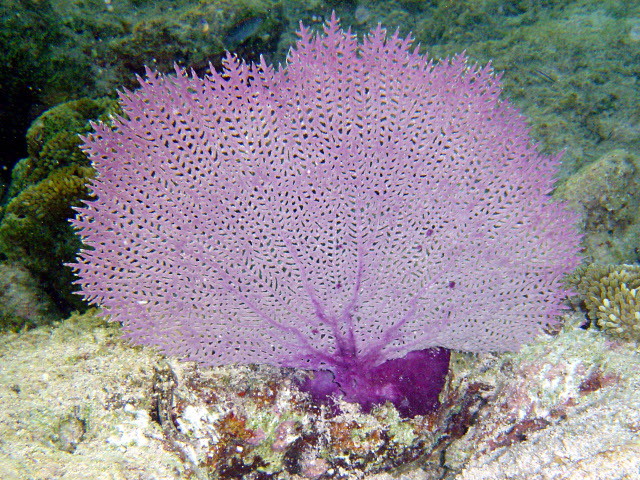

Conservation status
- Vulnerable (NatureServe)

Scientific classification
- Kingdom: Animalia
- Phylum: Cnidaria
- Subphylum: Anthozoa
- Class: Octocorallia
- Order: Malacalcyonacea
- Family: Gorgoniidae
- Genus: Gorgonia
- Species: G. ventalina

Binomial name
- Gorgonia ventalina Linnaeus, 1758

= Gorgonia ventalina =

Species of coral

Gorgonia ventalina, the common sea fan and purple sea fan, is a species of sea fan, an octocoral in the family Gorgoniidae. It is found in the western Atlantic Ocean and the Caribbean Sea.

== Description ==
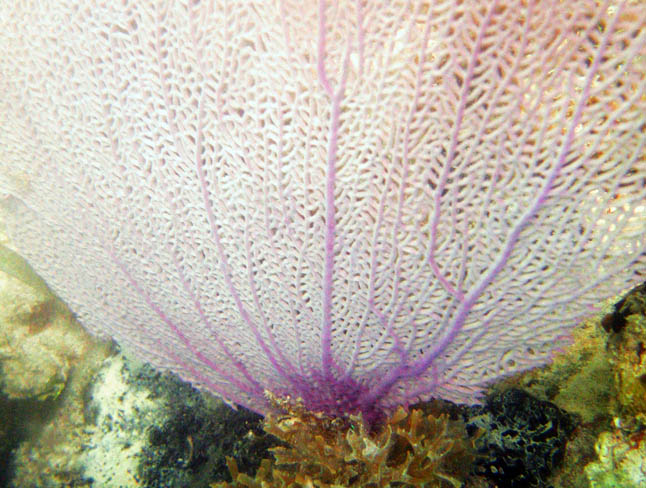
G. ventalina

G. ventalina is a fan-shaped colonial coral with several main branches and a latticework of linking smaller branches. The skeleton is composed of calcite and gorgonin, a collagen-like compound. The calyces in which the polyps are embedded are in two rows along the branches. Many of the smaller branches are compressed in the plane of the fan, which distinguishes this species from the Venus sea fan (Gorgonia flabellum). It often has small accessory fans growing out sideways from the main fan. It grows to 1.5 m (5 ft) tall and is variable in colour, being whitish, yellow, or pale purple. The main branches are often purple and the fan is orientated at right angles to the current.

== Distribution and habitat ==
The purple sea fan is found in the western Atlantic and Caribbean, with a range extending from Bermuda and Florida and the Gulf of Mexico to Curaçao. It grows near the shore in shallow water in areas with strong wave action and on deeper outer reefs with strong currents down to a depth of about 15 m (49 ft).

== Ecology ==
G. ventalina is a filter feeder. Each polyp extends its eight tentacles to catch plankton drifting past on the current. Its tissues contain symbiotic dinoflagellate Symbiodinium spp., which are photosynthetic and use sunlight to create organic carbon compounds which are then available to the host coral.

The skeleton of G. ventalina contains hard structures known as sclerites which are unpalatable to predators. It also contains certain secondary metabolites in its tissues which are distasteful. The nudibranch Tritonia hamnerorum seems undeterred by these defences and is often found associated with the coral. While feeding on the coral, it concentrates the metabolites in its tissues which render it unpleasant to potential predators. This is because T.hamnerorum sequesters the chemical compound julieannfuran from G.ventalina to use as a chemical deterrent to predators.

This coral is sometimes attacked by the fungus Aspergillus sydowii which causes aspergillosis. This results in damaged patches, galls, purpling of the tissues, and even coral death. Several epizootics have occurred in the Caribbean on corals growing in stressful conditions such as in low-salinity water in estuaries which seem especially susceptible. A parasite of the class Labyrinthulomycetes in the family Thraustochytriidae has been found to have similar effects of damaged purple patches on the fan called multifocal purple spots.

A study done in the U.S. Virgin Islands has shown that G. ventalina has a high ecological resilience with populations maintaining their densities after two hurricanes in 2017.
