= L. exigua =

L. exigua may refer to:

- Laemodonta exigua, an air-breathing snail
- Leavenworthia exigua, a flowering plant
- Lebia exigua, a ground beetle
- Lecanactis exigua, a lichenized fungus
- Lepanthes exigua, a flowering plant
- Leptanilla exigua, a North African ant
- Leptogorgia exigua, a Pacific coral
- Lissotesta exigua, a sea snail
- Lomanella exigua, a daddy longlegs
- Lycosa exigua, a wolf spider
