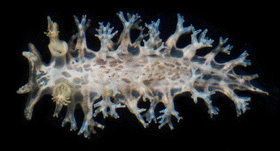
- dorsal view of Tritonicula bayeri

Scientific classification
- Kingdom: Animalia
- Phylum: Mollusca
- Class: Gastropoda
- Order: Nudibranchia
- Suborder: Tritoniacea
- Family: Tritoniidae
- Genus: Tritonicula
- Species: T. bayeri

Binomial name
- Tritonicula bayeri Ev. Marcus & Er. Marcus, 1967

Synonyms
- Tritonia bayeri Ev. Marcus & Er. Marcus, 1967; Tritonia misa Ev. Marcus & Er. Marcus, 1967; Tritonia bayeri misa Ev. Marcus & Er. Marcus, 1967

= Tritonicula bayeri =

Species of mollusc

Tritonicula bayeri is a species of dendronotid nudibranch. It is a marine gastropod mollusc in the family Tritoniidae. A number of Caribbean and western Pacific species of Tritonia were moved to a new genus Tritonicula in 2020 as a result of an integrative taxonomic study of the family Tritoniidae.

== Distribution ==
The distribution of Tritonicula bayeri includes Georgia, Florida, Belize, Honduras, Cayman Islands, Virgin Islands, Guadeloupe, Barbados and Panama.

== Description ==
The shape of the body is elongate and narrow. Rhinophoral sheaths are elevated with an irregular edge. Cerata are relatively short and branched. Edge of the oral veil is with relatively long appendages. Rhinophores are long and branched. Background color is translucent gray with a distinctive reticulate network of opaque white across the dorsum. It is up to 11 mm long.

== Ecology ==
Tritonicula bayeri was found on gorgonians and coral rubble in Panama. It inhabits reefs from 11 m down to 77 m depth. Tritonicula bayeri feeds on the octocorals Briareum asbestinum, Leptogorgia virgulata and Pseudopterogorgia sp.
