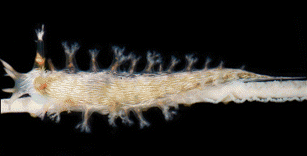
- Tritonicula hamnerorum on substrate with egg mass

Scientific classification
- Kingdom: Animalia
- Phylum: Mollusca
- Class: Gastropoda
- Order: Nudibranchia
- Suborder: Tritoniacea
- Family: Tritoniidae
- Genus: Tritonicula
- Species: T. hamnerorum

Binomial name
- Tritonicula hamnerorum (Gosliner & Ghiselin, 1987)

= Tritonicula hamnerorum =

Species of gastropod

Tritonicula hamnerorum is a species of dendronotid nudibranch. It is a marine gastropod mollusc in the family Tritoniidae. A number of Caribbean species of Tritonia were moved to a new genus Tritonicula in 2020 as a result of an integrative taxonomic study of the family Tritoniidae.

== Distribution ==
Tritonicula hamnerorum is found in the Caribbean area with its range extending from the Gulf of Mexico to Curaçao and the Cayman Islands. The distribution of Tritonicula hamnerorum includes Florida, Mexico, Belize, Bahamas, Cayman Islands and Panama.

== Description ==
The shape of the body is elongate and narrow. Rhinophores are long with branched tips. Rhinophoral sheaths are elevated with an irregular edge. Edge of the oral veil has relatively long appendages. Background colour is translucent gray with a series of irregular, longitudinal, thin white lines that run along the length of the dorsum. Its colour, pink or pale lavender, matches the colour of its host sea fan, Gorgonia ventalina. There are about twenty thin white stripes running the length of the body. There are series of nine, sparsely pinnate, gills or cerata down each side of the body. Tritonicula hamnerorum is up to 15 millimetres (0.59 in) long.

== Ecology ==
=== Habitat ===
Found in shallow water reef habitats with its host Gorgonia ventalina. Minimum recorded depth is 2 m. Maximum recorded depth is 4 m.

=== Feeding habits ===
Tritonicula hamnerorum seems to feed exclusively on Gorgonia ventalina and extensive searches failed to locate any individuals on other parts of the reef, on mangroves or in seagrass beds. Gorgonia ventalina contains secondary metabolites including one, "julieannafuran", which is distasteful to predators. Tritonicula hamnerorum seems to be unaffected by this and sequesters the compound, accumulating it in its tissues. This in turn makes the nudibranch distasteful to predatory fish, such as the bluehead wrasse (Thalassoma bifasciatum), which avoid consuming this species. This species reportedly feeds on the octocorals Gorgonia ventalina and Gorgonia flabellum.

=== Life cycle ===
This nudibranch lays small clusters containing several hundred egg capsules on branches of its host coral. The morphology of the veliger larvae that hatch from these eggs suggest that they are planktonic. Juveniles feed on the soft tissue overlying the skeleton of the sea fan while adults feed on the polyps. Within its range, the distribution of Tritonicula hamnerorum is very patchy. Usually one or a few individuals are found on a single sea fan, but very occasionally, as happened in an outbreak in 1992, a large number of juveniles occur. On this occasion, 1,700 were found in a dense aggregation on one side of an area of sea fan measuring 0.27 square metres (2.9 sq ft). Because these juveniles were all the same size, researchers hypothesized that they may not have become planktonic but may have remained on the host after hatching and fed on plankton, like their host, before undergoing metamorphosis. It was found on gorgonian sea fans in dense aggregations also in Panama.
