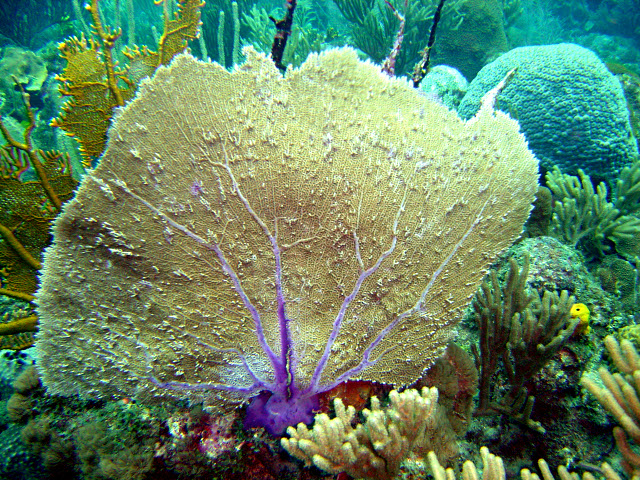
- Gorgonia flabellum

Scientific classification
- Kingdom: Animalia
- Phylum: Cnidaria
- Subphylum: Anthozoa
- Class: Octocorallia
- Order: Malacalcyonacea
- Family: Gorgoniidae
- Genus: Gorgonia; Linnaeus, 1758

Species
- 9 species (see text)

= Gorgonia =

Genus of corals

Gorgonia is a genus of soft corals, sea fans in the family Gorgoniidae. They have 8 fold symmetry, meaning that they have 8 tentacles, or tentacles in multiples of 8. Gogonias are called this because of their structure, which is made of a substance called Gorgonin.

== Species ==
The World Register of Marine Species lists these species:

- Gorgonia clathrus Pallas, 1766
- Gorgonia coarctata (Valenciennes, 1855)
- Gorgonia flabellum Linnaeus, 1758
- Gorgonia flavescens Kükenthal, 1924
- Gorgonia gracilis Verrill, 1868
- Gorgonia mariae Bayer, 1961
- Gorgonia reticulum Pallas, 1766
- Gorgonia ventalina Linnaeus, 1758
- Gorgonia venusta Dana, 1846
- Gorgonia petezichans Pallas, 1766 (nomen dubium)
