= Leptogorgia festiva =

Scientific classification
- Kingdom: Animalia
- Phylum: Cnidaria
- Subphylum: Anthozoa
- Class: Octocorallia
- Order: Malacalcyonacea
- Family: Gorgoniidae
- Genus: Leptogorgia
- Species: L. festiva

Binomial name
- Leptogorgia festiva Duchassaing & Michelotti, 1860

Species of coral

Leptogorgia festiva is a species of gorgonian sea fan in the family Gorgoniidae. It has been recorded in the Caribbean Sea.
