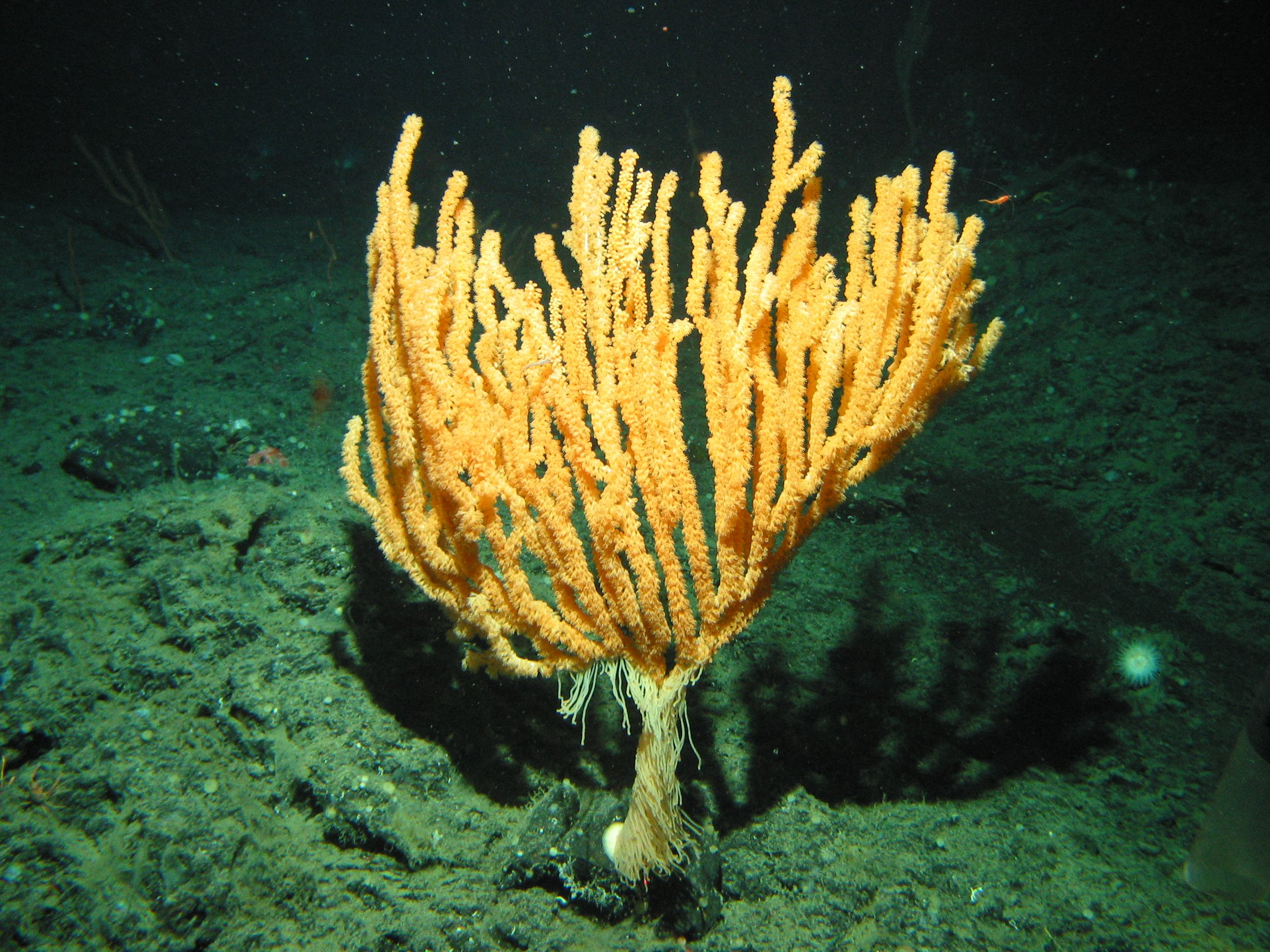
- Isidella tentaculum (Gulf of Alaska)

Scientific classification
- Kingdom: Animalia
- Phylum: Cnidaria
- Subphylum: Anthozoa
- Class: Octocorallia

= Bamboo coral =

Corals with a bamboo-like appearance

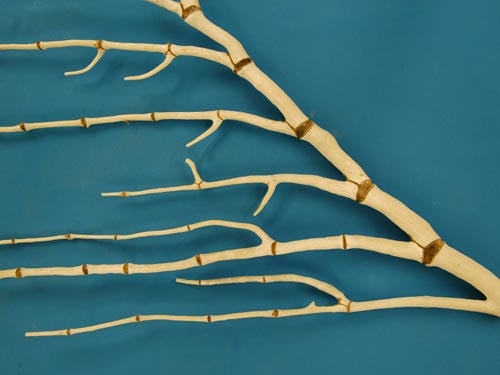
This bamboo coral branches at the gorgonin internodes.

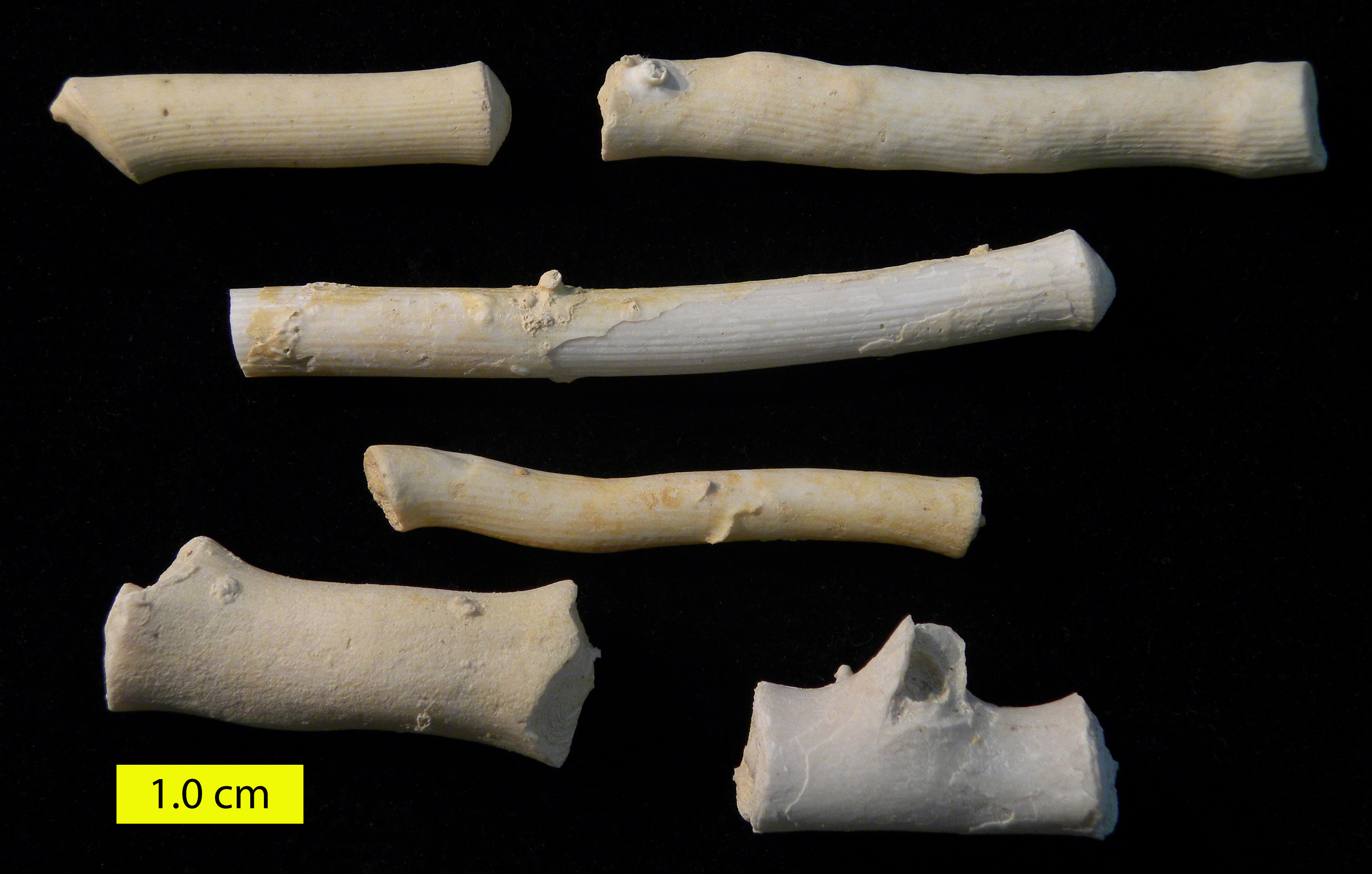
Fragments of fossil Keratoisis melitensis (Goldfuss, 1826) from the Lower Pleistocene of Cape Milazzo, Sicily, Italy

Bamboo coral is a common name for corals with a bamboo-like appearance. Bamboo coral species are included in several families of the class Octocorallia. It is a commonly recognized inhabitant of the deep sea, due to the clearly articulated skeletons of the species.

Prior to 2021, bamboo corals was the vernacular name of the family Isididae, the definition of which was completely different from its current definition (see Isididae for details). This former family Isididae was accepted prior to 2021 because its members had their articulated skeletons with proteinaceous joints, but the family was shown to be paraphyletic after it was found that this had evolved at least five separate times.

Many bamboo corals are now included in the family Keratoisididae (formerly included in Isididae as the subfamily Keratoisidinae)

As of 2023, the taxonomy of Keratoisididae is being actively revised.

== Description ==
Relatively little is known about bamboo coral. The skeletons of bamboo coral are made up of calcium carbonate in the form of tree-like branches alternating with joint-like nodes or axes composed of gorgonin protein. The alternation of the bony structures with the smaller gorgonin parts give the bamboo coral a finger-like appearance similar to that of the bamboo plant on land. Bamboo coral was reported in 2005 to have been found on a dozen seamounts in the Pacific Ocean between Santa Barbara, California, and Kodiak, Alaska. Ages and growth rates of bamboo coral in the deepest water are unknown. However, based on radiocarbon-based growth rate and age data from specimens in the Gulf of Alaska, the life span has been estimated to be between 75 and 126 years. A number of bamboo coral species are bioluminescent.

Deep sea bamboo coral provides the ecosystems to support deep sea life and also may be among the first organisms to display the effects of changes in ocean acidification caused by excess carbon dioxide, since they produce growth rings similar to those of a tree and can provide a view of changes in the condition in the deep sea over time. Some bamboo coral can be especially long-lived; coral specimens as old as 4,000 years were found at the Papahānaumokuākea Marine National Monument, giving scientists a window into the ocean's past. One scientist said the coral provided "4,000 years worth of information about what has been going on in the deep ocean interior".

Deep water coral organisms such as bamboo coral are especially affected by the practice of bottom trawling.

Some research has raised the possibility that bamboo corals, because of their potential to mimic biological properties, may potentially be used as living bone implants as well as in aquatic cultivation.

According to a 2025 article, a swath of bamboo coral was discovered along the Arctic Mid-Ocean Range, which may be the first discovered example of a bamboo coral reef. The bamboo coral was found growing atop other dead coral, a sign it may form reefs.
