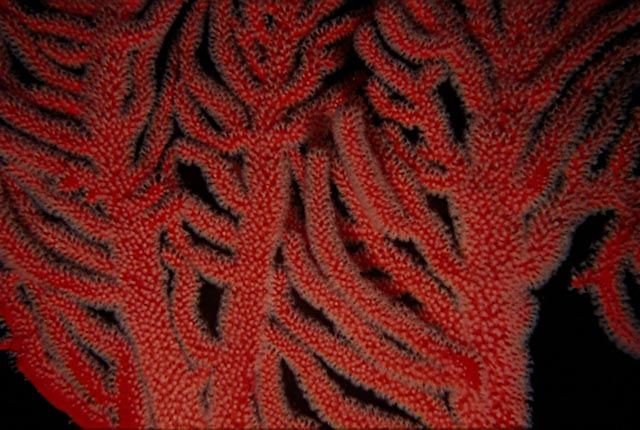
- a feeding palmate sea fan

Scientific classification
- Kingdom: Animalia
- Phylum: Cnidaria
- Subphylum: Anthozoa
- Class: Octocorallia
- Order: Malacalcyonacea
- Family: Gorgoniidae
- Genus: Leptogorgia
- Species: L. palma

Binomial name
- Leptogorgia palma (Pallas, 1766)

= Palmate sea fan =

Species of coral

The palmate sea fan (Leptogorgia palma) is a species of gorgonian sea fan in the family Gorgoniidae.

== Description ==
This fan grows up to 2 meters in total height and is bright red. It has small white polyps which retract into slits in the colony when not feeding. It has branches which fork from the central flattened trunk.

== Distribution ==
This sea fan is found only around the South African coast from the Cape Peninsula to Sodwana in 10–100 m of water. It is endemic to this region.

== Ecology ==
This fan is very slow-growing, at only 15mm per year, so large colonies may be more than 100 years old. It is eaten by a sponge crab (Pseudodromia latens), and a topshell snail (Calliostoma ornatum).
