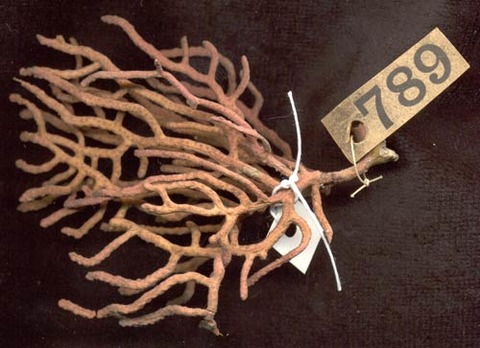

Scientific classification
- Domain: Eukaryota
- Kingdom: Animalia
- Phylum: Cnidaria
- Subphylum: Anthozoa
- Class: Octocorallia
- Order: Alcyonacea
- Family: Gorgoniidae
- Genus: Leptogorgia
- Species: L. exigua

Binomial name
- Leptogorgia exigua Verrill, 1870

= Leptogorgia exigua =

Species of coral

Leptogorgia exigua is a coral species first described by Addison Emery Verrill in 1870. Verrill initially considered this species a diminutive variant of L. cuspidata, but ultimately decided to consider L. exigua a separate species. It is native to the Pacific Ocean.
