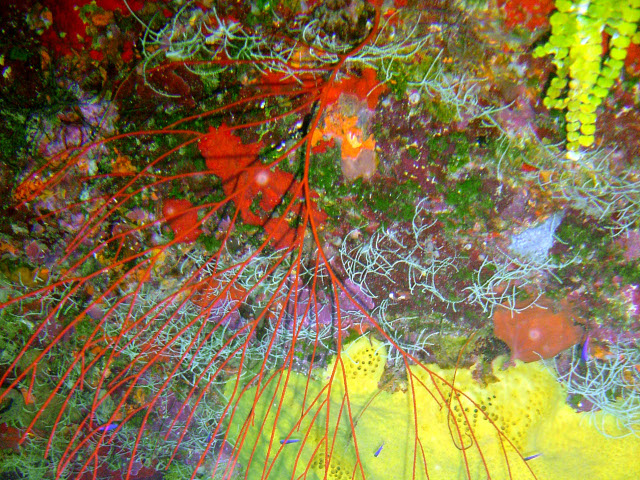

Conservation status
- Apparently Secure (NatureServe)

Scientific classification
- Kingdom: Animalia
- Phylum: Cnidaria
- Subphylum: Anthozoa
- Class: Octocorallia
- Order: Malacalcyonacea
- Family: Gorgoniidae
- Genus: Leptogorgia
- Species: L. virgulata

Binomial name
- Leptogorgia virgulata (Lamarck, 1815)

= Leptogorgia virgulata =

Species of coral

Leptogorgia virgulata, commonly known as the sea whip or colorful sea whip, is a species of soft coral in the family Gorgoniidae.

== Description ==
Leptogorgia virgulata is a colonial coral averaging about 20 cm (8 in) in height, usually between 15 and 60 cm as an adult, but sometimes reaching 1 metre (3.3 ft). It does not have the rigid calcium carbonate skeleton possessed by the true corals but its stalks have an internal, axial skeleton which is stiffened by sclerites and covered by an outer layer, the coenenchyme. It has an upright growth habit with vertical, whip-like stems, sparsely branching near the base. These are uniform in colour, ranging from white, yellow, and orange to shades of red and mauve. The polyps are arranged in several rows along both sides of each branch while the rows on older main branches have distinct grooves between them, and when the polyps are retracted the calyces do not stick out. They are translucent white and each has eight tentacles and eight mesenteries and is so classified as an octocorallian. Octocorals, as cnidarians, have stinging cnidea, or nematocysts, for feeding and defense as well. The colony has a single siphonoglyph.

== Distribution and habitat ==
Leptogorgia virgulata is found growing on rocks at depths down to 20 metres (66 ft) along the western fringes of the Atlantic Ocean, commonly found on the coastal shelfs of Southern states and on rock and limestone edges. The range extends from Chesapeake Bay south to the Gulf of Mexico and the species also occurs in Brazil. It is found on shallow water reefs, and also in estuaries and bays as it can tolerate low levels of salinity, but it typically prefers high salinity environments.

== Biology ==
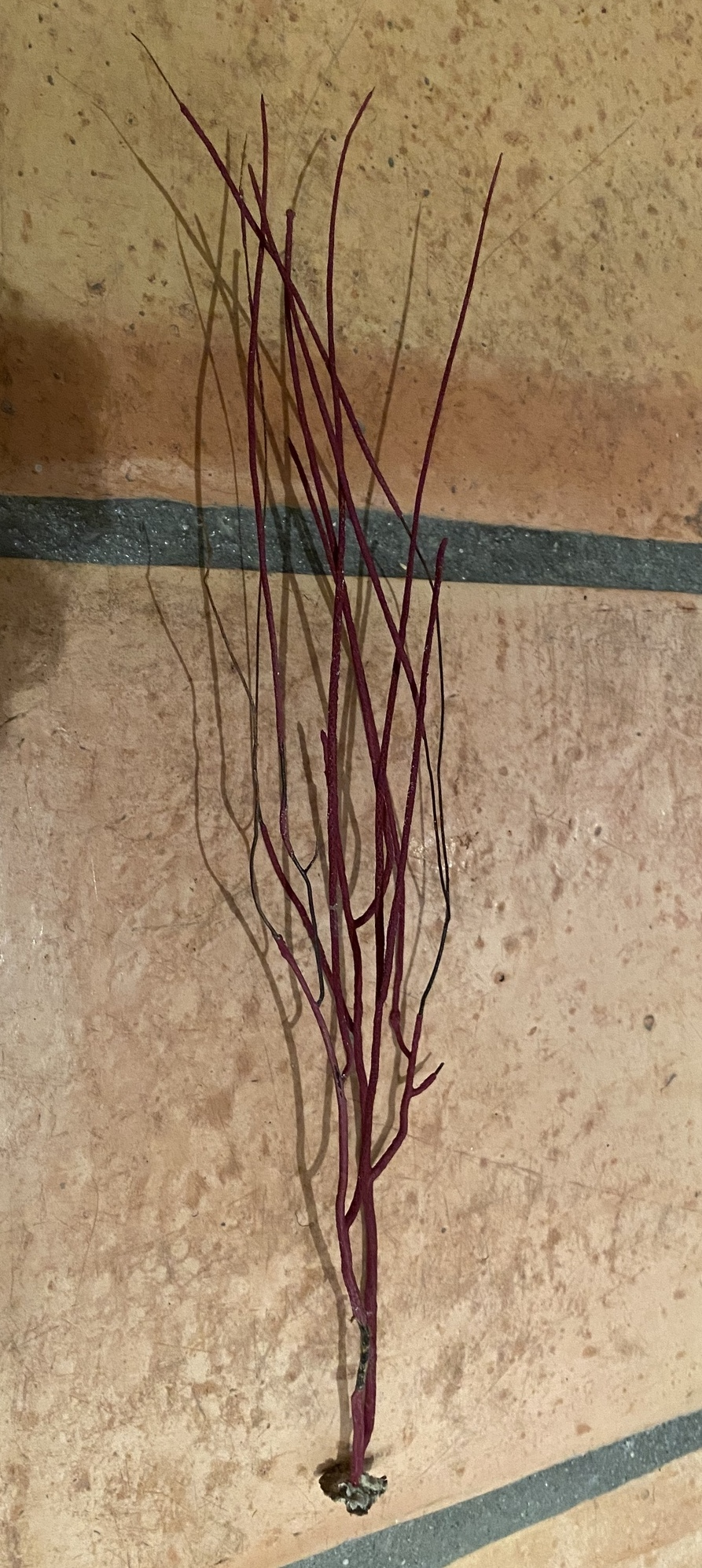
A dead Leptogorgia virgulata

The polyps are carnivores and extend their tentacles to catch zooplankton wafted past by the current.

Colonies of Leptogorgia virgulata are gonochoristic, being either male or female. Gametes are released into the water column where they are fertilised externally. The larvae are planktonic for 3–20 days and pass through a number of larval stages before settling on a suitable rocky substrate. Here they undergo metamorphosis and become feeding polyps which, in time, produce new polyps and develop into colonies. Mortality rates are high among new colonies.

== Ecology ==
Leptogorgia virgulata uses chemical defences to prevent algae, barnacles and bryozoans growing on the stalks. It exudes protective substances which inhibit settlement of larvae. These products have been investigated and are being considered for use as anti-fouling agents to prevent the growth of marine organisms on man-made structures. The snail Simnialena marferula feeds on debris around the coral and takes on the colour of the stems through assimilation of the pigments it contains. Larvae of the barnacle Conopea galeata tend to preferentially settle on the remains of the egg mass of the snail and the juvenile barnacle then becomes attached to the skeleton of the coral as the egg mass decays. In fact this barnacle is an obligate commensal and the coenenchyme of the coral grows to enclose it, leaving an aperture for the barnacle to feed and reproduce.

Leptogorgia virgulata sometimes grows in meadows of the seagrass Thalassia testudinum where it is often associated with the amphipod Caprella penantis. In winter, when the seagrass dies down, decapod crustaceans move into the area.

The oyster Pteria colymbus is often found attached to the coral. Other animals are camouflaged to resemble the coral in shape or colour. These include the shrimp Neopontonides beaufortensis and the nudibranch Tritonia wellsi, also known as the sea whip slug. It is colourless and its branching gills resemble the polyps on which it feeds.

The sclerites and certain secondary metabolites produced by Leptogorgia virgulata deter predation by fish. One such metabolite has emetic properties and has been demonstrated to produce a learning response in fish.

Because of its unique capability to live on hard bottom substratum in South Carolina among its coastal regions and estuaries and of its abundance in those habitats, it can serve as an indicator species, epitomizing sessile fauna in coastal reefs that fall within the range of the colorful sea whip.
