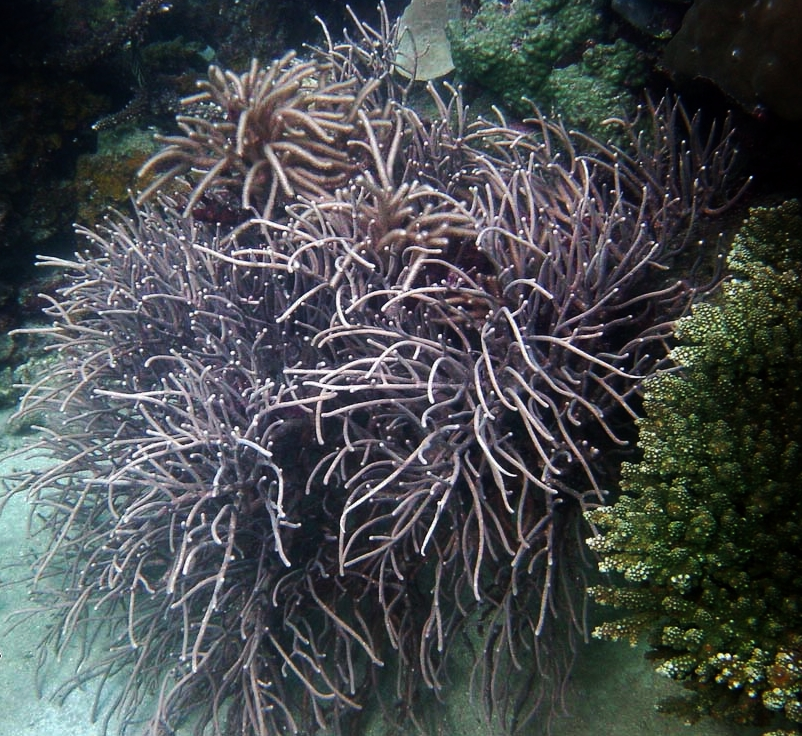
- Hicksonella, whip-coral

Scientific classification
- Domain: Eukaryota
- Kingdom: Animalia
- Phylum: Cnidaria
- Class: Octocorallia
- Order: Alcyonacea
- Family: Gorgoniidae
- Genus: Hicksonella; Nutting, 1910

= Hicksonella =

Genus of corals

Hicksonella is a genus of corals belonging to the family Gorgoniidae.

The species of this genus are found in Malesia and Northern Australia.

Species:

- Hicksonella expansa Alderslade, 1986
- Hicksonella guishanensis Zou & Chen, 1984
- Hicksonella princeps Nutting, 1910
