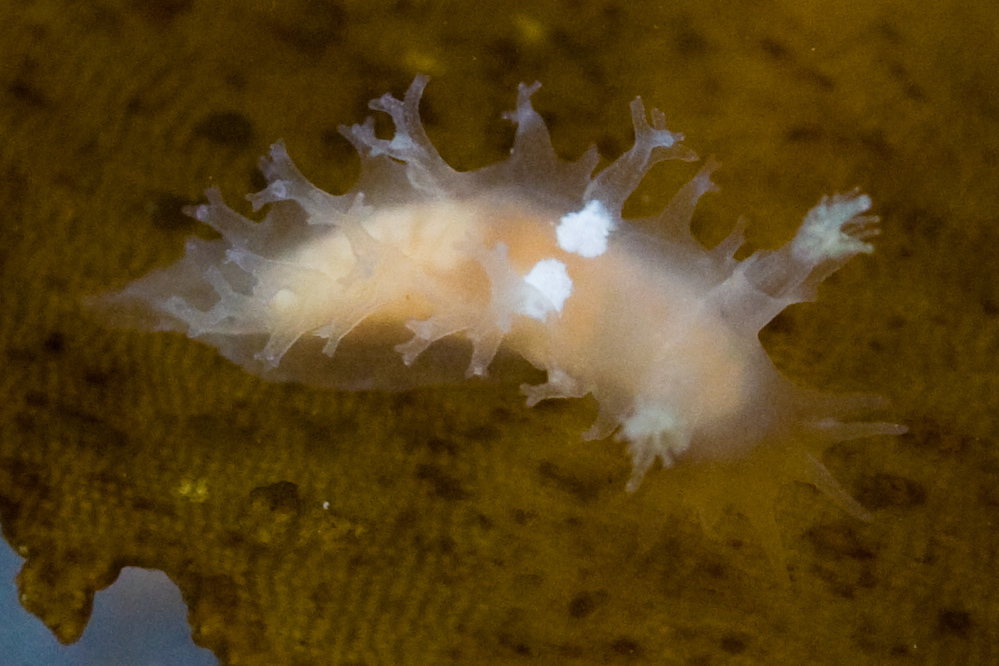

Scientific classification
- Kingdom: Animalia
- Phylum: Mollusca
- Class: Gastropoda
- Order: Nudibranchia
- Suborder: Tritoniacea
- Family: Tritoniidae
- Genus: Tritonicula
- Species: T. myrakeenae

Binomial name
- Tritonicula myrakeenae (Bertsch & Osuna, 1986)

= Tritonicula myrakeenae =

Species of gastropod

Tritonicula myrakeenae is a species of dendronotid nudibranch. It is a marine gastropod mollusc in the family Tritoniidae. A number of species of Tritonia were moved to a new genus Tritonicula in 2020 as a result of an integrative taxonomic study of the family Tritoniidae.

== Distribution ==
This species is reported from California, USA and Baja California, Mexico to Costa Rica. The type locality is Southeast end of Isla Cedros, Baja California, Mexico, rocky reef west of lighthouse, in Bahía Sudeste, 28°02′30″N 115°12′00″W.
