= Tritonicula =

Scientific classification
- Kingdom: Animalia
- Phylum: Mollusca
- Class: Gastropoda
- Order: Nudibranchia
- Suborder: Tritoniacea
- Family: Tritoniidae
- Genus: Tritonicula; Korshunova & Martynov, 2020

Species
- See text

Genus of molluscs

Tritonicula is a genus of sea slugs, nudibranchs, shell-less marine gastropod molluscs in the family Tritoniidae. It contains species previously included in Tritonia as a result of a revision of the family Tritoniidae.

== Species ==
Species within the genus Tritonicula include:

- Tritonicula bayeri (Ev. Marcus & Er. Marcus, 1967)
- Tritonicula hamnerorum (Gosliner & Ghiselin, 1987)
- Tritonicula myrakeenae (Bertsch & Osuna, 1986)
- Tritonicula pickensi (Ev. Marcus & Er. Marcus, 1967)
- Tritonicula wellsi (Er. Marcus, 1961)
