= Conopea =

Scientific classification
- Kingdom: Animalia
- Phylum: Arthropoda
- Class: Thecostraca
- Subclass: Cirripedia
- Order: Balanomorpha
- Family: Balanidae
- Subfamily: Archaeobalaninae
- Genus: Conopea; Say, 1822

Genus of barnacles

Conopea is a genus of barnacles, containing the following species:

- Conopea acuta (Nilsson-Cantell, 1921)
- Conopea basicuneata Van Syoc, Carrison-Stone, Madrona & Williams, 2014
- Conopea calceola (Ellis, 1758)
- Conopea cornuta (Hoek, 1913)
- Conopea cymbiformis (Darwin, 1854)
- Conopea exothobasis Van Syoc, Carrison-Stone, Madrona & Williams, 2014
- Conopea fidelis Carrison-Stone, Van Syoc, Williams & Simison, 2013
- Conopea galeata (Linnaeus, 1771) (seawhip barnacle)
- Conopea granulata (Hiro, 1937)
- Conopea investita (Hoek, 1913)
- Conopea margaretae Van Syoc, Carrison-Stone, Madrona & Williams, 2014
- Conopea minyrostrum Van Syoc, Carrison-Stone, Madrona & Williams, 2014
- Conopea mjobergi Broch, 1916
- Conopea propriens (Hoek, 1913)
- Conopea sabangensis Van Syoc, Carrison-Stone, Madrona & Williams, 2014
- Conopea saotomensis Carrison-Stone, Van Syoc, Williams & Simison, 2013
- Conopea scandens (Pilsbry, 1916)
- Conopea sinensis (Ren & Liu, 1978)
- Conopea titani Kolbasov, Chan, Molodtsova & Achituv, 2016
- Conopea willhearsti Van Syoc, Carrison-Stone, Madrona & Williams, 2014
- † Conopea bacata Carriol & Schneider, 2016
