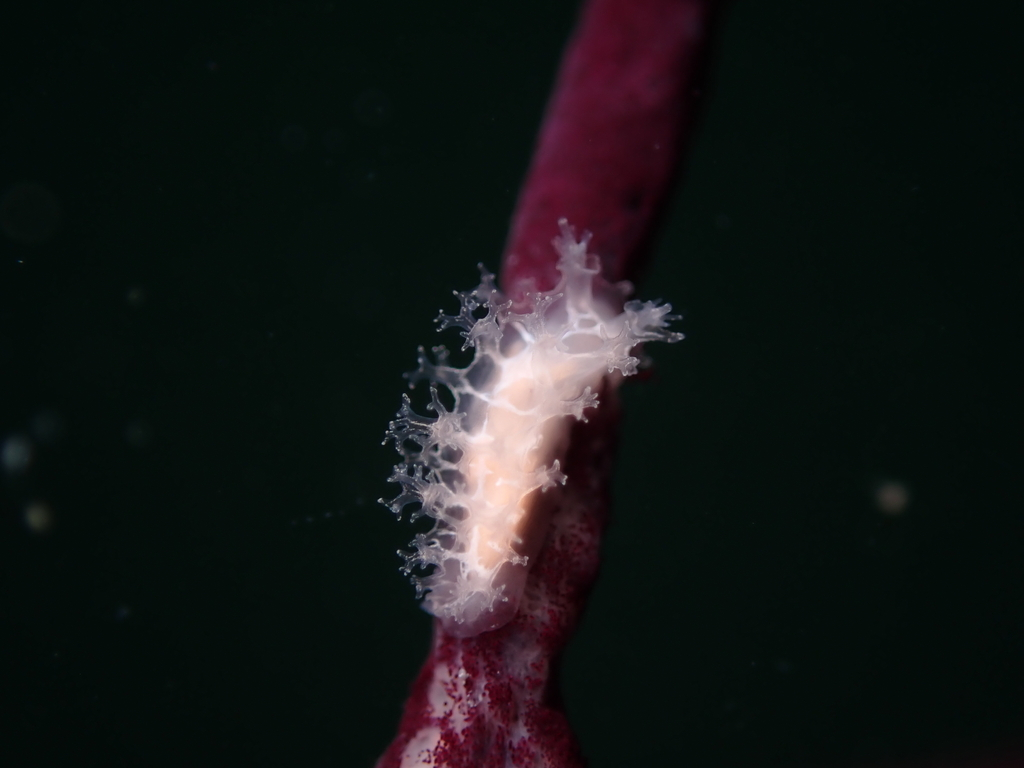

Scientific classification
- Kingdom: Animalia
- Phylum: Mollusca
- Class: Gastropoda
- Order: Nudibranchia
- Suborder: Tritoniacea
- Family: Tritoniidae
- Genus: Tritonicula
- Species: T. pickensi

Binomial name
- Tritonicula pickensi (Ev. Marcus & Er. Marcus, 1967)

= Tritonicula pickensi =

Species of gastropod

Tritonicula pickensi is a species of dendronotid nudibranch. It is a marine gastropod mollusc in the family Tritoniidae. A number of Caribbean and western Pacific species of Tritonia were moved to a new genus Tritonicula in 2020 as a result of an integrative taxonomic study of the family Tritoniidae.

== Distribution ==
This species was described from the Gulf of California. It was discovered at La Jolla Shores, Southern California in 1998.
