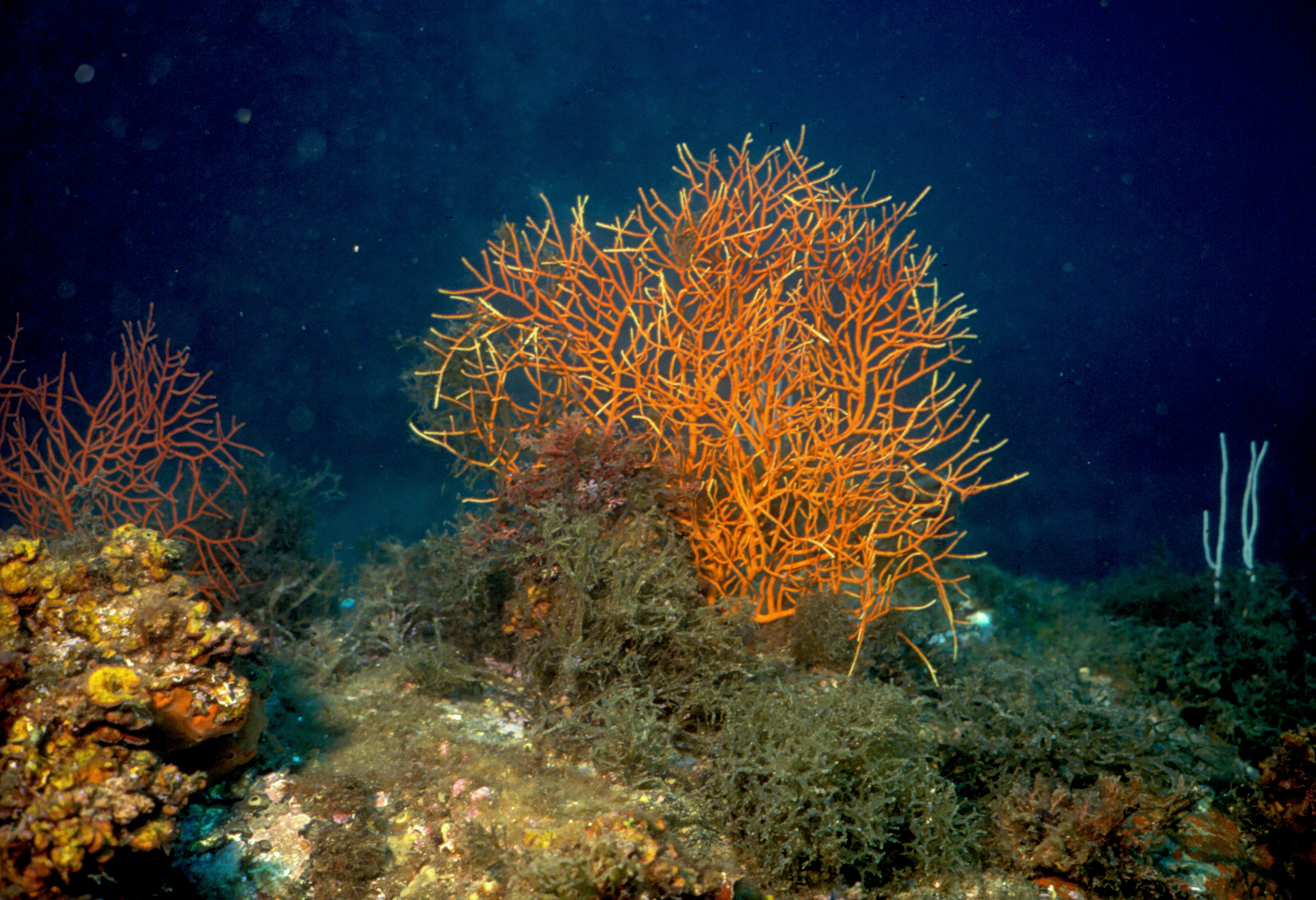
- Leptogorgia sarmentosa

Scientific classification
- Kingdom: Animalia
- Phylum: Cnidaria
- Subphylum: Anthozoa
- Class: Octocorallia
- Order: Malacalcyonacea
- Family: Gorgoniidae
- Genus: Leptogorgia; H. Milne-Edwards, 1857

Species
- See text

= Leptogorgia =

Genus of corals

Leptogorgia is a genus of soft coral in the family Gorgoniidae. The genus has a widespread distribution with members being found in the eastern Atlantic Ocean from Western Europe to South Africa, the Mediterranean Sea, the Atlantic coasts of North and South America, the Antilles and the Pacific coast of America. Species are found in both shallow and deep waters.

Leptogorgia is a slow growing sea whip and are easily damaged. They are easily damaged by storms and fishing agriculture.

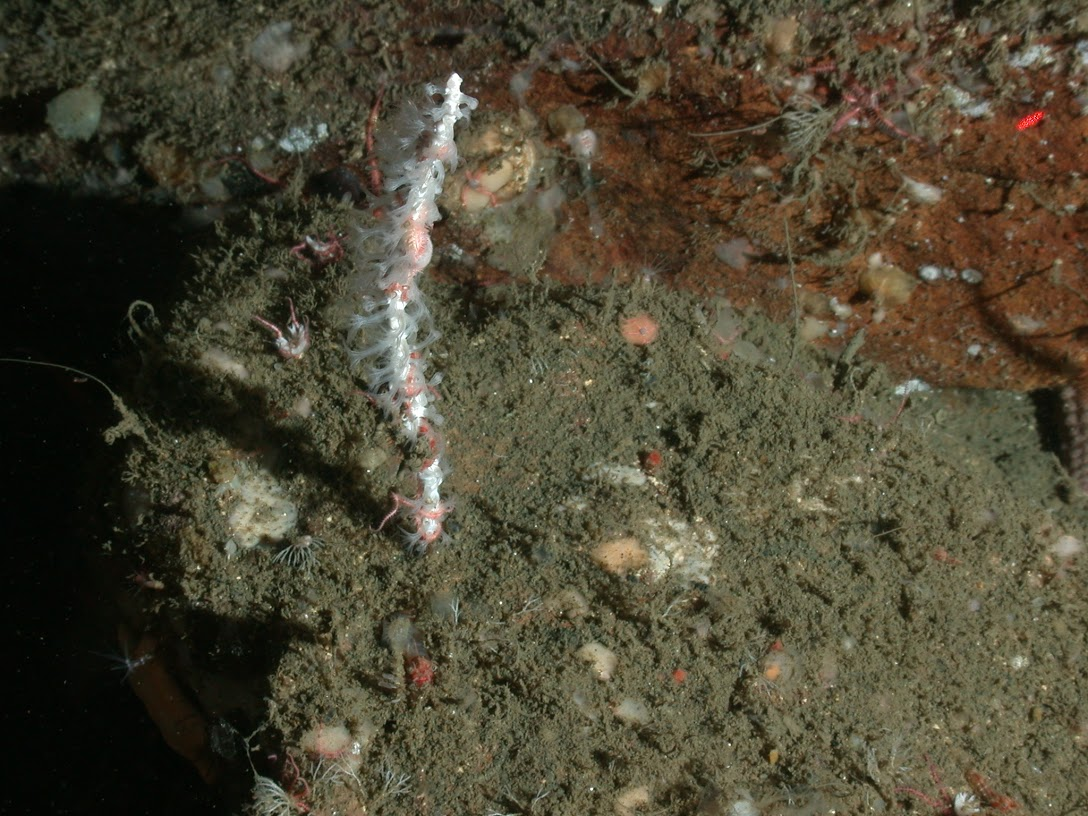
New species found off the coast of Northern California in 2014

An as yet unnamed species of Leptogorgia was discovered off the coast of Sonoma County, California in November 2014, near the Gulf of the Farallones and Cordell Bank National Marine Sanctuaries.

== Species ==
The World Register of Marine Species lists the following species:

- Leptogorgia abietina Kükenthal, 1919
- Leptogorgia acuta Bielschowsky, 1918
- Leptogorgia aequatorialis Bielschowsky, 1918
- Leptogorgia alba Duchassaing & Michelotti, 1864
- Leptogorgia albipunctata Stiasny, 1936
- Leptogorgia ampla (Verrill, 1864)
- Leptogorgia annobonensis Grasshoff, 1992
- Leptogorgia arbuscula (Philippi, 1866)
- Leptogorgia aureoflavescens Grasshoff, 1988
- Leptogorgia barbadensis (Bayer, 1961)
- Leptogorgia barnardi Stiasny, 1940
- Leptogorgia bayeri Williams & Lindo, 1997
- Leptogorgia cabofalsoi (Stiasny, 1939)
- Leptogorgia californica Verrill, 1868
- Leptogorgia capensis (Hickson, 1900)
- Leptogorgia capverdensis (Grasshoff, 1986)
- Leptogorgia cardinalis (Bayer, 1961)
- Leptogorgia cauliculus (Valenciennes, 1855)
- Leptogorgia chilensis Verrill, 1868
- Leptogorgia christiae Guzman & Breedy, 2008
- Leptogorgia clavata (Horn, 1860)
- Leptogorgia cofrini Breedy & Guzman, 2005
- Leptogorgia contorta Kükenthal, 1919
- Leptogorgia cortesi Breedy & Guzman, 2012
- Leptogorgia crista (Möbius, 1861)
- Leptogorgia cuspidata Verrill, 1865
- Leptogorgia dakarensis Stiasny, 1939
- Leptogorgia daniana (Verrill, 1868)
- Leptogorgia dichotoma Verrill, 1870
- Leptogorgia diffusa (Verrill, 1868)
- Leptogorgia dioxys Bielschowsky, 1918
- Leptogorgia divergens Studer, 1878
- Leptogorgia dubia Kükenthal, 1924
- Leptogorgia ena Breedy, Abeytia & Guzman, 2012
- Leptogorgia esperi Verrill, 1869
- Leptogorgia euryale (Bayer, 1952)
- Leptogorgia exigua Verrill, 1870
- Leptogorgia fasciculata Bielschowsky, 1918
- Leptogorgia festiva Duchassaing & Michelotti, 1860
- Leptogorgia filicrispa Horvath, 2011
- Leptogorgia flammea Ellis & (Solander, 1786)
- Leptogorgia flexilis Verrill, 1868
- Leptogorgia florae (Verrill, 1868)
- Leptogorgia floridana Verrill, 1869
- Leptogorgia fruticosa Hickson, 1928
- Leptogorgia fuscopunctata (Koch, 1886)
- Leptogorgia gaini (Stiasny, 1940)
- Leptogorgia gilchristi (Hickson, 1904)
- Leptogorgia gruveli (Stiasny, 1936)
- Leptogorgia hebes Verrill, 1869
- Leptogorgia ignita Breedy & Guzman, 2008
- Leptogorgia labiata Verrill, 1870
- Leptogorgia laxa hickson, 1928
- Leptogorgia longiramosa Kükenthal, 1924
- Leptogorgia lütkeni Wright & (Studer, 1889)
- Leptogorgia maghrebensis (Stiasny, 1936)
- Leptogorgia manabiensis Soler-Hurtado, Megina, Machordom & López-González, 2017
- Leptogorgia mariarosacea Del Mar Soler-Hurtado & López-González, 2012
- Leptogorgia medusa (Bayer, 1952)
- Leptogorgia miniata Milne Edwards & (Haime, 1857)
- Leptogorgia multifida (Verrill, 1870)
- Leptogorgia mutabilis (Breedy, Williams & Guzman, 2013)
- Leptogorgia nobilis (Verrill, 1868)
- Leptogorgia obscura Bielschowsky, 1918
- Leptogorgia occidafricana (Stiasny, 1936)
- Leptogorgia palma (Pallas, 1766)
- Leptogorgia panamensis Duchassaing & (Michelotti, 1860)
- Leptogorgia parva Bielschowsky, 1918
- Leptogorgia peruana Verrill, 1868
- Leptogorgia peruviana (Verrill, 1868)
- Leptogorgia piccola Grasshoff, 1988
- Leptogorgia pinnata (Linnaeus, 1758)
- Leptogorgia porosissima Milne Edwards, 1857
- Leptogorgia principensis Grasshoff, 1992
- Leptogorgia pseudogracilis Castro, Medeiros & Loiola, 2010
- Leptogorgia pulcherrima Bielschowsky, 1918
- Leptogorgia pumicea (Valenciennes, 1855)
- Leptogorgia pumila (Verrill, 1868)
- Leptogorgia puniacea Milne Edwards & (Haime, 1857)
- Leptogorgia purpurea (Pallas, 1767)
- Leptogorgia purpureomaculata Stiasny, 1936
- Leptogorgia purpureoviolacea (Stiasny, 1936)
- Leptogorgia pusilla Kükenthal, 1919
- Leptogorgia querciformis (Bielschowsky, 1918)
- Leptogorgia radula (Möbius, 1861)
- Leptogorgia ramulus (Valenciennes, 1855)
- Leptogorgia rathbunnii (Verrill, 1912)
- Leptogorgia regis Hickson, 1928
- Leptogorgia rigida Verrill, 1864
- Leptogorgia riodouri Stiasny, 1937
- Leptogorgia rosea (Lamarck, 1815)
- Leptogorgia ruberrima (Koch, 1886)
- Leptogorgia rubra Bielschowsky, 1918
- Leptogorgia rubroflavescens Stiasny, 1939
- Leptogorgia rubropurpurea (Pallas, 1766)
- Leptogorgia saharensis Stiasny, 1939
- Leptogorgia sanguinea (Lamarck, 1815)
- Leptogorgia sarmentosa (Esper, 1789)
- Leptogorgia senegalensis Stiasny, 1939
- Leptogorgia setacea (Pallas, 1766)
- Leptogorgia stheno (Bayer, 1952)
- Leptogorgia styx Bayer, 2000
- Leptogorgia sulfurea Bielschowsky, 1918
- Leptogorgia sylvanae Stiasny, 1940
- Leptogorgia taboguilla (Hickson, 1928)
- Leptogorgia tenuis Verrill, 1863
- Leptogorgia tenuissima Kükenthal, 1919
- Leptogorgia tricorata Breedy & Cortés, 2011
- Leptogorgia varians (Koch, 1886)
- Leptogorgia viminalis (Pallas, 1766)
- Leptogorgia violacea (Pallas, 1766)
- Leptogorgia violetta Grasshoff, 1988
- Leptogorgia virgea (Valenciennes, 1855)
- Leptogorgia virgulata (Lamarck, 1815)
- Leptogorgia webbiana (Valenciennes, 1855)
- Leptogorgia petechizans (Pallas, 1766) (nomen dubium)
