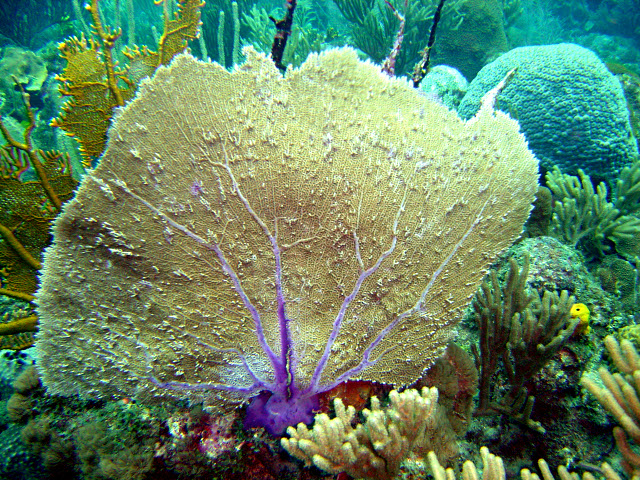
- Venus sea fan showing lateral branchlets

Conservation status
- Vulnerable (NatureServe)

Scientific classification
- Kingdom: Animalia
- Phylum: Cnidaria
- Subphylum: Anthozoa
- Class: Octocorallia
- Order: Malacalcyonacea
- Family: Gorgoniidae
- Genus: Gorgonia
- Species: G. flabellum

Binomial name
- Gorgonia flabellum Linnaeus, 1758

= Gorgonia flabellum =

Species of coral

Gorgonia flabellum, also known as the Venus fan, Venus sea fan, West Indian sea fan, purple gorgonian seafan, and common sea fan, is a species of sea fan, a sessile colonial soft coral.

== Description ==
The Venus sea fan is a delicate-looking colonial soft coral in the form of a fan composed of a lattice of branches in a single plane. The coral grows from a small base, forming several main branches with side branches and a network of small branchlets. The Venus sea fan is similar in appearance to Gorgonia ventalina, but has a slightly more untidy shape and short, stubby side growths coming out of the main plane. In G. flabellum, the branches are flattened at right angles to the plane of the fan, while in G. ventalina, the branches are either round or flattened parallel to the plane of the fan. The wide-mesh sea fan (Gorgonia mariae) is also similar in appearance, but at only 30 centimetres (11.8 in), is smaller, and many of the branchlets do not interconnect. The Venus sea fan is white, yellowish, or pale lavender. The fan is often found oriented perpendicular to the incoming waves and can grow to a height of 1.5 m (4 ft 11 in).

== Distribution and habitat ==
The Venus sea fan is very common in the Bahamas, and in this location is easily distinguishable from G. ventalina. In other parts of its range, Florida and the Lesser Antilles, however, the two species are more easily confused. It is a shallow-water species seldom exceeding a depth of 10 m (33 ft) and favours locations with strong wave action.

== Biology ==
The skeleton of the Venus sea fan is composed of calcite and a collagen-like substance. Embedded in this are the coral polyps, each of which is a filter feeder and extends its eight tentacles to catch plankton drifting past with the current. The tissues contain symbiotic dinoflagellate algae Symbiodinium spp. which are photosynthetic and use sunlight to create organic carbon compounds which are then available to the host coral.

The Venus sea fan is threatened by a variety of pathogens, including cyanobacteria and the fungal pathogen Aspergillus. Cyanobacterial overgrowth, particularly by filamentous Oscillatoriales, causes tissue necrosis and disrupts the sea fan's structure. Additionally, Aspergillus infections have been linked to large-scale tissue loss, especially in larger colonies and deeper waters.
