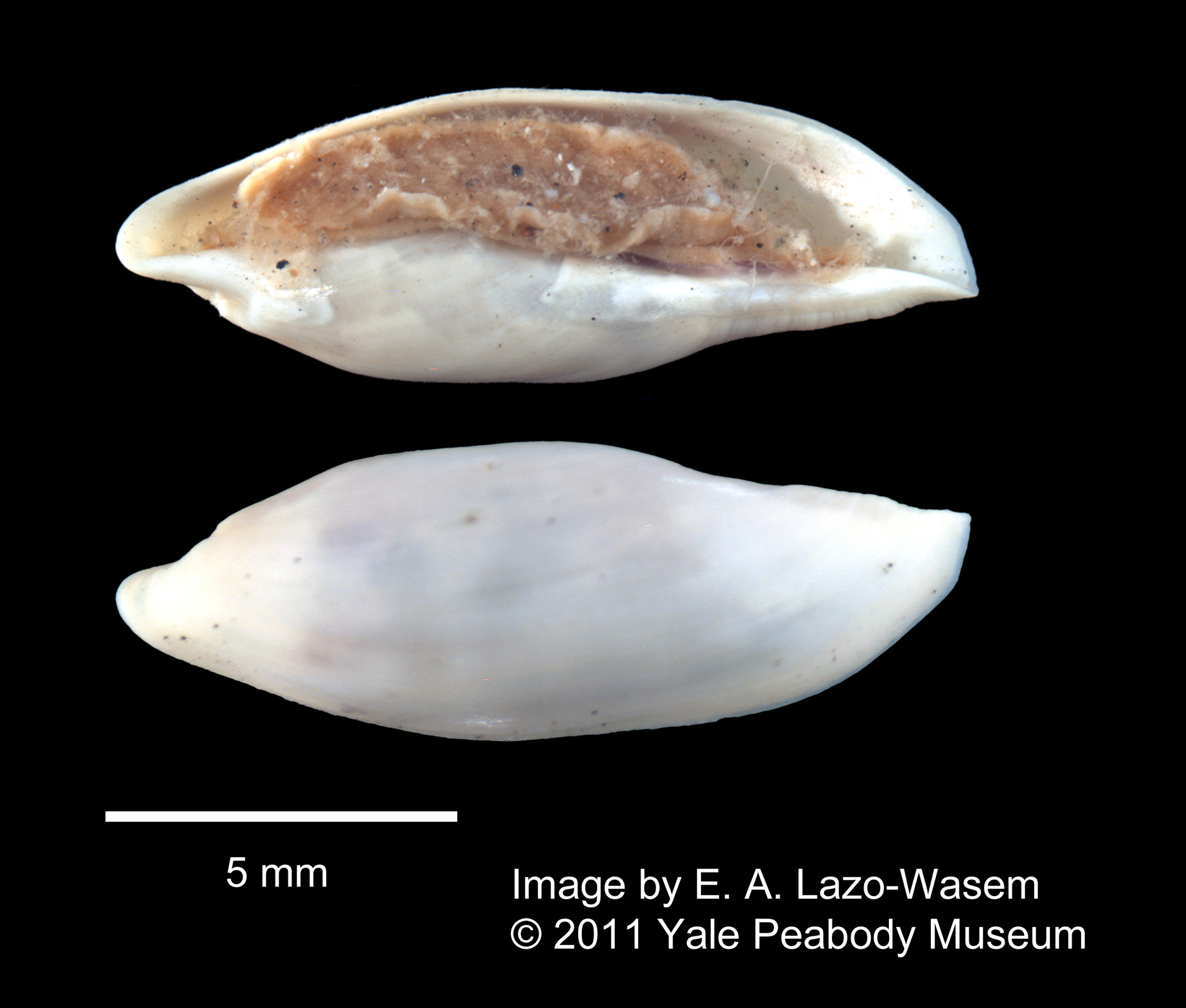

Scientific classification
- Kingdom: Animalia
- Phylum: Mollusca
- Class: Gastropoda
- Subclass: Caenogastropoda
- Order: Littorinimorpha
- Family: Ovulidae
- Genus: Simnialena
- Species: S. uniplicata

Binomial name
- Simnialena uniplicata (Sowerby II, 1849)

Synonyms
- Cyphoma uniplicata (G. B. Sowerby II, 1849); Neosimnia uniplicata (Sowerby II, 1849); Ovula antillarum Reeve, 1865; Ovula carolinensis Moerch, 1877; Ovulum subrostratum Sowerby II, 1948; Ovulum uniplicatum G. B. Sowerby II, 1849; Simnia uniplicata (G. B. Sowerby II, 1849); Simnialena marferula C. N. Cate, 1973

= Simnialena uniplicata =

Species of gastropod

Simnialena uniplicata, common name the one-tooth simnia, is a species of sea snail, a marine gastropod mollusk in the family Ovulidae, the ovulids, cowry allies or false cowries. It lives on the sea whip, Leptogorgia virgulata.

== Description ==
The shell of is shiny and smooth, and the shape of an elongated egg, with a flat base which shows a long, narrow, slit-like aperture. The shell grows to 2 cm long and the coil of the typical gastropod shell is not visible. The colour varies from ivory white to pink. The maximum recorded shell length is 21 mm.

== Distribution ==
Simnialena uniplicata occurs in shallow water on the eastern coast of the United States, Colombia, Jamaica and Brazil. Minimum recorded depth is 0 m. Maximum recorded depth is 116 m.

== Ecology ==
Simnialena uniplicata has a symbiotic relationship with the sea whip Leptogorgia virgulata on which it lives. The snail's white colour is derived from the pigments it absorbs and which it incorporates into its shell after eating debris from the coral.
