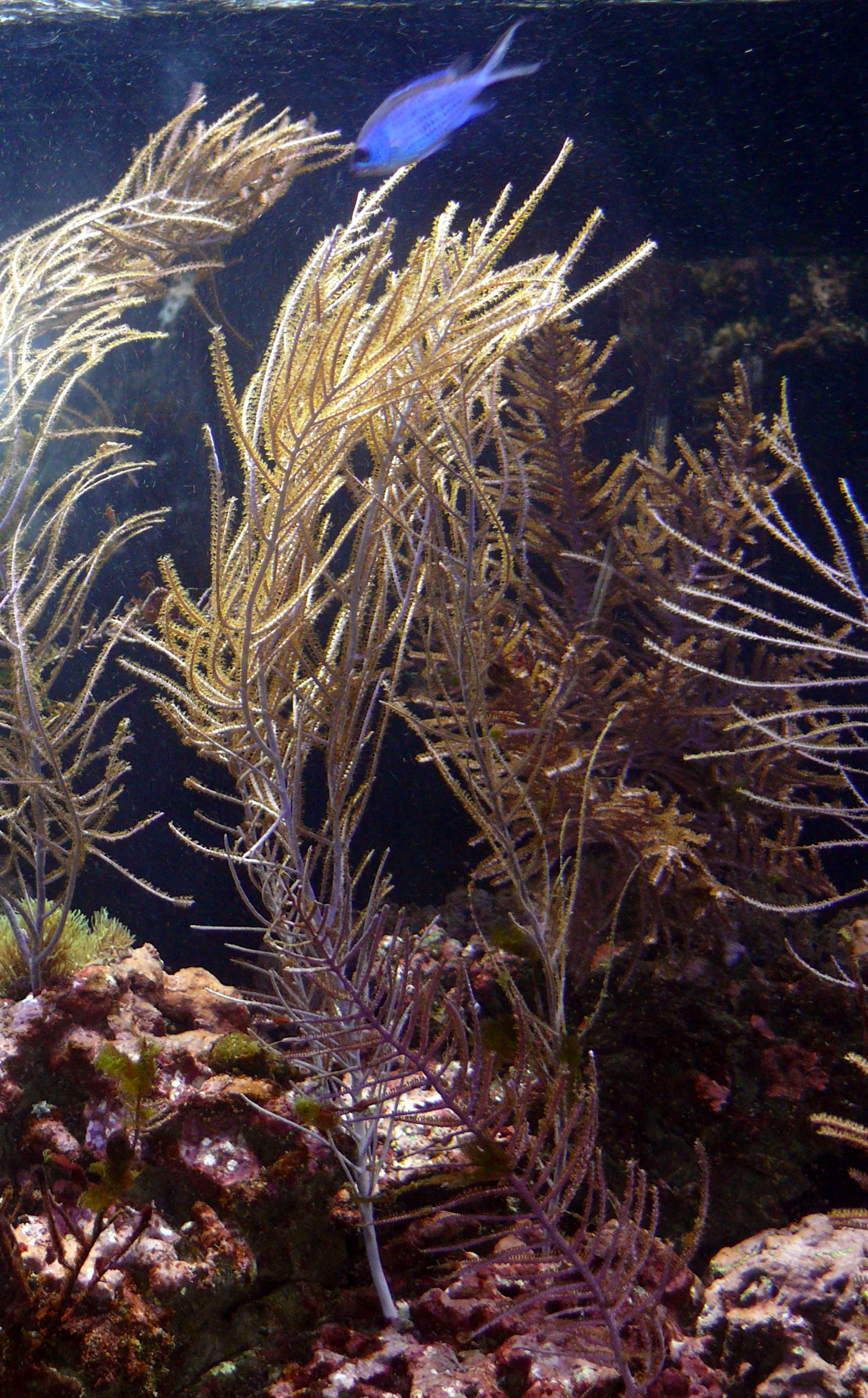
- Pseudopterogorgia acerosa

Scientific classification
- Kingdom: Animalia
- Phylum: Cnidaria
- Subphylum: Anthozoa
- Class: Octocorallia
- Order: Alcyonacea
- Family: Gorgoniidae
- Genus: Pseudopterogorgia; Kükenthal, 1919

Species
- Pseudopterogorgia australiensis; Pseudopterogorgia formosa; Pseudopterogorgia fredericki; Pseudopterogorgia luzonica; Pseudopterogorgia oppositipinna; Pseudopterogorgia pinnata; Pseudopterogorgia rubrotincta; Pseudopterogorgia thomassini; Pseudopterogorgia torresia

= Pseudopterogorgia =

Genus of corals

Pseudopterogorgia is a genus of soft coral sea fans in the family Gorgoniidae.
