= Tritonicula wellsi =

Scientific classification
- Kingdom: Animalia
- Phylum: Mollusca
- Class: Gastropoda
- Order: Nudibranchia
- Suborder: Tritoniacea
- Family: Tritoniidae
- Genus: Tritonicula
- Species: T. wellsi

Binomial name
- Tritonicula wellsi Er. Marcus, 1961

Species of mollusc

Tritonicula wellsi, the sea whip slug, is a species of nudibranch, a shell-less marine gastropod mollusc in the family Tritoniidae. The type locality is Beaufort, North Carolina. A number of Caribbean and western Pacific species of Tritonia were moved to a new genus Tritonicula in 2020 as a result of an integrative taxonomic study of the family Tritoniidae.

== Description ==
Tritonicula wellsi is white and grows to about 1.5 centimetres (0.6 in) long. The head bears a pair of rhinophores (sensory organs) each with a sheath at its base. There are also six tentacles on the head in a transverse line. The body has two longitudinal rows of arborescent (tree-like) gills which resemble the polyps of the whip corals on which it lives and feeds. It is adapted for life on the coral, Leptogorgia virgulata, and is found nowhere else. It closely resembles the related species, Tritonicula bayeri, which has much the same range.

== Distribution ==
Tritonicula wellsi is found wherever its host occurs, on the western fringes of the Atlantic Ocean, from North Carolina and Florida south to Belize, Honduras, Costa Rica, the Virgin Islands and Brazil.
