= Gorgonin =

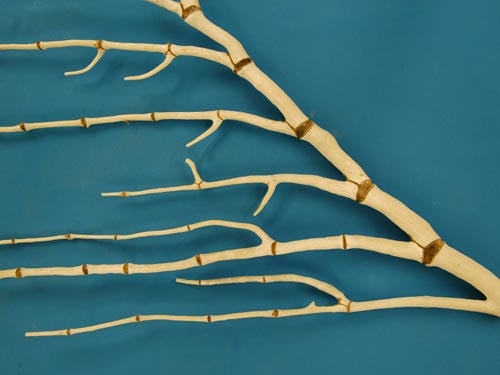
The skeleton of a bamboo coral; the darker joints are gorgonin nodes

Gorgonin is a flexible scleroprotein which provides structural strength to gorgonian corals, a subset of the order Alcyonacea. Gorgonian corals have supporting skeletal axes made of gorgonin and/or calcite. Gorgonin makes up the joints of bamboo corals in the deep sea, and forms the central internal skeleton of sea fans. It frequently contains appreciable quantities of bromine, iodine, and tyrosine.

Gorgonin is diagenetically stable and is deposited in discrete annual growth rings in Primnoa resedaeformis, and possibly other species.

== History ==
The study of the chemistry of gorgonin, as a substance rather than a protein, was started by Balard in 1825, who reported on the occurrence of "iodogorgic acid". Several sources cite Valenciennes as having given the protein the name of "gorgonin" in an 1855 monograph. However, the monograph cited appears to contradict this, solely naming a newly-discovered substance in Gorgonians "cornéine" after its resemblance to substances extracted from mammalian hooves and nails. According to one 1939 paper, Valenciennes' discovery was followed by investigations by Krukenberg, Mendel, Morner, and others, which suggested the protein was a keratin, similar to those obtained from the ectoderm of "higher animals".

== Scientific use ==
Research has shown that measurements of the gorgonin and calcite within species of gorgonian corals can be useful in paleoclimatology and paleoceanography. Studies of the growth, composition, and structure of the skeleton of certain species of gorgonians, (e.g., Primnoa resedaeformis, and Plexaurella dichotoma) can be highly correlated with seasonal and climatic variation.
