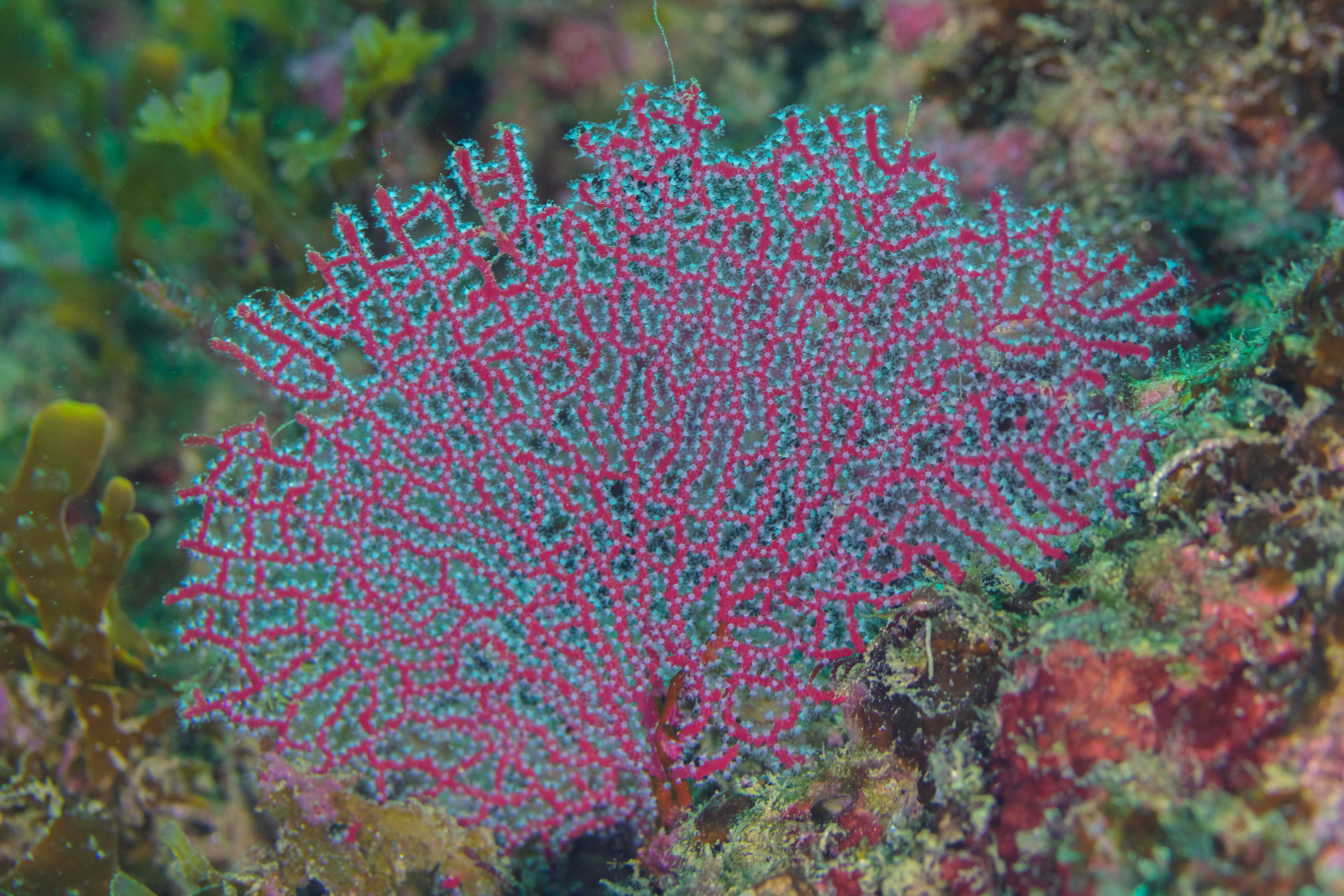
- Pacifigorgia sp.

Scientific classification
- Kingdom: Animalia
- Phylum: Cnidaria
- Subphylum: Anthozoa
- Class: Octocorallia
- Order: Malacalcyonacea
- Family: Gorgoniidae; Lamouroux, 1812

Genera
- See text

= Gorgoniidae =

Family of corals

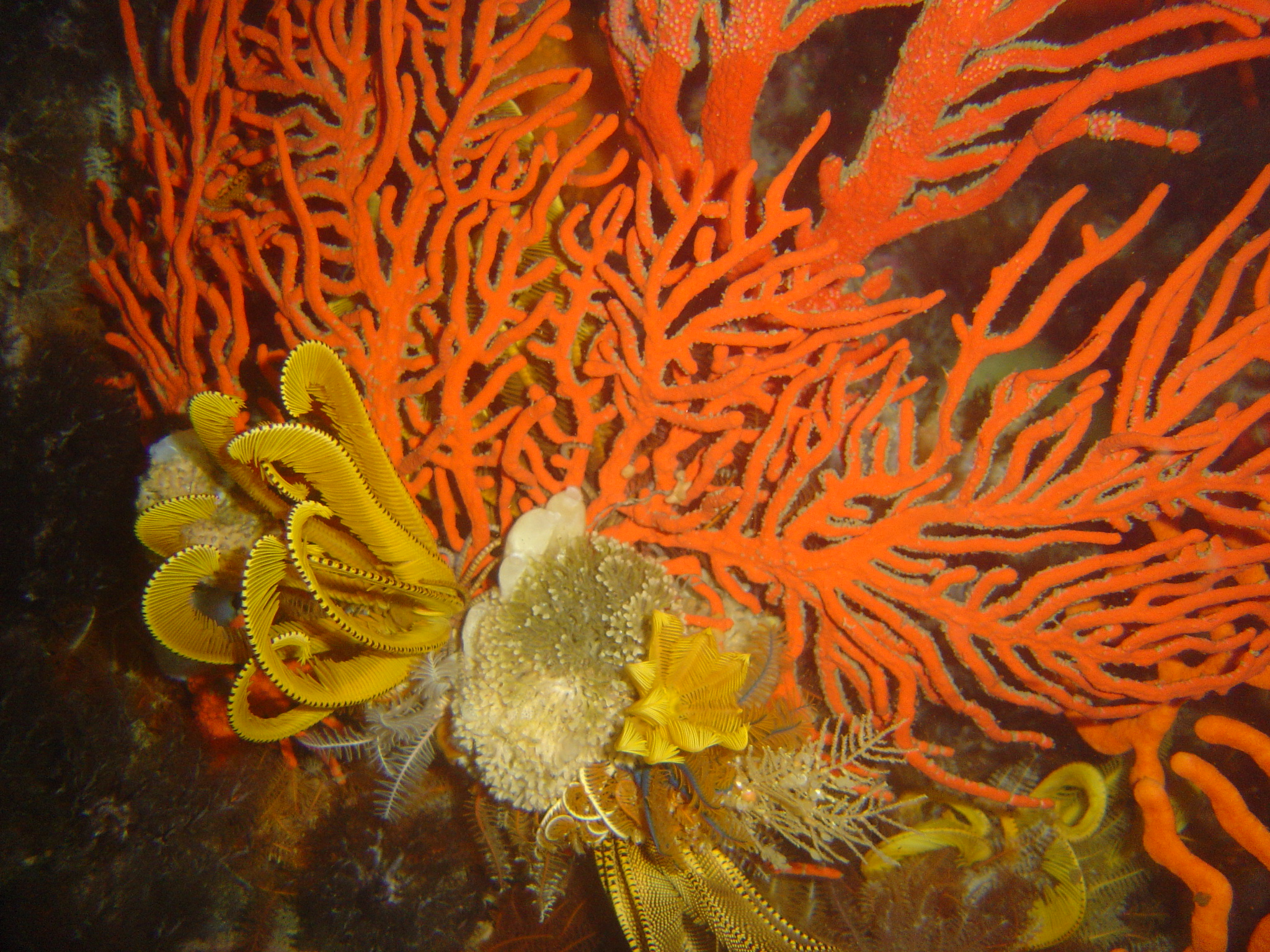
Leptogorgia palma

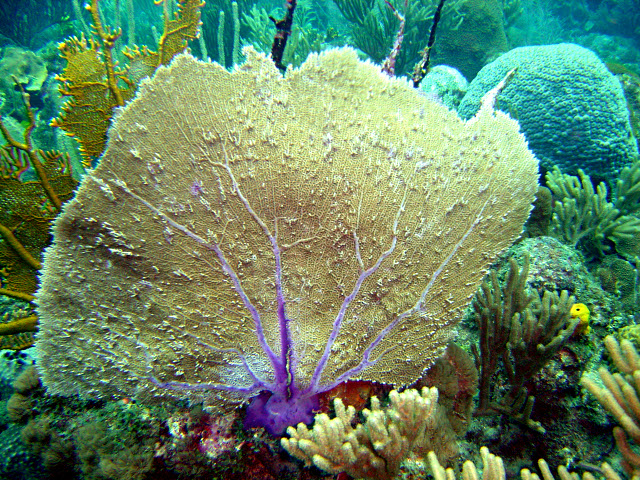
Gorgonia flabellum

Gorgoniidae is a family of soft corals in order Malacalcyonacea. Nearly all the genera and species are native to the east and west coasts of America.

== Characteristics ==
Originally the members of the family Gorgoniidae included a much wider range of genera than it does now and was used for all of the horny Octocorallia. Now it is restricted to those species where the "calcareous spicules are less than 0.3 mm. in length, sculptured with regularly disposed girdles of complicated tubercles ('warts'), the anthocodiae are relatively unarmed, at most with but a few characteristically shaped flat rods en chevron beneath each tentacle, the horny axial cylinder is weakly loculated if at all, and is perforated by a relatively narrow, chambered central chord, and in which the branchlets are usually quite slender, with a thin cortex."

The polyps are retractable and the stems have an axis of the protein gorgonin surrounding a narrow, hollow, cross-chambered central core. Molecular phylogenetic analyses undertaken suggest that the family is polyphyletic.

The main feature which separates the members of the different genera is the degree and type of spiculation. Other diagnostic features include the pattern of branching and the morphology of the whole colony. There is an increase in complexity from unbranched whip forms, open branched forms, reticulate forms and the leafy frond forms which include by Phyllogorgia and Phycogorgia.

Many species of gorgoniids are native to warm waters around the Atlantic and Pacific coasts of America. Some genera, including Lophogorgia, Leptogorgia and Eunicella, have a more widespread distribution including the temperate eastern Atlantic, the Mediterranean Sea. Certain species have strange canoe-shaped spicules and these are all found in the Caribbean Sea.

== Genera ==
The World Register of Marine Species list the following genera:

- Genus Adelogorgia Bayer, 1958
- Genus Antillogorgia Bayer, 1951
- Genus Callistephanus Wright & Studer, 1889
- Genus Chromoplexaura Williams, 2013
- Genus Eugorgia Verrill, 1868
- Genus Gorgonia Linnaeus, 1758
- Genus Leptogorgia Milne-Edwards, 1857
- Genus Olindagorgia Bayer, 1981
- Genus Pacifigorgia Bayer, 1951
- Genus Phycogorgia Milne Edwards & Haime, 1850
- Genus Phyllogorgia Milne Edwards & Haime, 1850
- Genus Psammogorgia Verrill, 1868
- Genus Pseudopterogorgia Kükenthal, 1919

The following genera were previously place in Gorgoniidae:

- Genus Eunicella Verrill, 1869 (now in family Eunicellidae)
- Genus Filigorgia Stiasny, 1937 (now in family Pterogorgiidae)
- Genus Guaiagorgia Grasshoff & Alderslade, 1997 (now in family Acanthogorgiidae}
- Genus Hicksonella Nutting, 1910 (now in family Isididae)
- Genus Pinnigorgia Grasshoff & Alderslade, 1997 (now in family Pterogorgiidae)
- Genus Pterogorgia Ehrenberg, 1834 (now in family Pterogorgiidae)
- Genus Rumphella Bayer, 1955 (now in family Isididae)
- Genus Tobagogorgia Sanchez, 2007 (now in family Pterogorgiidae)
