= Christmas tree coral =

Christmas tree coral may refer to:

- Antipathes dendrochristos, a species of black coral
- Studeriotes longiramosa, a species of soft coral
