= Antipathes caribbeana =

Scientific classification
- Kingdom: Animalia
- Phylum: Cnidaria
- Subphylum: Anthozoa
- Class: Hexacorallia
- Order: Antipatharia
- Family: Antipathidae
- Genus: Antipathes
- Species: A. caribbeana

Binomial name
- Antipathes caribbeana Opresko, 1996

Species of coral

Antipathes caribbeana, commonly known as kings coral, is a species of black coral in the family Antipathidae, native to the western Atlantic Ocean and Caribbean Sea. It is a tree-like coral that forms large bushy colonies typically found on deep reef slopes. The species was first described in 1996 by the American marine biologist Dennis Opresko. Like other black corals, A. caribbeana has a dark, horn-like skeleton made of a protein-chitin material rather than calcium carbonate. This coral is an important component of mesophotic coral ecosystems and has been subject to harvesting for the precious coral trade, prompting conservation concerns.

== Description ==
Antipathes caribbeana forms large, arborescent colonies with a bushy, irregularly branched morphology. Colonies commonly reach over 1 m in height and may branch to the tenth order or more. The branching pattern is dense and tree-like: branches arise in an upward and outward direction from the main stem, often projecting horizontally from steep surfaces.

The skeleton of A. caribbeana is composed of a matrix of chitinous fibrils and protein which creates the hard, black organic material characteristic of antipatharian corals. Covering the surface of the skeleton are numerous small spines that give black corals their rough texture. In A. caribbeana, the skeletal spines are conical to subcylindrical in shape and are laterally compressed.

The living colonies of A. caribbeana are brownish to tan in color, with the polyps bearing translucent tentacles. The polyps are relatively small, about 1.0 mm in diameter across the tentacles, and have an elongate, rectangular shape when expanded. Polyps are spaced approximately 0.3–0.5 mm apart along the branches. When the coral is alive and the polyps are extended, the colonies have a fuzzy appearance due to the crown of tiny tentacles on each polyp. If disturbed, the polyps can contract their tentacles. However, they generally do not fully retract into calyces as stony corals do.

Antipathes caribbeana is distinguished from similar species of black coral by its combination of colony size, branching pattern, and spine morphology. It resembles the Caribbean species Antipathes salix in having irregular bushy branching, but A. caribbeana has shorter and stouter spines with more numerous surface tubercles than A. salix.

== Distribution ==
Antipathes caribbeana is distributed in the tropical western Atlantic, specifically throughout the Caribbean Sea and adjacent waters. It has been recorded from the coasts and offshore reefs of numerous locations in this region. The known range extends from Colombia and Panama in the southwestern Caribbean northwards and eastwards through Central America and the Greater and Lesser Antilles up to the Bahamas.

This black coral inhabits mesophotic reef environments, typically at depths ranging from about 30 m to 60 m. It is most abundant on deep fore-reef slopes and vertical walls at these depths. However, A. caribbeana can occasionally be found in somewhat shallower waters and deeper extremes. In Panama, colonies have been observed as shallow as 11 m depth, likely in areas of reduced light such as under ledges. Conversely, in locations like The Bahamas, it has been found at depths greater than 100 m. The optimal habitat appears to be the dimly lit, current-swept zone of the outer reef—deep enough to avoid intense sunlight and competition from stony corals, but shallow enough to receive sufficient planktonic food supply.

== Conservation ==
Like other black corals worldwide, A. caribbeana has faced pressures from harvest and habitat disturbance. This species has a rigid, dark skeleton that is sought after for use in jewelry and crafts, as part of the precious coral trade. Along with the Caribbean black coral Plumapathes pennacea, A. caribbeana is one of the two principal species targeted by the black coral jewelry industry in the Western Atlantic. Intensive harvesting, especially in the mid-20th century, led to localized population declines.

Off the island of Cozumel, black coral extraction began in the early 1960s and has been largely focused on A. caribbeana and P. pennacea. This harvest significantly reduced their numbers. In response to concerns about overexploitation, the Mexican government ceased granting harvest permits around Cozumel by 1995 and later restricted black coral collection to certain mainland areas under regulation. Conservation surveys in Cozumel between 1998 and 2016 found that colonies of A. caribbeana remained present in low numbers, with no significant change in density or size distribution, suggesting a stable but still diminished population. This indicates that cessation of harvesting may have helped prevent further declines, though recovery to former abundance was not evident over that period.

Recognizing the vulnerability of black corals, international measures have been put in place to regulate their trade. All species of black coral (order Antipatharia), including A. caribbeana, were listed under Appendix II of the Convention on International Trade in Endangered Species of Wild Fauna and Flora (CITES) in 1981. This listing means that export of black coral material requires permits and scientific evidence that such trade is not detrimental to the species' survival. Despite this, enforcement of regulations has been inconsistent in some regions, and illegal or unreported harvesting has been noted as a concern in the past.

As of currently available assessments, Antipathes caribbeana has not been evaluated for the IUCN Red List and does not have a formal conservation status under that system.
