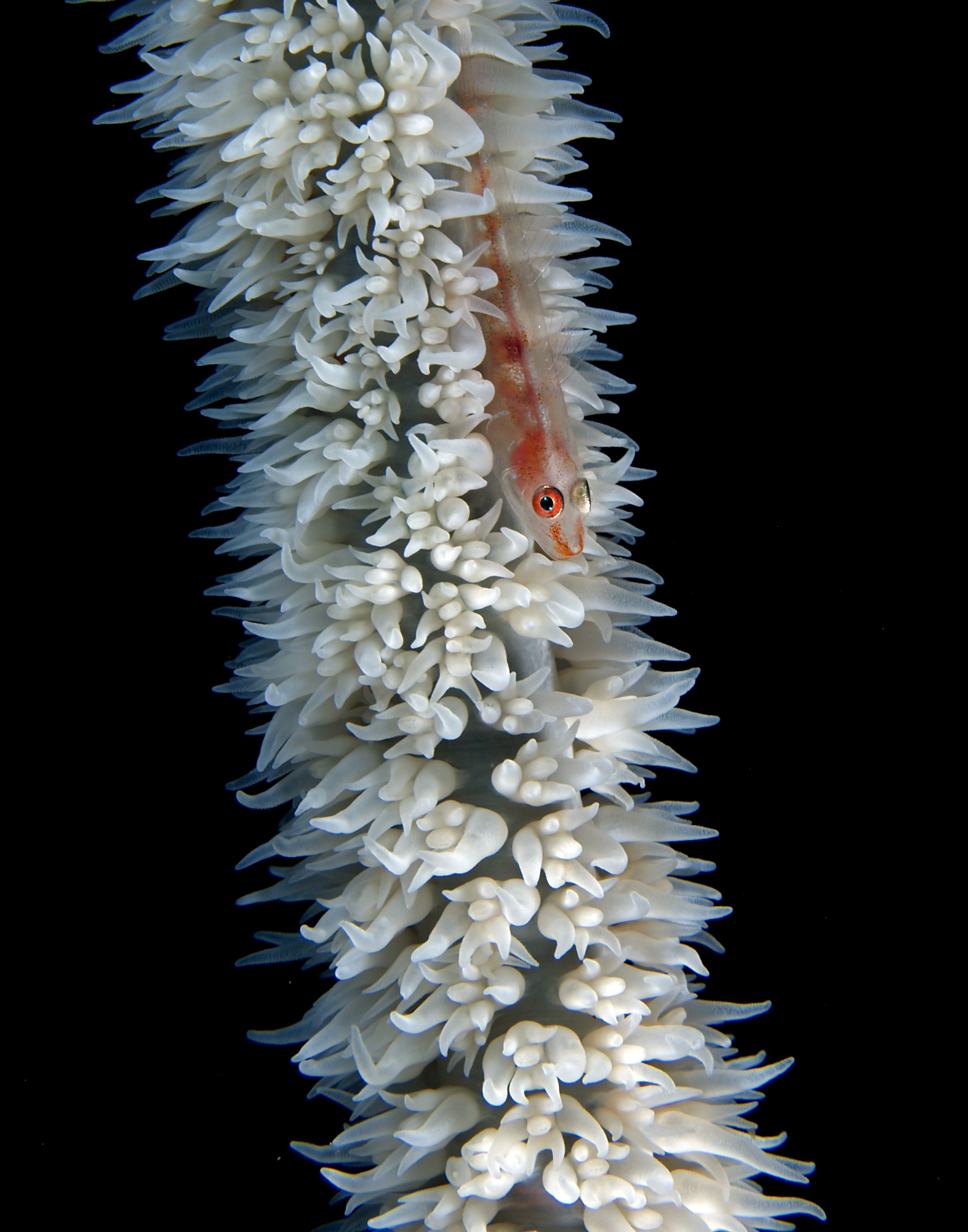

Conservation status
- Least Concern (IUCN 3.1)

Scientific classification
- Kingdom: Animalia
- Phylum: Chordata
- Class: Actinopterygii
- Division: Teleostei
- Order: Gobiiformes
- Family: Gobiidae
- Genus: Bryaninops
- Species: B. yongei

Binomial name
- Bryaninops yongei (Davis & Cohen, 1969)

Synonyms
- Cottogobius yongei W. P. Davis & Cohen, 1969; Tenacigobius yongei (W. P. Davis & Cohen, 1969)

= Bryaninops yongei =

Species of fish

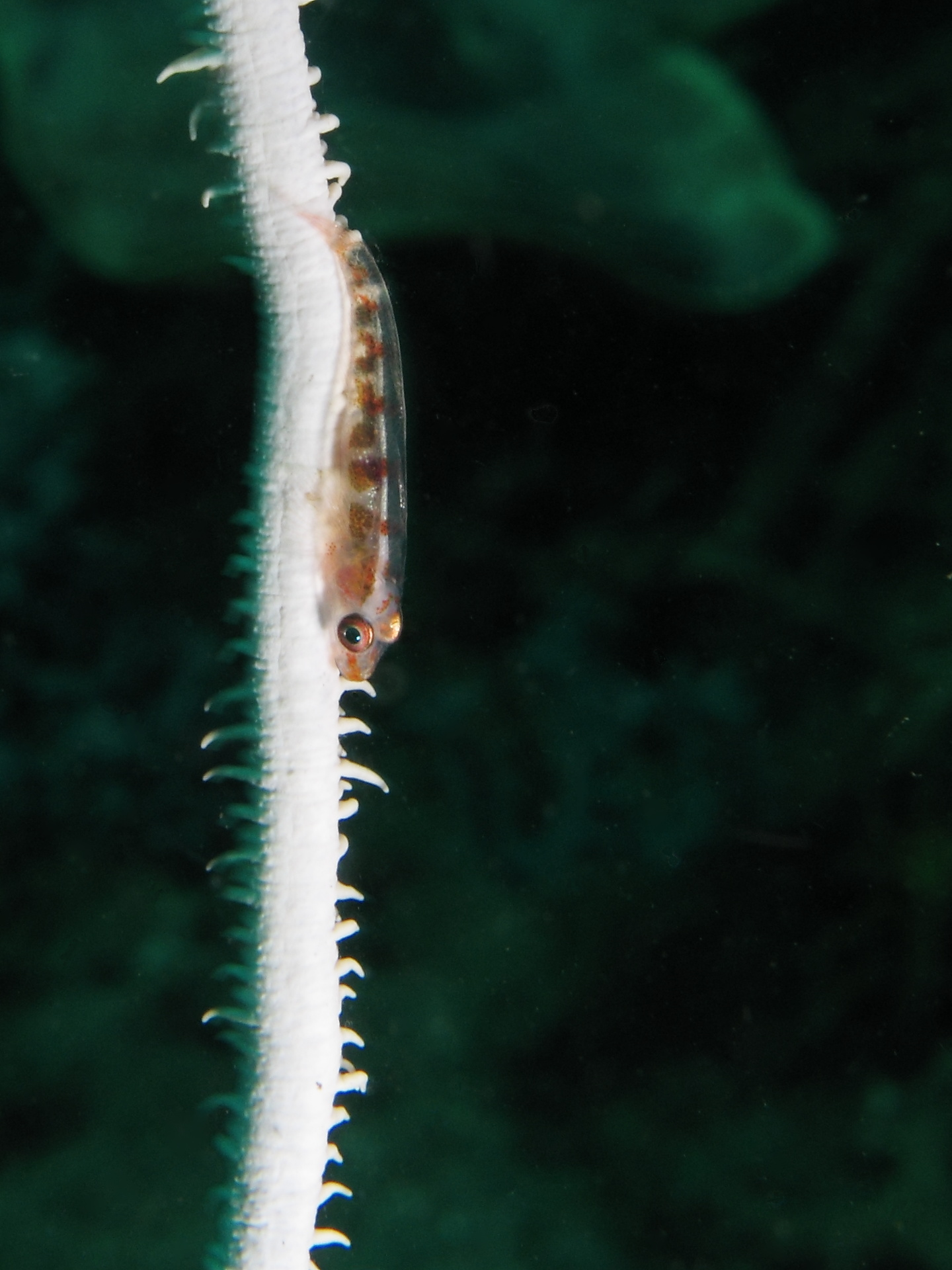
B. yongei at Sumbawa, Indonesia

Bryaninops yongei, the wire-coral goby or whip coral goby, is a benthic species of goby widely distributed from the tropical and subtropical waters of the Indian Ocean (including the Red Sea) to the islands in the center of the Pacific Ocean.

== Description ==
The whip coral goby has a semi-transparent head and body, with white scales running along its vertebra. Its head is reddish-brown to violet in color and the goby has pink to violet-red eyes. Their coloration is noted to match the color of the coral they inhabit. The fish is approximately 3 to 3.5 centimeters long. Healthy whip coral gobies have seven dorsal spines, seven dorsal soft rays, one anal spine and seven anal soft rays. They also have cup-like pelvic fins and gills that open below the base of the pectoral fins.

== Taxonomy and naming ==
The whip coral goby is a member of the genus Bryaninops, the family Gobiidae and the order Perciformes. It was discovered in the late 1960's.

== Habitat ==
There are noted populations of the whip coral goby around areas such as the Marshall Islands, Chagos Archipelago and Samoa. The whip coral goby lives in and around coral species such as stinging coral. Whip coral gobies usually live in pairs in association with the wire coral species Cirrhipathes anguina (Antipathidae) at depths of between 3 and 45 metres (9.8 and 147.6 ft). These pairs are usually male-female pairs. This species is also found in the aquarium trade.

== Behavior ==
=== Reproduction ===
Whip coral gobies reproduce through benthic spawning, meaning they release eggs and sperm to be fertilized externally. They also have the ability to change their sex when there is a gender imbalance.

=== Relation with coral ===
Gobies such as the whip coral goby respond to chemical signals released from the coral reefs they inhabit. The gobies will eliminate algae toxic to coral from their environment and will also clean mucus build-ups off of coral.

=== Defensive behaviour ===
The whip coral goby lacks the ability to cause harm to predators. As such, the whip coral goby is not a threat to human safety. However, white coral gobies have the ability to quickly propel themselves through water to escape from predators. This defensive mechanism makes it difficult for researchers to study the fish in its natural habitat.
