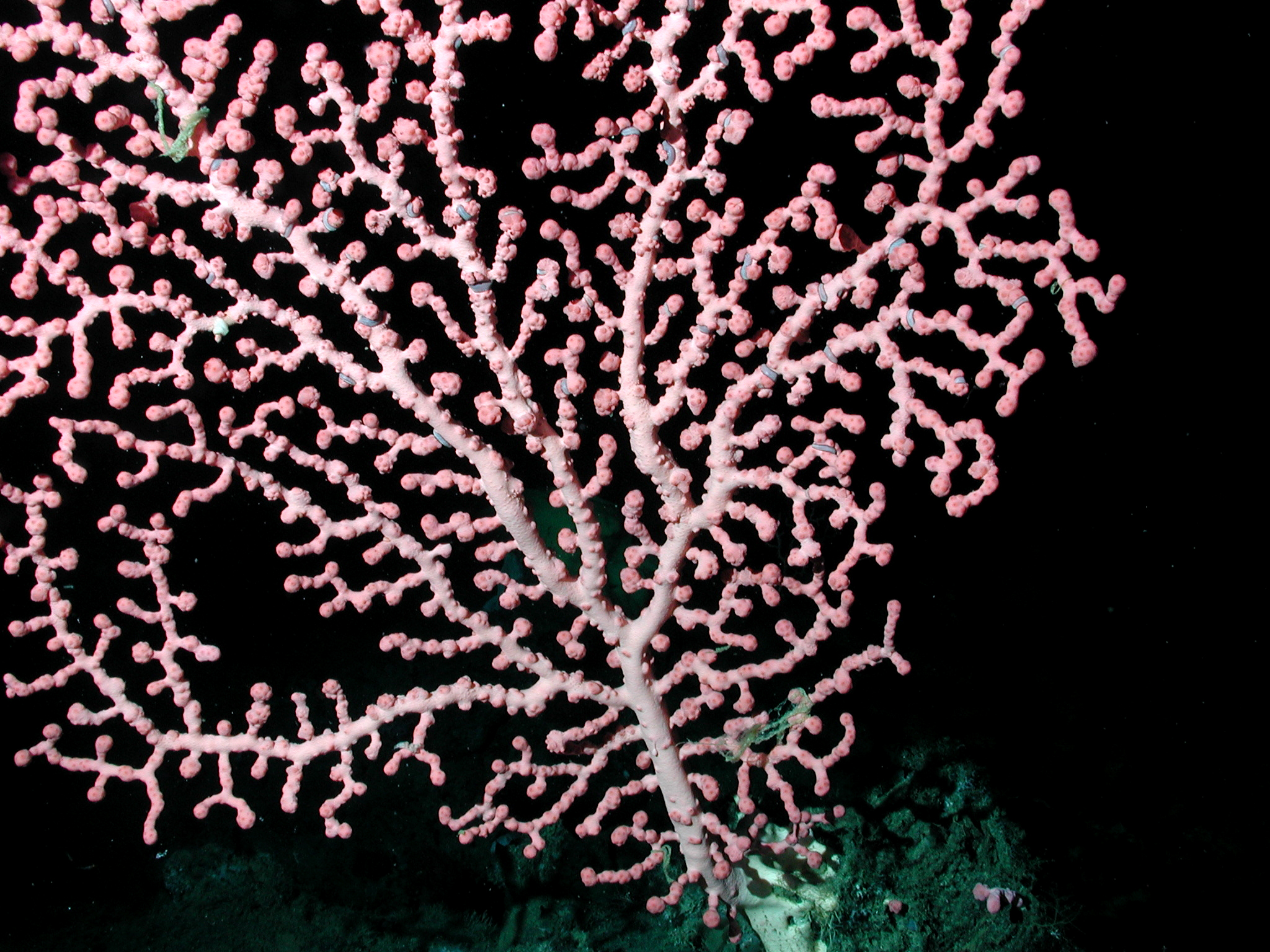
- Paragorgia arborea

Conservation status
- Near Threatened (IUCN 3.1)

- Declining (NZ TCS)

Scientific classification
- Kingdom: Animalia
- Phylum: Cnidaria
- Subphylum: Anthozoa
- Class: Octocorallia
- Order: Scleralcyonacea
- Family: Coralliidae
- Genus: Paragorgia
- Species: P. arborea

Binomial name
- Paragorgia arborea (Linnaeus, 1758)

Synonyms
- Paragorgia nodosa Koren & Danielssen, 1883; Paragorgia pacifica Verrill, 1922

= Paragorgia arborea =

Species of coral

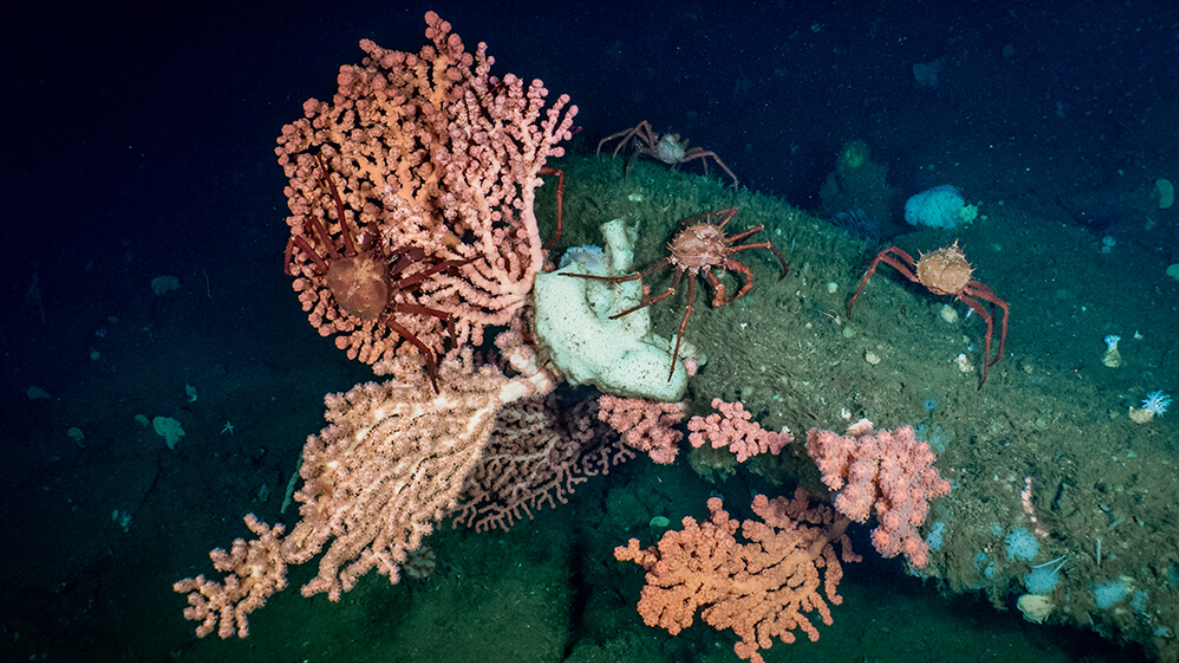
P. arborea on Santa Lucia Bank in the Chumash Heritage National Marine Sanctuary. Source: NOAA

Paragorgia arborea is a species of coral in the family Coralliidae, commonly known as the tree bubblegum coral. It mainly grows in depths between 200 and 1,300 metres (700 and 4,300 ft) at temperatures between 3 and 8 °C (37 and 46 °F). It is found widespread in the Northern Atlantic Ocean and Northern Pacific Ocean on seamounts and knolls, and was first described by the Swedish naturalist Carl Linnaeus in 1758. P. arborea is a foundation species, providing a habitat for other species in deep sea coral ecosystems.

== Description ==
Paragorgia arborea can grow to heights of 6 metres (20 ft), and are brightly colored white, red, or salmon, in a branching, fan-shaped structure with a tough central trunk and many branches. The branch tips are bulbous, giving this octocoral its common name of bubblegum coral. It has both specialized feeding polyps, autozoids, and specialized reproductive polyps, siphonozoids. Little is known about the growth rate and life span of P. arborea, but it has been found to have an average growth rate of 1 cm/yr, with growth rates of 2-6 cm/yr found in some cases, and is long-lived on the scale of decades.

=== Reproductive strategy ===
Like other deep-water corals, little is known about the specific reproductive ecology of P. arborea. It is hypothesized that P. arborea is a brooder—fertilization takes place on or inside the female colony. Corals reproduce sexually by either spawning or brooding, but then once settled, corals reproduce asexually to grow into a many branched colony.

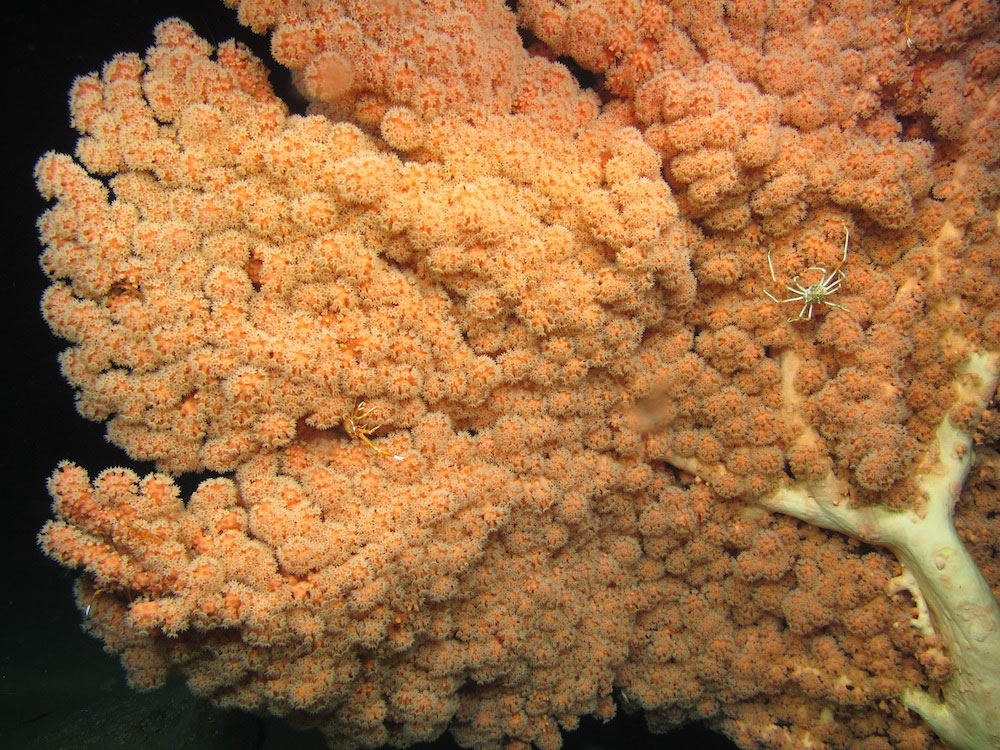
P. arborea with polyps extended to feed. Source: NOAA

=== Feeding strategy ===
P. arborea is a filter feeder; it eats organic matter suspended in the current it lives in. It optimizes nutrient uptake by adjusting its behavior to the tidal cycle. When the tidal currents are coming in, coral polyps extend to actively feed on the organic matter being brought in with the tide. After the tide has gone out and the currents aren't bringing in as much organic matter, the coral polyps retract to digest the food or be inactive. Furthermore, P. arborea is often found growing in a concave shape facing into the current, which is a growth strategy thought to allow the coral to receive food more effectively.

=== Microbiome ===
Because it is difficult to access deep sea corals for study, relatively little is known about the microbiome of P. arborea. It has been found to have a host-specific microbiome and an external surface mucopolysaccharide layer (SML), which is a mucus that acts as a defense against water-borne pathogens and helps the coral filter feed. Alphaproteobacteria, Mycoplasmatota, and Spirochaetota are the main taxonomic groups of bacteria found in the P. arborea microbiome.

== Distribution and habitat ==
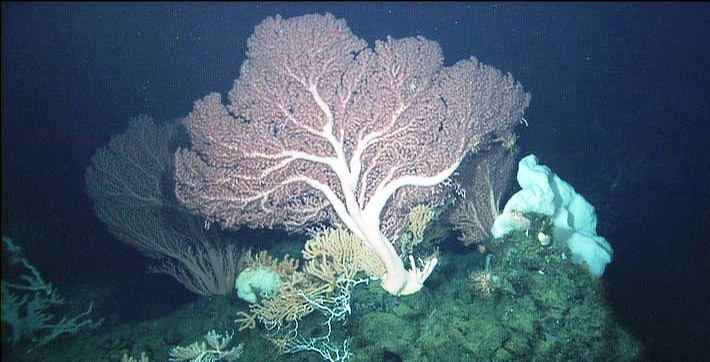
P. arborea on the Davidson Seamount. Source: NOAA/MBARI

Paragorgia arborea is found between 30° and 70° latitude in both hemispheres. It is well established in the North Atlantic Ocean where it generally grows at depths between 200 and 1,300 metres (700 and 4,300 ft) and at temperatures between 3 and 8 °C (37 and 46 °F). It occurs along the entire Norwegian coast, and at depths of 40 metres (130 ft) in Norwegian fjords, especially those with poor visibility and abundant planktonic life. In the Western Atlantic, it occurs in Nova Scotia waters including Oceanographer Canyon, off Georges Bank, the Grand Banks, Davis Strait, and southern Greenland. It is also found near the Mid-Atlantic Ridge south of Iceland.

P. arborea often grows on reefs created by the stony coral Lophelia pertusa. Like other gorgonians, it prefers exposed locations with strong currents. Thus, is most commonly found in marine canyons and on the continental slope, where the slope is steep. P. arborea prefers to grow on top of hard substrate that is a mixture of pebbles, boulders, and cobbles.

== Ecology ==
Paragorgia arborea is often associated with the Gorgon's Head basket star Gorgonocephalus caputmedusae, which uses it as a perch on which to catch plankton drifting past. It sometimes forms dense coral gardens with other octocorals, such as Primnoa resedaeformis, Paramuricea grandis and Keratoisis ornata and the sea pen Pennatula borealis. It is a foundation species, serving as a breeding ground, shelter, and feeding space for a wide variety species and increasing the species richness of the entire ecosystem.

== Conservation threats ==
Paragorgia arborea and other deep sea corals face a variety of anthropogenic threats to their conservation. Human activities that disturb the ocean bottom, including trawling by commercial fisheries, offshore oil extraction, deep sea mining, and cable laying, are the most prominent threats. Since P. arborea has a slow growth rate (~1 cm/yr) and a fragile skeleton, it is particularly vulnerable to these threats. Destruction of P. arborea due to human disturbance will have effects that reverberate throughout multiple trophic levels in the deep-sea coral ecosystem and affect species richness because it is a foundation species. Ecological niche modeling under a worst-case climate change scenario predicts a high decline rate in the availability of suitable habitat for P. arborea, as well as no predicted refugia.
