= Corallium occultum =

Scientific classification
- Domain: Eukaryota
- Kingdom: Animalia
- Phylum: Cnidaria
- Class: Octocorallia
- Order: Alcyonacea
- Family: Coralliidae
- Genus: Corallium
- Species: C. occultum

Binomial name
- Corallium occultum Tzu-Hsuan Tu et al., 2015

Synonyms
- Corallium illiandinnum

Species of coral

Corallium occultum, formerly Corallium illiandinnum, is a species of coral in the family Coralliidae.
