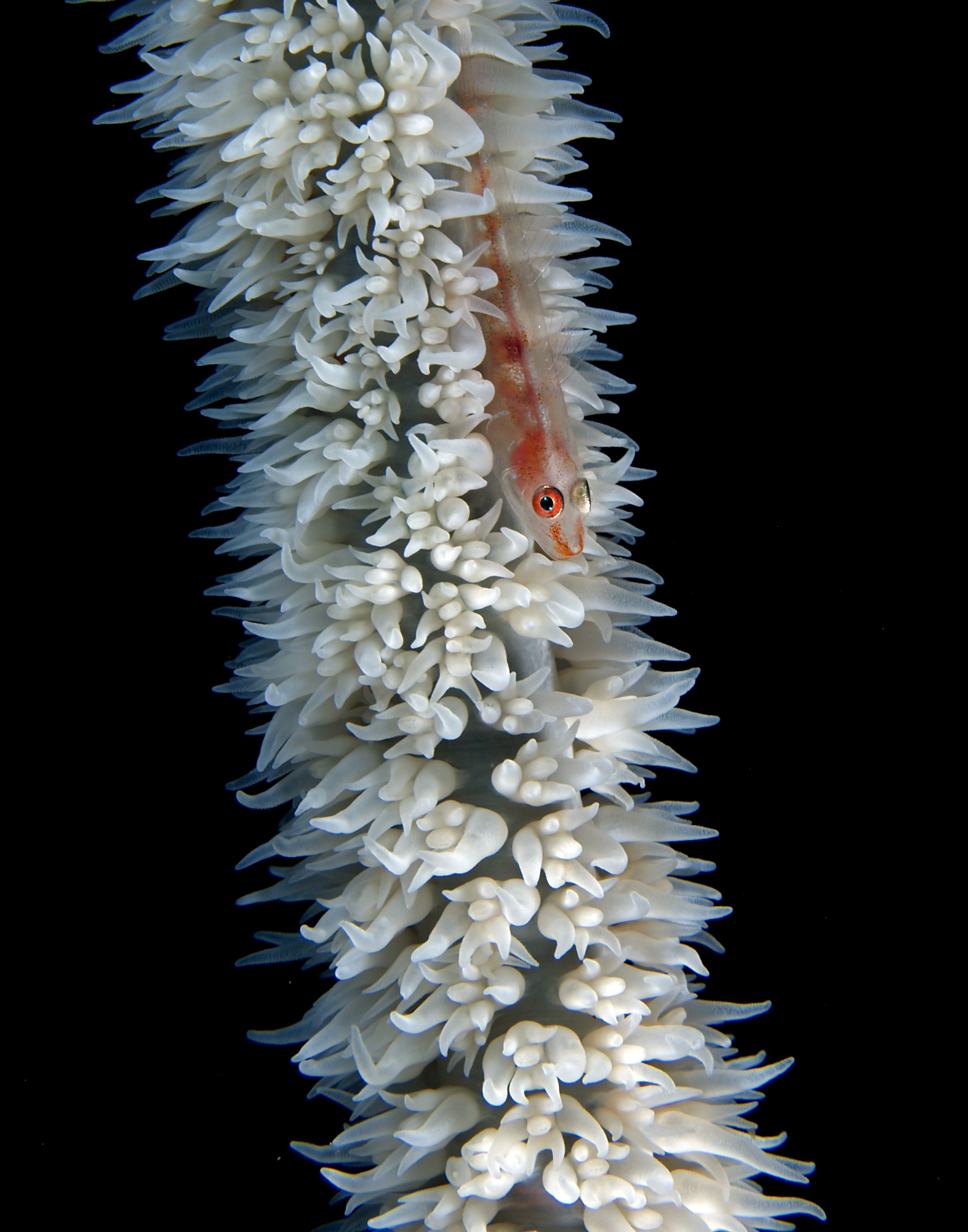
- Whip coral dwarf goby, (B. yongei) on a whip coral (Cirrhipathes)

Scientific classification
- Kingdom: Animalia
- Phylum: Chordata
- Class: Actinopterygii
- Division: Teleostei
- Order: Gobiiformes
- Family: Gobiidae
- Subfamily: Gobiinae
- Genus: Bryaninops; J. L. B. Smith, 1959

Type species
- Bryaninops ridens J. L. B. Smith, 1959

Synonyms
- Tenacigobius Larson & Hoese, 1980

= Bryaninops =

Genus of fishes

Bryaninops (commonly known as sea whip gobies) is a tropical Indo-Pacific genus of gobies. The genus takes its common name from the fact that it is commensal on gorgonians (commonly known as sea whips) and black coral. The genus is further characterised by cryptic colouration.

== Species ==
There are currently 16 recognized species in this genus:

- Bryaninops amplus Larson, 1985 (Large whip goby)
- Bryaninops annella T. Suzuki & J. E. Randall, 2014
- Bryaninops dianneae Larson, 1985
- Bryaninops discus T. Suzuki, Bogorodsky & J. E. Randall, 2012
- Bryaninops earlei T. Suzuki & J. E. Randall, 2014
- Bryaninops erythrops D. S. Jordan & Seale, 1906 (Erythrops goby)
- Bryaninops isis Larson, 1985 (Isis goby)
- Bryaninops loki Larson, 1985 (Loki whip-goby)
- Bryaninops natans Larson, 1985 (Redeye goby)
- Bryaninops nexus Larson, 1987 (Upside-down goby)
- Bryaninops ridens J. L. B. Smith, 1959 (Ridens goby)
- Bryaninops spongicolus T. Suzuki, Bogorodsky & J. E. Randall, 2012
- Bryaninops tectus T. Suzuki & J. E. Randall, 2014
- Bryaninops tigris Larson, 1985 (Black coral goby)
- Bryaninops translucens T. Suzuki & J. E. Randall, 2014
- Bryaninops yongei W. P. Davis & Cohen, 1969 (Whip coral goby)
