= Antipathes griggi =

Scientific classification
- Kingdom: Animalia
- Phylum: Cnidaria
- Subphylum: Anthozoa
- Class: Hexacorallia
- Order: Antipatharia
- Family: Antipathidae
- Genus: Antipathes
- Species: A. griggi

Binomial name
- Antipathes griggi Opresko, 2009

Species of coral

Antipathes griggi is a species of colonial coral in the order Antipatharia, the black corals, so named because their calcareous skeletons are black.

== Distribution ==
Antipathes griggi is found primarily in the Hawaiian Islands.

== Taxonomy ==
Antipathes griggi was formerly identified as Antipathes dichotoma, but Opresko (2003) restricted the latter species to the Mediterranean and judged the Hawaiian material to be distinct. The Hawaiian species was finally named A. griggi by Opresko (2009).
