= Antipathes grandis =

Scientific classification
- Kingdom: Animalia
- Phylum: Cnidaria
- Subphylum: Anthozoa
- Class: Hexacorallia
- Order: Antipatharia
- Family: Antipathidae
- Genus: Antipathes
- Species: A. grandis

Binomial name
- Antipathes grandis Verrill, 1928

Species of coral

Antipathes grandis, commonly called the grand black coral, is a species of black coral in the family Antipathidae. The grand black coral is endemic to the Hawaiian Islands.
