= Allopathes =

Scientific classification
- Domain: Eukaryota
- Kingdom: Animalia
- Phylum: Cnidaria
- Class: Hexacorallia
- Order: Antipatharia
- Family: Antipathidae
- Genus: Allopathes; Opresko & Cairns, 1994

Species
- Allopathes denhartogi; Allopathes desbonni; Allopathes robillardi

Genus of corals

Allopathes is a genus of corals in the family Antipathidae. It is characterized by several long stems protruding from a short, thick base with spines arranged vertically around the stem. Its polyps are arranged in a single row that run the length of the coral. This genus was initially a subgenus of Cirrhipathes and Stichopathes, although it also displayed similarities to Antipathes verticillata. However, the presence of branched growth forms excludes it from Stichopathes or Cirrhipathes and the unique morphology of its spines meant that it could not be included in Allopathes. Because they seemed to have a combination of characteristics of different genera, the two species in question, Allopathes desbonni and Allopathes robillardi were given their own genus.

The name comes from the Greek "allos-", meaning "other" and "-pathes", referring to its taxonomic relationship to other genera in Antipathidae.
