= Allopathes desbonni =

Scientific classification
- Kingdom: Animalia
- Phylum: Cnidaria
- Subphylum: Anthozoa
- Class: Hexacorallia
- Order: Antipatharia
- Family: Antipathidae
- Genus: Allopathes
- Species: A. desbonni

Binomial name
- Allopathes desbonni (Duchassaing & Michelotti, 1864)

Synonyms
- Antipathes desbonni (Duchassaing & Michelotti, 1864); Cirrhipathes desbonni Duchassaing & Michelotti, 1864; Cirripathes desbonni Duchassaing & Michelotti, 1864

Species of coral

Allopathes desbonni is a species of coral in the family Antipathidae. It was described by Édouard Placide Duchassaing de Fontbressin and Giovanni Michelotti in 1864. The species is known from the Gulf of Mexico and from near the Lesser Antilles (West Central Atlantic Ocean).
