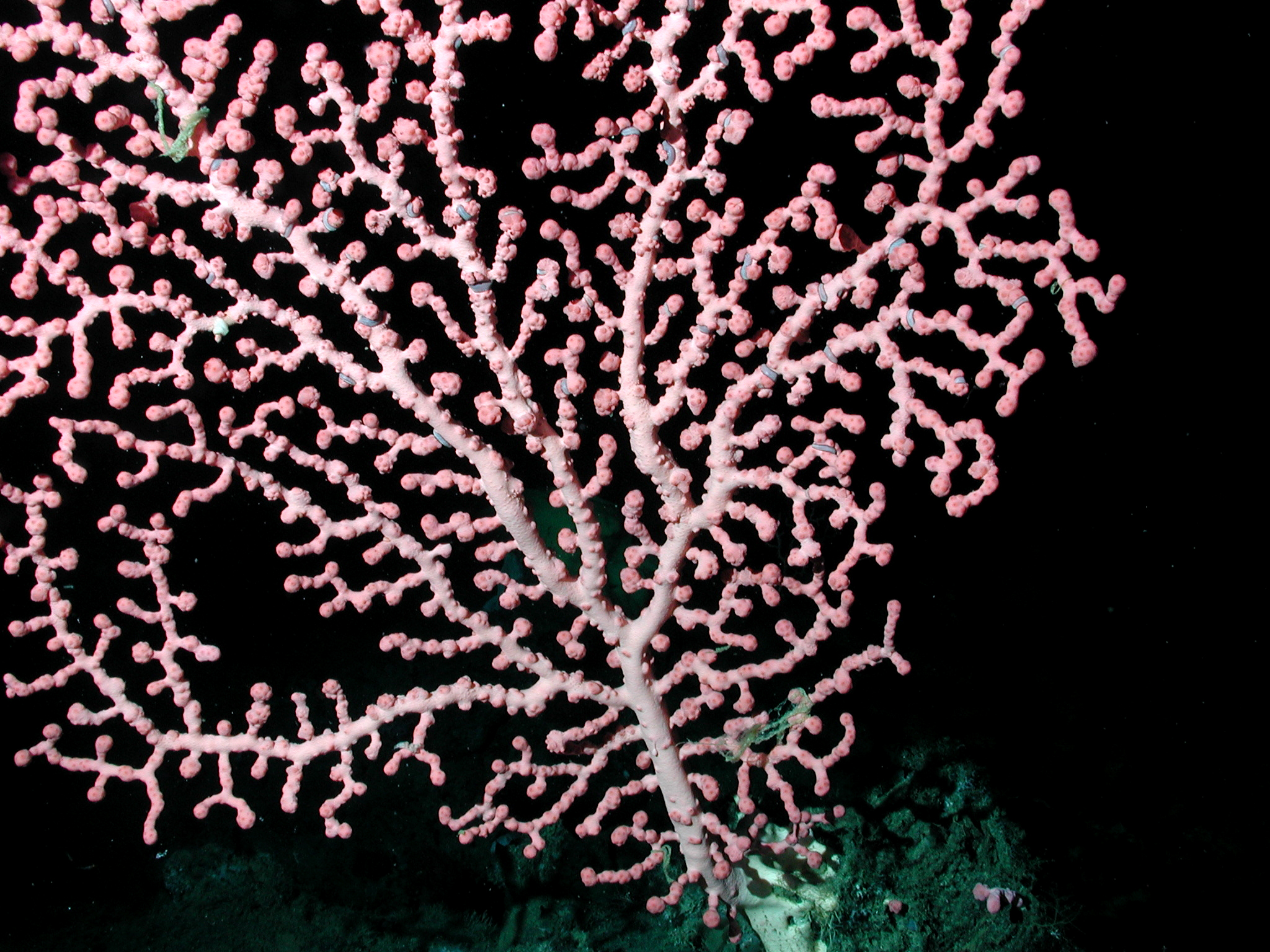
- Paragorgia arborea

Scientific classification
- Kingdom: Animalia
- Phylum: Cnidaria
- Subphylum: Anthozoa
- Class: Octocorallia
- Order: Scleralcyonacea
- Family: Coralliidae
- Genus: Paragorgia; Milne Edwards, 1857

= Paragorgia =

Genus of corals

Paragorgia is a genus of soft coral in the family Coralliidae. It was formerly place in the family Paragorgiidae.

== Species ==
The following species are recognized:

- Paragorgia alisonae Sánchez, 2005
- Paragorgia aotearoa Sánchez, 2005
- Paragorgia arborea (Linnaeus, 1758)
- Paragorgia coralloides Bayer, 1993
- Paragorgia jamesi Herrara & Shank, 2016
- Paragorgia johnsoni Gray, 1862
- Paragorgia kaupeka Sánchez, 2005
- Paragorgia maunga Sánchez, 2005
- Paragorgia papillata Li, Zhan & Xu, 2021
- Paragorgia regalis Nutting, 1912
- Paragorgia rubra Li, Zhan & Xu, 2017
- Paragorgia sibogae Bayer, 1993
- Paragorgia splendens Thomson & Henderson, 1906
- Paragorgia stephencairnsi Sánchez, 2005
- Paragorgia tapachtli Sánchez, 2005
- Paragorgia wahine Sánchez, 2005
- Paragorgia whero Sánchez, 2005
- Paragorgia yutlinux Sánchez, 2005
