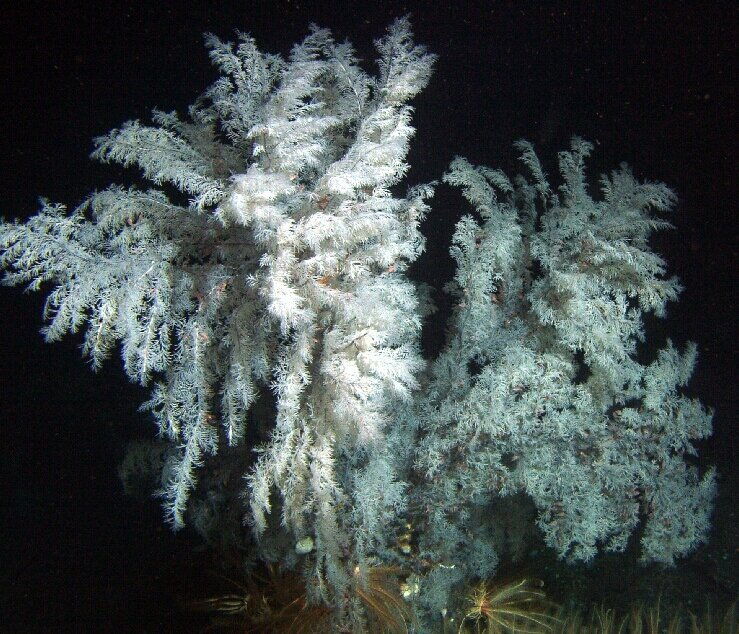
- Growing off the coast of California

Scientific classification
- Kingdom: Animalia
- Phylum: Cnidaria
- Subphylum: Anthozoa
- Class: Hexacorallia
- Order: Antipatharia
- Family: Antipathidae
- Genus: Antipathes
- Species: A. dendrochristos

Binomial name
- Antipathes dendrochristos Opresko, 2005

= Antipathes dendrochristos =

Species of coral

Antipathes dendochristos, commonly known as Christmas tree coral, is a species of colonial order in the order Antipatharia, the black corals, so named because their calcareous skeletons are black. A. dendochristos was first identified in 2005 off the coast of Southern California after sampling using the submersible Delta, allowed for the description of the new species. Christmas tree coral in California has been observed as far back as 1995, however the species was unknown to science until 2005.

Christmas tree corals are colonial cnidarians, which grow in vertical, bushy formations from an individual holdfast. Along the corals grow polyps which excrete calcium carbonate to build the coral skeleton. A. dendochristos was uniquely identified by the orientation of its branching Christmas tree corals have a range of colors including white, from which their name was inspired, to red and brown.

In one study, 15% of observed specimens of A. dendochristos had many invertebrates living among the coral polyps. Small crabs, sea stars, and barnacles have been seen among the branches of the corals.

== Range and Habitat ==
A. dendochristos, has been observed along the coast of California and across the northeast Pacific between 100 to 1200 meters deep. The coral grows in bushy groups up to several meters high.

Antipatharians have been found across the global ocean, almost exclusively below 50 m depth. Due to the significant challenges with deep surveying, studies have looked at suitability of habitat for Anthiparians and found wide ranging habitats, seen in the map below.

== Threats ==
Antipatharians are considered members of Vulnerable Marine Ecosystems (VMEs). Studies of Antipatharia have found them to be very widely distributed across benthic habitats and extremely long lived, which makes them susceptible to deep sea threats such as fishing or energy extraction. The skeletons of black corals are also prized for their usage in jewelry which is an additional threat for the group.
