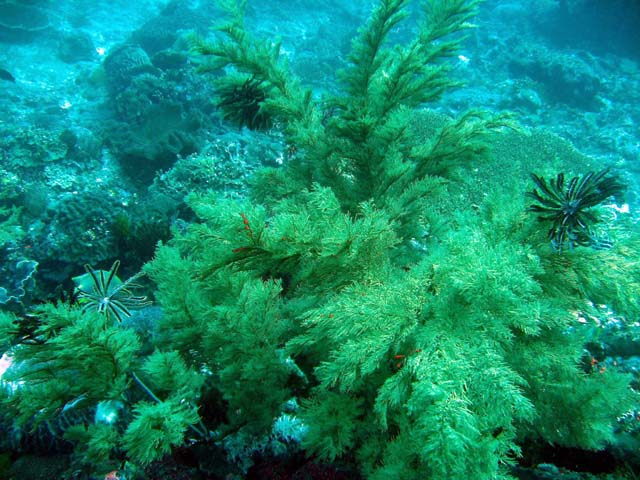
- Antipathes dichotoma from Bali, Indonesia

Scientific classification
- Kingdom: Animalia
- Phylum: Cnidaria
- Subphylum: Anthozoa
- Class: Hexacorallia
- Order: Antipatharia
- Family: Antipathidae
- Genus: Antipathes; Pallas, 1776

Species
- See Species section

Synonyms
- Arachnopathes Milne Edwards H., 1857

= Antipathes =

Genus of corals

Antipathes is a genus of coral in the order Antipatharia, composed of black coral (so named for its black skeleton). Distinct features vary greatly within this genus: it contains symmetrically aligned as well as irregularly shaped corals, a range of different colors, and colonies that can be either sparsely branched or closely packed. polyps for these corals have six tentacles that are each lined with stinging cells. Unlike their reef-building cousins, these coral lack photosynthesizing algae and are not restricted to the lighter surface regions. They prefer to live in deeper waters near currents so they can catch and eat passing zooplankton.

== Species ==
Species included in this genus are:

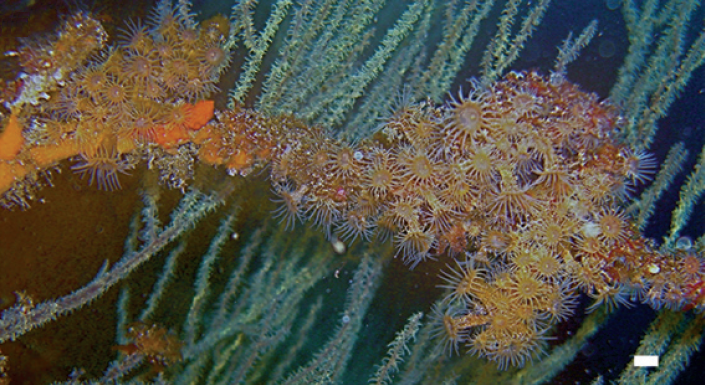
Colony of zoanthid Antipathozoanthus hickmani covering an Antipathes galapagensis just off Pinzón Island

- Antipathes aculeata (Brook, 1889)
- Antipathes arborea Dana, 1846
- Antipathes assimilis (Brook, 1889)
- Antipathes atlantica Gray, 1857
- Antipathes brooki (Whitelegge & Hill, 1899)
- Antipathes caribbeana Opresko, 1996
- Antipathes catharinae (Pax, 1932)
- Antipathes ceylonensis (Thomson & Simpson, 1905)
- Antipathes chamaemorus Pax & Tischbierek, 1932
- Antipathes chota Cooper, 1903
- Antipathes contorta (Brook, 1889)
- Antipathes craticulata Opresko, 2015
- Antipathes curvata van Pesch, 1914
- Antipathes delicatula Schultze, 1896
- Antipathes dendrochristos Opresko, 2005
- Antipathes densa Silberfeld, 1909
- Antipathes dichotoma Pallas, 1766
- Antipathes dofleini Pax, 1915
- Antipathes dubia (Brook, 1889)
- Antipathes elegans (Thomson & Simpson, 1905)
- Antipathes erinaceus (Roule, 1905)
- Antipathes fragilis Gravier, 1918
- Antipathes fruticosa Gray, 1857
- Antipathes furcata Gray, 1857
- Antipathes galapagensis Deichmann, 1941
- Antipathes gallensis Thomson & Simpson, 1905
- Antipathes gracilis Gray, 1860
- Antipathes grandiflora Silberfeld, 1909
- Antipathes grandis Verrill, 1928
- Antipathes grayi Roule, 1905
- Antipathes griggi Opresko, 2009
- Antipathes herdmanni Cooper, 1909
- Antipathes hypnoides (Brook, 1889)
- Antipathes indistincta (van Pesch, 1914)
- Antipathes irregularis (Thomson & Simpson, 1905)
- Antipathes irregularis Cooper, 1909
- Antipathes irregularis Verrill, 1928
- Antipathes lenta Pourtalès, 1871
- Antipathes lentipinna Brook, 1889
- Antipathes longibrachiata van Pesch, 1914
- Antipathes minor (Brook, 1889)
- Antipathes nilanduensis Cooper, 1903
- Antipathes orichalcea Pallas, 1766
- Antipathes pauroclema Pax & Tischbierek, 1932
- Antipathes plana Cooper, 1909
- Antipathes plantagenista (Cooper, 1903)
- Antipathes pseudodichotoma Silberfeld, 1909
- Antipathes regularis Cooper, 1903
- Antipathes rhipidion Pax, 1916
- Antipathes rubra Cooper, 1903
- Antipathes rubusiformis Warner & Opresko, 2004
- Antipathes salicoides Summers, 1910
- Antipathes sarothrum Pax, 1932
- Antipathes sealarki Cooper, 1909
- Antipathes sibogae (van Pesch, 1914)
- Antipathes simplex (Schultze, 1896)
- Antipathes simpsoni (Summers, 1910)
- Antipathes speciosa (Brook, 1889)
- Antipathes spinulosa (Schultze, 1896)
- Antipathes taxiformis Duchassaing, 1870
- Antipathes tenuispina (Silberfeld, 1909)
- Antipathes ternatensis Schultze, 1896
- Antipathes thamnoides (Schultze, 1896)
- Antipathes tristis (Duchassaing, 1870)
- Antipathes umbratica Opresko, 1996
- Antipathes viminalis Roule, 1902
- Antipathes virgata Esper, 1788
- Antipathes zoothallus Pax, 1932
