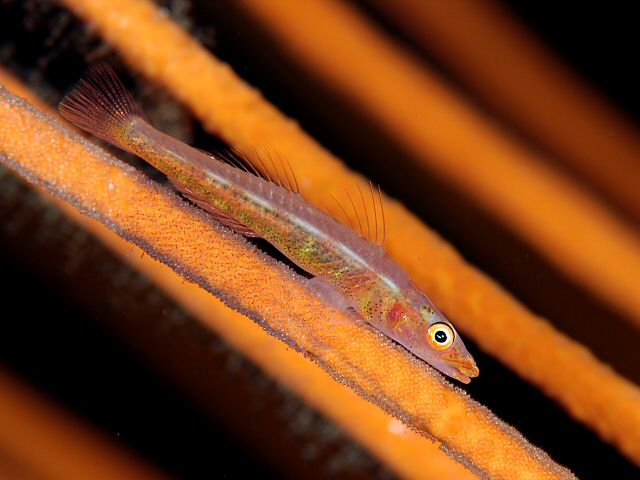

Conservation status
- Least Concern (IUCN 3.1)

Scientific classification
- Kingdom: Animalia
- Phylum: Chordata
- Class: Actinopterygii
- Order: Gobiiformes
- Family: Gobiidae
- Genus: Bryaninops
- Species: B. amplus

Binomial name
- Bryaninops amplus Larson, 1985

= Bryaninops amplus =

Species of fish

Bryaninops amplus, known commonly as the large whip goby or white-line seawhip goby, is a species of marine fish in the family Gobiidae.

The white-line seawhip goby is widespread throughout the tropical waters of the Indo-Pacific area, including Hawaii but not the Red Sea.

This fish is a small size that can reach a maximum size of 4.6 cm length.

The large whip gobies are habitat specialists who are found in male-female pairs, or small groups clinging to gorgonian or antipatharian branches for shelter.The gobies don't have a strong preference for any specific type of host coral, but their occupancy depended on colony height. This makes them more likely to be found on multi-branched corals like Dichotella gemmacea than unbranched Junceella juncea. The gobies are more likely to live on taller host-gorgonians because they are a more effective habitat and provide refuge from predators. Indicating gorgonian sea whip abundance and size have a positive association with the sea whip goby density and group size.
