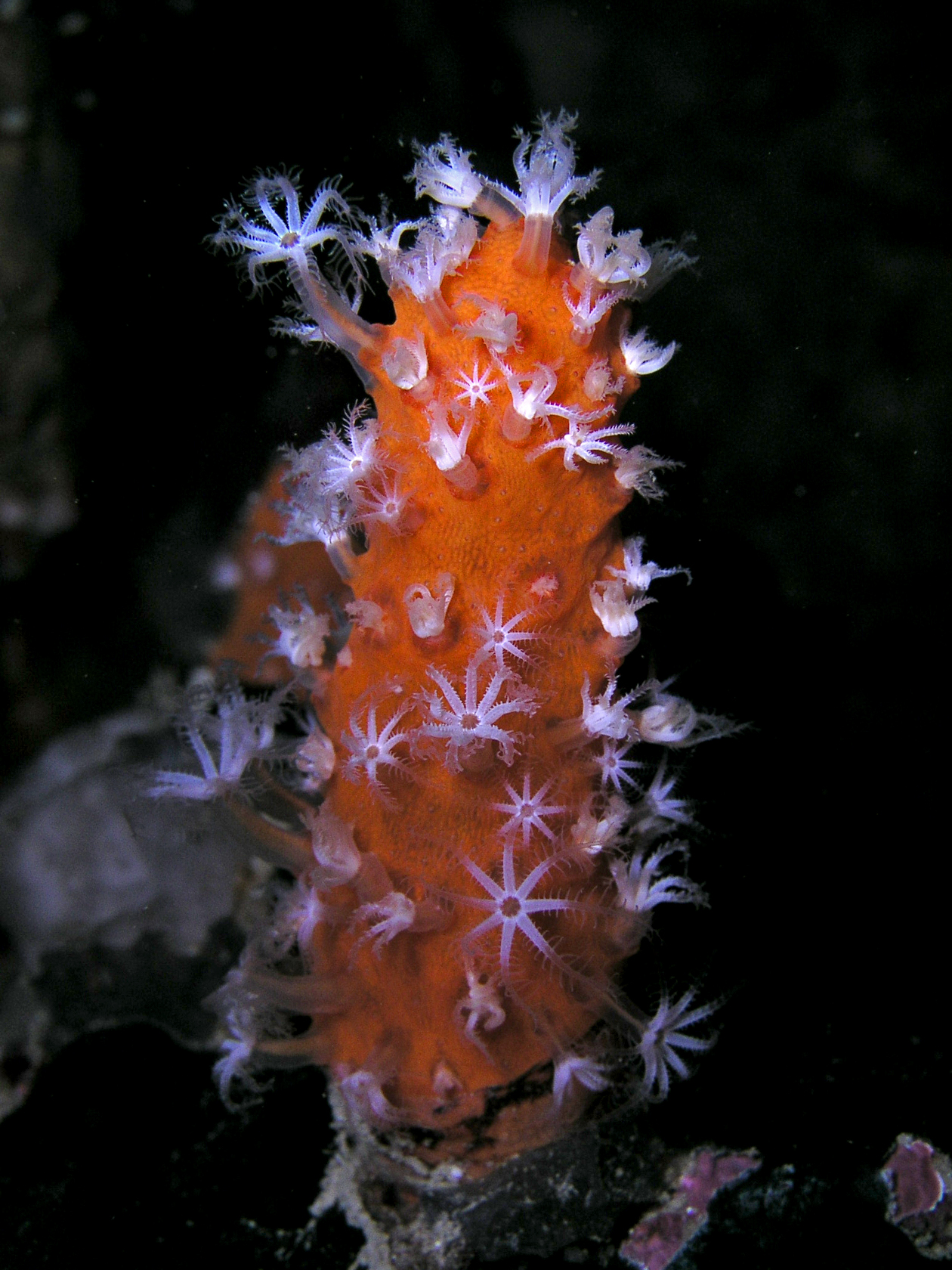

Scientific classification
- Kingdom: Animalia
- Phylum: Cnidaria
- Subphylum: Anthozoa
- Class: Octocorallia
- Order: Malacalcyonacea
- Family: Alcyoniidae
- Genus: Paraminabea
- Species: P. aldersladei

Binomial name
- Paraminabea aldersladei (Williams, 1992)

Synonyms
- Minabea aldersladei Williams, 1992

= Paraminabea aldersladei =

Species of coral

Paraminabea aldersladei is a species of soft coral in the family Alcyoniidae. It is found in the central Indo-Pacific. This coral looks like an upside down carrot growing out of the substrate. Its striking white polyps are extended only at night to feed.
