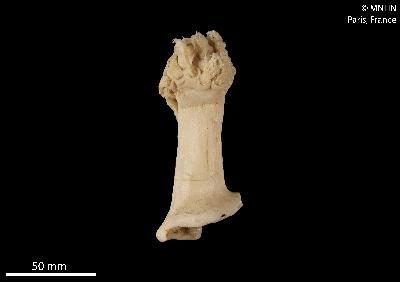

Scientific classification
- Kingdom: Animalia
- Phylum: Cnidaria
- Subphylum: Anthozoa
- Class: Octocorallia
- Order: Malacalcyonacea
- Family: Alcyoniidae
- Genus: Anthomastus
- Species: A. giganteus

Binomial name
- Anthomastus giganteus Tixier-Durivault, 1954

= Anthomastus giganteus =

Species of soft coral

Anthomastus giganteus, or the gigantic soft coral, is a deep dwelling species of soft coral from South Africa.

== Description ==
This soft coral is made up of large, fleshy polyps arising from a single long stalk. All the polyps are autozoids, meaning that they are independent and capable of feeding themselves.stalked. The disc-like base is often attached to a hard substance or to debris. The stalk ranges from pink or red to orange and the polyps are a paler beige, white or pinkish colour. Alternatively, the whole organism may be white in colour.

== Distribution and habitat ==
This species is known from the coast of South Africa. It is one of the deepest occurring soft corals and has been found at depths of up to 450 m (1,480 ft).
