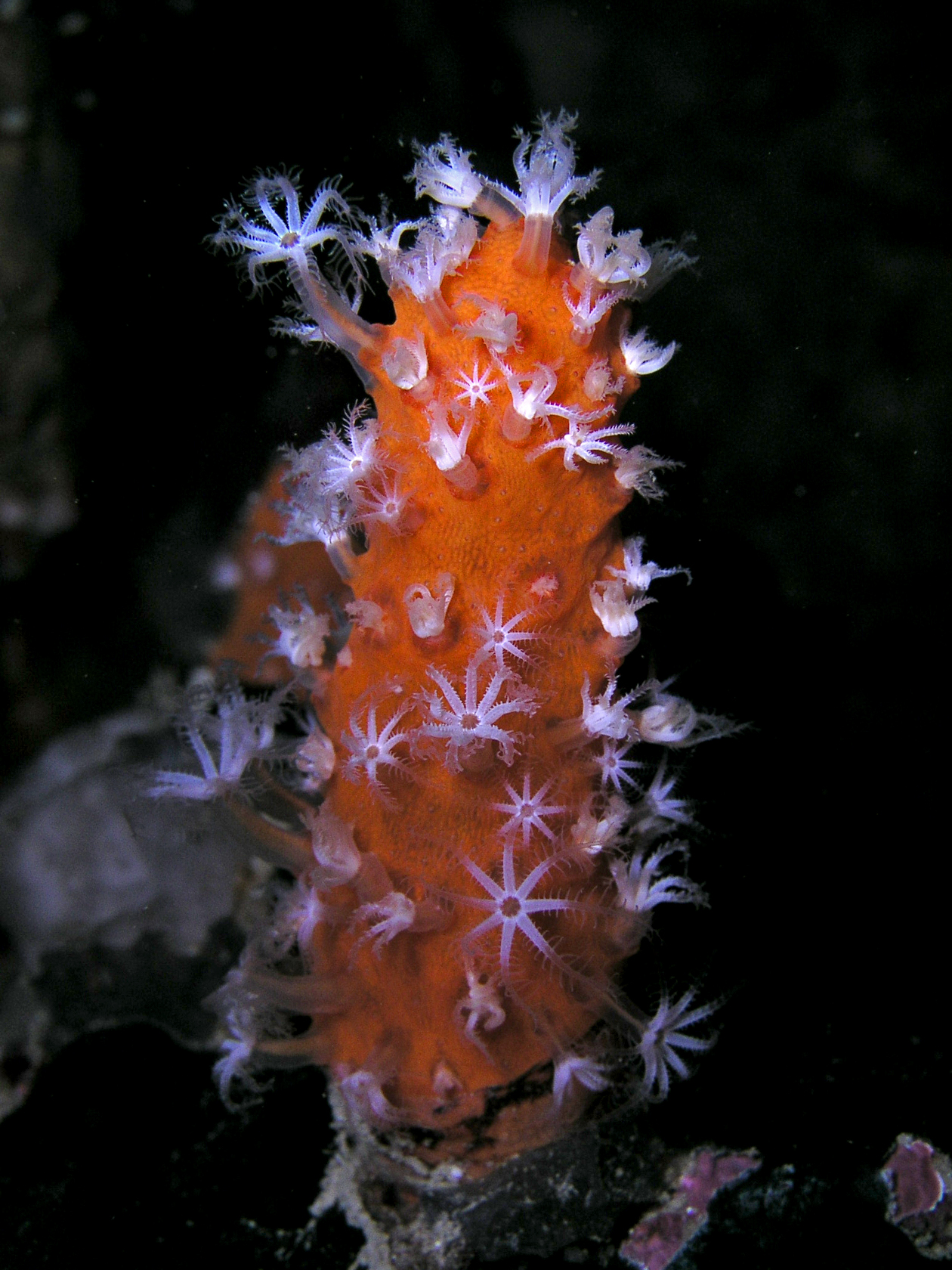
- Paraminabea aldersladei

Scientific classification
- Kingdom: Animalia
- Phylum: Cnidaria
- Subphylum: Anthozoa
- Class: Octocorallia
- Order: Scleralcyonacea
- Family: Coralliidae
- Genus: Paraminabea; Williams & Alderslade, 1999

= Paraminabea =

Genus of corals

Paraminabea is a genus of soft corals in the family Coralliidae.

== Species ==
There are currently 10 species classified in this genus.

- Paraminabea acronocephala (Williams, 1992)
- Paraminabea aldersladei (Williams, 1992)
- Paraminabea arborea Williams & Alderslade, 1999
- Paraminabea cosmarioides (Williams, 1992)
- Paraminabea goslineri (Williams, 1992)
- Paraminabea hongkongensis Lam & Morton, 2008
- Paraminabea indica (Thomson & Henderson, 1905)
- Paraminabea kosiensis (Williams, 1992)
- Paraminabea robusta (Utinomi & Imahara, 1976)
- Paraminabea rubeusa Benayahu & Fabricius, 2010
- Paraminabea xishaensis Luan, Xia, Takata, Kikuchi, Yasuda, Liu & Liu, 2026
