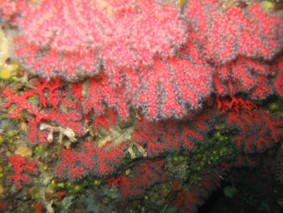
- Corallium rubrum

Scientific classification
- Kingdom: Animalia
- Phylum: Cnidaria
- Subphylum: Anthozoa
- Class: Octocorallia
- Order: Scleralcyonacea
- Family: Coralliidae; Lamouroux, 1812

Genera
- see text

Synonyms
- Paragorgiidae Kükenthal, 1916

= Coralliidae =

Family of corals

Coralliidae, also known as precious corals, is a taxonomic family of soft corals belonging to the order Scleralcyonacea of the phylum Cnidaria. These sessile corals are one of the most dominant members of hard-bottomed benthic environments such as seamounts, canyons and continental shelves. From this coral family results 69 descendants in which each species plays a key role in forming habitats for a variety of marine species.

Due to their unique trait of possessing a red calcium carbonate skeleton, these corals can be harvested in order to create handcrafted amulets, jewelry and other valuable artifacts, giving rise to its reputed name of "precious corals". Correspondingly, members of this family are vulnerable to the negative impacts of overharvestation imposed by mass coral trade.

== Description ==
Members of this family Coralliidae are also considered "soft corals" which are sedentary, colonial polypoids. Animals of this class have a simple cup shaped body that consists of two layers of cells, sloping peripheral platforms and wide axial pits. Each of these members have 8 unpaired, pinnate and 8 mesenteries utilized for filter feeding and defense. All species have numerous calcareous skeletal elements called sclerites that can be found on the surface ranging from 3 mm to 5 mm, diverging in many directions. The endoskeleton is composed of tiny stick-like calcium carbonate rods that fuse together to form a rigid structure which may be colored red, pink, or white. Coralliidae exhibit two different distributions within a colony and their spacing across the colony surface. Corals can be either roughly equal in size and evenly distributed across the colony surface, or unevenly distributed and vary in size. However, the general trend observed is one of a proportionally positive relationship between coral colony age and polyp and height size.

Traditionally the family was divided into three genera, based upon their polyps distribution: Corallium, Hemicorallium, and Paracorallium. However, following a taxonomic revision of the Octocorallia, the family was revised to include genera previously placed in families Paragorgiidae and Sibogagorgiidae, as well as some from Alcyoniidae.

The following genera are now included in family Coralliidae:

- Carotalcyon Utinomi, 1952
- Corallium Cuvier, 1798
- Hemicorallium Gray, 1867
- Minabea Utinomi, 1957
- Mollecorallium Altuna & López-González, 2023
- Notodysiferus Alderslade, 2003
- Paragorgia Milne Edwards, 1857
- Paraminabea Williams & Alderslade, 1999
- Pleurocorallium Gray, 1867
- Sibogagorgia Stiasny, 1937
- Sphaerasclera McFadden & van Ofwegen, 2013
- Subfamily Anthomastinae Verrill, 1922
  - Anthomastus Verrill, 1878
  - Bathyalcyon Versluys, 1906
  - Heteropolypus Tixier-Durivault, 1964
  - Pseudoanthomastus Tixier-Durivault & d'Hondt, 1974

Genera	Description	Image
Corallium	This species is composed of small bumps (verracuae) that are slightly elevated from the surface of the corals. These verracue surround the entirety of the coral. The color of the cortex varies from the more common crimson red to the rarer yellow color to the even more rare color white.	Corallium konojoi
Hemicorallium	The verrucuae within this coral are slightly raised, like Corallium, but confined to one surface near the edges of the main branches forking in one direction. The color of the cortex is usually a cream white and the axis contains light red tints.	Hemicorallium
Paracorallium	This genera is characterized by sclerite crosses and 6 and 8-radiate capstans that may or may not be symmetric which can give rise to smooth double clubs in some species in this genera. The color of the cortex is usually light red with the axis having light pint tints.	Paracorallium japonicum

== Distribution ==
Species belonging to this family of Coralliidae typically inhabit tropical, subtropical and temperate oceans regions within oceans around the world. Unlike corals which can be found in shallow waters, these precious corals can be found in greater depths of 60 to 2,000 meters (200 to 6,560 feet). Most species can be found in large numbers around the west and central Pacific, including the surrounding seas of New Caledonia, Taiwan, Japan and the Hawaiian Archipelago. Species diversity of this family of corals is decreased in the Atlantic, Indian, and eastern Pacific oceans. However, corals of the Hemicorallium and Paracorallium genera can be found in abundance around the seamounts around Japan and China. Likewise, the corals of the genera Corallium are widespread along the Mediterranean and the neighboring Atlantic coasts and is primarily seen around the central and western basin. Whereas population tends to decrease in deeper water in the eastern basin and around the Canary Islands, southern Portugal and Cape Verde. The two places to date that have been reported to have high levels of species diversity and exploited populations are the Mediterranean Sea and the adjacent Atlantic, together with the Northern Pacific Ocean.

== Biological behavior ==
=== Feeding ===
All polyps of the order Alcyonacea consists of tentacles and pinnules to capture food. The tentacles located on the coral lie in the same plane as the mesenteries, concave oral discs, but are bent slightly forward or backward. This orientation is beneficial in the feeding process as the tentacle(s) can enter what is known as the preparatory feeding position, giving rise to the raptorial manner of feeding observed in these corals.

Once food is captured by the tentacles, it will flex toward the mouth, where the food will then be sucked into the pharynx. After the tentacle is free of the food particle, it will then be flexed outward and assume the preparatory feeding position again. In order to capture bigger prey like brine shrimp, several tentacles must repeat the raptorial manner of feeding in conjunction.

=== Reproduction ===
Within this family of the order Alconycea, also known as Octocorallia, two types of sexual reproduction strategies can be seen. One strategy involves the process where corals release both sperm and eggs into the water in mass quantities and fertilize, a process also known as broadcast spawning. The other involves fertilization in or on a maternal colony, in which embryos are incubated either internally or externally of the colony. Once fertilization takes place, the formation of a larval polyp known as a planula arises. This planula will then float around in the ocean for several days until it can attach to a hard surface and bud into a developing colony. These reproductive strategies may also change from location to location, as seen within the species of the Corallium genera C. rubrum. Within the Indo-Pacific Ocean, this species uses broadcast spawning to reproduce whereas the Mediterranean species releases planulae, a larval form of the coral. Reproductive behavior appears also differ with temperature with as reproductivity is seen at higher levels during the months of May to August.

=== Defense & predation ===
These soft corals have nematocysts and allelochemicals, sclerites and other protective mechanisms that make them rarely predated upon. Along with these defense systems, corals have low nutritional value, therefore making them unpreferable as a choice of food.

== Exploitation by coral trade ==
Coral fisheries impose detrimental effects on coral colonies within oceans around the world. Before the 1970s, fisheries involved extraction of coral using net attached dredges or small sailboats. However, by the 1970s, fisheries started to stray away from sail boats and began to utilize motorized boats that consisted of metal dredges much longer than those used prior to the 70s. These motorized boats were also capable of carrying much heavier weight aboard thus causing damage to the coral colonies underneath leading to limited a supply of corals.

Due to the slow growth period of these corals, they cannot keep up with the rates in which coral harvesting occurs by these fisheries resulting in overexploitation. One area that experienced this decline in fishing yields was the Mediterranean Ocean in the 1980s, and as a result the United Nations soon placed guidelines on coral harvestation and banned dredging for corals in 1994. However, recently data has shown ongoing declining population numbers of the corals, which prompted the EU and the US to include the family Corallidae in the CITES Appendix II in order to regulate its trade.
