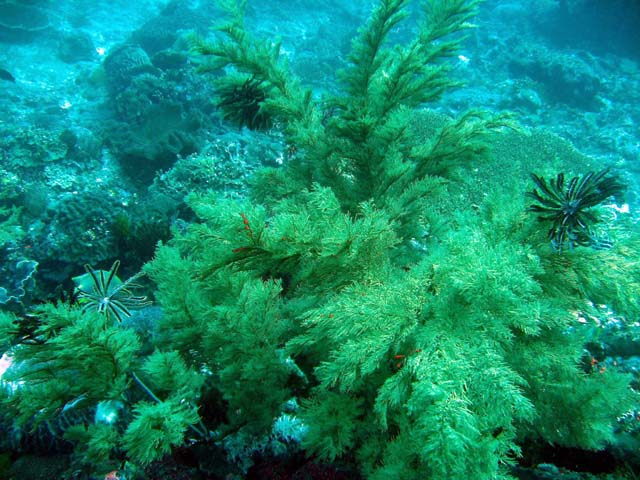
- Growing in Bali, Indonesia

Conservation status
- Near Threatened (IUCN 3.1) (Mediterranean)

Scientific classification
- Kingdom: Animalia
- Phylum: Cnidaria
- Subphylum: Anthozoa
- Class: Hexacorallia
- Order: Antipatharia
- Family: Antipathidae
- Genus: Antipathes
- Species: A. dichotoma

Binomial name
- Antipathes dichotoma Pallas, 1776

Synonyms
- Antipathes aenea von Koch, 1889; Antipathes mediterranea Brook, 1889

= Antipathes dichotoma =

Species of coral

Antipathes dichotoma is a species of colonial coral in the order Antipatharia, the black corals, so named because their calcareous skeletons are black. It was first described by the German zoologist and botanist Peter Simon Pallas in 1766, from a single specimen he received from near Marseille in the Mediterranean Sea.

== Description ==
A colony of Antipathes dichotoma can grow to a height of 1 m (3 ft 3 in) or more. It forms a sparsely branching structure with slender, flexible branches arranged irregularly around the trunk. The angle at which the branches project is variable but is often nearly 90°. The smaller branches bear four to six rows of short, smooth conical spines. The polyps are 2 to 2.4 mm (0.08 to 0.09 in) in diameter with three or four polyps per centimetre. They are arranged in a single series on the smallest branches and in multiple series on the largest ones. There is considerable variation in appearance of neighbouring colonies and in different parts of the same colony.

== Distribution ==
Antipathes dichotoma occurs in the Mediterranean Sea and parts of the temperate western Atlantic Ocean. Its range includes waters off the coast of Marseille, the Gulf of Naples, the Tyrrhenian Sea, the Bay of Biscay and off the coast of Morocco. It is a deep water species and is found at depths of 200 to 300 m (656 to 984 ft). Where this species has been recorded as occurring in the Indo-Pacific region, it may have been misidentified. The black coral growing off Hawaii, for example, has been reclassified as Antipathes griggi.
