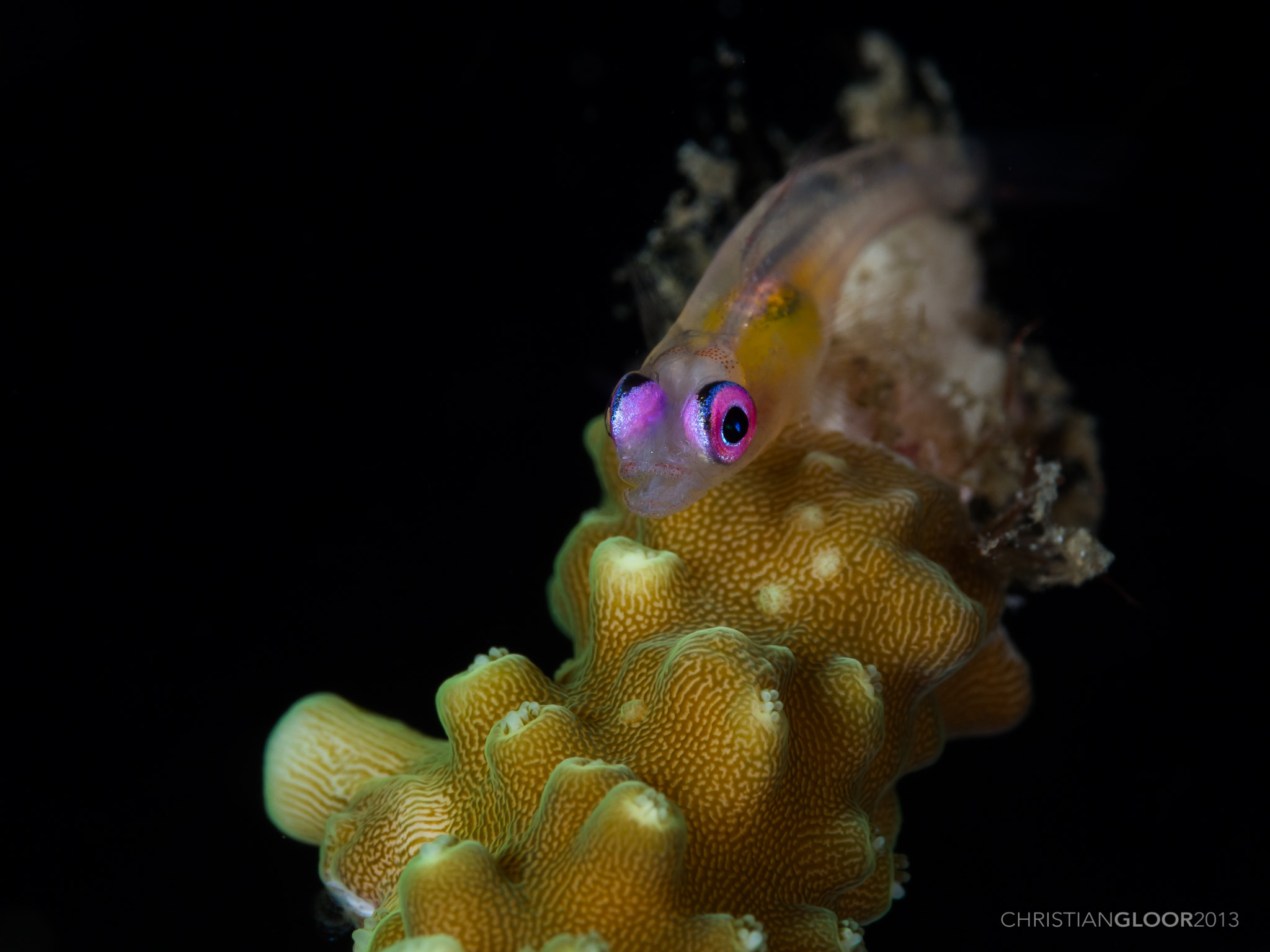

Scientific classification
- Kingdom: Animalia
- Phylum: Chordata
- Class: Actinopterygii
- Order: Gobiiformes
- Family: Gobiidae
- Genus: Bryaninops
- Species: B. natans

Binomial name
- Bryaninops natans Larson, 1985

= Bryaninops natans =

Species of fish

Bryaninops natans, known commonly as the redeye goby, is a species of marine fish in the family Gobiidae.

The redeye goby is widespread throughout the tropical waters of the Indo-Pacific area, including Red Sea.

B. natans is a small size that can reach a maximum size of 2.5 cm length.
