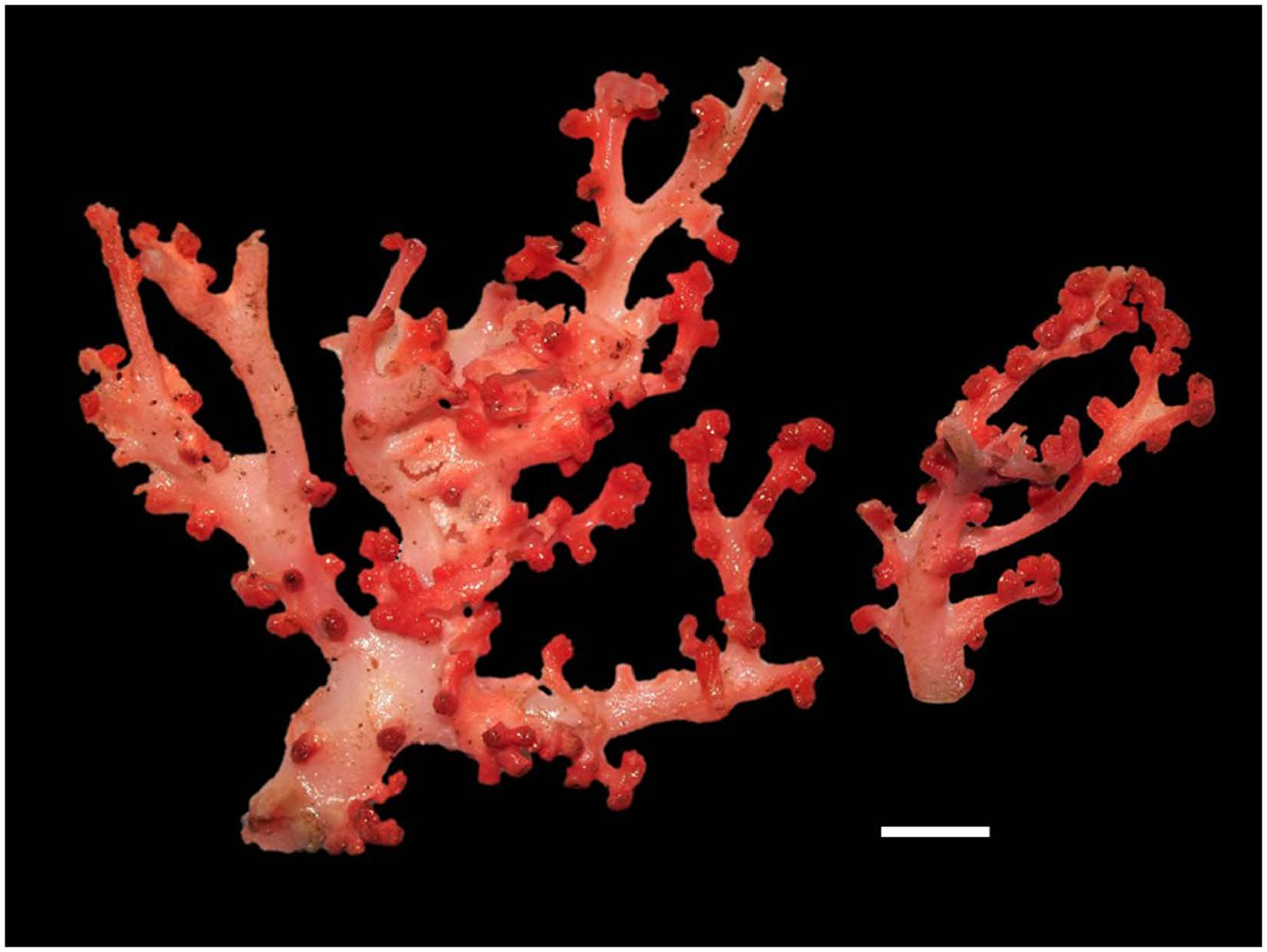
- Holotype specimen of Hemicorallium meraboshi. The scale bar is 10 mm.
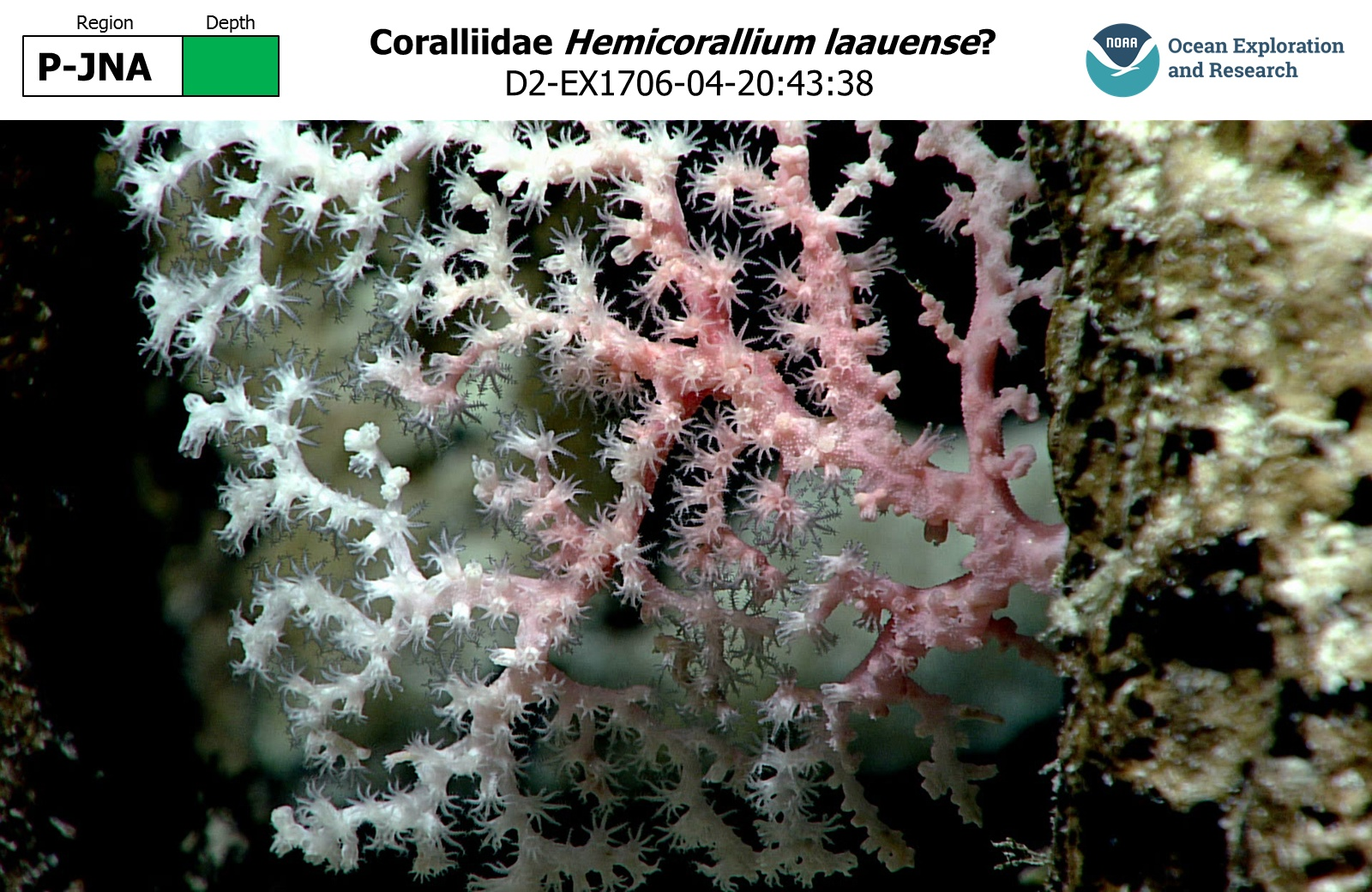
- A unknown Hemicorallium sp.

Scientific classification
- Kingdom: Animalia
- Phylum: Cnidaria
- Subphylum: Anthozoa
- Class: Octocorallia
- Order: Scleralcyonacea
- Family: Coralliidae
- Genus: Hemicorallium; Gray, 1867

Diversity
- 26 species

= Hemicorallium =

Genus of corals

Hemicorallium is a genus of octocorallid corals that belongs to the family Coralliidae. They are found in the Pacific and Atlantic Oceans.

== Distribution ==
Members of this genus are distributed across both the Pacific and Atlantic Ocean’s. They tend to inhabit particularly deep waters. Most species seem to originate in the Pacific around Hawaii and the Sea of Japan. There is a notable lack of species from the Indian Ocean.

== Taxonomy ==
The taxonomy of genus Hemicorallium has undergone multiple resurrections and reorganisations with further need for reclassification possibly needed.

=== Species ===
There are currently 26 described species within this genus. However there may be many undescribed species due to their hard to access deep water habitats allowing for poor sampling opportunities. A list of species can be found below:

- Hemicorallium abyssale (Bayer, 1956)
- Hemicorallium aurantiacum Tu, Dai & Jeng, 2016
- Hemicorallium bathyrubrum (Simpson & Watling, 2011)
- Hemicorallium bayeri (Simpson & Watling, 2011)
- Hemicorallium boshuense (Kishinouye, 1903)
- Hemicorallium ducale (Bayer, 1955)
- Hemicorallium guttatum Tu, Dai & Jeng, 2016
- Hemicorallium halmaheirense (Hickson, 1907)
- Hemicorallium imperiale (Bayer, 1955)
- Hemicorallium indicodensum Hu, Zhang & Xu, 2025
- Hemicorallium jiaolongensis Hu, Zhang & Xu, 2025
- Hemicorallium kaiyo Nonaka & Hayashibara, 2021
- Hemicorallium laauense (Bayer, 1956)
- Hemicorallium maderense (Johnson, 1898)
- Hemicorallium meraboshi Nonaka, Hanahara & Kakui, 2023
- Hemicorallium muzikae Nonaka & Hayashibara, 2021
- Hemicorallium niobe (Bayer, 1964)
- Hemicorallium regale (Bayer, 1956)
- Hemicorallium reginae (Hickson, 1905)
- Hemicorallium ryukyuense Nonaka, Takata & Yasuda, 2025
- Hemicorallium sulcatum (Kishinouye, 1903)
- Hemicorallium taiwanicum (Tu, Dai & Jeng, 2012)
- Hemicorallium tokiyasui Nonaka & Hayashibara, 2021
- Hemicorallium tricolor (Johnson, 1899)
- Hemicorallium variabile (Thomson & Henderson, 1906)
- Hemicorallium osmanthogemmum Tatsuki Koido, 2026
