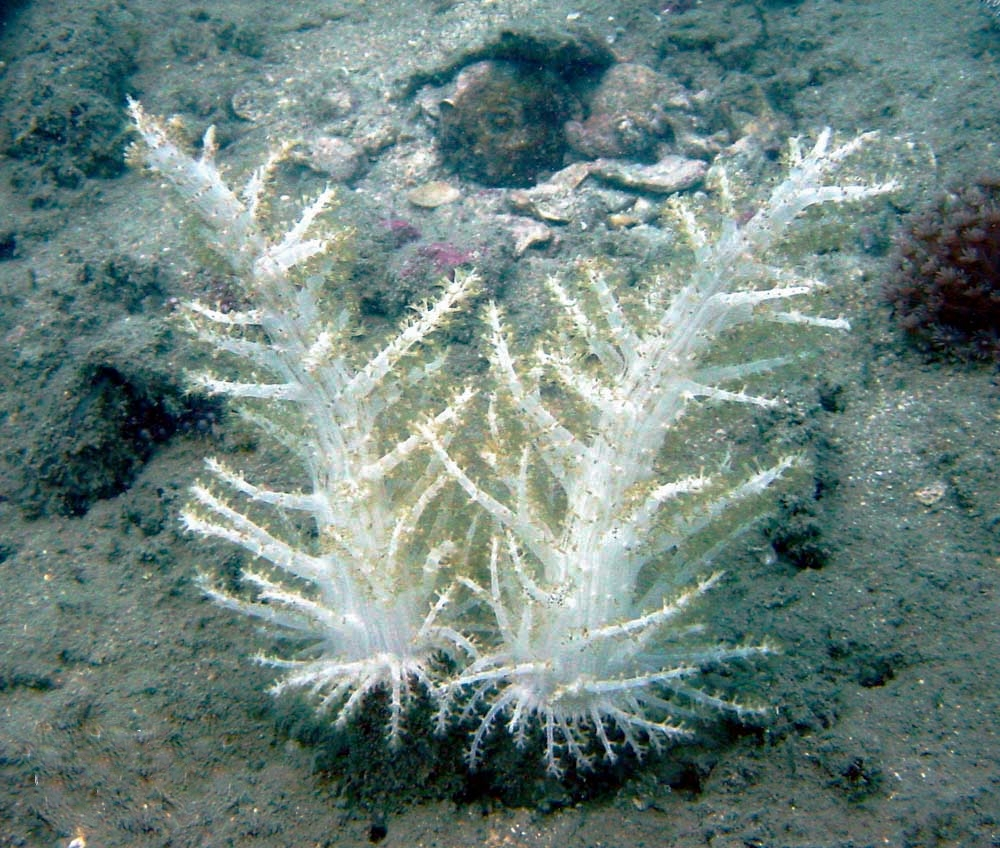
- At Koh Phangan, Thailand

Scientific classification
- Kingdom: Animalia
- Phylum: Cnidaria
- Subphylum: Anthozoa
- Class: Octocorallia
- Order: Malacalcyonacea
- Family: Paralcyoniidae
- Genus: Studeriotes
- Species: S. longiramosa

Binomial name
- Studeriotes longiramosa Kükenthal, 1910

= Studeriotes longiramosa =

Species of coral

Studeriotes longiramosa, also known as Christmas tree coral, is a species of soft coral in the family Paralcyoniidae.
