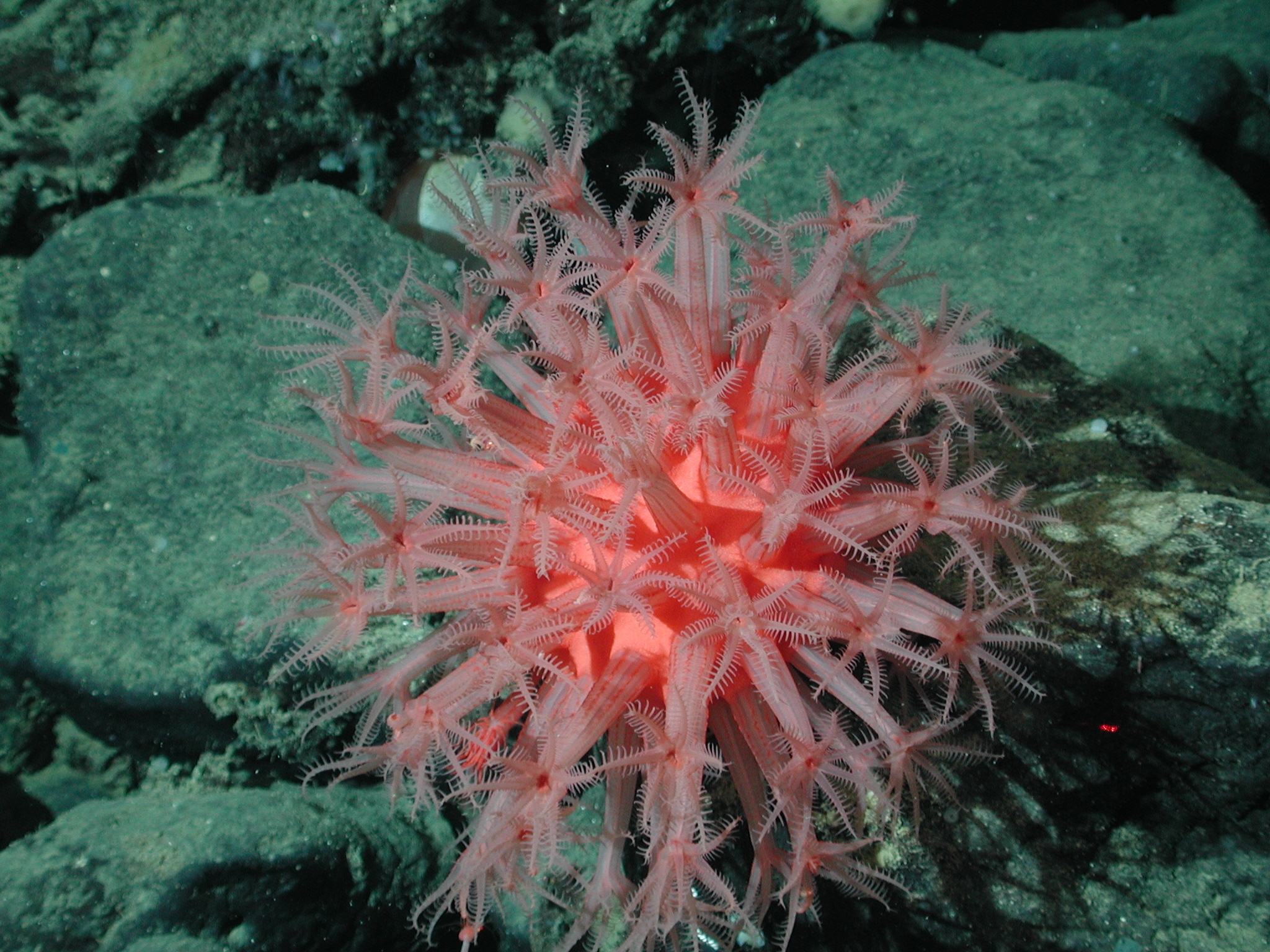
- Heteropolypus ritteri

Scientific classification
- Kingdom: Animalia
- Phylum: Cnidaria
- Subphylum: Anthozoa
- Class: Octocorallia
- Order: Malacalcyonacea
- Family: Alcyoniidae
- Genus: Heteropolypus; Tixier-Durivault, 1964

Species
- See text

= Heteropolypus =

Genus of corals

Heteropolypus is a genus of soft corals in the family Alcyoniidae.

== Species ==
Species in the genus include:

- Heteropolypus insolitus Tixier-Durivault, 1964
- Heteropolypus japonicus (Nutting, 1912)
- Heteropolypus ritteri (Nutting, 1909)
- Heteropolypus sol Molodtsova, 2013
- Heteropolypus steenstrupi (Wright & Studer, 1889)
