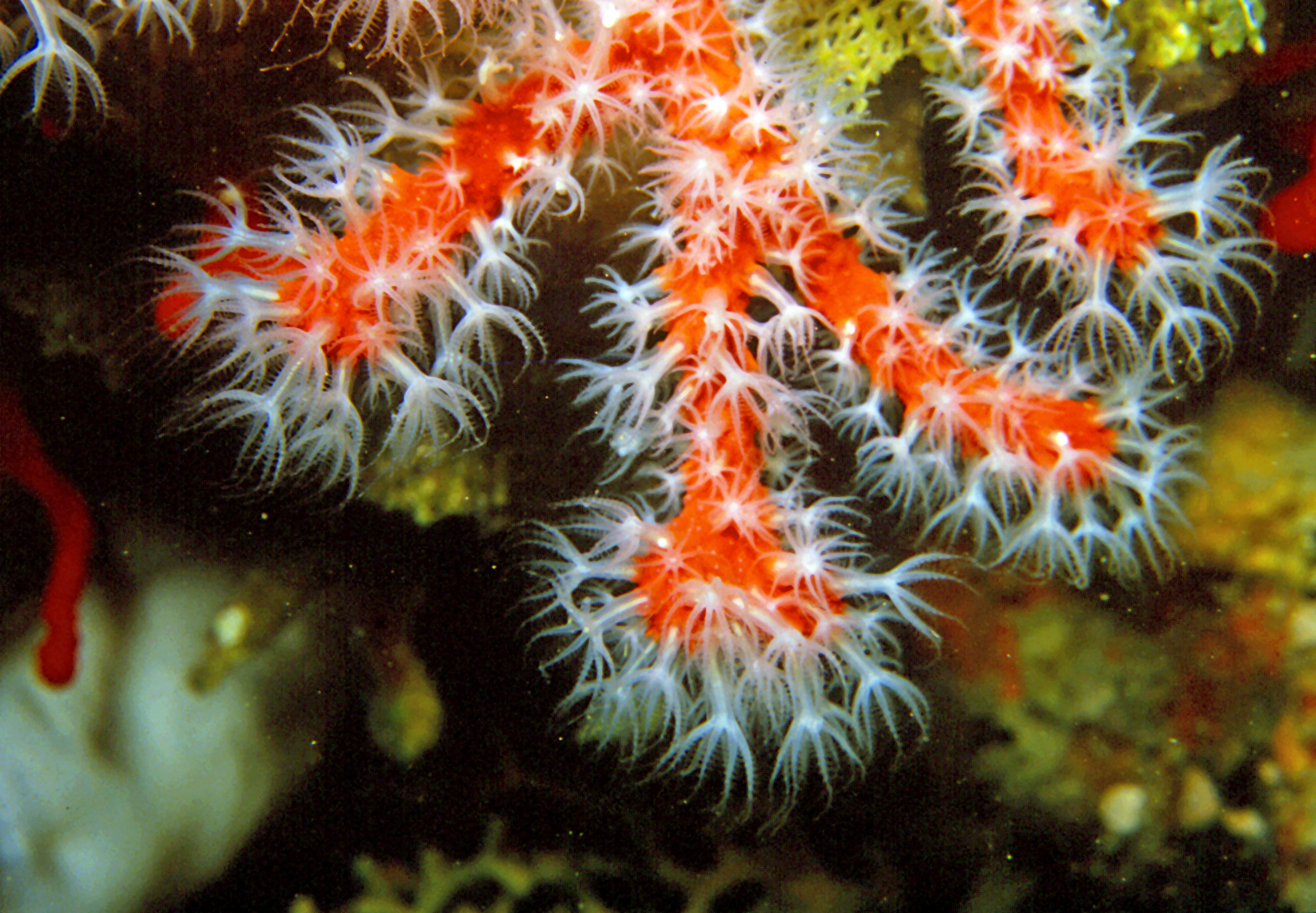
- Precious coral (Corallium rubrum)

Scientific classification
- Kingdom: Animalia
- Phylum: Cnidaria
- Subphylum: Anthozoa
- Class: Octocorallia
- Order: Scleralcyonacea
- Family: Coralliidae
- Genus: Corallium; Cuvier, 1798

Species
- 31 species, see text

= Precious coral =

Genus of marine corals

Precious coral, or red coral, is the common name given to a genus of marine corals, Corallium. The distinguishing characteristic of precious corals is their durable and intensely colored red or pink-orange skeleton, which is used for making jewelry.

== Habitat ==
Red corals grow on rocky sea bottom with low sedimentation, typically in dark environments—either in the depths or in dark caverns or crevices. The first species to be described, C. rubrum (formerly Gorgonia nobilis), is found mainly in the Mediterranean Sea. It grows at depths from 10 to 300 meters below sea level, although the shallower of these habitats have been largely depleted by harvesting. In the underwater caves of Alghero, Sardinia (the "Coral Riviera"), it grows at depth from 4 to 35 meters. The same species is also found at Atlantic sites near the Strait of Gibraltar, at the Cape Verde Islands and off the coast of southern Portugal. Other Corallium species are native to the western Pacific, notably around Japan and Taiwan; these occur at depths of 350 to 1500 meters below sea level in areas with strong currents.

== Anatomy ==
In common with other Octocorallia, red corals have the shape of small leafless bushes and grow up to a meter in height. Their valuable skeleton is composed of intermeshed spicules of hard calcium carbonate, colored in shades of red by carotenoid pigments. In living specimens, the skeletal branches are overlaid with soft bright red integument, from which numerous retractable white polyps protrude. The polyps exhibit octameric radial symmetry.

== Species ==
The following are known species in the genus:

- Corallium abyssale Bayer, 1956
- Corallium bathyrubrum Simpson & Watling, 2011
- Corallium bayeri Simpson & Watling, 2011
- Corallium borneanse Bayer
- Corallium boshuense Kishinouye, 1903
- Corallium carusrubrum Tu, Dai & Jeng, 2012
- Corallium ducale Bayer
- Corallium elatius Ridley, 1882
- Corallium gotoense Nonaka, Muzik & Iwasaki, 2012
- Corallium halmaheirense Hickson, 1907
- Corallium imperiale Bayer
- Corallium japonicum Kishinouye, 1903
- Corallium johnsoni Gray, 1860
- Corallium kishinouyei Bayer, 1996
- Corallium konojoi Kishinouye, 1903
- Corallium laauense Bayer, 1956
- Corallium maderense (Johnson, 1899)
- Corallium medea Bayer, 1964
- Corallium niobe Bayer, 1964
- Corallium niveum Bayer, 1956
- Corallium occultum Tzu-Hsuan Tu et al., 2015
- Corallium porcellanum Pasternak, 1981
- Corallium pusillum Kishinouye, 1903
- Corallium regale Bayer, 1956
- Corallium rubrum (Linnaeus, 1758)
- Corallium secundum Dana, 1846
- Corallium sulcatum Kishinouye, 1903
- Corallium taiwanicum Tu, Dai & Jeng, 2012
- Corallium tricolor (Johnson, 1899)
- Corallium uchidai Nonaka, Muzik & Iwasaki, 2012
- Corallium vanderbilti Boone, 1933
- Corallium variabile (Thomson & Henderson, 1906)

== As a gemstone ==
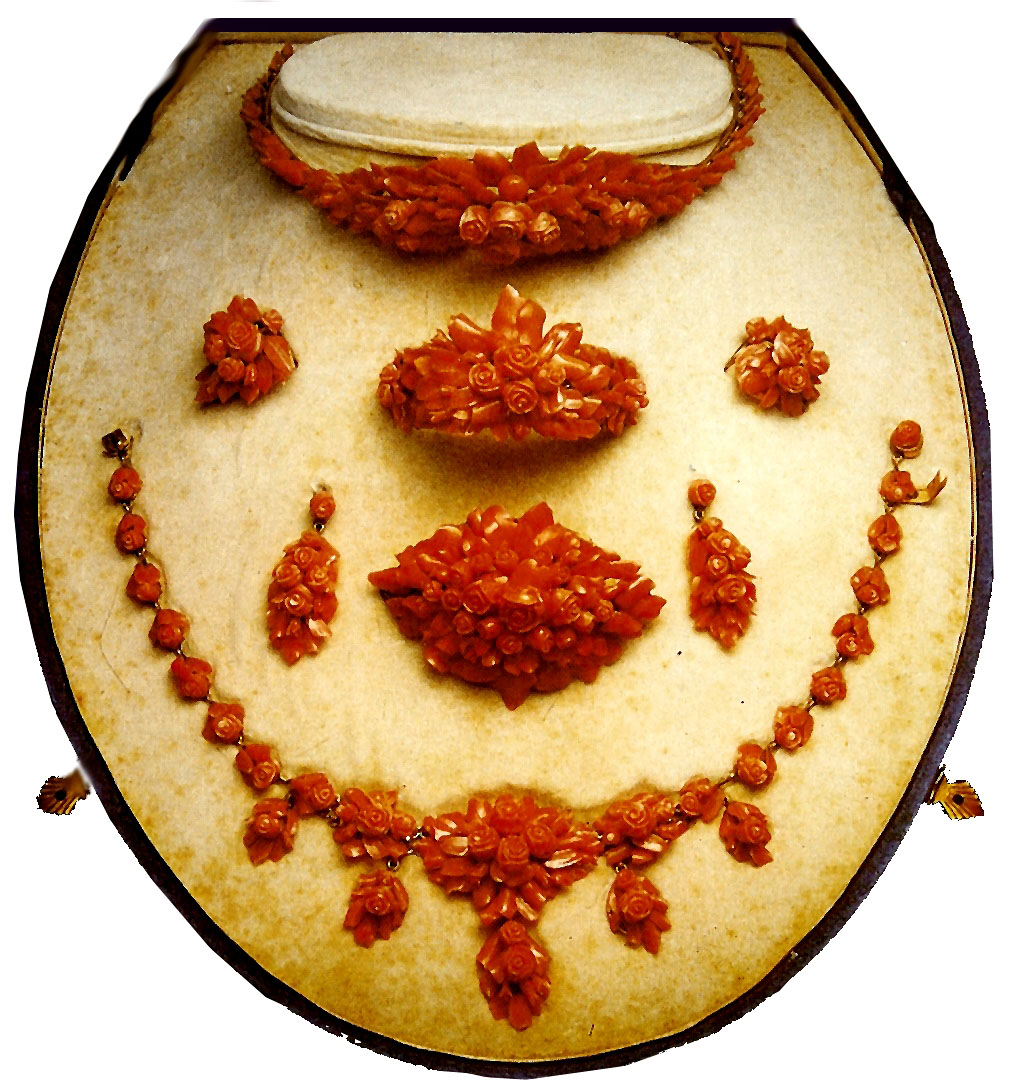
The Queen Farida of Egypt red coral parure by Ascione, made in 1938 in Naples, Coral Jewellery Museum

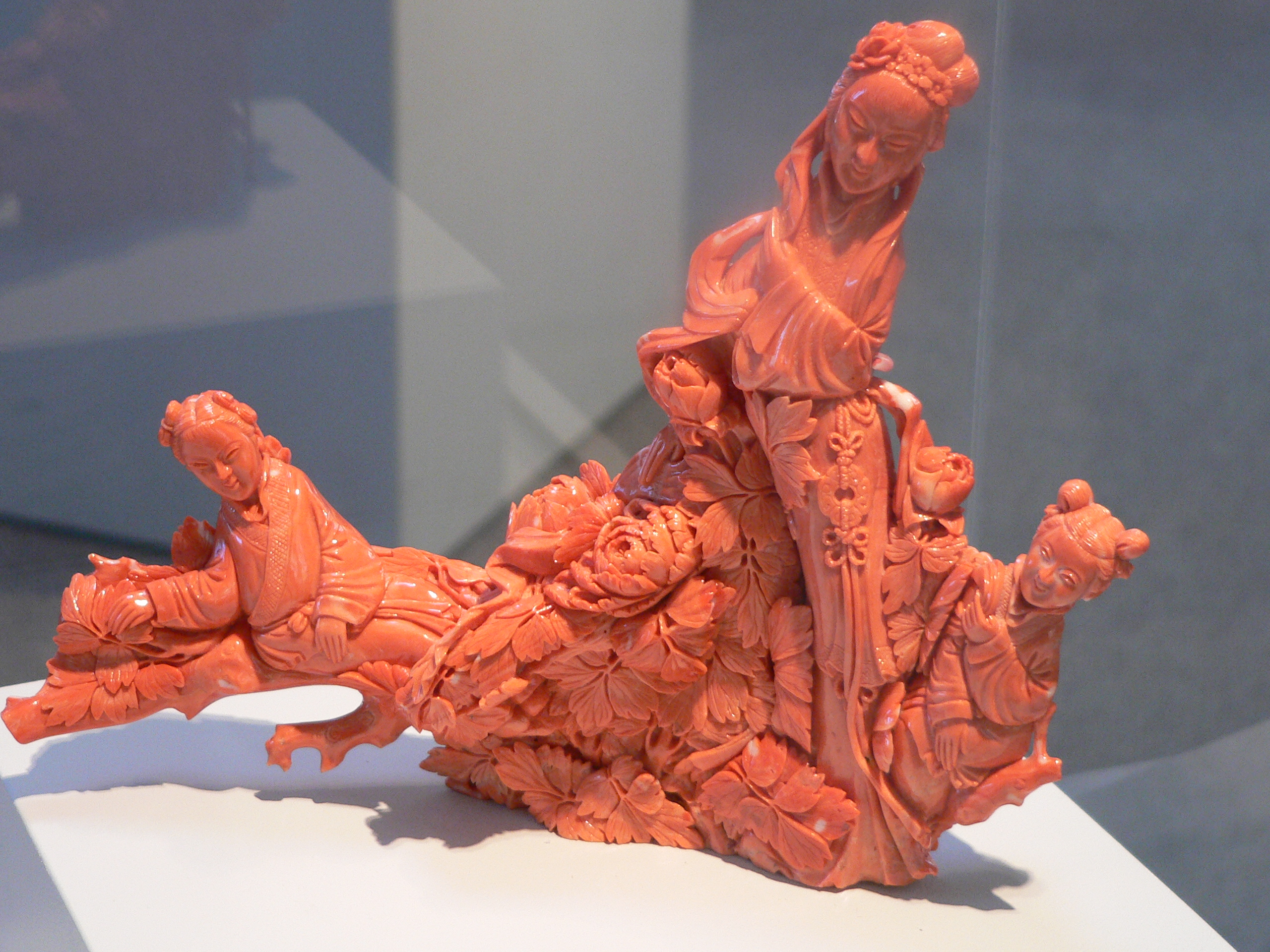
Chinese coral sculpture

The hard skeleton of red coral branches is naturally matte, but can be polished to a glassy shine. It exhibits a range of warm reddish pink colors from pale pink to deep red; the word coral is also used to name such colors. Owing to its intense and permanent coloration and glossiness, precious coral skeletons have been harvested since antiquity for decorative use. Coral jewellery has been found in ancient Egyptian and prehistoric European burials, and continues to be made to the present day. It was especially popular during the Victorian age.

Precious coral has hardness 3.5 on the Mohs scale. Due to its softness and opacity, coral is usually cut en cabochon, or used to make beads.

== History of trade ==
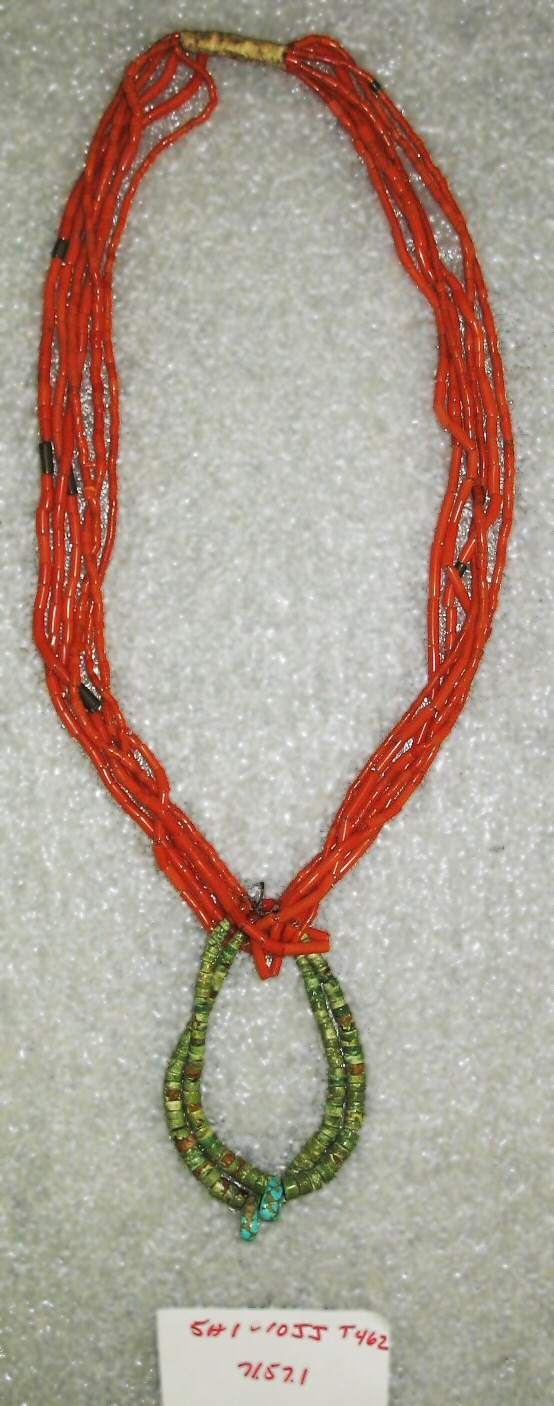
6-Strand Necklace, Navajo (Native American), c. 1920s, Brooklyn Museum

Coral earrings

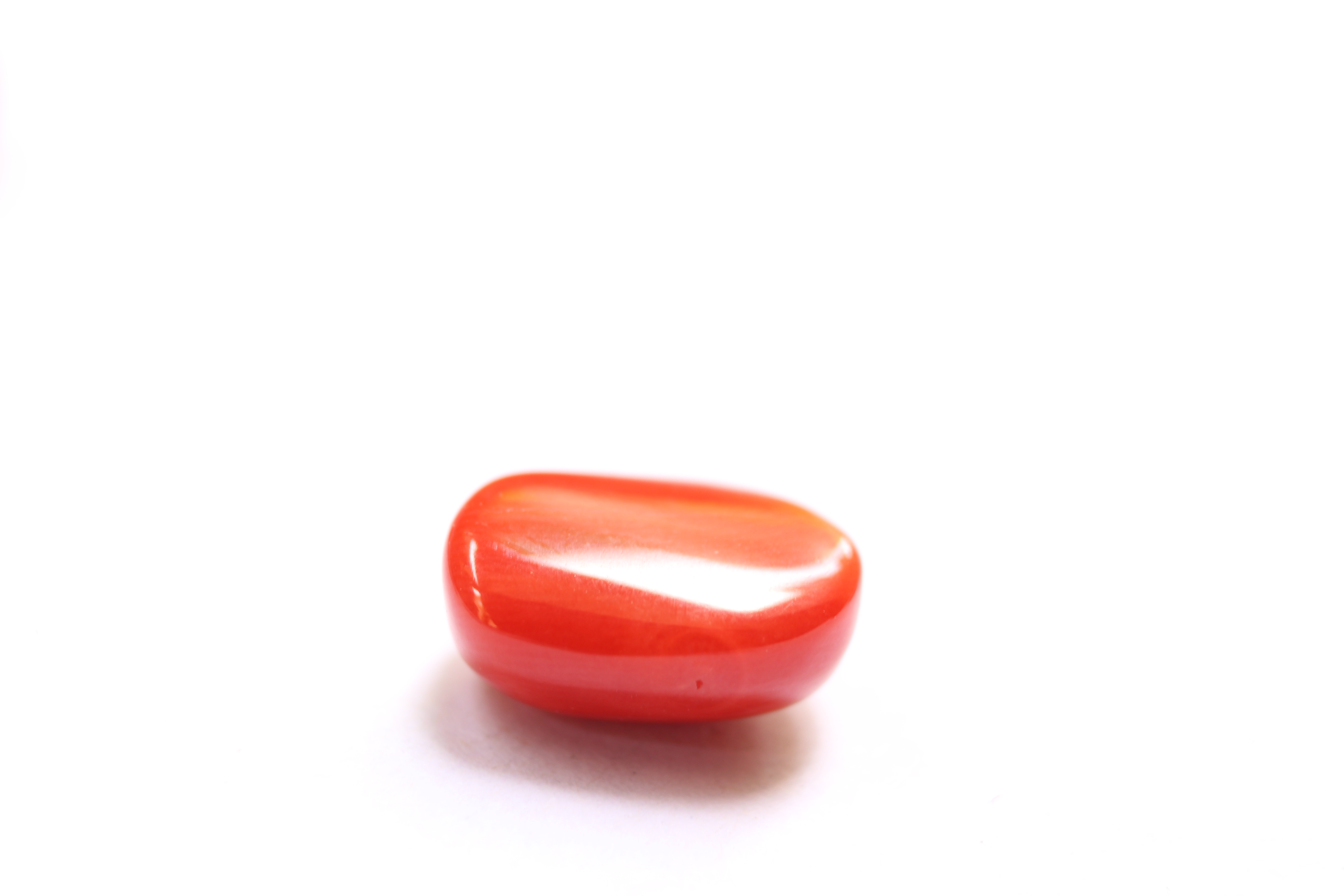
Red coral precious raw gemstone

At the beginning of the 1st millennium, there was significant trade in coral between the Mediterranean and India, where it was highly prized as a substance believed to be endowed with mysterious sacred properties. Pliny the Elder remarks that, before the great demand from India, the Gauls used it for the ornamentation of their weapons and helmets; but by this period, so great was the Eastern demand, that it was very rarely seen even in the regions which produced it. Among the Romans, branches of coral were hung around children's necks to preserve them from danger from the outside, and the substance had many medicinal virtues attributed to it. The belief in coral's potency as a charm continued throughout the Middle Ages and early in 20th century Italy, where it is known as cerasuolo, it was worn as a protection from the evil eye and by women as a cure for infertility.

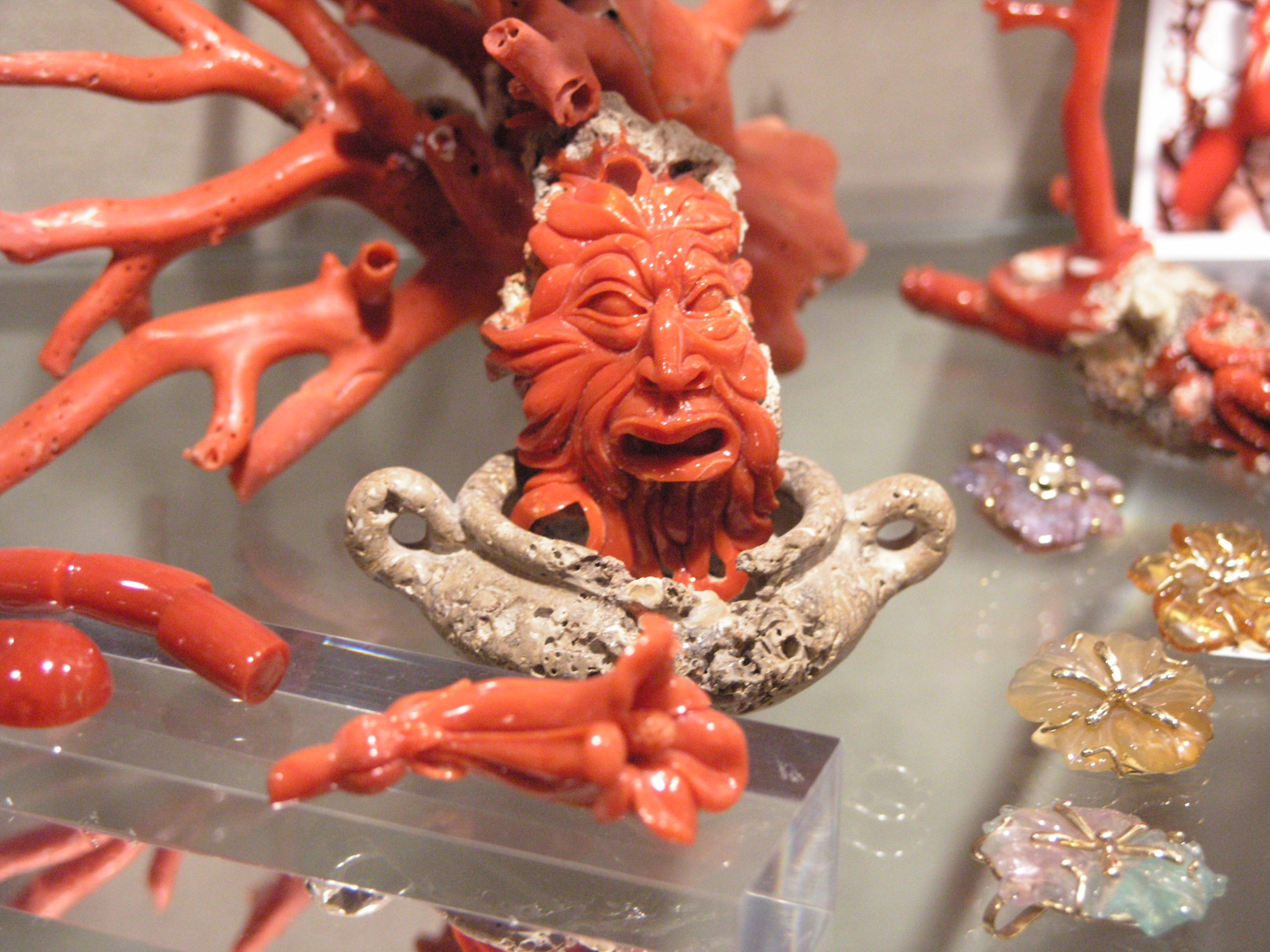
Artistic handcrafted creations of red coral in a shop in Alghero on the Coral Riviera

From the Middle Ages onward, the securing of the right to the coral fisheries off the African coasts was the object of considerable rivalry among the Mediterranean communities of Europe.

The story of the Torre del Greco is so interwoven with that of the coral so as to constitute an inseparable pair, and is documented as early as the fifteenth century. In 1790 the Royal Society of Coral was established in the town of Torre del Greco, with the idea of working and selling coral fish. This shows that the coral fishing flourished for many years in the city.

It was also enacted December 22, 1789, by Ferdinand IV of Bourbon Code coral (prepared by the Neapolitan jurist Michael Florio), with the intent to regulate the coral fishing in those years starring, in addition to the sailors Torre del Greco, the locals and those in Trapani This regulation did not have the expected success. From 1805, when he founded the first factory for the manufacturing of coral in Torre del Greco (by Paul Bartholomew Martin, but with French Genoese origin), the golden age for the manufacturing of coral in the city situated on the slopes of the Vesuvius started, because working together with the coral fishing was increasingly under the control of Torre del Greco fishermen. Since 1875, the Torre del Greco began working with the Sciacca coral and a school for the manufacturing of coral was built in 1878 in the city (which closed in 1885 to reopen in 1887), with which in 1933 established a museum of the coral. Then came the time of processing of Japanese coral found in the markets of Chennai and Kolkata.

Other story instead a short period the Tunisian fisheries were secured by Charles V for Spain; but the monopoly soon fell into the hands of the French, who held the right until the Revolutionary government in 1793 threw the trade open. For a short period (about 1806) the British government controlled the fisheries, but this later returned to the hands of the French authorities. Before the French Revolution much of the coral trade was centred in Marseille, but then largely moved to Italy, where the procuring of the raw material and the working of it was centring in Naples, Rome and Genoa.

== In culture ==
The origin of coral is explained in Greek mythology by the story of Perseus. Having petrified Cetus, the sea monster threatening Andromeda, Perseus placed Medusa's head on the riverbank while he washed his hands. When he recovered her head, he saw that her blood had turned the seaweed (in some variants the reeds) into red coral. Thus, the Greek word for coral is 'Gorgeia', as Medusa was one of the three Gorgons.

Poseidon resided in a palace made of coral and gems, and Hephaestus first crafted his work from coral.

The Romans believed coral could protect children from harm, as well as cure wounds made by snakes and scorpions and diagnose diseases by changing colour.

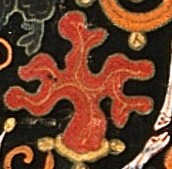
- Precious coral art in a Tibetan Thangka
  In Hindu astrology red coral is associated with the planet Mars or Graha-Mangala and used for pleasing Mars. It should be worn on the ring finger.
- A branch of red coral figures prominently in the civic coat of arms of the town of Alghero, Italy.
- Amongst the Yoruba and Bini peoples of West Africa, red precious coral jewellery (necklaces, wristlets and anklets most especially) are signifiers of high social rank, and are worn as a result by titled kings and chieftains.
- In traditional Dutch culture, notably in fishing communities, red coral necklaces were worn by the female population as an indispensable part of the traditional costumes.
- In Ladakh ornaments and accessories made of red coral and turquoise are used in festivals.

== Conservation ==
Intensive fishing, particularly in shallow waters, has damaged this species along the Mediterranean coastline, where colonies at depths of less than 50 metres are much diminished. Fishing and climate change threaten their persistence. The three oldest Mediterranean marine protected areas—Banyuls, Carry-le-Rouet and Scandola, off the island of Corsica—all host substantial populations of C. rubrum. Since protection was established, colonies have grown in size and number at shallow and deeper depths.

== See also ==
- Coral Jewellery Museum
- Black coral; also sometimes used as ornamental material
- Amber
- Pearl
