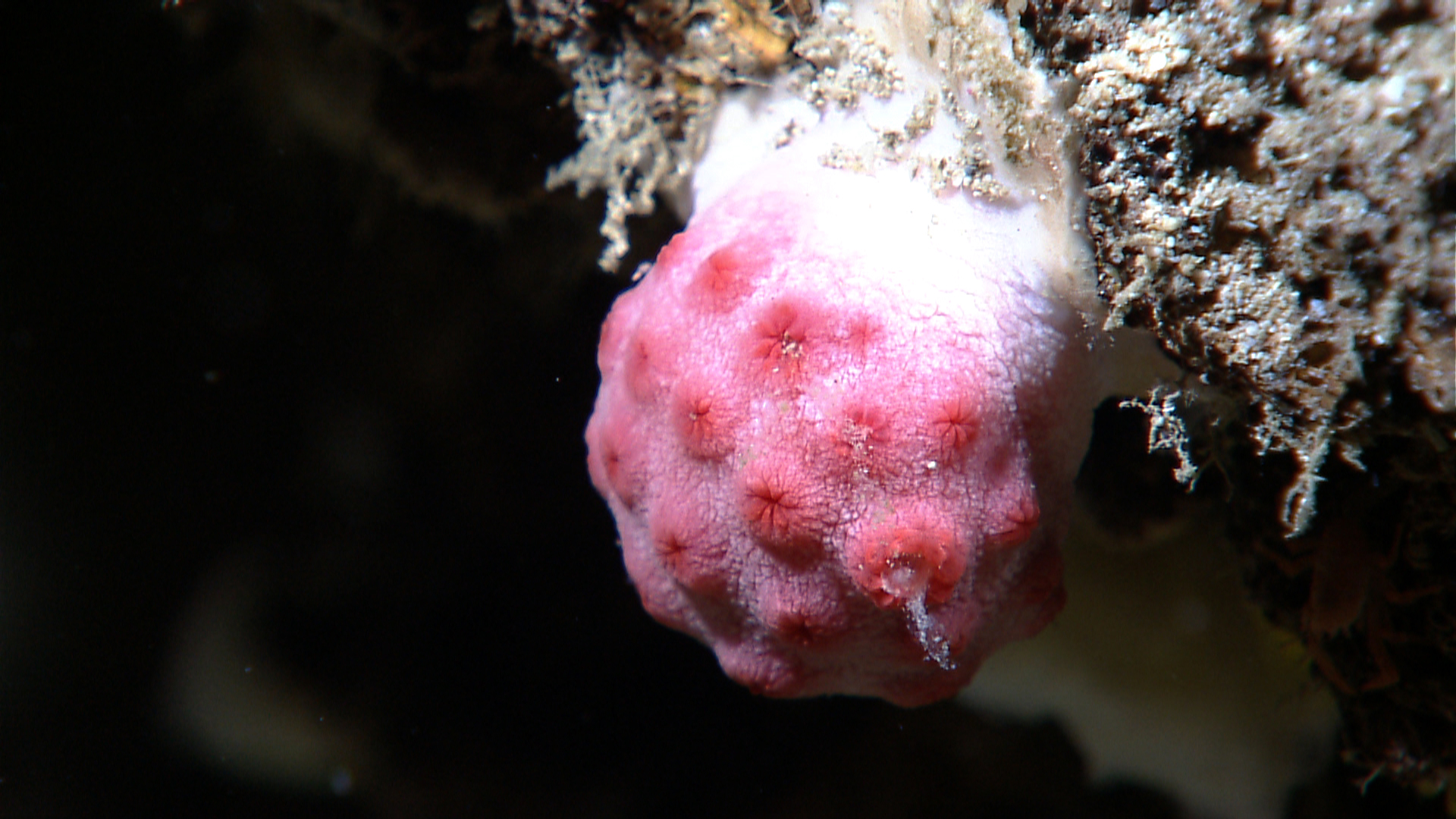
- Anthomastus species

Scientific classification
- Kingdom: Animalia
- Phylum: Cnidaria
- Subphylum: Anthozoa
- Class: Octocorallia
- Order: Malacalcyonacea
- Family: Alcyoniidae
- Genus: Anthomastus; Verrill, 1878

Species
- See text

= Anthomastus =

Genus of corals

Anthomastus is a genus of soft corals in the family Alcyoniidae.

== Species ==
Species in the genus include:

- Anthomastus aberrans (Thomson & Henderson, 1906)
- Anthomastus agaricoides (Thomson & Henderson, 1906)
- Anthomastus agaricus Studer, 1890
- Anthomastus agassizii Verrill, 1922
- Anthomastus antarcticus Kükenthal, 1910
- Anthomastus bathyproctus Bayer, 1993
- Anthomastus canariensis Wright & Studer, 1889
- Anthomastus giganteus Tixier-Durivault, 1954
- Anthomastus globosus d'Hondt, 1992
- Anthomastus grandiflorus Verrill, 1878
- Anthomastus granulosus Kükenthal, 1910
- Anthomastus gyratus Molodtsova, 2013
- Anthomastus hicksoni Bock, 1938
- Anthomastus muscarioides Kükenthal, 1910
- Anthomastus purpureus (Koren & Danielssen, 1883)
- Anthomastus rylovi Naumov, 1952
- Anthomastus tahinodus d'Hondt, 1988
- Anthomastus zealandicus Benham, 1928
- Anthomastus ritteri (Cordes, Nybakken, et.al, 2001)
