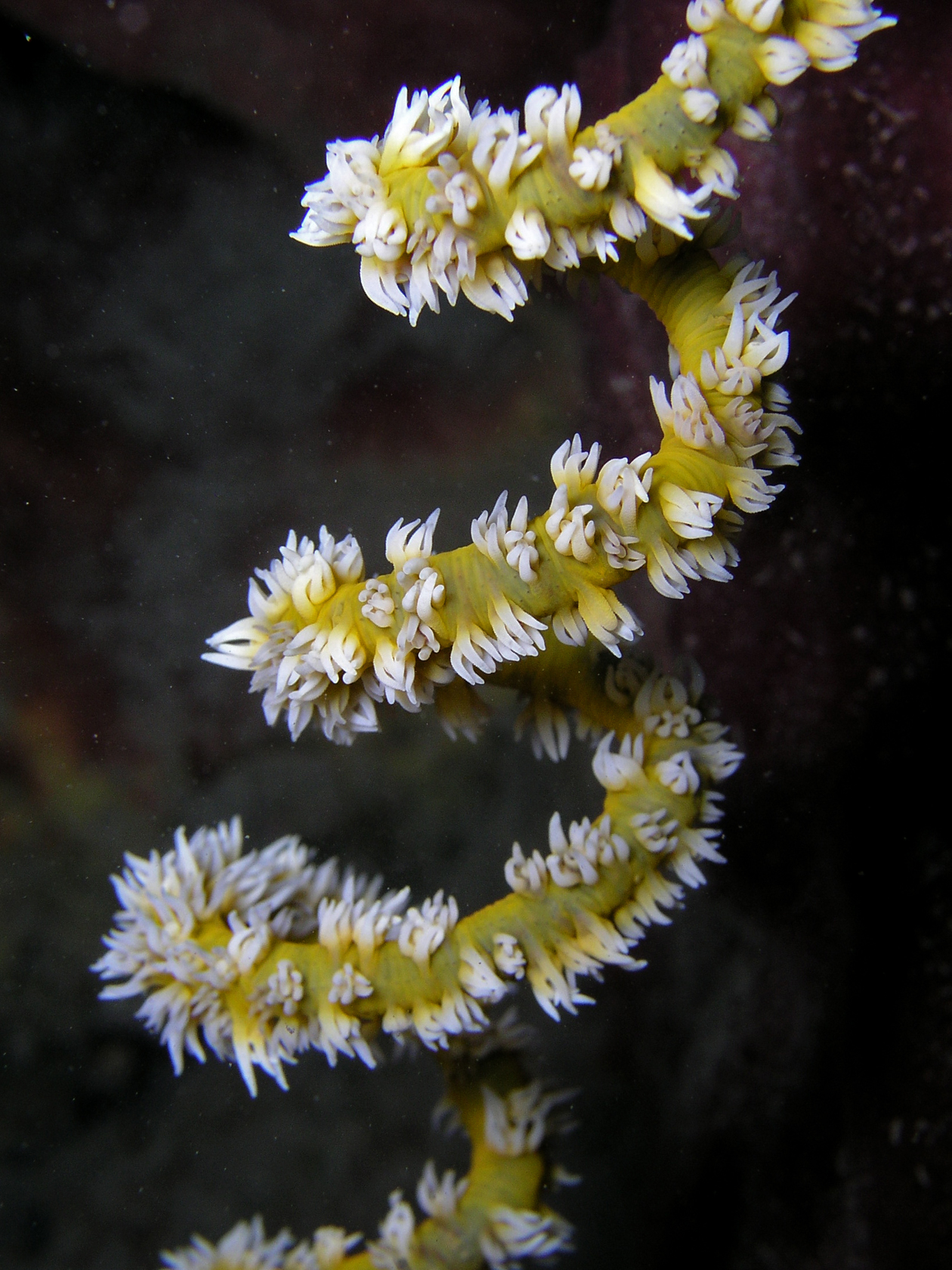
- Cirrhipathes spiralis

Scientific classification
- Domain: Eukaryota
- Kingdom: Animalia
- Phylum: Cnidaria
- Class: Hexacorallia
- Order: Antipatharia
- Family: Antipathidae
- Genus: Cirrhipathes de Blainville, 1830

Species
- Cirrhipathes anguina; Cirrhipathes contorta; Cirrhipathes densiflora; Cirrhipathes diversa; Cirrhipathes gardineri; Cirrhipathes hainanensis; Cirrhipathes indica; Cirrhipathes musculosa; Cirrhipathes nana; Cirrhipathes propinqua; Cirrhipathes rumphii; Cirrhipathes secchini; Cirrhipathes sinensis; Cirrhipathes spiralis; Cirrhipathes translucens

Synonyms
- Cirripathes de Blainville, 1830 [lapsus]

= Cirrhipathes =

Genus of corals

Cirrhipathes is a genus of black coral from the family Antipathidae. Coral species in this genus are commonly known as whip or wire corals because they often exhibit a twisted or coiled morphology. In addition to their colorful appearance, with colors ranging from yellow to red passing through blue and green, these species possess a dark skeleton that is characteristic to every black coral.

== Distribution ==
Commonly found in tropical and subtropical areas, these corals are part of the reefs in the Indian and Pacific oceans, sometimes as shallow as 15 metres (49 ft) but often at depths greater than 50 metres (160 ft). Long and unbranched, Cirrhipathes species are attached to coral reefs.

== Description ==
Like all corals, Cirrhipathes species are made of and covered by polyps. These polyps are responsible for providing defense and feeding mechanisms in the form of stinging structures known as nematocysts. These structures, which are present in their tentacles, are fired at preys or predators. The characteristic barbed-wire-like appearance of Cirrhipathes species is the result of their inability to completely retract their polyps. They can grow up to more than three meters in length.

Corals in this genus have different ways of obtaining nutrients. While some species obtain nutrients from their mutualistic interaction with photosynthetic zooxanthellae, others obtain their food by simply capturing small floating animals with their tentacles. When kept in aquariums, wire corals being carnivorous organisms should be fed on small, meaty items such as baby brine, rotifers, cyclop-eeze, fish eggs, and other zooplankton feeds.

From their interaction with the zooxanthellae, the Cirrhipathes obtain essential molecules and in return, protection and access to sunlight are provided to the zooxanthellae. Furthermore, important habitats that house numerous species of marine organisms are formed by these corals. It is even believed that the survival of two species of shrimp depends entirely on these corals.
