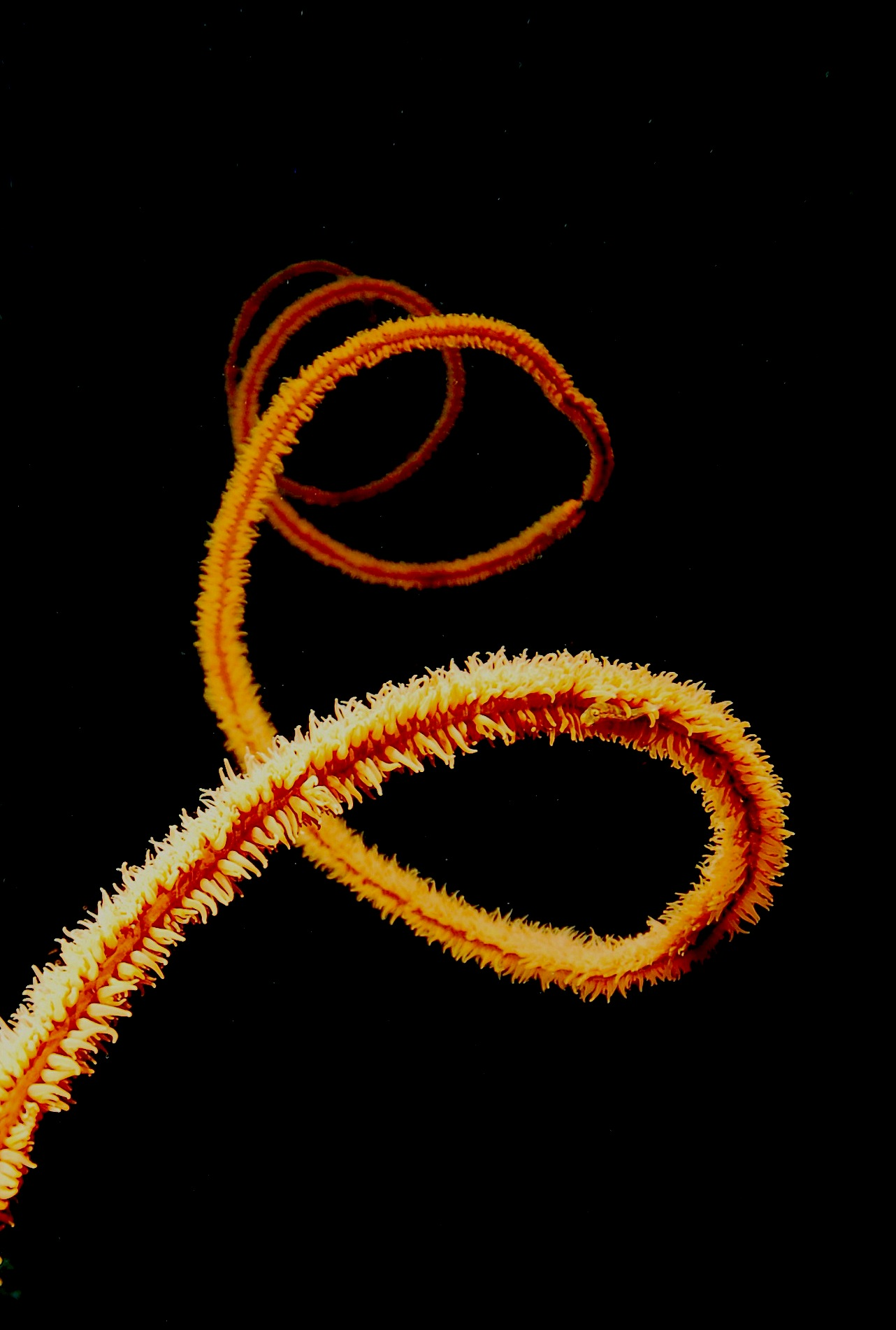
- Cirrhipathes sp.

Scientific classification
- Kingdom: Animalia
- Phylum: Cnidaria
- Subphylum: Anthozoa
- Class: Hexacorallia
- Order: Antipatharia
- Family: Antipathidae; Ehrenberg, 1834

= Antipathidae =

Family of corals

Antipathidae is a family of corals in the order Antipatharia, commonly known as black corals. They are generally considered a deep-water taxon; however, some of the most diverse communities are known from tropical shallow waters.

== Taxonomy ==
This family contains the following genera according to the World Register of Marine Species:

- Allopathes Opresko & Cairns, 1994 -- 3 species
- Antipathes Pallas, 1766 -- 66 species
- Cirrhipathes de Blainville, 1830 -- 16 species
- Hillopathes van Pesch, 1914 -- 1 species
- Pseudocirrhipathes Bo & al., 2009 -- 1 species
- Pteropathes Brook, 1889 -- 1 species
- Stichopathes Brook, 1889 -- 34 species
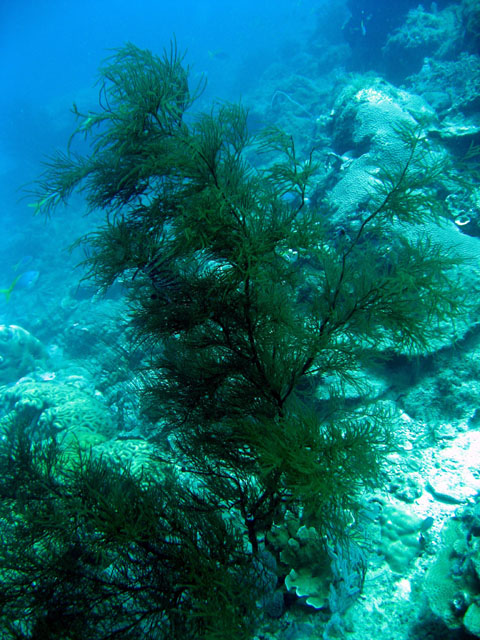
Antipathes dichotoma

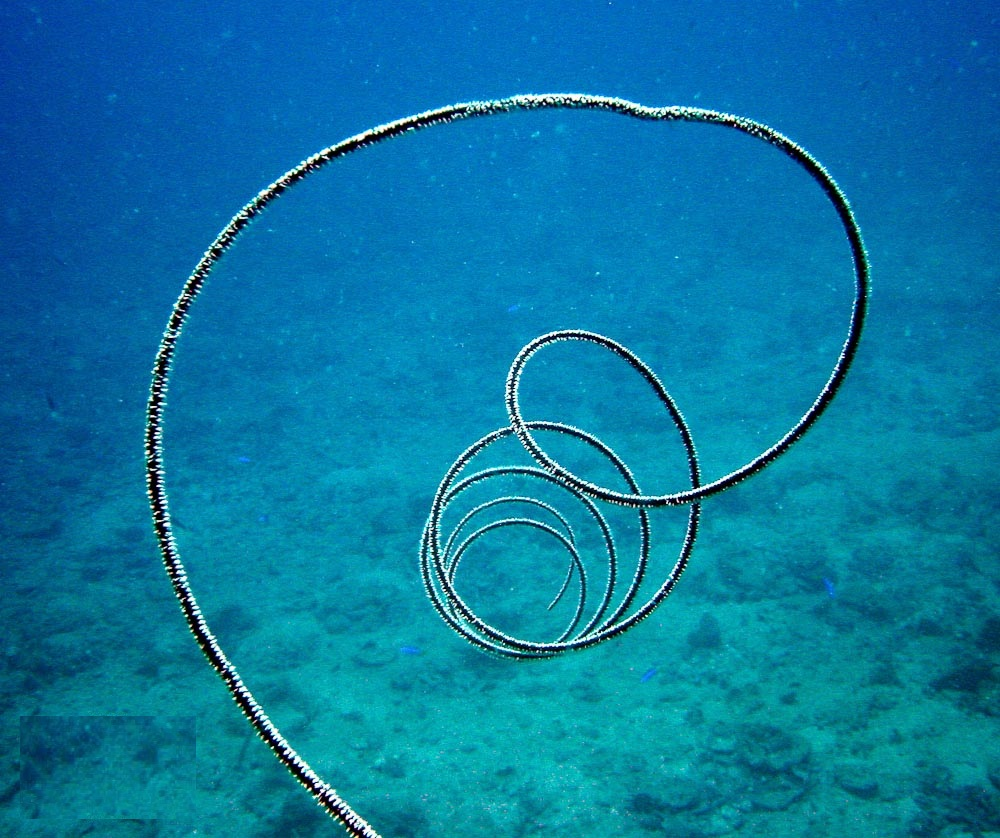
Cirrhipathes sp.

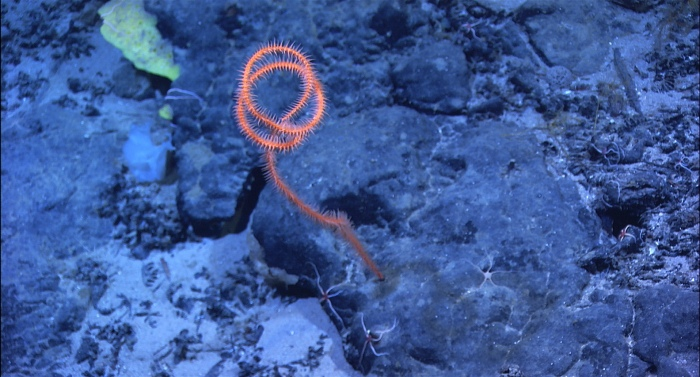
Stichopathes sp.

== Bibliography ==
- Opresko, Dennis. "Spotlight on Antipatharians (Black Corals)". NMNH.typepad.com.
- TERRANA, LUCAS, et al. “Shallow-Water Black Corals (Cnidaria: Anthozoa: Hexacorallia: Antipatharia) from SW Madagascar.” Zootaxa, vol. 4826, no. 1, 2020, https://doi.org/10.11646/zootaxa.4826.1.1.
