= Tritoniella =

Scientific classification
- Kingdom: Animalia
- Phylum: Mollusca
- Class: Gastropoda
- Order: Nudibranchia
- Suborder: Tritoniacea
- Family: Tritoniidae
- Genus: Tritoniella; Eliot, 1907

Type species
- Tritoniella belli Eliot, 1907

Species
- T. belli Eliot, 1907; T. gnathodentata Schächinger, Schrödl, N. G. Wilson & Moles, 2022; T. gnocchi Schächinger, Schrödl, N. G. Wilson & Moles, 2022; T. heideae Schächinger, Schrödl, N. G. Wilson & Moles, 2022; T. prinzess Schächinger, Schrödl, N. G. Wilson & Moles, 2022; T. schoriesi Schächinger, Schrödl, N. G. Wilson & Moles, 2022

Genus of gastropods

Tritoniella is a genus of sea slugs, specifically dendronotid nudibranchs. It is a marine gastropod mollusc in the family Tritoniidae.The genus was described in 1907 by the British diplomat and malacologist Charles Eliot.

== Description ==
Tritoniella can be differentiated from Tritonia (the only other Tritoniidae sharing its distribution range) by a wide dorsal ridge and lack of foliaceous tufts (gills).

It can grow to a length of up to 8 cm (3 in). Most individuals have a ridge running along the middle of the back. The colour is variable, ranging from a translucent milky white to yellow or orange.

== Distribution ==
Tritoniella can be found in the Southern Ocean around the coast of Antarctica and along the Scotia Arc up north to Burdwood Bank south of the Falkland Islands at depths between 5 m (20 ft) and 751 m (2,500 ft).

== Ecology ==
Tritoniella feeds mainly on soft corals, but may also feed on hydroids and sea anemones.

Tritoniella belli incorporates the chimyl alcohol ingested from Clavularia frankliniana into its tissue to use it as a chemical defence to make itself upalatable against predators.

It is avoided by the predatory starfishes Odontaster validus, Perknaster fuscus and Acodontaster conspicuus because the mucus it extrudes is distasteful; it is preyed on by the sea anemone Isotealia antarctica, but 70% of the encounters between the two result in the nudibranch escaping, or the sea anemone swallowing the nudibranch but then regurgitating it from its gastrovascular cavity. The gelatinous egg ribbons of the nudibranch are also eaten by I. antarctica but rejected by O. validus.
