= Clavularia frankliniana =

Scientific classification
- Kingdom: Animalia
- Phylum: Cnidaria
- Subphylum: Anthozoa
- Class: Octocorallia
- Order: Malacalcyonacea
- Family: Clavulariidae
- Genus: Clavularia
- Species: C. frankliniana

Binomial name
- Clavularia frankliniana Roule, 1902

Species of coral

Clavularia frankliniana is a species of colonial soft coral in the family Clavulariidae. It is found in the southern Atlantic Ocean and the waters around Antarctica. It was first described in 1902 by the French zoologist Louis Roule.

== Description ==
Clavularia frankliniana is a stoloniferous soft coral. It forms small colonies of polyps with eight tentacles which are up to 1 cm (0.4 in) high and are usually white.

== Distribution and habitat ==
Clavularia frankliniana is native to the Antarctic Peninsula, the coasts of the Antarctic continent and the nearby island groups. It occurs at depths down to about 600 m (2,000 ft) and grows on rocks or other hard substrates.

== Ecology ==
This coral contains the chemical unpalatable chimyl alcohol for defensive purposes. This is insufficient to prevent the nudibranch Tritoniella belli from feeding on it, and the nudibranch incorporates the substance into its own tissues, making it distasteful to predatory starfish such as Odontaster validus, Perknaster fuscus and Acodontaster conspicuus. Reproduction in this coral can occur at any time of year and is by fission or by sexual reproduction, with the release of larvae.
