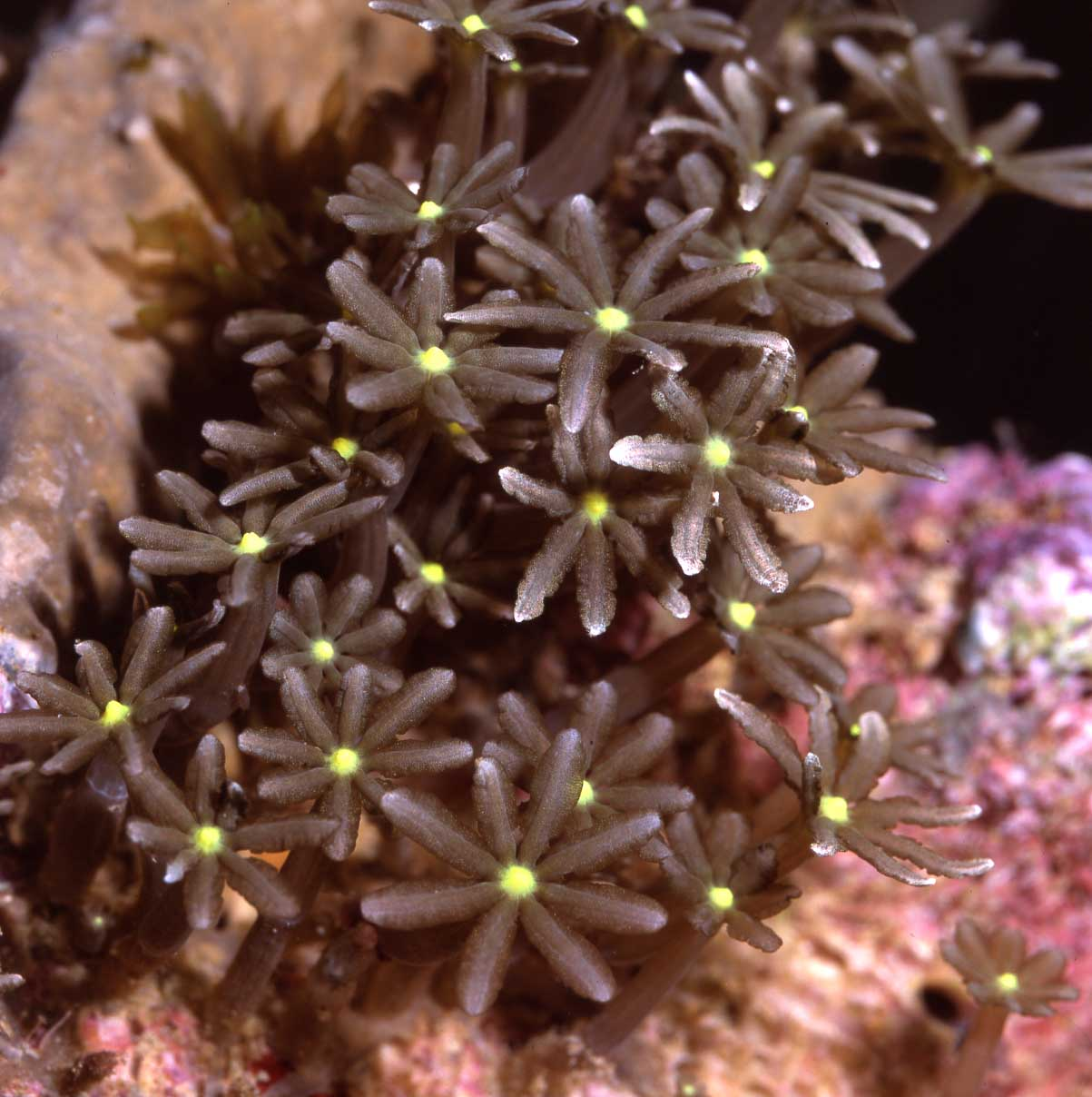
- Knopia octocontacanalis

Scientific classification
- Kingdom: Animalia
- Phylum: Cnidaria
- Subphylum: Anthozoa
- Class: Octocorallia
- Order: Alcyonacea
- Suborder: Stolonifera; Hickson, 1883

Families
- See text

= Stolonifera =

Suborder of soft corals in the order Alcyonacea

Stolonifera is a suborder of soft corals in the order Alcyonacea. Members of this taxon are characterised by having separate polyps budding off an encrusting horizontal, branching stolon. The skeletons include spicules or consists of a horny external cuticle. These soft corals are found in shallow tropical and temperate seas.

== Families ==
According to the World Register of Marine Species, the following families are included in this suborder:

- Acrossotidae
- Arulidae
- Clavulariidae
- Coelogorgiidae
- Cornulariidae
- Pseudogorgiidae
- Tubiporidae
