= C. elegantissima =

C. elegantissima may refer to:

- Cladiella elegantissima, a species of corals
- Chithramia elegantissima, a species of fungus
- Clione elegantissima, a species of gastropods
