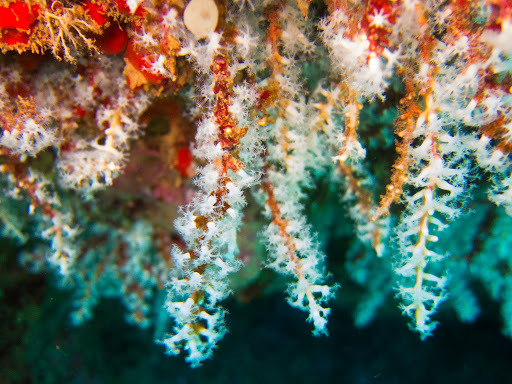

Scientific classification
- Kingdom: Animalia
- Phylum: Cnidaria
- Subphylum: Anthozoa
- Class: Octocorallia
- Order: Malacalcyonacea
- Family: Clavulariidae
- Genus: Carijoa
- Species: C. riisei

Binomial name
- Carijoa riisei (Duchassaing & Michelotti, 1860)

Synonyms
- List: Carijoa rupicola Müller, 1867; Carijoa rusei (Duchassaing & Michelotti, 1860); Clavularia riisei Duchassaing & Michelotti, 1860; Clavularia rusei Duchassaing & Michelotti, 1860; Paratelesto riisei; Telesto africana Verrill, 1870; Telesto riisei (Duchassaing & Michelotti, 1860); Telesto rupicola (F. Müller, 1867); Telesto rusei (Duchassaing & Michelotti, 1860)

= Carijoa riisei =

Species of coral

Carijoa riisei, the snowflake coral or branched pipe coral, is a species of soft coral in the family Clavulariidae. It was originally thought to have been native to the tropical western Atlantic Ocean and subsequently spread to other areas of the world such as Hawaii and the greater tropical Pacific, where it is regarded as an invasive species. The notion that it is native to the tropical western Atlantic was perpetuated from the fact that the type specimen, described by Duchassaing & Michelotti in 1860, was collected from the US Virgin Islands. It has subsequently been shown through molecular evidence that it is more likely that the species is in fact native to the Indo-Pacific and subsequently spread to the western tropical Atlantic most likely as a hull fouling species prior to its original description.

== Description ==
Carijoa riisei is a colonial soft coral with a tangled, bushy growth form. It has hollow branches that may be 30 cm (12 in) long, growing from a creeping stolon. The branches grow by budding off the stolon and have eight longitudinal furrows and a prominent polyp at the tip. The calyces in which the polyps sit are tubular, widely separated on the branches, 3 to 5 mm (1/8 to 3/16 in) long and 1.5 mm (1/16 in) wide. The polyps are retractible into the branches.

== Distribution and habitat ==
Carijoa riisei was originally thought to be native to the tropical and semi-tropical western Atlantic Ocean, the Caribbean Sea and the Gulf of Mexico. Its range extends from South Carolina to Brazil. It is now thought to be invasive throughout its entire range in the western Atlantic Ocean. It has been found to be globally distributed and is found widely associated with shipping ports where maritime traffic is high. It was first detected in Hawaii in 1972 when it appeared in Pearl Harbor. Since then it has spread to the other islands in the archipelago. It has also been detected on many other islands in the Indo-Pacific, and on the coasts of Australia and Asia.

The first report in Ecuador was in 2010, in Machalilla National Park, then in 2011 in the Galera San Francisco Marine Reserve in Esmeraldas Province, 2012 in El Islote Los Ahorcados in Manabí Province and El Pelado Marine Reserve, and 2013 in a few more coastal locations and one further from shore. C. riisei tends to smother other corals with the exception of another Indo-Pacific invasive, Tubastraea coccinea. As of 2020 there are 22 known colonies on the coast of Ecuador, the largest being in Manabí, in Jama. There are several uninvaded areas along the coast which are suitable, but by chance have not been colonized yet.

It is a shade-loving species and grows on hard surfaces away from direct sunlight. These include caves, overhangs, ledges and under piers. It is a common hull fouling organism and will grow on metal, wood, concrete, plastic and rope. It thrives in turbid water with moderate to strong currents or wave action.

== Biology ==
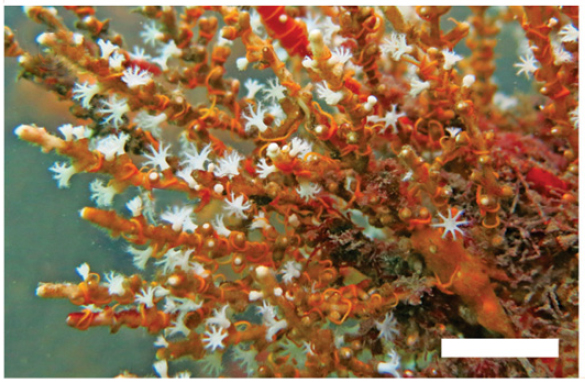
Ophiothela mirabilis growing on C. riisei

Carijoa riisei is an azooxanthellate species. This means that its tissues do not contain the symbiotic single-celled protists known as zooxanthellae to provide it with energy, as most species of coral do. Instead it needs to catch all its food by extending its polyps and expanding its tentacles. It thrives in turbid waters with moderate to strong movement which brings plenty of zooplankton and other food particles within its reach on which to filter feed.

Individual colonies of C. riisei are either male or female. Gametes are liberated into the sea at any time of year, a strategy unusual among corals which mostly synchronise spawning with the phases of the moon. The eggs tend to sink which may mean the larvae are benthic rather than planktonic.

== Invasiveness ==
In Hawaii, at depths below about 75 m (246 ft), the invasive Carijoa riisei overgrows and kills the native black corals Antipathes dichotoma and Antipathes grandis. These are slow-growing stony corals with black skeletons, which are used for the manufacture of jewelry and are the subject of a managed fishery. The ecological balance is disturbed as the black corals are smothered by the faster growing octocoral and fail to reach a reproductive age (twelve years). The rapid spread of C. riisei in Hawaii may have been facilitated by the relative scarcity of native octocorals, a group that dominates many reef systems in the Caribbean and the Indo-West Pacific.

The nudibranch Phyllodesmium poindimiei feeds on C. riisei, but it cannot be used in Hawaii as a biocontrol because, even under ideal conditions, the octocoral can grow faster than the nudibranch can destroy its tissues. The only other predators so far identified are the nudibranch Tritoniopsis elegans and the bearded fireworm Hermodice carunculata.
