= Cyathopodium elegans =

Scientific classification
- Kingdom: Animalia
- Phylum: Cnidaria
- Subphylum: Anthozoa
- Class: Octocorallia
- Order: Alcyonacea
- Family: Clavulariidae
- Genus: Cyathopodium
- Species: C. elegans

Binomial name
- Cyathopodium elegans Deichmann, 1936

Species of coral

Cyathopodium elegans is a species of soft corals in the family Clavulariidae. It is found in the western part of the Atlantic Ocean.
