= Tritoniopsis =

Tritoniopsis is the scientific name of two genera of organisms and may refer to:

- Tritoniopsis (gastropod), a genus of molluscs in the family Tritoniidae
- Tritoniopsis (plant), a genus of plants in the family Iridaceae
