= Cladiella krempfi =

Scientific classification
- Kingdom: Animalia
- Phylum: Cnidaria
- Subphylum: Anthozoa
- Class: Octocorallia
- Order: Malacalcyonacea
- Family: Cladiellidae
- Genus: Cladiella
- Species: C. krempfi

Binomial name
- Cladiella krempfi (Hickson, 1919)

Species of soft coral

Cladiella krempfi is a species of soft coral in the family Cladiellidae. It occurs in the western Indo-Pacific region and was first described by the British zoologist Sydney John Hickson in 1919.

== Secondary metabolites ==
Four unusual diterpene compounds with novel pyran rings have been identified from this coral. These polyoxygenated diterpenoids also accumulate in the tissues of the nudibranch Tritoniopsis elegans, which feeds on Cladiella krempfi.
