= Gnathodon =

Gnathodon may refer to:

- Golden trevally (Gnathanodon speciosus) named by Peter Forsskål in 1775

as well as the synonyms

- Odontaster a genus of seastars has the junior synonym of Gnathodon coined by Verrill in 1899
- Rangia a genus of bivalves which has the junior synonym of Gnathodon coined by Desmoulins in 1832
- Tooth-billed pigeon which was called Gnathodon strigirostris by Jardine, in 1845
