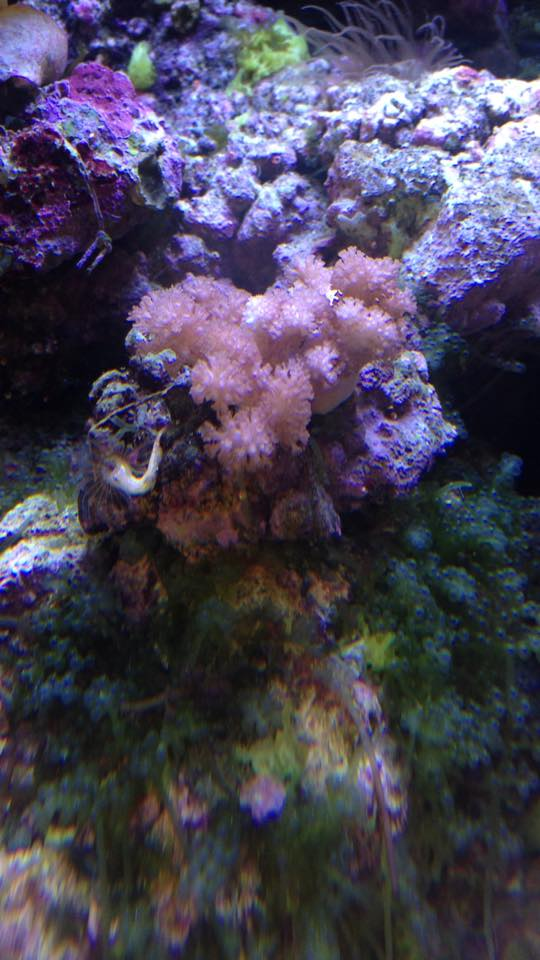

Scientific classification
- Kingdom: Animalia
- Phylum: Cnidaria
- Subphylum: Anthozoa
- Class: Octocorallia
- Order: Malacalcyonacea
- Family: Cladiellidae
- Genus: Klyxum; Alderslade, 2000

= Klyxum =

Genus of corals

Klyxum is a genus of animals in the family Cladiellidae. They are commonly called cauliflower colt coral, or simply colt coral. These common names can also refer to the related genus Cladiella.

== Range ==
Klyxum species are widespread throughout the tropical Indo-Pacific.

== Species ==
There are sixteen species currently classified in this genus.

- Klyxum abrolhosum (Thorpe, 1928)
- Klyxum adii Benayahu & Perkol-Finke, 2010
- Klyxum brochi (Thorpe, 1928)
- Klyxum confertum (Kükenthal, 1903)
- Klyxum echinatum (Tixier-Durivault, 1970)
- Klyxum equisetiform (Luttschwager, 1922)
- Klyxum flaccidum (Tixier-Durivault, 1966)
- Klyxum legitimum (Tixier-Durivault, 1970)
- Klyxum molle (Thomson & Dean, 1931)
- Klyxum okinawanum (Utinomi, 1976)
- Klyxum rotundum (Thomson & Dean, 1931)
- Klyxum simplex (Thomson & Dean, 1931)
- Klyxum tuberculosa (Tixier-Durivault, 1970)
- Klyxum utinomii (Verseveldt, 1971)
- Klyxum viscidum (Utinomi, 1954)
- Klyxum whitei (Thorpe, 1928)
