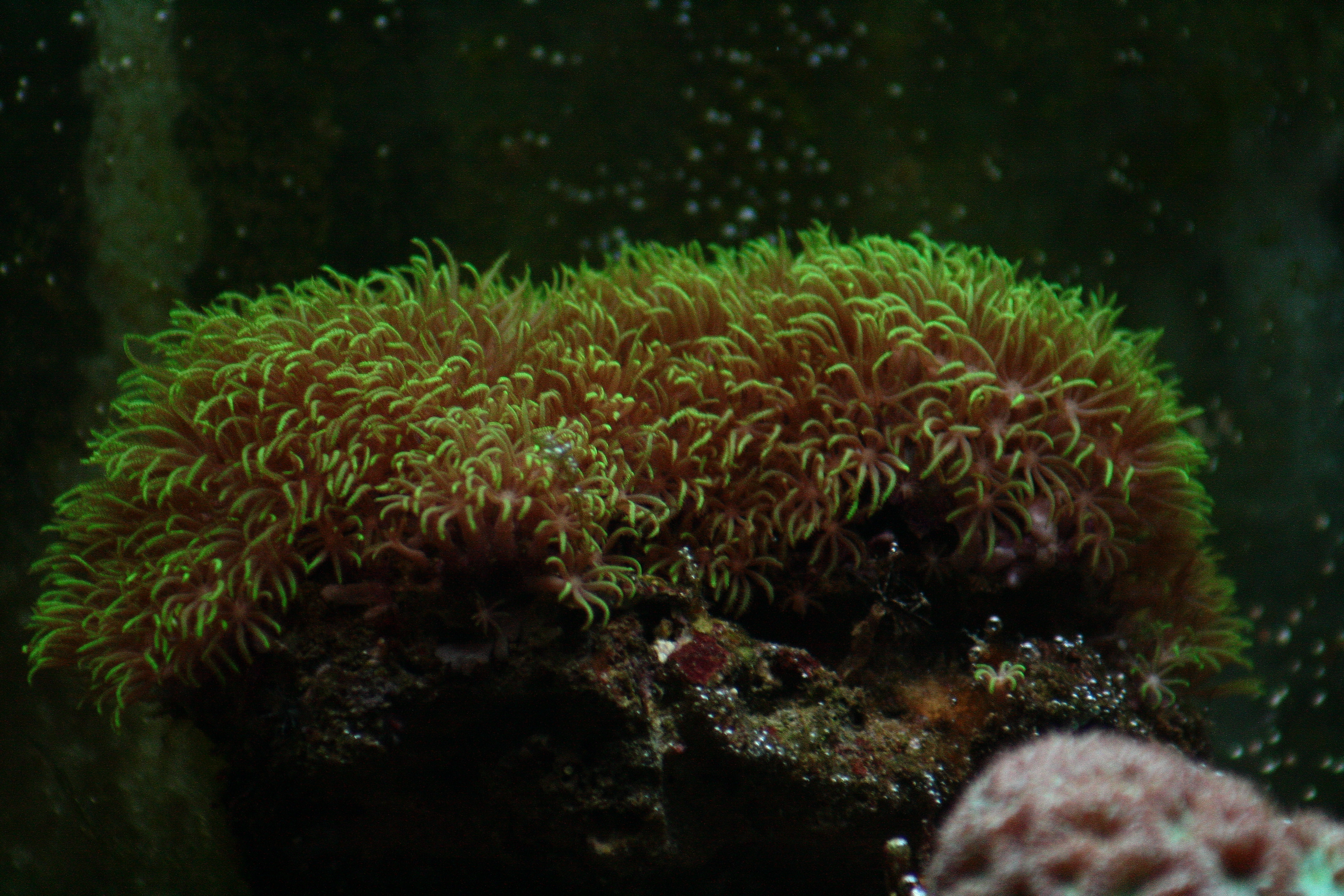

Scientific classification
- Kingdom: Animalia
- Phylum: Cnidaria
- Subphylum: Anthozoa
- Class: Octocorallia
- Order: Alcyonacea
- Family: Clavulariidae
- Genus: Clavularia
- Species: C. viridis

Binomial name
- Clavularia viridis (Quoy & Gaimard, 1833)

= Clavularia viridis =

Species of coral

Clavularia viridis is a species of colonial soft coral in the family Clavulariidae. It is found in shallow waters in the tropical Indo-Pacific.

== Description ==
The polyps grow from basal stolons which form a purple mat encrusting the substrate. The eight tentacles have feathery margins. They are retractable and fluorescent green, usually with a band of white or yellow around the margin of the oral disc. The polyps are large, compared with related species, and may reach 5 cm (2 in) in diameter.

== Distribution ==
Clavularia viridis is native to the tropical Indo-Pacific. It occurs at depths down to about 19 m (62 ft) and usually colonises other species of coral.

== Biology ==
The tissues of this octocoral contain symbiotic unicellular protists known as zooxanthellae. These use photosynthesis to synthesize carbohydrates and the octocoral gets much of its nutrition from this source. It also spreads its tentacles to catch zooplankton floating past, and can extract organic matter from the sea water.

Reproduction takes place in November when all the colonies in the area liberate gametes into the sea between 22 and 24 days after the full moon.

== Secondary metabolites ==
A number of secondary metabolites have been isolated from this octocoral and two norcarotenoids showing cell growth-inhibitory activity were isolated from its symbiotic zooxanthellae.
