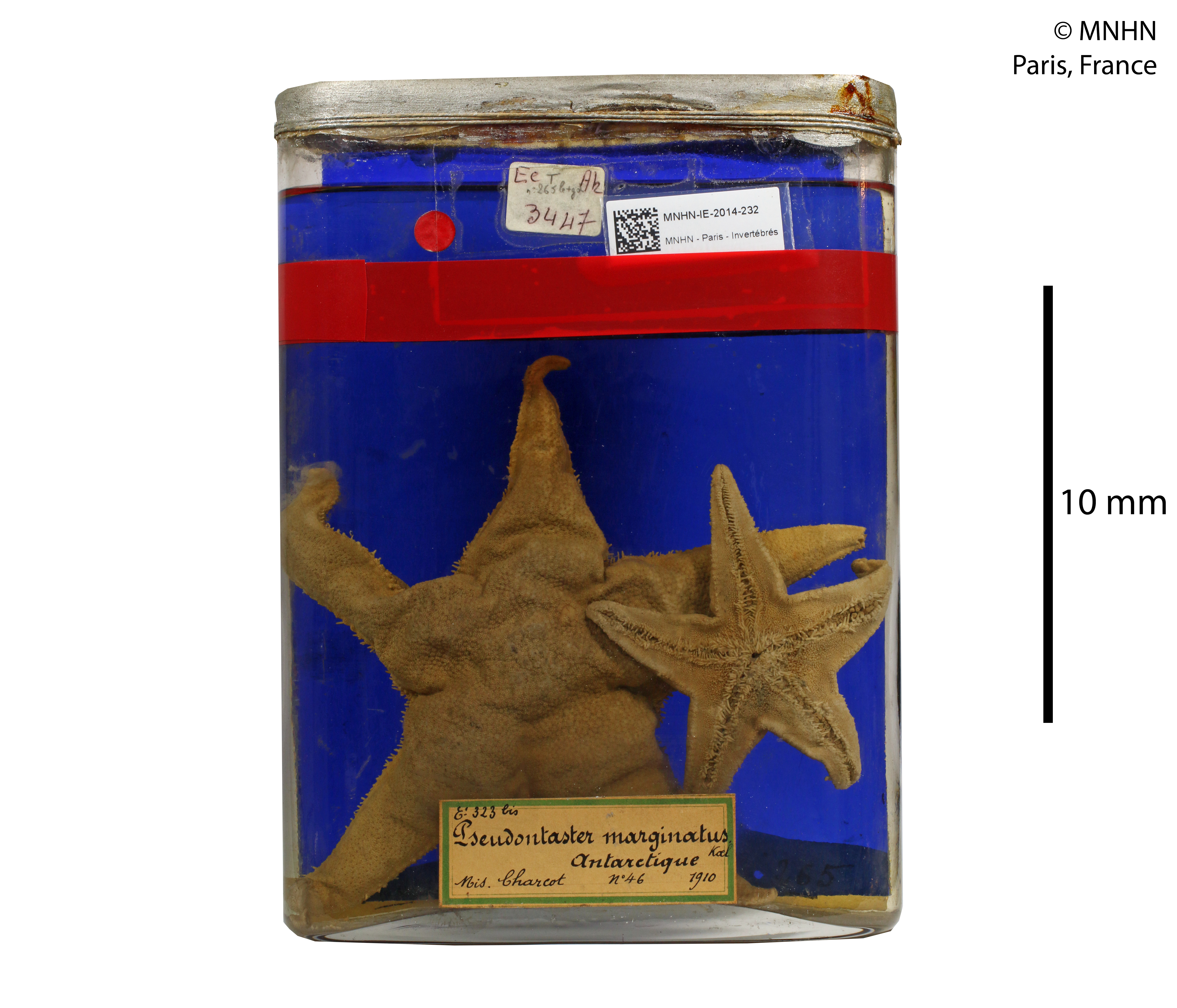

Scientific classification
- Kingdom: Animalia
- Phylum: Echinodermata
- Class: Asteroidea
- Order: Valvatida
- Family: Odontasteridae
- Genus: Acodontaster; Verrill, 1899

Species
- See text.

Synonyms
- Heuresaster Bell, 1908; Metadontaster Koehler, 1920; Pseudontaster Koehler, 1912; Tridontaster Koehler, 1920

= Acodontaster =

Genus of starfishes

Acodontaster is a genus of starfish in the family Odontasteridae. Members of the genus are found in the Southern Ocean, in the waters off Antarctica and the island groups nearby. Acodontaster elongatus is additionally found further north in the Atlantic Ocean on the eastern seaboard of South America.

== Species ==
The following species are listed in the World Register of Marine Species:

- Acodontaster capitatus (Koehler, 1912)
- Acodontaster conspicuus (Koehler, 1920)
- Acodontaster elongatus (Sladen, 1889)
- Acodontaster hodgsoni (Bell, 1908)
- Acodontaster marginatus (Koehler, 1912)
