= Isotealia dubia =

Scientific classification
- Kingdom: Animalia
- Phylum: Cnidaria
- Subphylum: Anthozoa
- Class: Hexacorallia
- Order: Actiniaria
- Family: Actiniidae
- Genus: Isotealia
- Species: I. dubia

Binomial name
- Isotealia dubia (Wassilieff, 1908)

Synonyms
- Leiotealia dubia Wassilieff, 1908

Species of sea anemone

Isotealia dubia is a species of sea anemone in the family Actiniidae. It is found in the North Pacific Ocean.
