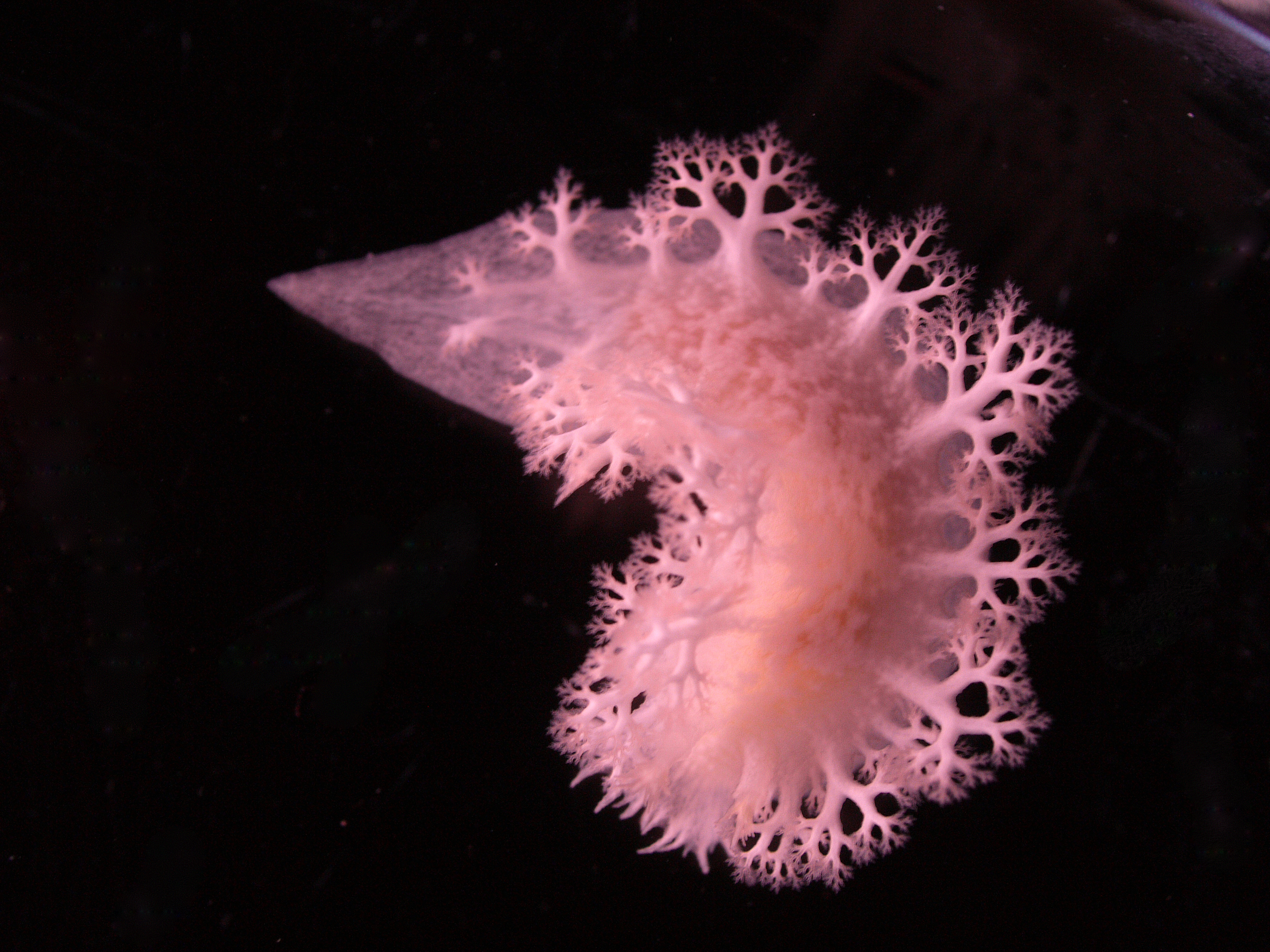

Scientific classification
- Kingdom: Animalia
- Phylum: Mollusca
- Class: Gastropoda
- Order: Nudibranchia
- Suborder: Tritoniacea
- Family: Tritoniidae
- Genus: Tritoniopsis
- Species: T. elegans

Binomial name
- Tritoniopsis elegans (Audouin in Savigny, 1826)

Synonyms
- Tritonia elegans Audouin in Savigny, 1826; Marionia elegans; Tritoniopsilla elegans (Audouin, 1826); Tritonia glama Rüppell & Leuckart, 1831; Tritonia glauca (Rüppell & Leuckart, 1831 for 1828); Tritoniopsis gravieri Vayssière, 1912

= Tritoniopsis elegans =

Species of gastropod

Tritoniopsis elegans is a species of dendronotid nudibranch. It is a marine gastropod mollusc in the family Tritoniidae and is found in the western Indo-Pacific. It was first described by the French naturalist Jean Victoire Audouin in 1826, the type specimen being found in the Red Sea.

== Description ==
Tritoniopsis elegans is a slender nudibranch growing to about 5 cm (2 in), with several pairs of dendritic (branching) cerata and rhinophores tipped with short tentacles. It varies in colour from translucent clear to translucent orange or orange-red and has a pattern of white opaque markings. The different colour forms do not seem to be a result of the animals' diet because the two forms sometimes occur alongside each other when the animals are feeding on the same colonial soft coral. The white form used to be known as Tritoniopsilla alba but this is now considered to be a synonym for T. elegans.

== Distribution and habitat ==
Tritoniopsis elegans was described from the Red Sea. It has been reported from many localities in the western Indo-Pacific. It is known from the Red Sea, Tanzania, Japan, New Caledonia and eastern Australia. It is found on shallow water reefs, normally on the soft corals on which it feeds, but it is nocturnal and so is easily overlooked. In 2007, T. elegans was observed in Hawaii for the first time, having not been included in any previous surveys of marine invertebrates on the islands.

== Ecology ==
Tritoniopsis elegans is one of the only predators to feed on the invasive octocoral Carijoa riisei. The only other known predators on this coral are the aeolid nudibranch Phyllodesmium poindimiei and the bearded fireworm Hermodice carunculata.

Tritoniopsis elegans also feeds on the Chinese octocoral Cladiella krempfi, and it has been found that the unusual diterpenes present in that coral accumulate in the nudibranch's mantle.
