= Cyathopodium =

Scientific classification
- Domain: Eukaryota
- Kingdom: Animalia
- Phylum: Cnidaria
- Class: Octocorallia
- Order: Alcyonacea
- Family: Clavulariidae
- Genus: Cyathopodium; Verrill, 1868

Species
- Cyathopodium elegans Deichmann, 1936; Cyathopodium ingolfi Madsen, 1944; Cyathopodium tenue (Dana, 1846)

Genus of corals

Cyathopodium is a genus of soft corals in the family Clavulariidae.
