= Tritoniella gnathodentata =

Scientific classification
- Kingdom: Animalia
- Phylum: Mollusca
- Class: Gastropoda
- Order: Nudibranchia
- Suborder: Tritoniacea
- Family: Tritoniidae
- Genus: Tritoniella
- Species: T. gnathodentata

Binomial name
- Tritoniella gnathodentata Schächinger, Schrödl, Wilson & Moles, 2022

Species of sea slug

Tritoniella gnathodentata is a species of the nudibranch genus Tritoniella.

== Distribution ==
It is found in the waters off of South Georgia and Shag Rocks in the northern parts of the Scotia Arc at depths between 119 m (400 ft) and 751 m (2,500 ft).

== Ecology ==
Its diet consists of the gorgonian soft coral belonging to the family Primnoidae.

== Etymology ==
The species name stems from the diagnostic character of dentition on the masticatory border of the jaws.
