= Batyl alcohol =

- S-enantiomer

Names
- IUPAC name 3-octadecoxypropane-1,2-diol
- Other names batylic alcohol, batilol, 1-O-octadecylglycerol, stearyl monoglyceride

Identifiers
CAS Number	544-62-7 racemic; 6129-13-1 S-enantiomer
3D model (JSmol)	Interactive image
Beilstein Reference	1725677
ChEBI	CHEBI:34117
ChEMBL	ChEMBL1482516
ChemSpider	3553
ECHA InfoCard	100.008.068
EC Number	208-874-7
KEGG	C13858
PubChem CID	3681
UNII	39YR661C4U
CompTox Dashboard (EPA)	DTXSID0047799
- InChI: InChI=1S/C21H44O3/c1-2-3-4-5-6-7-8-9-10-11-12-13-14-15-16-17-18-24-20-21(23)19-22/h21-23H,2-20H2,1H3 Key: OGBUMNBNEWYMNJ-UHFFFAOYSA-N
- SMILES: CCCCCCCCCCCCCCCCCCOCC(CO)O

Properties
Chemical formula	C_{21}H_{44}O_{3}
Molar mass	344.580 g·mol^{−1}
Appearance	colorless solid
Melting point	70.5 °C (158.9 °F; 343.6 K)
Boiling point	215–220 °C (419–428 °F; 488–493 K) 2 mmHg
- Except where otherwise noted, data are given for materials in their standard state (at 25 °C [77 °F], 100 kPa). Infobox references

Batyl alcohol is an organic compound with the formula HOCH_{2}CH(OH)CH_{2}OC_{18}H_{37}. It is a colorless solid. Batyl alcohol is a monoether formed by condensation of stearyl alcohol with one of the two primary alcohol sites of glycerol. Together with S-selachyl alcohol and S-chimyl alcohol, S-batyl alcohol is a component of some lipid membranes.

== Occurrence and metabolism ==
It is found in the liver of the shark Centrophorus squamosus. The name batyl is derived from a classification of rays, order Batoidea. Like other glyceryl ethers, those derived from batyl alcohol are not saponifiable.

Batyl alcohol and related glycyl ethers are susceptible to oxidation catalyzed by glyceryl-ether monooxygenases. The net oxidation gives glycerol and the carboxylic acid:

HOCH_{2}CH(OH)CH_{2}OC_{18}H_{37} + 1.5 O_{2} → HOCH_{2}CH(OH)CH_{2}OH + HO_{2}CHC_{17}H_{35} + H_{2}O

Batyl alcohol and related glycyl ethers are also susceptible to dehydrogenation catalyzed unsaturases to give the vinyl ethers called plasmalogens:

HOCH_{2}CH(OH)CH_{2}OC_{18}H_{37} + [O] → HOCH_{2}CH(OH)CH_{2}OCH=CHC_{16}H_{35} + H_{2}O
