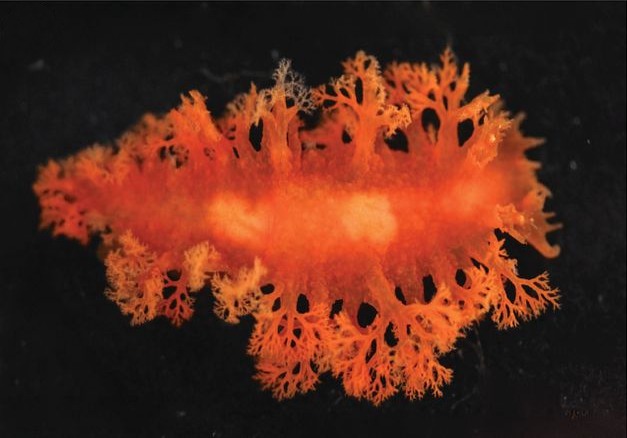
- Dorsal view of Tritoniopsis frydis

Scientific classification
- Kingdom: Animalia
- Phylum: Mollusca
- Class: Gastropoda
- Order: Nudibranchia
- Suborder: Tritoniacea
- Family: Tritoniidae
- Genus: Tritoniopsis
- Species: T. frydis

Binomial name
- Tritoniopsis frydis Er. Marcus & Ev. Marcus, 1970

= Tritoniopsis frydis =

Species of gastropod

Tritoniopsis frydis is a species of dendronotid nudibranch, a marine gastropod mollusc in the family Tritoniidae.

== Description ==
The maximum recorded body length is 20 mm.

== Habitat ==
Minimum recorded depth is 2 m. Maximum recorded depth is 3 m.
