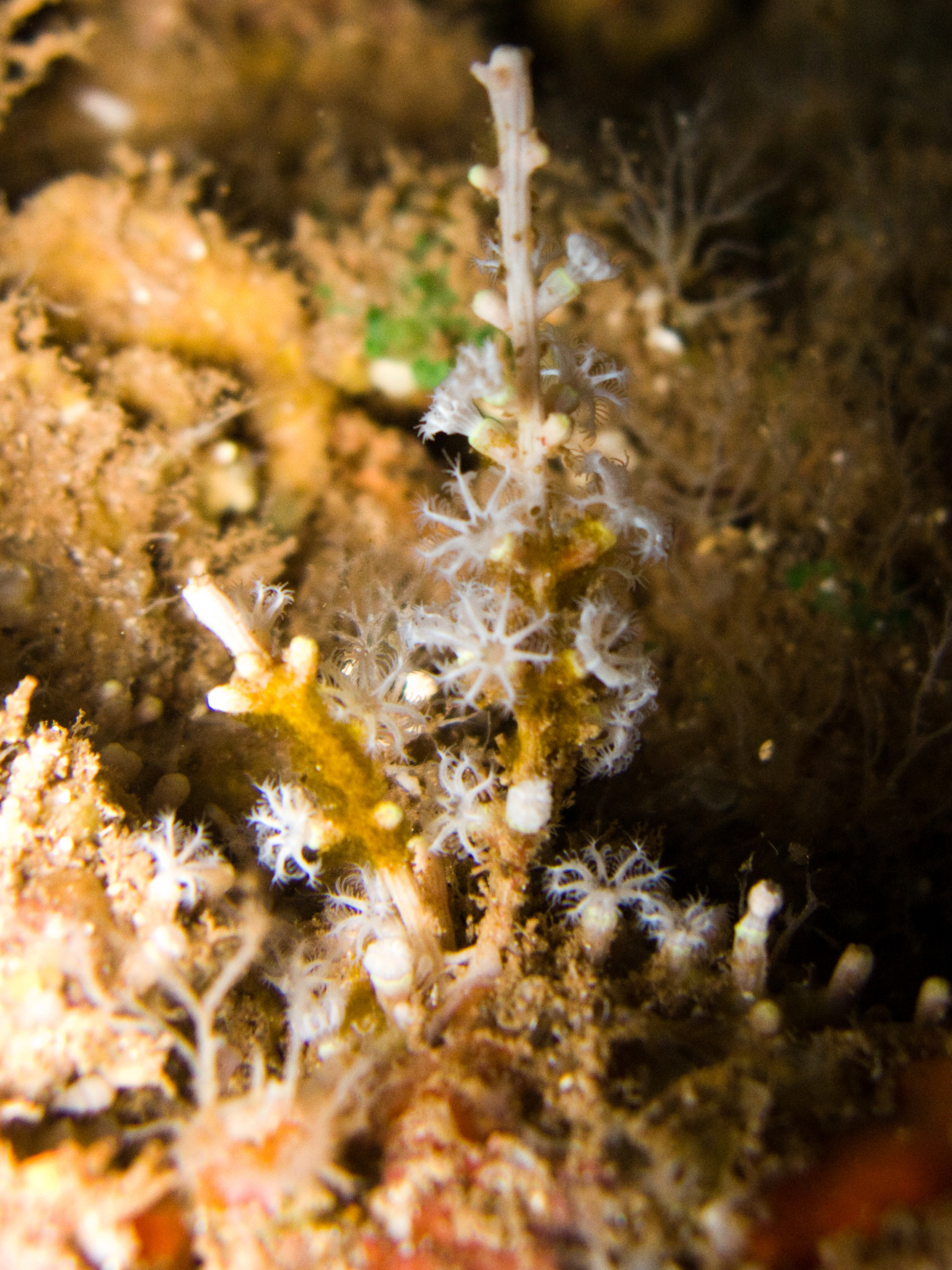
- Carijoa riisei

Scientific classification
- Kingdom: Animalia
- Phylum: Cnidaria
- Subphylum: Anthozoa
- Class: Octocorallia
- Order: Malacalcyonacea
- Family: Clavulariidae
- Genus: Carijoa; Mueller, 1867

Species
- See text

= Carijoa =

Genus of corals

Carijoa is a genus of soft corals in the family Clavulariidae.

== Species ==
The World Register of Marine Species includes the following species in the genus:

- Carijoa operculata (Bayer, 1961)
- Carijoa riisei (Duchassaing & Michelotti, 1860)
