= Enol ether =

Class of chemical compounds

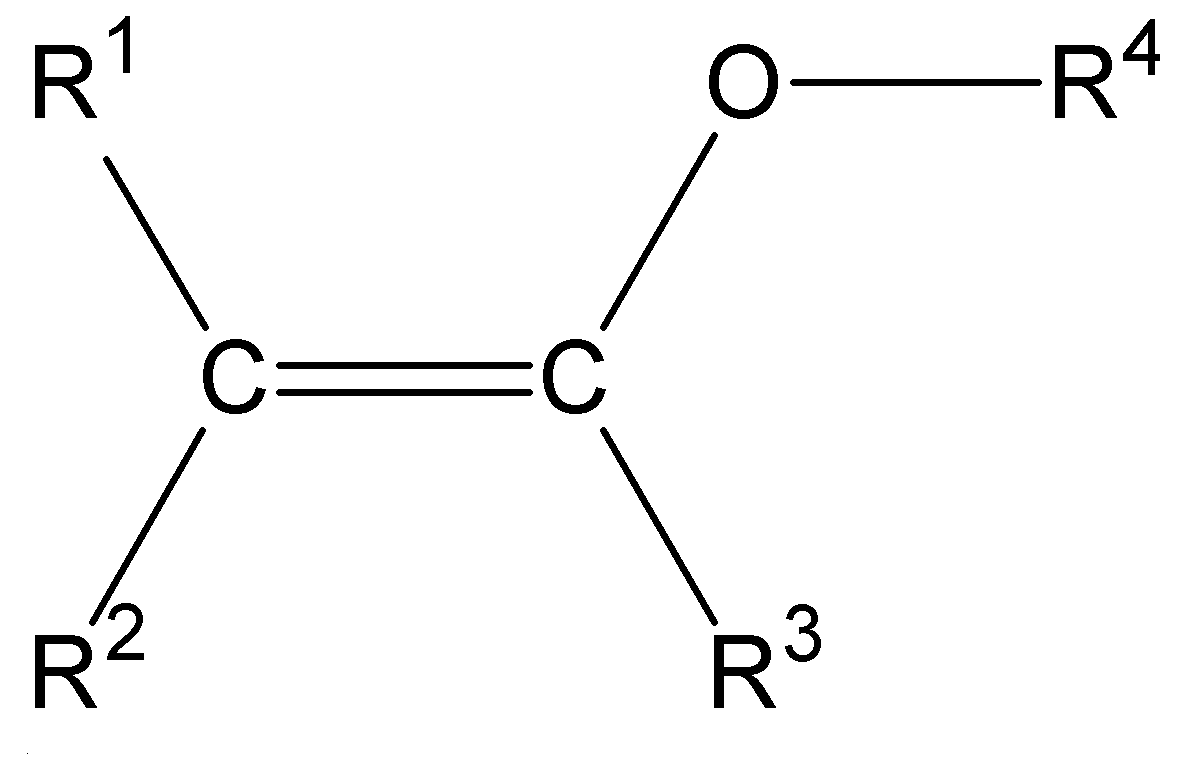
The structure of a typical enol ether group

Enamines are chemically related to enol ethers.

In organic chemistry an enol ether is an alkene with an alkoxy substituent. The general structure is R_{2}C=CR-OR where R = H, alkyl or aryl. A common subfamily of enol ethers are vinyl ethers, with the formula ROCH=CH_{2}. Important enol ethers include the reagent 3,4-dihydropyran and the monomers methyl vinyl ether and ethyl vinyl ether.

== Reactions and uses ==
Akin to enamines, enol ethers are electron-rich alkenes by virtue of the electron-donation from the heteroatom via pi-bonding. Enol ethers have oxonium ion character. By virtue of their bonding characteristics, enol ethers display distinctive reactivity. In comparison with simple alkenes, enol ethers exhibit enhanced susceptibility to attack by electrophiles such as Bronsted acids. Similarly, they undergo inverse demand Diels-Alder reactions.

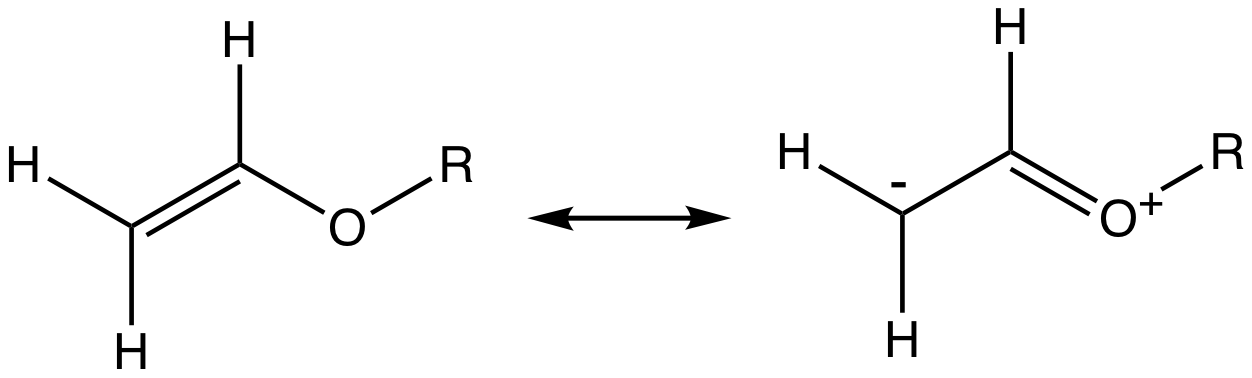

The reactivity of enol ethers is highly dependent on the presence of substituents alpha to oxygen. The vinyl ethers are susceptible to polymerization to give polyvinyl ethers. They also react readily with thiols in the thiol-ene reaction to form thioethers. This makes enol ether-functionalized monomers ideal for polymerization with thiol-based monomers to form thiol-ene networks.

Enol ethers bearing α substituents do not polymerize readily. They are mainly of academic interest, e.g. as intermediates in the synthesis of more complex molecules.

The acid-catalyzed addition of hydrogen peroxide to vinyl ethers gives the hydroperoxide:

C_{2}H_{5}OCH=CH_{2} + H_{2}O_{2} → C_{2}H_{5}OCH(OOH)CH_{3}

Nazi Germany used vinyl ether mixtures as rocket propellants during WWII, because their hypergolic combustion with a mixture of nitric and sulfuric acids is relatively insensitive to temperature.

Ethyl vinyl ether is a potent anesthetic.

Some vinyl ethers find some use as inhalation anesthetics.

== Preparation ==
Vinyl ethers can be prepared from alcohols by iridium-catalyzed transesterification of vinyl esters, especially the widely available vinyl acetate:

ROH + CH_{2}=CHOAc → ROCH=CH_{2} + HOAc

Vinyl ethers can be prepared by reaction of acetylene and alcohols in presence of a base.

Although enol ethers can be considered the ether of the corresponding enolates, they are not prepared by alkylation of enolates. Some enol ethers are prepared from saturated ethers by elimination reactions.

Alternatively, Wittig reagents react with esters to give enol ethers.

== Occurrence in nature ==
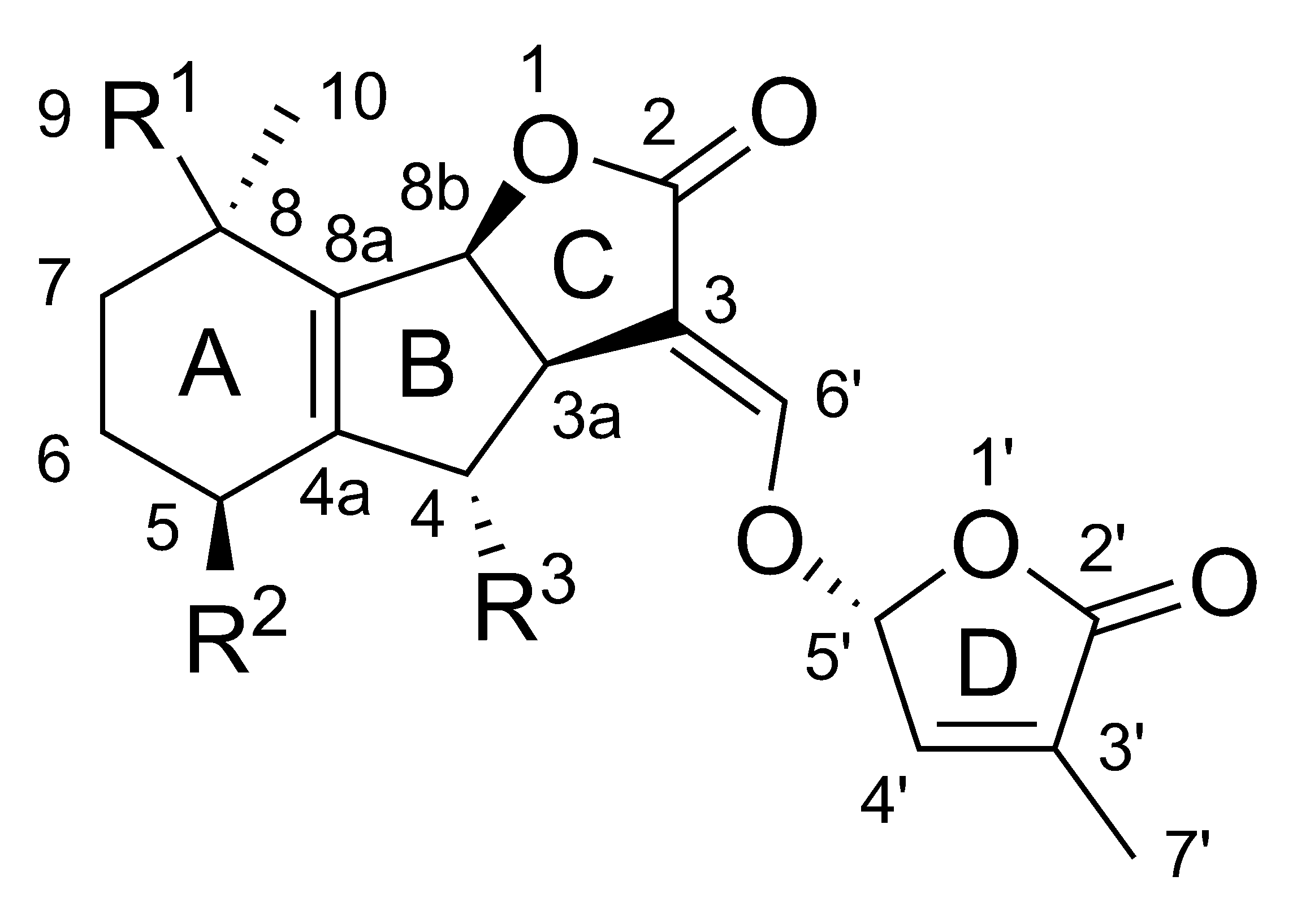
General structure of strigolactones, a family of plant hormones.

A prominent enol ether is phosphoenol pyruvate.

The enzyme chorismate mutase catalyzes the Claisen rearrangement of the enol ether called chorismate to prephenate, an intermediate in the biosynthesis of phenylalanine and tyrosine.

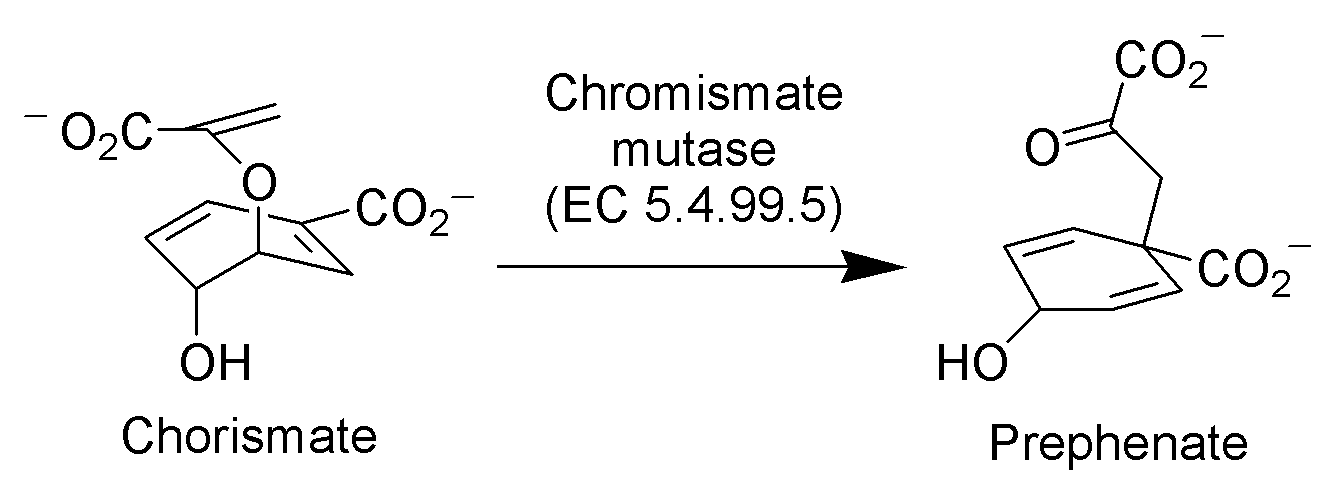
Chorismate mutase catalyzes a Claisen rearrangement

Batyl alcohol and related glycyl ethers are susceptible to dehydrogenation catalyzed unsaturases to give the vinyl ethers called plasmalogens:

HOCH_{2}CH(OH)CH_{2}OC_{18}H_{37} + [O] → HOCH_{2}CH(OH)CH_{2}OCH=CHC_{16}H_{35} + H_{2}O

== See also ==
- Silyl enol ether
