= Polyvinyl ether =

Polyvinylmethylether.

Polyvinyl ethers are a class of organic polymers derived from vinyl ethers. Common monomers include methyl vinyl ether and ethyl vinyl ether, the polymer having the formula [CH_{2}CH(OR)]_{n} (R = methyl, ethyl). Commercial interest has also focused on polymers derived from ethyl, isobutyl, octadecyl substituents in place of methyl. Like other vinyl polymers, the polymers exhibit tacticity. Polymerization is typically initiated with Lewis acids such as boron trifluoride.
