= Isotealia =

Scientific classification
- Domain: Eukaryota
- Kingdom: Animalia
- Phylum: Cnidaria
- Subphylum: Anthozoa
- Class: Hexacorallia
- Order: Actiniaria
- Family: Actiniidae
- Genus: Isotealia; Carlgren, 1899

Genus of sea anemones

Isotealia is a genus of sea anemones in the family Actiniidae.

== Species ==
The World Register of Marine Species includes the following species in the genus:-

- Isotealia antarctica Carlgren, 1899
- Isotealia dubia (Wassilieff, 1908)
