= Tritoniopsis brucei =

Scientific classification
- Kingdom: Animalia
- Phylum: Mollusca
- Class: Gastropoda
- Order: Nudibranchia
- Suborder: Tritoniacea
- Family: Tritoniidae
- Genus: Tritoniopsis
- Species: T. brucei

Binomial name
- Tritoniopsis brucei Eliot, 1905

Species of gastropod

Tritoniopsis brucei is a species of dendronotid nudibranch. It is a marine gastropod mollusc in the family Tritoniidae.

== Distribution ==
This species was described from Gough Island, Falklands.
