= Cetyl alcohol =

- Skeletal formula

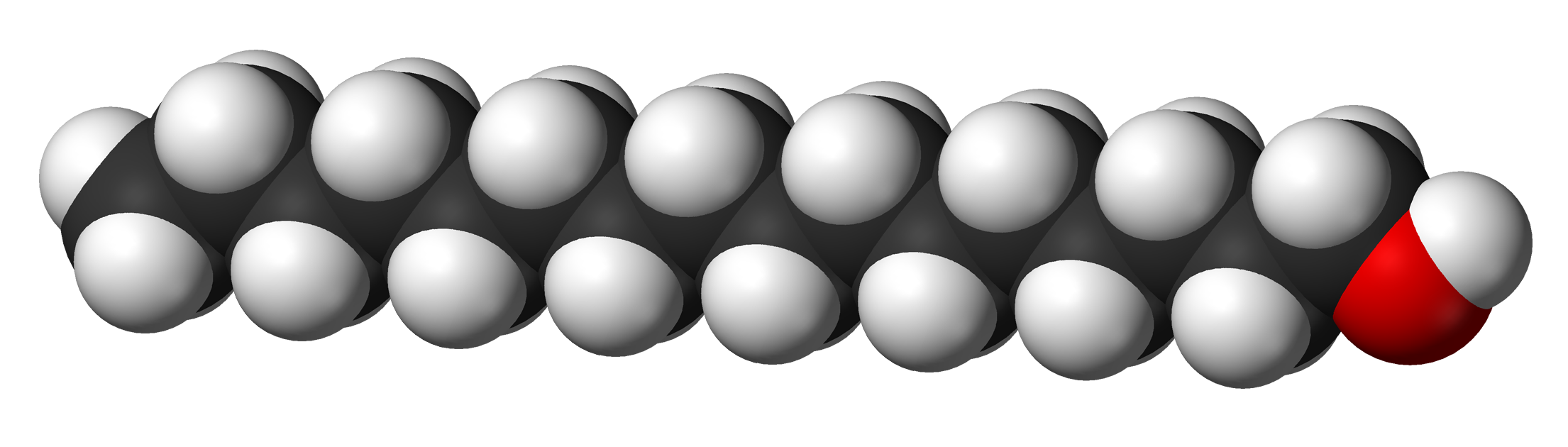
- Space-filling model

Names
- Preferred IUPAC name Hexadecan-1-ol
- Other names Cetanol, Cetyl alcohol, Ethal, Ethol, Hexadecanol, Hexadecyl alcohol, Palmityl alcohol

Identifiers
CAS Number	36653-82-4
3D model (JSmol)	Interactive image
ChEBI	CHEBI:16125
ChEMBL	ChEMBL706
ChemSpider	2581
ECHA InfoCard	100.048.301
EC Number	253-149-0
KEGG	D00099
PubChem CID	2682
UNII	936JST6JCN
CompTox Dashboard (EPA)	DTXSID4027991
- InChI: InChI=1S/C16H34O/c1-2-3-4-5-6-7-8-9-10-11-12-13-14-15-16-17/h17H,2-16H2,1H3 Key: BXWNKGSJHAJOGX-UHFFFAOYSA-N; InChI=1/C16H34O/c1-2-3-4-5-6-7-8-9-10-11-12-13-14-15-16-17/h17H,2-16H2,1H3 Key: BXWNKGSJHAJOGX-UHFFFAOYAS
- SMILES: OCCCCCCCCCCCCCCCC

Properties
Chemical formula	C_{16}H_{34}O
Molar mass	242.447 g·mol^{−1}
Appearance	White crystals or flakes
Odor	Very faint, waxy
Density	0.811 g/cm^{3}
Melting point	49.3 °C (120.7 °F; 322.4 K)
Boiling point	344 °C (651 °F; 617 K)
Solubility in water	Insoluble
Solubility	Very soluble in ether, benzene, and chloroform. Soluble in acetone. Slightly soluble in alcohol.
log P	7.25
Acidity (pK_{a})	16.20
Magnetic susceptibility (χ)	−183.5·10^{−6} cm^{3}/mol
Refractive index (n_{D})	1.4283 (79 °C)
Viscosity	53 cP (75 °C)

Hazards
- GHS labelling
Pictograms	(GHS07: Exclamation mark)
Signal word	Warning
Hazard statements	H319
Precautionary statements	P264+P265, P280, P305+P351+P338, P337+P317
NFPA 704 (fire diamond)	1 1 0
Flash point	185 °C (365 °F; 458 K)
- Lethal dose or concentration (LD, LC)
LD_{50} (median dose)	5000 mg/kg (rat, oral)
- Except where otherwise noted, data are given for materials in their standard state (at 25 °C [77 °F], 100 kPa). verify (what is ?) Infobox references

Cetyl alcohol /ˈsiːtəl/, also known as hexadecan-1-ol and palmityl alcohol, is a C-16 fatty alcohol with the formula C_{16}H_{34}O or CH_{3}(CH_{2})_{15}OH. At room temperature, cetyl alcohol takes the form of a waxy white solid or flakes. The name cetyl refers to whales (cetacea, from Latin: cetus, lit. 'whale', from Ancient Greek: κῆτος, romanized: kētos, lit. 'huge fish'), specifically sperm whales, from which it was first isolated.

== Preparation ==
Cetyl alcohol was discovered in 1817 by the French chemist Michel Chevreul when he heated spermaceti, a waxy substance obtained from sperm oil, with caustic potash (potassium hydroxide). Flakes of cetyl alcohol were left behind on cooling. Modern production is based around the chemical reduction of ethyl palmitate.

== Occurrence and uses ==
The ether chimyl alcohol, derived from cetyl alcohol and glycerol, is a component of some lipid membranes.

Cetyl alcohol is used in the cosmetic industry as an opacifier in shampoos, or as an emollient, emulsifier or thickening agent in the manufacture of skin creams and lotions. It is also employed as a lubricant for nuts and bolts, and is the active ingredient in some "liquid pool covers" (forming a non-volatile surface layer to reduce water evaporation, related latent vaporization heat loss, and thus to retain heat in the pool). Moreover, it can also be used as a non-ionic co-surfactant in emulsion applications.

== Side effects ==
People who have eczema can be sensitive to cetyl alcohol, though this may be due to impurities rather than cetyl alcohol itself. However, cetyl alcohol is sometimes included in medications used for the treatment of eczema.

== Related compounds ==
- Palmitate
- Palmitic acid
