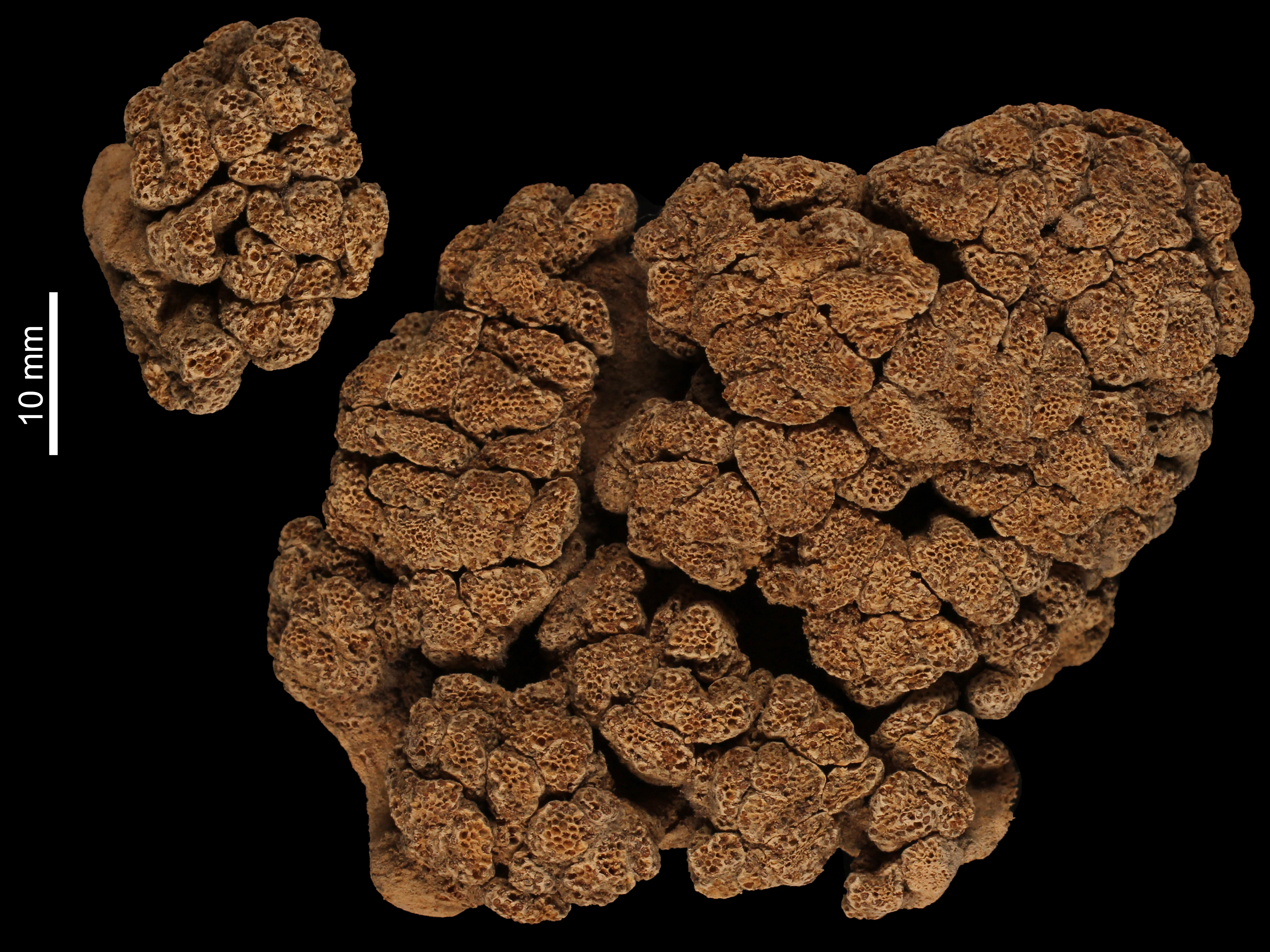

Scientific classification
- Kingdom: Animalia
- Phylum: Cnidaria
- Subphylum: Anthozoa
- Class: Octocorallia
- Order: Malacalcyonacea
- Family: Cladiellidae
- Genus: Cladiella
- Species: C. variabilis

Binomial name
- Cladiella variabilis (Tixier-Durivault, 1944)

Synonyms
- Lobularia variabilis Tixier-Durivault, 1944

= Cladiella variabilis =

Species of coral

Cladiella variabilis is a species of coral. It has been recorded in the Gulf of Suez.
