= Cryptophyton =

Scientific classification
- Domain: Eukaryota
- Kingdom: Animalia
- Phylum: Cnidaria
- Class: Octocorallia
- Order: Alcyonacea
- Family: Clavulariidae
- Genus: Cryptophyton; Williams, 2000

Genus of corals

Cryptophyton is a genus of corals belonging to the family Clavulariidae.

The species of this genus are found in Northern America.

Species:

- Cryptophyton goddardi Williams, 2000
- Cryptophyton jedsmithi Williams, 2013
