= Tritoniella gnocchi =

Scientific classification
- Kingdom: Animalia
- Phylum: Mollusca
- Class: Gastropoda
- Order: Nudibranchia
- Suborder: Tritoniacea
- Family: Tritoniidae
- Genus: Tritoniella
- Species: T. gnocchi

Binomial name
- Tritoniella gnocchi Schächinger, Schrödl, Wilson & Moles, 2022

Species of sea slug

Tritoniella gnocchi is a species of the nudibranch genus Tritoniella.

== Distribution ==
It is a singleton species that was found at Burdwood Bank East south of the Falkland Islands at a depth of approximately 565 m (1,900 ft). It is the only Tritoniella species that was found north of the Polar front outside of the Southern Ocean.

== Ecology ==
Its diet consists of the gorgonian soft coral belonging to the family Primnoidae.

== Etymology ==
The species name was dedicated to the Italian dumpling gnocchi due to the similarity to its external body form.
