= Methyl vinyl ether =

Names
- Preferred IUPAC name Methoxyethene
- Other names Ethenyl methyl ether Vinyl methyl ether

Identifiers
| CAS Number | 107-25-5 |
| 3D model (JSmol) | Interactive image; Interactive image |
| ChemSpider | 7573 |
| ECHA InfoCard | 100.003.161 |
| EC Number | 203-475-4 |
| PubChem CID | 7861 |
| UNII | G2OHX46576 |
| UN number | 1087 |
| CompTox Dashboard (EPA) | DTXSID4026761 |
- InChI: InChI=1S/C3H6O/c1-3-4-2/h3H,1H2,2H3 Key: XJRBAMWJDBPFIM-UHFFFAOYSA-N
- SMILES: O(C=C)C; COC=C

Properties
| Chemical formula | C_{3}H_{6}O |
| Molar mass | 58.080 g·mol^{−1} |
| Density | 0.77 g/cm^{−3} |
| Melting point | −122 °C (−188 °F; 151 K) |
| Boiling point | 6 °C (43 °F; 279 K) |
| Vapor pressure | 157 kPa (20 °C) |

Hazards
- GHS labelling
| Pictograms | (GHS02: Flammable) |
| Signal word | Danger |
| Hazard statements | H220 |
| Precautionary statements | P210, P377, P381, P403 |
| NFPA 704 (fire diamond) | 2 4 2 W |
| Flash point | −60 °C (−76 °F; 213 K) |
- Except where otherwise noted, data are given for materials in their standard state (at 25 °C [77 °F], 100 kPa). verify (what is ?) Infobox references

Methyl vinyl ether is an organic compound with the chemical formula CH_{3}OCH=CH_{2}. A colorless gas, it is the simplest enol ether. It is used as a synthetic building block, as is the related compound ethyl vinyl ether (a liquid at room temperature).

== Preparation ==
Methyl vinyl ether can be made by reaction of acetylene and methanol in presence of a base.

== Reactions ==
The alkene portion of the molecule is reactive in many ways. It is prone to polymerization, leading to formation of polyvinyl ethers. Polymerization is typically initiated with Lewis acids such as boron trifluoride. This mode of reactivity is analogous to the way vinyl acetate and vinyl chloride can be polymerized to form polyvinyl acetate and polyvinyl chloride, respectively.

Methyl vinyl ether also participates in [4+2] cycloaddition reactions. Its reaction with acrolein is the first step in the commercial synthesis of glutaraldehyde.

The alkene can be deprotonated at the vinyl carbon adjacent to the oxygen. In particular, this approach allows the synthesis of a variety of acyl derivatives of silicon, germanium, and tin that cannot be made easily by other routes.

== Toxicity ==
The toxicity of vinyl ethers has been heavily investigated because divinyl ether has been used as an anesthetic. The acute LD_{50} for methyl vinyl ether is greater than 4 g/kg (rats, oral).
