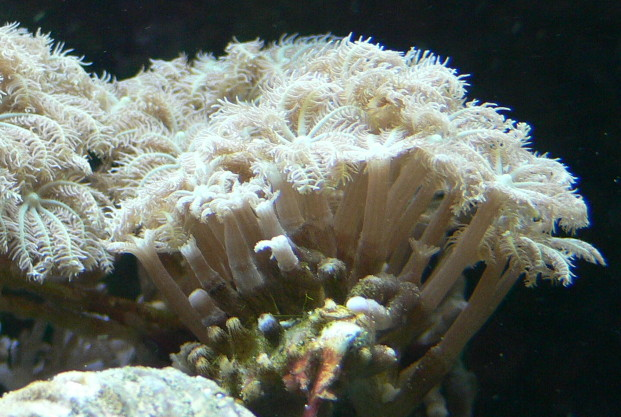

Scientific classification
- Domain: Eukaryota
- Kingdom: Animalia
- Phylum: Cnidaria
- Class: Octocorallia
- Order: Alcyonacea
- Family: Clavulariidae
- Genus: Clavularia; Blainville, 1830

Synonyms
- Rhizoxenia Ehrenberg, 1834

= Clavularia =

Genus of corals

Clavularia is a genus of corals in the family Clavulariidae. They are often referred by the common names star polyps or clove polyps.

== Species ==
There are 69 accepted species in this genus:

- Clavularia alba (Grieg, 1888)
- Clavularia arctica (Sars, 1860)
- Clavularia armata Thomson, 1927
- Clavularia australiensis Hickson, 1894
- Clavularia bathybius (Saville Kent, 1870)
- Clavularia borealis Koren & Danielsen, 1883
- Clavularia capensis (Studer, 1879)
- Clavularia carpediem Weinberg, 1986
- Clavularia charoti (Tixier-Durivault & d'Hondt, 1974)
- Clavularia concreta Studer, 1901
- Clavularia crassa (Milne Edwards, 1848)
- Clavularia crosslandi Thomson & Henderson, 1906
- Clavularia cylindrica Wright & Studer, 1889
- Clavularia delicatula Thomson & Dean, 1931
- Clavularia densum (Tixier-Durivault & d'Hondt, 1974)
- Clavularia desjardiniana (Templeton, 1835)
- Clavularia diademata Broch, 1939
- Clavularia dispersa Kükenthal, 1906
- Clavularia durum Hickson, 1930
- Clavularia eburnea Kükenthal, 1906
- Clavularia elongata Wright & Studer, 1889
- Clavularia expansa Thomson & Dean, 1931
- Clavularia filiformis (Sars, 1856)
- Clavularia filippi (Kölliker, 1864)
- Clavularia flava May, 1899
- Clavularia frankliniana Roule, 1902
- Clavularia frigida Danielssen, 1887
- Clavularia garcia Hickson, 1894
- Clavularia grandiflora (Nutting, 1908)
- Clavularia griegii Madsen, 1944
- Clavularia inflata Schenk, 1896
- Clavularia koellikeri (Dean, 1927)
- Clavularia laxa Tixier-Durivault, 1966
- Clavularia levidensis Madsen, 1944
- Clavularia longissima May, 1898
- Clavularia magelhaenica Studer, 1878
- Clavularia margaritaceum (Grieg, 1888)
- Clavularia margaritferae Thomson & Henderson, 1905
- Clavularia marioni (Von Koch, 1891)
- Clavularia mikado Utinomi, 1955
- Clavularia modesta (Verrill, 1874)
- Clavularia mollis Thomson & Henderson, 1906
- Clavularia morbesbii Hickson, 1915
- Clavularia multispiculosa Utinomi, 1955
- Clavularia notanda Tixier-Durivault, 1964
- Clavularia novaezealandiae Brewin, 1945
- Clavularia ornata Thomson & Dean, 1931
- Clavularia pacifica Kükenthal, 1913
- Clavularia papaya Kükenthal, 1913
- Clavularia parva Tixier-Durivault, 1964
- Clavularia parvula Thomson & Henderson, 1906
- Clavularia peterseni Kükenthal, 1906
- Clavularia pregnans Thomson & Henderson, 1906
- Clavularia primula (Dana, 1846)
- Clavularia pulchra Thomson & Henderson, 1906
- Clavularia purpurascens (Dana, 1846)
- Clavularia racemosa Utinomi, 1950
- Clavularia ramosa Hickson, 1894
- Clavularia repens Thomson & Henderson, 1906
- Clavularia reptans Hickson, 1894
- Clavularia rigida Broch, 1935
- Clavularia spongicola Utinomi, 1955
- Clavularia stormi Koren & Danielsen, 1883
- Clavularia strumosa (Dana, 1846)
- Clavularia tenuis Tixier-Durivault & d´Hondt, 1974
- Clavularia thalassanthos (Lesson, 1830)
- Clavularia thompsoni Benham, 1928
- Clavularia venustella Madsen, 1944
- Clavularia viridis (Quoy & Gaimard, 1833)
- Clavularia zanzibarensis Thomson & Henderson, 1906
