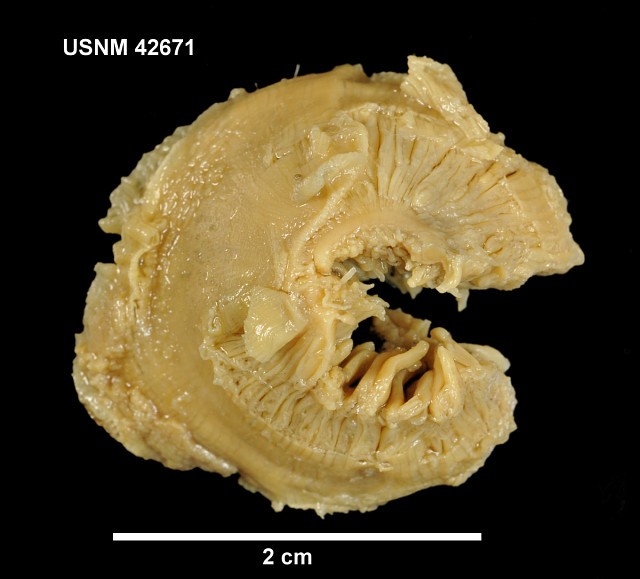
- cross section of a preserved specimen

Scientific classification
- Kingdom: Animalia
- Phylum: Cnidaria
- Subphylum: Anthozoa
- Class: Hexacorallia
- Order: Actiniaria
- Family: Actiniidae
- Genus: Isotealia
- Species: I. antarctica

Binomial name
- Isotealia antarctica Carlgren, 1899

= Isotealia antarctica =

Species of sea anemone

Isotealia antarctica, the salmon anemone, is a species of sea anemone in the family Actiniidae. It is found in the southern Atlantic and Pacific Oceans and the waters around Antarctica. It is a filter feeder and opportunistic predator.

== Description ==
This is a robust sea anemone with a disc diameter of 10 to 12 cm (4 to 5 in). The pedal disc is well-developed and the column is short and smooth, divided into a scapus and a scapulus region. The sphincter muscle is strong and there are two siphonoglyphs. The tentacles are short and arranged in multiples of six, the outer ones being shorter than the inner. The colour is variable.

== Distribution and habitat ==
Isotealia antarctica occurs in the southwestern Atlantic Ocean, the southeastern Pacific Ocean and the waters around Antarctica. This sea anemone usually lives on rocky substrates and its depth range is from 25 to 420 m (82 to 1,378 ft).

== Ecology ==
In the waters around Antarctica, Isotealia antarctica is the principal predator of the sea urchin Sterechinus neumayeri. This sea urchin habitually has fragments of red algae adhering to its spines, and often conceals itself among rooted or floating fronds of the red seaweed Phyllophora antarctica. If the sea urchin comes into contact with the tentacles of the sea anemone, it may be unable to tear itself free, however, if it is swathed in seaweed fragments or concealed among the seaweed fronds, the sea anemone's tentacles may adhere to the algal material, enabling the sea urchin to make good its escape. In Patagonia, it has been found living on the shells of gastropod molluscs, and this may be an important settlement site for the sea anemone in areas where the seabed is covered with soft sediment. Living and dead shells of Adelomelon ancilla were favoured, with six individuals of I. antarctica sharing one living A. ancilla shell in one instance, and in some instances, I. antarctica sharing a shell with another species of sea anemone, Antholoba achates.

Isotealia antarctica is the most important predator of the common Antarctic nudibranch, Tritoniella belli. However, 70% of captured individuals manage to escape from the tentacles, or are regurgitated from the gastrovascular cavity of the sea anemone.
