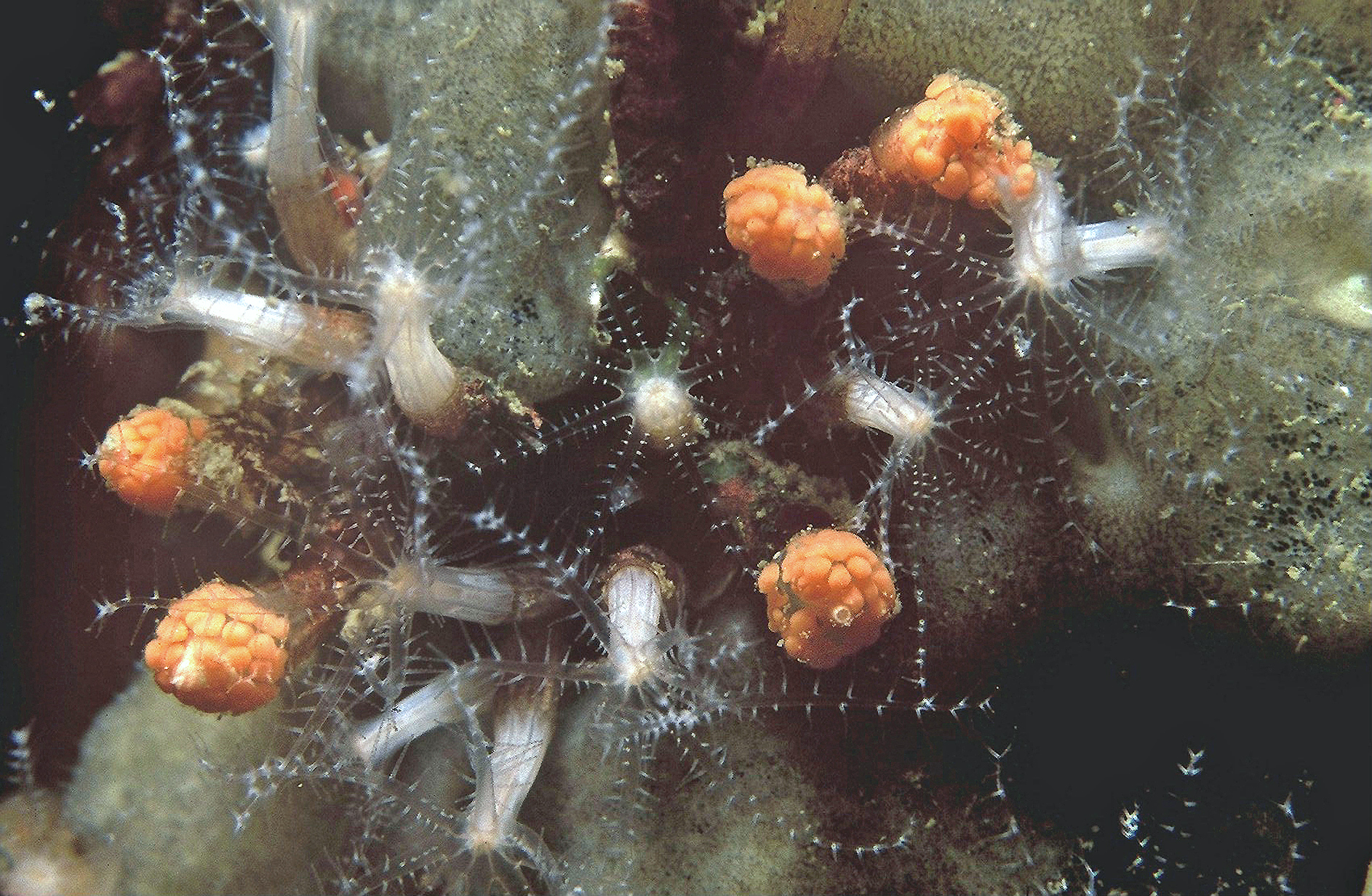
- C. crassa with egg clusters

Conservation status
- Least Concern (IUCN 3.1)

Scientific classification
- Kingdom: Animalia
- Phylum: Cnidaria
- Subphylum: Anthozoa
- Class: Octocorallia
- Order: Malacalcyonacea
- Family: Clavulariidae
- Genus: Clavularia
- Species: C. crassa

Binomial name
- Clavularia crassa (Milne Edwards, 1848)

Synonyms
- Clavularia inordinata Tixier-Durivault & Lafargue, 1968; Clavularia ochracea Von Koch, 1878; Clavularia petricola Kowalevsky & Marion, 1882; Clavularia steveninoae d'Hondt & Tixier-Durivault, 1975

= Clavularia crassa =

Species of coral

Clavularia crassa is a species of colonial soft coral in the family Clavulariidae. It is found in the eastern Atlantic Ocean and the Mediterranean Sea. It was first described in 1848 by the French zoologist Henri Milne-Edwards from a specimen collected off the coast of Algeria.

== Description ==
Clavularia crassa forms small colonies of up to about fifty individual polyps growing from a stolon. This grows along the surface of the substrate and it, and the bases of the polyps, are orangish-brown. Each polyp is up to 10 mm (0.4 in) long and 2 mm (0.1 in) wide. The column is slender and creamy-white and the eight long, feathery tentacles are either transparent white, or colourless flecked with white. The oral surface is stiffened by calcareous sclerites.

Other soft corals with which this species might be confused include Cornularia cornucopiae and Sarcodictyon catenatum. C. cornucopiae has shorter polyps and narrower stolons, and its tissues does not contain sclerites. S. catenatum has much smaller polyps and its thick stolon is brick red and clearly visible.

== Distribution ==
Clavularia crassa is found in the Mediterranean Sea and the proximate areas of the eastern Atlantic Ocean, the coasts of Portugal and Algeria. It occurs in positions with moderate to high movement of water and its depth range is from about 1 to 33 metres (3 to 100 ft).

== Biology ==
The polyps of Clavularia crassa are able to partially retract. When extended they feed on zooplankton which are filtered from the water by the tentacles. This octocoral is often to be found growing on the rhizomes of the seagrass known as Neptune grass (Posidonia oceanica), as well as on algae and sponges. From late June onwards, eggs are extruded through the mouths of the polyps and remain stuck together in small orange clusters. They are brooded on the outer surface of the polyps.
