= Ethyl vinyl ether =

Names
- Preferred IUPAC name Ethoxyethene
- Other names Ethoxyethylene, Vinamar

Identifiers
CAS Number	109-92-2
3D model (JSmol)	Interactive image
ChEMBL	ChEMBL116745
ChemSpider	7732
ECHA InfoCard	100.003.382
EC Number	203-718-4
PubChem CID	8023
RTECS number	KO0710000
UNII	6235C9592H
UN number	1302
CompTox Dashboard (EPA)	DTXSID3029609
- InChI: InChI=1S/C4H8O/c1-3-5-4-2/h3H,1,4H2,2H3 Key: FJKIXWOMBXYWOQ-UHFFFAOYSA-N
- SMILES: CCOC=C

Properties
Chemical formula	C_{4}H_{8}O
Molar mass	72.107 g·mol^{−1}
Appearance	colorless liquid
Density	0.7589 g/mL
Melting point	−116 °C (−177 °F; 157 K)
Boiling point	33 °C (91 °F; 306 K)
Solubility in water	8.3 g/L at 15°C

Hazards
- GHS labelling
Pictograms	(GHS02: Flammable) (GHS07: Exclamation mark)
Signal word	Warning
Hazard statements	H225, H319, H335, H412
Precautionary statements	P210, P233, P240, P241, P242, P243, P261, P264, P271, P273, P280, P303+P361+P353, P304+P340, P305+P351+P338, P312, P337+P313, P370+P378, P403+P233, P403+P235, P405, P501
Autoignition temperature	202 °C (396 °F; 475 K)
- Except where otherwise noted, data are given for materials in their standard state (at 25 °C [77 °F], 100 kPa). Infobox references

Ethyl vinyl ether is an organic compound with the chemical formula CH_{3}CH_{2}OCH=CH_{2}. It is the simplest enol ether that is liquid at room temperature. It is used as a synthetic building block and a monomer.

Use of ethyl vinyl ether in the synthesis of glutaraldehyde.

== Preparation and reactions ==
Ethyl vinyl ether is made by reaction of acetylene and ethanol in presence of a base.

The alkene portion of the molecule is reactive in many ways. It is prone to polymerization, leading to formation of polyvinyl ethers. Polymerization is typically initiated with Lewis acids such as boron trifluoride.

Ethyl vinyl ether participates in many reactions of interest to organic synthesis. With catalytic amounts of acids, ethyl vinyl ether adds to alcohols to give the mixed acetal:

EtOCH=CH_{2} + ROH → EtOCH(OR)CH_{3}

This alcohol protection reaction is akin to the behavior of dihydropyran.

Ethyl vinyl ether also participates in inverse demand [4+2] cycloaddition reactions.

Deprotonation with butyl lithium gives the acetyl anion equivalent:

EtOCH=CH_{2} + BuLi → EtOC(Li)=CH_{2} + BuH

== Toxicity ==
The toxicity of vinyl ethers has been heavily investigated because they have been used as inhalation anesthetics. The acute LD_{50} for the closely related methyl vinyl ether is greater than 4 g/kg (rats, oral).
