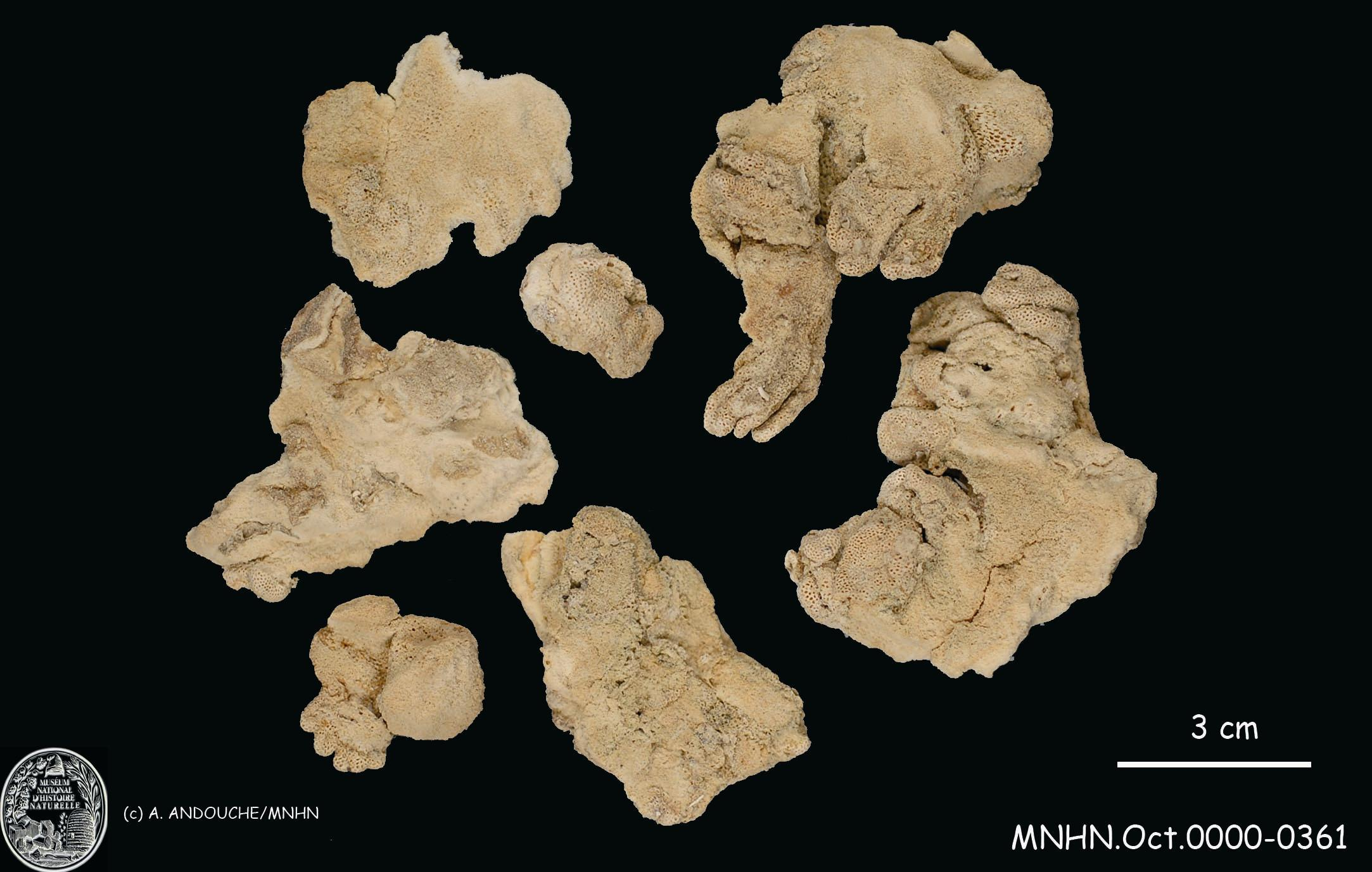

Scientific classification
- Kingdom: Animalia
- Phylum: Cnidaria
- Subphylum: Anthozoa
- Class: Octocorallia
- Order: Malacalcyonacea
- Family: Cladiellidae
- Genus: Cladiella
- Species: C. australis

Binomial name
- Cladiella australis (Macfadyen, 1936)

= Cladiella australis =

Species of coral

Cladiella australis is a species of soft coral in the family Cladiellidae. It is found in the western Indo-Pacific. It is commonly known as the finger blanching soft coral because with the polyps extended it appears brown but when poked with a finger, the polyps retract into the leathery base tissue and the coral appears white.

== Secondary metabolites ==
Five new diterpenes with tricyclic skeletons of cladiellin have been isolated from this soft coral.
