= Tritoniopsis cincta =

Scientific classification
- Kingdom: Animalia
- Phylum: Mollusca
- Class: Gastropoda
- Order: Nudibranchia
- Suborder: Tritoniacea
- Family: Tritoniidae
- Genus: Tritoniopsis
- Species: T. cincta

Binomial name
- Tritoniopsis cincta (Pruvot-Fol, 1937)

Synonyms
- Tritonia cincta Pruvot-Fol, 1937

Species of gastropod

Tritoniopsis cincta is a species of dendronotid nudibranch. It is a marine gastropod mollusc in the family Tritoniidae.

== Distribution ==
This species was described from Banyuls-sur-Mer, France in the Mediterranean Sea. It has been reported from the Spanish, French and Italian coasts. It has also been reported from the Bay of Biscay at Donostia on the Atlantic Coast of Spain.

== Description ==
Tritoniopsis cincta has a translucent white body with a yellow line at the mantle edge. The gills are tipped with red. The tips of the rhinophores and larger processes on the oral veil are opaque white.
