= Selachyl alcohol =

- S-selachylic alcohol

Names
- IUPAC name 3-[(Z)-octadec-9-enoxy]propane-1,2-diol
- Other names selachylic alcohol, glycerol 1-oleyl ether, oleyl glyceryl ether

Identifiers
CAS Number	racemic: 593-31-7; (S): 6898-45-9
3D model (JSmol)	Interactive image
Beilstein Reference	1912756
ChEBI	CHEBI:34116
ChemSpider	4445453
ECHA InfoCard	100.008.899
EC Number	209-787-7
KEGG	C13860
PubChem CID	racemic: 5282282; (S): 53242580
UNII	9734969CCZ
CompTox Dashboard (EPA)	DTXSID701021791
- InChI: InChI=1S/C21H42O3/c1-2-3-4-5-6-7-8-9-10-11-12-13-14-15-16-17-18-24-20-21(23)19-22/h9-10,21-23H,2-8,11-20H2,1H3/b10-9- Key: NRWMBHYHFFGEEC-KTKRTIGZSA-N
- SMILES: CCCCCCCC/C=C\CCCCCCCCOCC(CO)O

Properties
Chemical formula	C_{21}H_{42}O_{3}
Molar mass	342.564 g·mol^{−1}
Appearance	colorless oil
Melting point	5.5–7.5 °C (41.9–45.5 °F; 278.6–280.6 K)
Boiling point	145–146 °C (293–295 °F; 418–419 K) 0.5 mm
- Except where otherwise noted, data are given for materials in their standard state (at 25 °C [77 °F], 100 kPa). Infobox references

Selachyl alcohol is an organic compound with the formula HOCH_{2}CH(OH)CH_{2}OC_{18}H_{35}. It is a colorless oil. Selachyl alcohol is a monoether formed by condensation of oleyl alcohol with one of the two primary alcohol sites of glycerol. Together with S-batyl alcohol and S-chimyl alcohol, S-selachyl alcohol is a component of some lipid membranes. It is found in the liver of the shark Centrophorus squamosus. The name selachyl is derived from a classification of sharks, the neoselachii. Like other glyceryl ethers, those derived from selachyl alcohol are not saponifiable.
