= Chithramia =

Scientific classification
- Kingdom: Fungi
- Division: Ascomycota
- Class: incertae sedis
- Order: incertae sedis
- Family: incertae sedis
- Genus: Chithramia; Nag Raj, 1988

Species
- Chithramia elegantissima

Genus of fungi

Chithramia is a genus of fungi of unknown placement within Ascomycota. It contains one species, Chithramia elegantissima.
