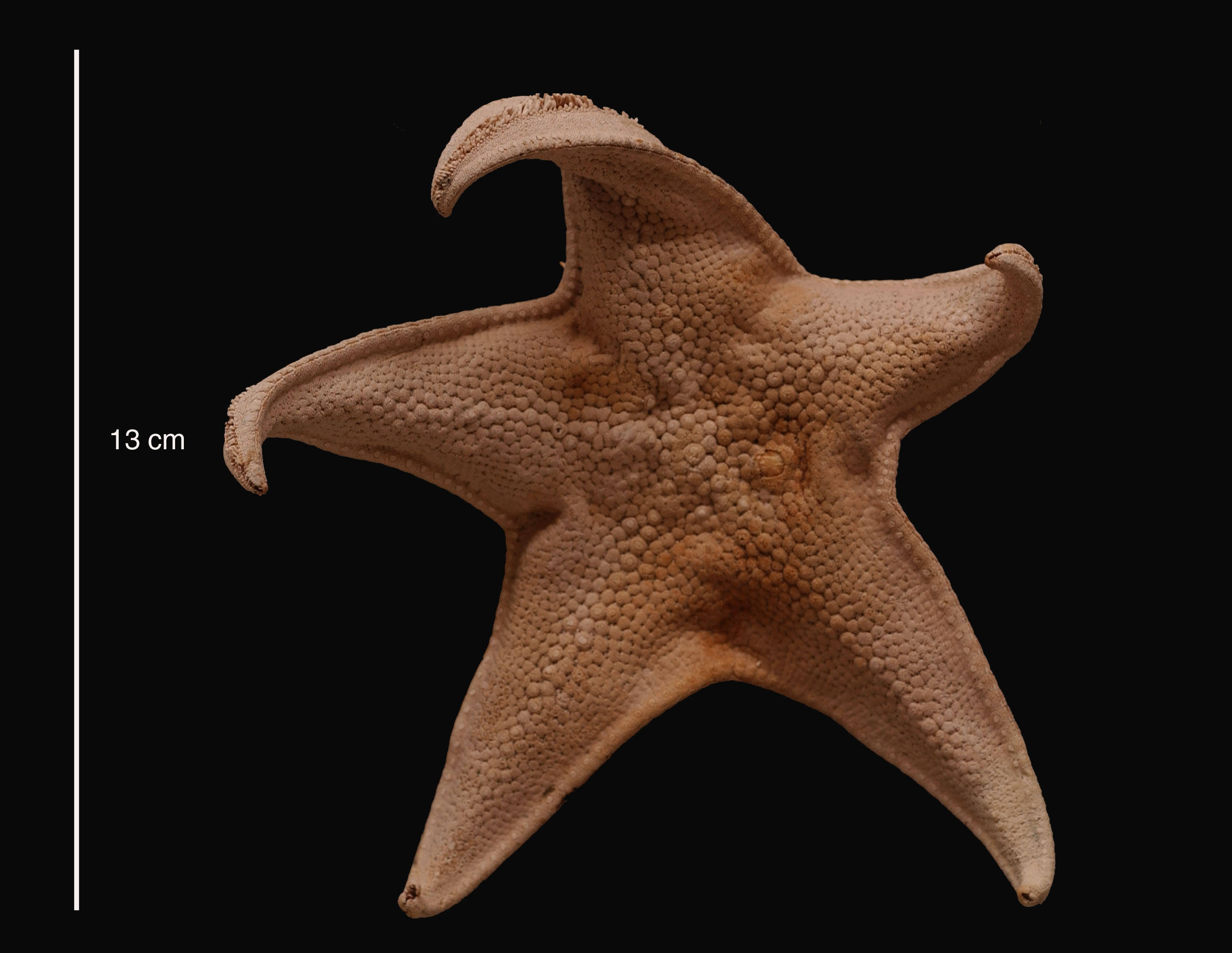

Scientific classification
- Kingdom: Animalia
- Phylum: Echinodermata
- Class: Asteroidea
- Order: Valvatida
- Family: Odontasteridae
- Genus: Acodontaster
- Species: A. conspicuus

Binomial name
- Acodontaster conspicuus (Koehler, 1920)

Synonyms
- Acodontaster abbreviatus Koehler, 1923; Acodontaster elongatus var. abbreviatus (Koehler, 1923); Acodontaster waitei (Koehler, 1920); Pseudontaster conspicuus Koehler, 1920

= Acodontaster conspicuus =

Species of starfish

Acodontaster conspicuus is a species of starfish in the family Odontasteridae. It is found in the Southern Ocean, in the waters off Antarctica and the island groups nearby.

== Description ==
Acodontaster conspicuus grows to about 30 cm (12 in) in diameter. It has 5 arms and the body has a cushion-like appearance, being thick except around the margins where there is a thin flat area. The upper surface has radially arranged granulations. The colour varies but is usually orange or brown.

== Distribution ==
Acodontaster conspicuus is found in the cold seas around Antarctica, including the Antarctic Peninsula and South Georgia, at depths down to 750 metres.

== Ecology ==
Acodontaster conspicuus feeds on sponges, including the fast-growing species Mycale acerata, which might dominate the Antarctic marine ecosystem if not kept under control. Acodontaster conspicuus is itself eaten by the proboscis worm, Parborlasia corrugata, and by the much smaller starfish, Odontaster validus, which hunt in packs.
