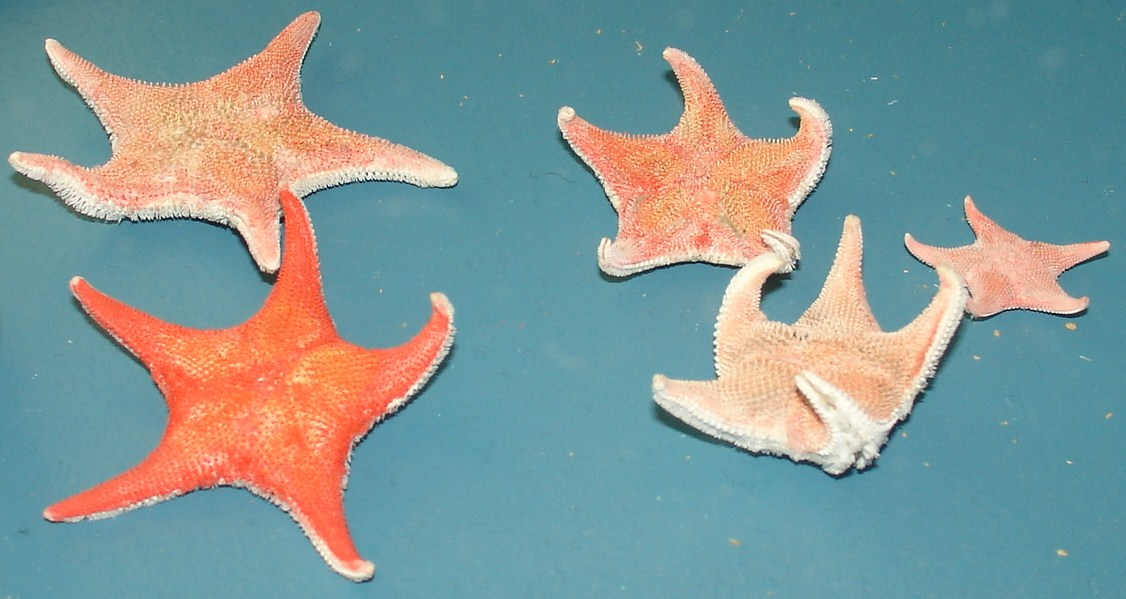

Scientific classification
- Kingdom: Animalia
- Phylum: Echinodermata
- Class: Asteroidea
- Order: Valvatida
- Family: Odontasteridae
- Genus: Odontaster
- Species: O. validus

Binomial name
- Odontaster validus Koehler, 1906

Synonyms
- Cycethra verrucosa Bell, 1908; Gnathaster tenuis (Koehler, 1920); Gnathaster validus Koehler, 1920; Odontaster tenuis Koehler, 1906

= Odontaster validus =

Species of starfish

Odontaster validus is a species of sea star in the family Odontasteridae. Its range includes the Southern Ocean and the seas around the mainland and islands of Antarctica.

== Description ==
Odontaster validus can grow to about 10 cm (4 in) in diameter. The disc is broad, thick and cushion-like, creased by interambulacral grooves. There is a large madreporite near the centre and the surface is covered in small granulations organised in radial rows. The five short arms are wide at the base tapering sharply and the tip is often raised off the substrate showing the pale coloured tube feet beneath. The colour of the upper or aboral surface is plain red while the underside is pink.

== Distribution ==
Odontaster validus is the most common sea star found in Antarctica. Its range includes the Antarctic Peninsula, the South Shetland Islands, the South Orkney Islands, South Georgia and the South Sandwich Islands, the Shag Rocks, the Prince Edward Islands and Bouvet Island. It is found at depths down to 900 metres.

== Biology ==
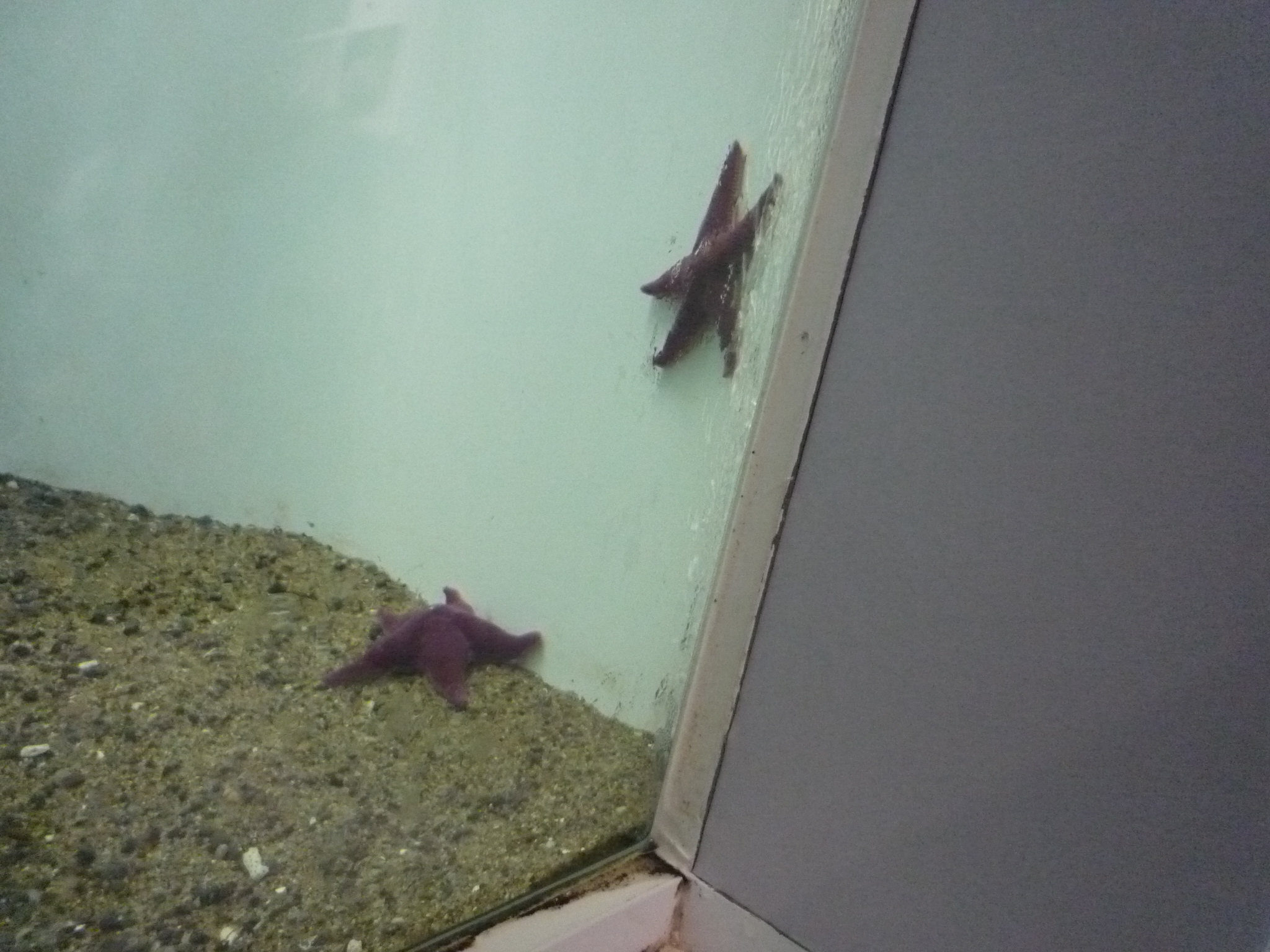
Odontaster validus in Tokyo Sea Life Park

Odontaster validus is an omnivorous scavenger and consumes anything it finds including carrion, detritus, the faeces of seals, red algae, bivalve shells, sponges, hydroids, other sea star, sea urchins, isopods, bryozoans, amphipods, crustacean larvae, ostracods, shrimps and diatoms. They have been observed aggregating on banks of mussels that have been exposed and damaged and on injured sea star, Acodontaster conspicuus. In turn, they are preyed upon by sea anemones and other species of sea star. It is an ecologically important species because of its consumption of benthic larvae and the control it exerts on the sea star Acodontaster conspicuus and the nudibranch Doris spp. which themselves tend to limit the growth of sponges that tend to dominate the seabed.

Odontaster validus takes 3 to 6 years to reach maturity but may live for 100 years. This is a consequence of the animal being cold-blooded, the harsh environmental conditions in which it lives and the low metabolic rate that ensues. In McMurdo Sound, where it has been extensively studied, the water temperature is about −1.8 °C (28.8 °F). The initiation of oogenesis occurs from August to February and the eggs take about 18 months to mature. Spawning takes place between May and September and may be linked to seasonal changes in light levels, sunrise taking place in McMurdo Sound in August. The larval development is also slow with the first, bipinnaria, stage lasting 2 months. The larvae remain near the seabed during this time but become pelagic for up to 6 months as brachiolaria larvae which allows them to disperse widely. They then return to the seabed, undergo metamorphosis and develop into juvenile sea star.

== Research ==
Odontaster validus does not attack members of its own species but can attack sea star of other species. This seems to be due to chemoreceptors which can identify conspecifics by their odour. Sea star often converge on food sources and a study was undertaken to examine how they do this. It was found that food-deprived individual Odontaster validus could distinguish between the odours emitted by satiated and by starved sea star of the same species. They were strongly attracted to the former and took little notice of the latter.

Odontaster validus is much less sensitive to higher water temperatures than the other Antarctic marine species on which it feeds which mostly find temperatures above 3 °C lethal. Even when not killed at higher temperatures, many organisms cease to feed, may remain immobile or fail to reproduce and others started metabolising anaerobically. A study was undertaken to examine the implications of this for the Antarctic marine environment if water temperatures rise as a result of global warming.

Another research study examined the parameters required for successful fertilisation of the eggs of Odontaster validus compared to similar temperate water sea stars. It was found that a density of sperm of 105 sperm per millilitre was sufficient to cause a high proportion of eggs to be fertilised and that this was at least ten times the density required by comparable species in less harsh environments. The sperm still retained a minimal fertilisation ability after 24 hours but had a narrow tolerance to variations in water temperature.
