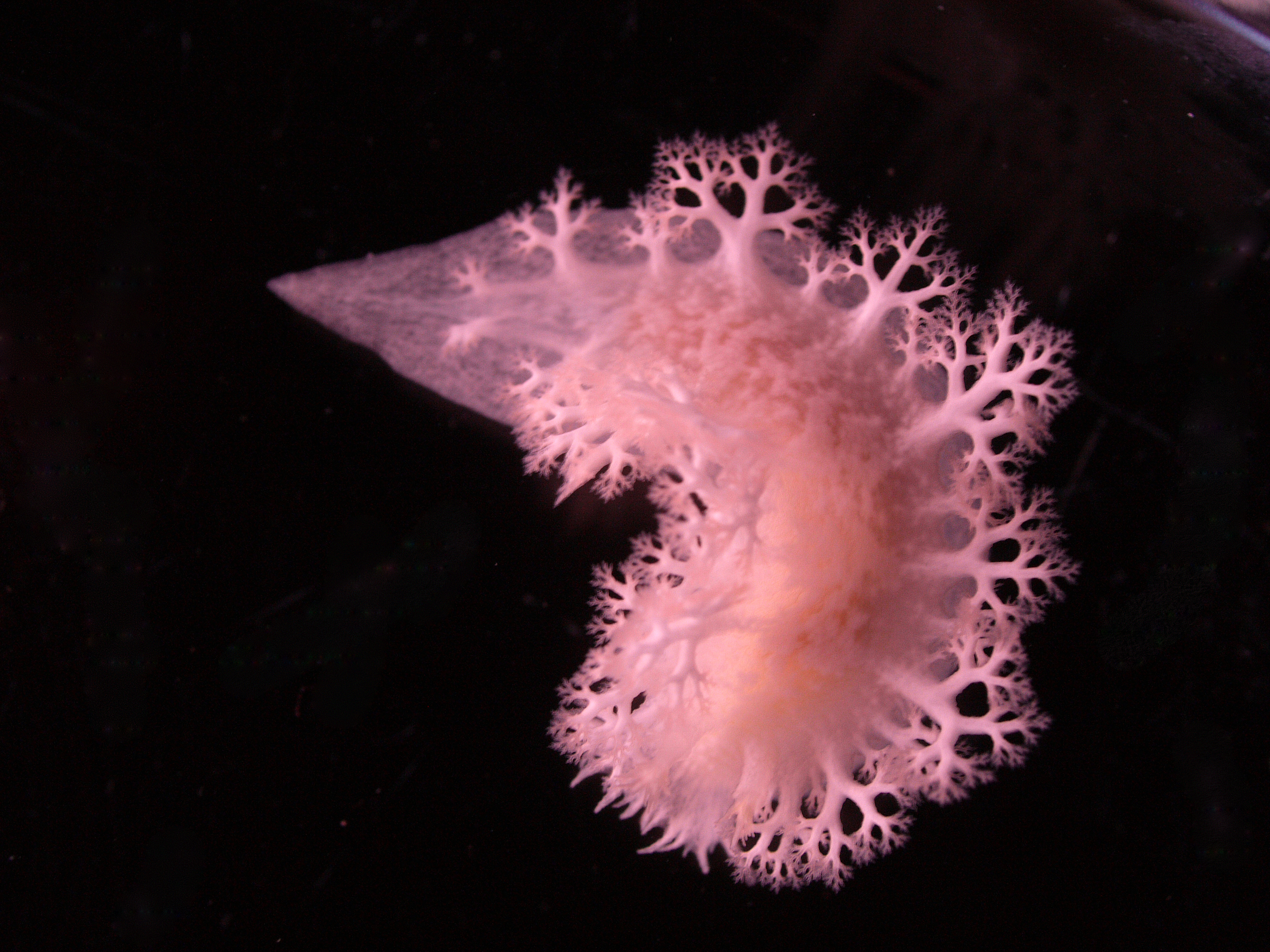
- Tritoniopsis elegans

Scientific classification
- Kingdom: Animalia
- Phylum: Mollusca
- Class: Gastropoda
- Order: Nudibranchia
- Suborder: Tritoniacea
- Family: Tritoniidae
- Genus: Tritoniopsis; Eliot, 1905

Species
- See text

= Tritoniopsis (gastropod) =

Genus of gastropods

Tritoniopsis is a genus of sea slugs, specifically dendronotid nudibranchs. It is a marine gastropod mollusc in the family Tritoniidae.

== Species ==
Species in the genus Tritoniopsis include:

- Tritoniopsis brucei Eliot, 1905 - type species of the Genus
- Tritoniopsis cincta (Pruvot-Fol, 1937)
- Tritoniopsis elegans (Audouin in Savigny, 1826)
- Tritoniopsis frydis Er. Marcus & Ev. Marcus, 1970

Species brought into synonymy

- Tritoniopsis alba (Baba, 1949): synonym of Tritoniopsis elegans (Audouin, 1826)
- Tritoniopsis gravieri Vayssière, 1912: synonym of Tritoniopsis elegans (Audouin, 1826)
