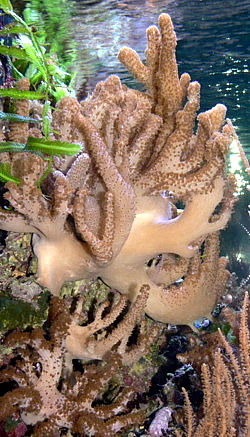
- Cladiella sp.

Scientific classification
- Kingdom: Animalia
- Phylum: Cnidaria
- Subphylum: Anthozoa
- Class: Octocorallia
- Order: Malacalcyonacea
- Family: Cladiellidae
- Genus: Cladiella; Gray, 1869

= Cladiella =

Genus of corals

Cladiella is a genus of soft corals native to the Indo-Pacific region. These corals are commonly known as colt corals or finger leather corals and are often kept in reef aquaria. They grow fast, have short rounded or conical lobes and are sticky to the touch owing to the production of much mucus. They are creamy or pale grey in colour. The polyps are fully retractable and give the colony a fluffy look when extended. They may be a contrasting green or brown hue.

== Species ==
The World Register of Marine Species lists the following species:

- Cladiella arborea (Utinomi, 1954)
- Cladiella arbusculoides Verseveldt & Benayahu, 1978
- Cladiella aspera Tixier-Durivault, 1970
- Cladiella australis (Macfadyen, 1936)
- Cladiella bottai (Tixier-Durivault, 1943)
- Cladiella brachyclados Ehrenberg, 1834
- Cladiella ceylonica (Pratt, 1905)
- Cladiella conifera (Tixier-Durivault, 1943)
- Cladiella crassa (Tixier-Durivault, 1943)
- Cladiella daphnae van Ofwegen & Benayahu, 1992
- Cladiella densa Tixier-Durivault, 1970
- Cladiella devaneyi Verseveldt, 1977
- Cladiella digitulatum (Klunzinger, 1877)
- Cladiella dollfusi (Tixier-Durivault, 1943)
- Cladiella echinata (Tixier-Durivault, 1943)
- Cladiella elegantissima (May, 1899)
- Cladiella elongata (Tixier-Durivault, 1944)
- Cladiella exigua (Tixier-Durivault, 1944)
- Cladiella foliacea (Tixier-Durivault, 1944)
- Cladiella germaini (Tixier-Durivault, 1942)
- Cladiella globulifera (Klunzinger, 1877)
- Cladiella globuliferoides (Thomson & Dean, 1931)
- Cladiella gracilis (Tixier-Durivault, 1944)
- Cladiella hartogi Benayahu & Chou, 2010
- Cladiella hicksoni (Tixier-Durivault, 1944)
- Cladiella hirsuta Tixier-Durivault, 1970
- Cladiella humesi Verseveldt, 1974
- Cladiella irregularis (Tixier-Durivault, 1944)
- Cladiella kashmani Benayahu & Schleyer, 1996
- Cladiella klunzingeri Thomson & Simpson, 1909
- Cladiella krempfi (Hickson, 1919)
- Cladiella kukenthali (Tixier-Durivault, 1942)
- Cladiella laciniosa (Tixier-Durivault, 1944)
- Cladiella latissima (Tixier-Durivault, 1944)
- Cladiella letourneuxi (Tixier-Durivault, 1944)
- Cladiella lineata (Tixier-Durivault, 1944)
- Cladiella madagascarensis (Tixier-Durivault, 1944)
- Cladiella michelini (Tixier-Durivault, 1944)
- Cladiella minuta (Tixier-Durivault, 1944)
- Cladiella multiloba Tixier-Durivault, 1970
- Cladiella pachyclados (Klunzinger, 1877)
- Cladiella papillosa Tixier-Durivault, 1942
- Cladiella pauciflora Ehrenberg, 1834
- Cladiella prattae (Tixier-Durivault, 1944)
- Cladiella pulchra (Tixier-Durivault, 1944)
- Cladiella ramosa Tixier-Durivault, 1970
- Cladiella rotundata Tixier-Durivault, 1970
- Cladiella scabra Tixier-Durivault, 1970
- Cladiella similis (Tixier-Durivault, 1944)
- Cladiella sphaerophora (Ehrenberg, 1834)
- Cladiella steineri Verseveldt, 1982
- Cladiella studeri (Tixier-Durivault, 1944)
- Cladiella subtilis Tixier-Durivault, 1970
- Cladiella suezensis (Tixier-Durivault, 1944)
- Cladiella tenuis (Tixier-Durivault, 1944)
- Cladiella thomsoni (Tixier-Durivault, 1944)
- Cladiella tualerensis (Tixier-Durivault, 1944)
- Cladiella tuberculoides (Tixier-Durivault, 1944)
- Cladiella tuberculosa (Quoy & Gaimard, 1833)
- Cladiella tuberosa (Tixier-Durivault, 1944)
- Cladiella variabilis (Tixier-Durivault, 1944)
