= Cladiella elegantissima =

Scientific classification
- Kingdom: Animalia
- Phylum: Cnidaria
- Subphylum: Anthozoa
- Class: Octocorallia
- Order: Malacalcyonacea
- Family: Cladiellidae
- Genus: Cladiella
- Species: C. elegantissima

Binomial name
- Cladiella elegantissima (May, 1899)

Species of coral

Cladiella elegantissima is a species of soft corals in the genus Cladiella from New Caledonia.
