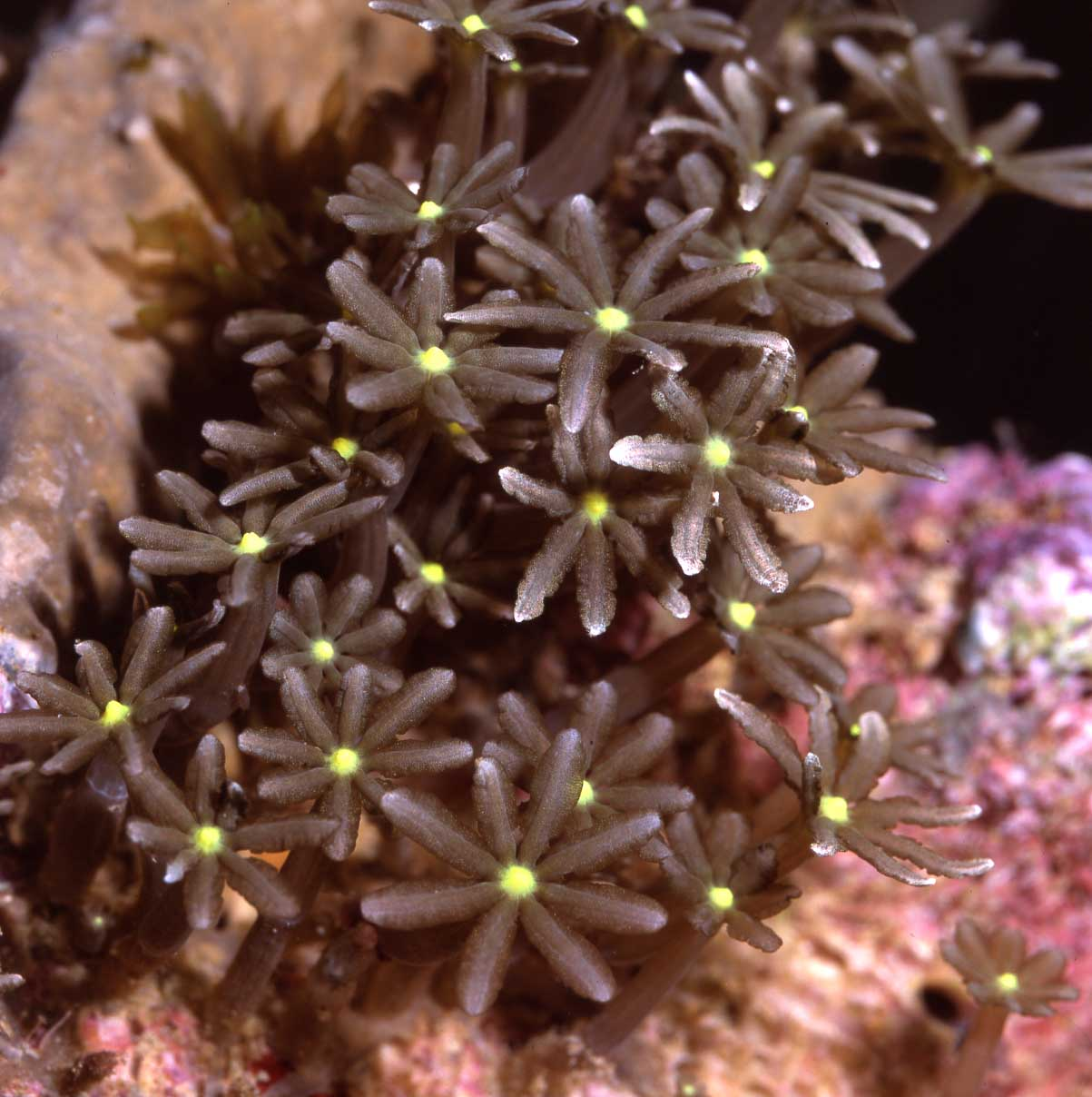
- Knopia octocontacanalis

Scientific classification
- Kingdom: Animalia
- Phylum: Cnidaria
- Subphylum: Anthozoa
- Class: Octocorallia
- Order: Malacalcyonacea
- Family: Clavulariidae
- Genus: Knopia; Alderslade & McFadden, 2007
- Species: K. octocontacanalis

Binomial name
- Knopia octocontacanalis Alderslade & McFadden, 2007

= Knopia =

Genus of corals

Knopia is a monotypic genus of corals belonging to the family Clavulariidae. The only species is Knopia octocontacanalis.

The species is found in Indonesia South Java Sea, Makasar Strait, Bali and Lombok.
