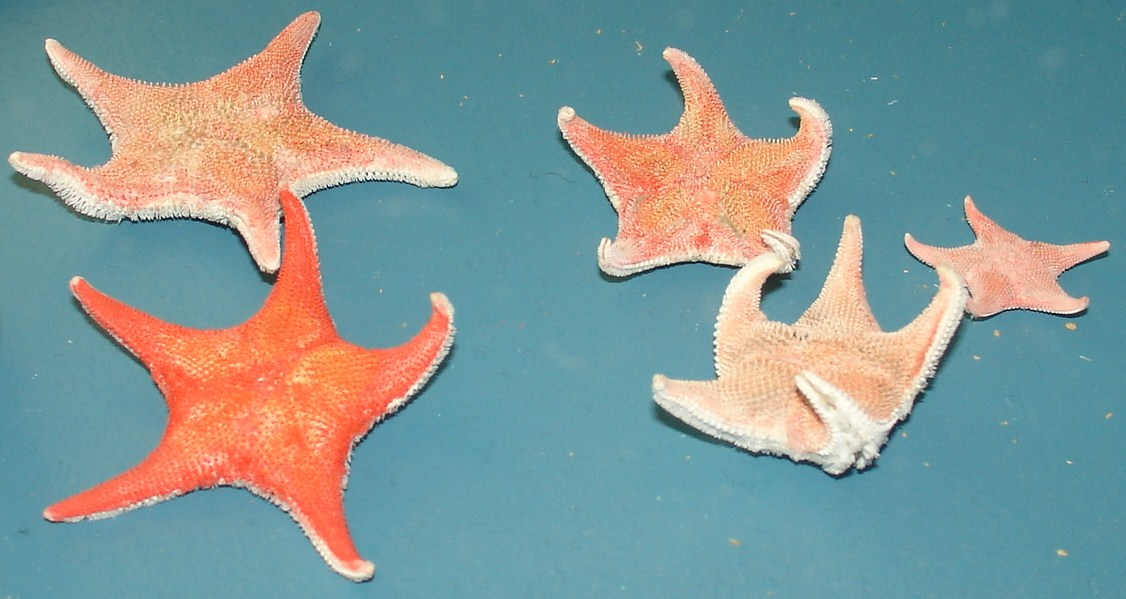
- Odontaster validus

Scientific classification
- Kingdom: Animalia
- Phylum: Echinodermata
- Class: Asteroidea
- Order: Valvatida
- Family: Odontasteridae
- Genus: Odontaster; Verrill, 1880

Species
- See text.

Synonyms
- Asterodon Perrier, 1891; Epidontaster Koehler, 1920; Gnathaster Sladen, 1889; Gnathodon Verrill, 1899 (non G.B.Sowerby I, 1832: preoccupied); Gymnognathaster Döderlein, 1928; Peridontaster Koehler, 1920

= Odontaster =

Genus of starfishes

Odontaster is a genus of sea stars. The type species is Odontaster hispidus.

== Species ==
The following species are listed in the World Register of Marine Species:

- Odontaster aucklandensis McKnight, 1973
- Odontaster australis H.L. Clark, 1926
- Odontaster benhami (Mortensen, 1925)
- Odontaster crassus Fisher, 1905
- Odontaster hispidus Verrill, 1880
- Odontaster mediterraneus (Marenzeller, 1893)
- Odontaster meridionalis (E.A. Smith, 1876)
- Odontaster pearsei Janosik & Halanych, 2010
- Odontaster penicillatus (Philippi, 1870)
- Odontaster robustus Verrill, 1899
- Odontaster rosagemmae McKnight, 2001
- Odontaster roseus Janosik & Halanych, 2010
- Odontaster setosus (Verrill, 1899)
- Odontaster validus Koehler, 1906
