= Tritoniella belli =

Scientific classification
- Kingdom: Animalia
- Phylum: Mollusca
- Class: Gastropoda
- Order: Nudibranchia
- Suborder: Tritoniacea
- Family: Tritoniidae
- Genus: Tritoniella
- Species: T. belli

Binomial name
- Tritoniella belli Eliot, 1907

Synonyms
- Tritoniella sinuata Eliot, 1907

Species of mollusc

Tritoniella belli is a species of the nudibranch genus Tritoniella. The species was described together with its synonym Tritoniella sinuata in 1907 by the British diplomat and malacologist Charles Eliot. It is found in the Southern Ocean along the coast of Antarctica and along the southern parts of the Scotia Arc in depths between 5 m (20 ft) and 700 m (2,300 ft).

== Synonymy ==
Tritoniella sinuata was synonymized by Wägele in 1989 after she found that differentiation by the characters Eliot described was impossible. She argued, that differences between specimens were caused by fixation and individual variability.
