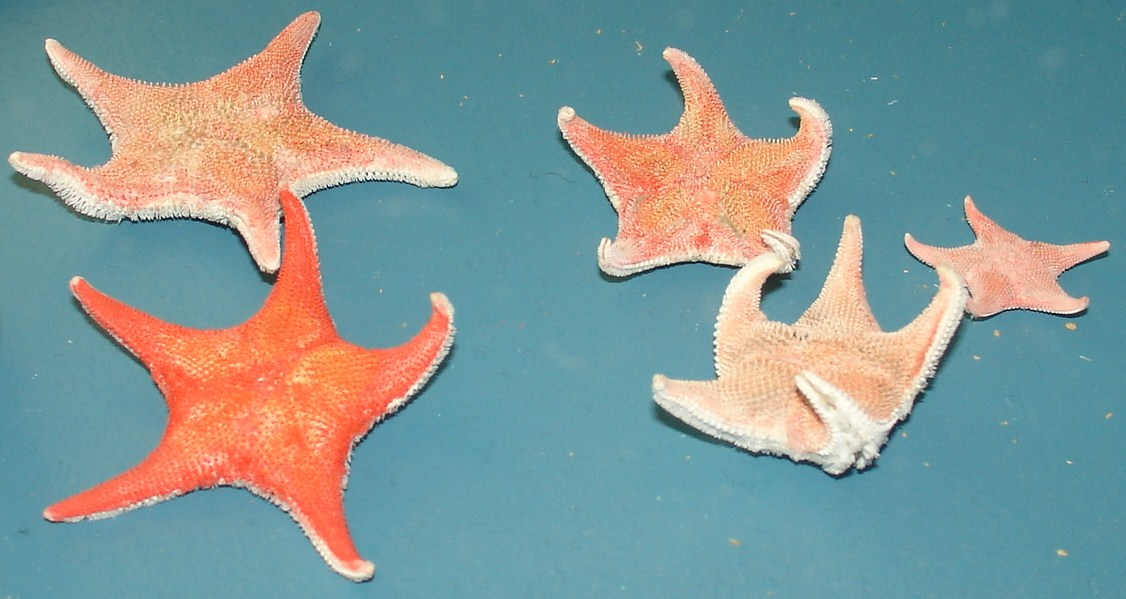
- Odontaster validus

Scientific classification
- Kingdom: Animalia
- Phylum: Echinodermata
- Class: Asteroidea
- Order: Valvatida
- Family: Odontasteridae; Verrill, 1899

Genera
- 6, see text

Synonyms
- Gnathasteridae Koehler, 1924

= Odontasteridae =

Family of starfishes

Odontasteridae is a family of sea stars. Members of the family are known as cushion stars and have relatively broad discs and five short tapering arms.

== Genera ==
The following genera are listed in the World Register of Marine Species:

- Acodontaster Verrill, 1899
- Diabocilla McKnight, 2006
- Diplodontias Fisher, 1908
- Eurygonias Farquhar, 1913
- Hoplaster Perrier, in Milne-Edwards, 1882
- Odontaster Verrill, 1880
