= Chimyl alcohol =

Names
- IUPAC name 3-hexadecoxypropane-1,2-diol
- Other names chimylic alcohol, 1-O-hexadecyl glycerol

Identifiers
CAS Number	6145-69-3 racemic; 506-03-6 S-enantiomer (see image)
3D model (JSmol)	Interactive image
ChEBI	CHEBI:76061
ChEMBL	ChEMBL142186
ChemSpider	65572
ECHA InfoCard	100.025.591
EC Number	228-149-9
KEGG	C13859
PubChem CID	72733
UNII	P9FNL3D0MN
CompTox Dashboard (EPA)	DTXSID80862067
- InChI: InChI=1S/C19H40O3/c1-2-3-4-5-6-7-8-9-10-11-12-13-14-15-16-22-18-19(21)17-20/h19-21H,2-18H2,1H3 Key: OOWQBDFWEXAXPB-UHFFFAOYSA-N
- SMILES: CCCCCCCCCCCCCCCCOCC(CO)O

Properties
Chemical formula	C_{19}H_{40}O_{3}
Molar mass	316.526 g·mol^{−1}
Appearance	colorless solid
Melting point	62.5–63.5 °C (144.5–146.3 °F; 335.6–336.6 K)
Boiling point	445 °C (833 °F; 718 K)
- Except where otherwise noted, data are given for materials in their standard state (at 25 °C [77 °F], 100 kPa). Infobox references

Chimyl alcohol is an organic compound with the formula HOCH_{2}CH(OH)CH_{2}OC_{16}H_{33}. It is a colorless solid. Chimyl alcohol is a monoether formed by condensation of cetyl alcohol with one of the two primary alcohol sites of glycerol. Together with S-selachyl alcohol and S-batyl alcohol, S-chimyl alcohol is a component of some lipid membranes. It is found in the liver of the shark Centrophorus squamosus. The name chimyl is derived from a classification of ratfish, order Chimaeriformes. Like other glyceryl ethers, those derived from chimyl alcohol are not saponifiable.
