= Sydney J. Hickson =

British zoologist (1859–1940)

Sydney John Hickson FRS
- Born: 25 June 1859; Highgate, London
- Died: 6 February 1940 (aged 80); Cambridge
- Occupation: Zoologist

Sydney John Hickson FRS (25 June 1859 – 6 February 1940), was a British zoologist known for his groundbreaking research in evolution, embryology, genetics, and systematics.

Hickson travelled in the Malay archipelago in 1885–1886. He was appointed Professor of Zoology at the University of Manchester in 1894 and was elected FRS in 1895. The Manchester Museum has many specimens of coral that came from Sydney Hickson, a specialist on corals. These include a number of type specimens of names published by Hickson and others, including Stanley Gardiner. Hickson's papers are held at the University of Manchester Library. Hickson was President of the Manchester Literary and Philosophical Society from 1915 to 1917.

He collected plants in Indonesia, Mexico, and Arizona. His botanical specimens are stored at Kew Gardens.

Hickson's daughter Sylvia Kema Hickson (married name Guthrie) became a paediatrician in Manchester.

== Selected works ==
- A naturalist in north Celebes. J. Murray. 1889.
- The fauna of the deep sea. Modern science, ed. By Sir John Lubbock. K. Paul, Trench, Trubner & co. 1894.
- The story of life in the seas. Newnes. 1901.

Professional and academic associations
Preceded by Francis Nicholson	President of the Manchester Literary and Philosophical Society; 1915–17	Succeeded by William Thomson
