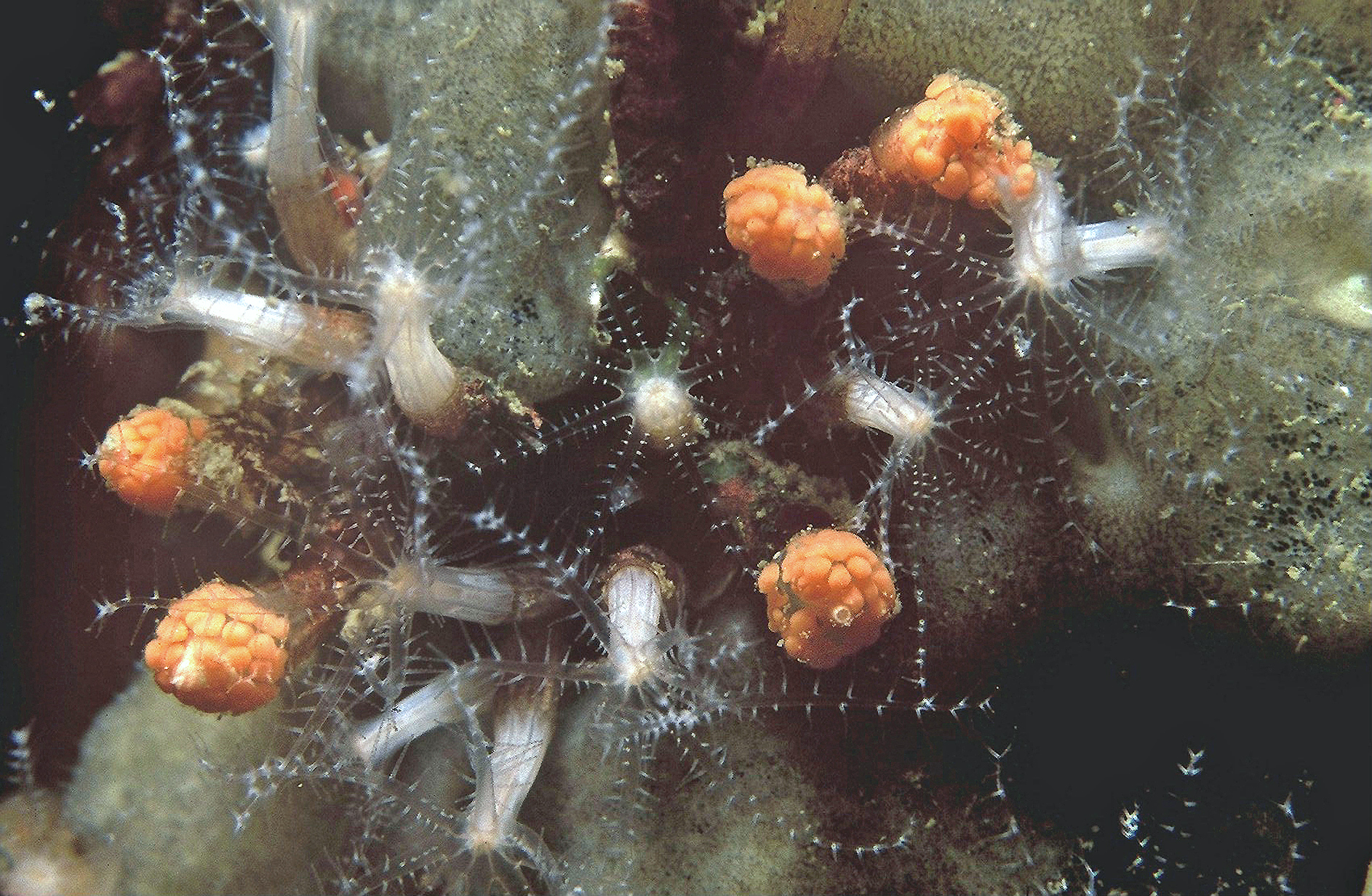
- Clavularia crassa with eggs

Scientific classification
- Kingdom: Animalia
- Phylum: Cnidaria
- Subphylum: Anthozoa
- Class: Octocorallia
- Order: Malacalcyonacea
- Family: Clavulariidae; Hickson, 1894

Genera
- See text

= Clavulariidae =

Family of corals

Clavulariidae is a family of soft corals in the order Malacalcyonacea. Colonies in this family consist of separate retractable polyps growing from a horizontal, encrusting stolon or basal membrane. The tissues are stiffened by sclerites.

== Genera ==
The World Register of Marine Species includes the following genera in the family:

- Clavularia Blainville, 1830
- Hanabira Lau, Stokvis, Imahara & Reimer, 2019
- Knopia Alderslade & McFadden, 2007

Before a 2022 taxonomic revision of Octocorallia, the following genera were also included:

- Azoriella (Lopez Gonzalez & Gili, 2001)
- Bathytelesto Bayer, 1981
- Carijoa F. Mueller, 1867
- Cryptophyton Williams, 2000
- Cyathopodium Verrill, 1868
- Denhartogia Ocaña & van Ofwegen, 2003
- Inconstantia McFadden & van Ofwegen, 2012
- Incrustatus van Ofwegen, Häussermann & Försterra, 2007
- Moolabalia Alderslade, 2001
- Paratelesto Utinomi, 1958
- Phenganax Alderslade & McFadden, 2011
- Pseudocladochonus Versluys, 1907
- Rhodelinda Bayer, 1981
- Rolandia de Lacaze-Duthiers, 1900
- Sarcodictyon Forbes (in Johnston), 1847
- Schizophytum Studer, 1891
- Scleranthelia Studer, 1878
- Scyphopodium Bayer, 1981
- Stereosoma Hickson, 1930
- Stereotelesto Bayer, 1981
- Telesto Lamouroux, 1812
- Telestula Madsen, 1944
- Tesseranthelia Bayer, 1981
