= Acanthopathes undulata =

Scientific classification
- Kingdom: Animalia
- Phylum: Cnidaria
- Subphylum: Anthozoa
- Class: Hexacorallia
- Order: Antipatharia
- Family: Aphanipathidae
- Genus: Acanthopathes
- Species: A. undulata

Binomial name
- Acanthopathes undulata van Pesch, 1914

Species of marine animal

Acanthopathes undulata, also called black coral, is a species of marine animal under the phylum Cnidaria, making it closely related to other corals, sea anemones, and jellyfish. Acanthopathes undulata belongs to the Anthozoa subphylum. The class Hexacorallia and the order Antipatharia. Antipatharia is commonly used in jewelry and for various medicinal applications.

== Description ==
Acanthopathes undulata is found in the Indo-Pacific, specifically in the Hawaiian Archipelago and the Mariana Islands. Acanthopathes undulata exists at depths ranging from 30 to 269 meters in Hawaiian waters and 115 to 146 meters in the Mariana Islands. Black corals have a proteinaceous, dark skeleton called antipathin.

Black corals are known for being reliable indicators to monitor ocean health and ecosystem changes. Because of their importance in the structure of deep-sea reefs, black corals are vital in promoting biodiversity in deep-sea environments.

== Taxonomy and classification ==
Acanthopathes undulata was first described by Adrianus Jacobus van Pesch in 1914. Acanthopathes undulata was originally placed in the genus Antipathes (Aphanipathes) but was later moved to the genus Acanthopathes within the family Aphanpathidae. Acanthopathes undulata is most closely related to A. humilis, A. somervillei, and A. thyoides.

== Morphology ==
Acanthopathes undulata consists of a branching, fan-shaped colony of animals that can grow up to 0.5 meters in height. The branching consists of short, distally curved branchlets with terminal branches around 0.5 centimeters. Branching can be uniserial or bilateral, and polyp development can occur on both sides.

Acanthopathes undulata skeletons are dark and proteinaceous rather than composed of calcium carbonate. Their skeletons consist of short, slender spines that are unequal in size. The skeleton of Acanthopathes polypar spines that are larger in size than the abpolypar spines. Polypar spines are specially designed skeletal structures of the order Antipatharia that are located on the same side of the branch as its polyps.

The polyps of Acanthopathes undulata are radially symmetrical and 0.5 to 1.0 millimeters in diameter. The polyps are arranged in a single row and possess six non-retractile tentacles. Polyps are spaced about 1.26 millimeters and distributed at 8 polyps per centimeter.

Acanthopathes undulata feeds by gathering plankton from its surrounding water. The shape of the coral maximized surface area to gather as much food as possible in low-light environments. Acanthopathes undulata tend to live on hard substrates and are adapted to thrive in highly specific currents to support their feeding strategy. While Acanthopathes undulata possesses algal symbionts, it does not rely solely on symbiotic algae for energy.

== Distribution and habitat ==
Acanthopathes undulata was originally described in Indonesia at a depth of 113 meters, but is now found in the Indian and Pacific oceans, near the Hawaiian, Mariana, and Daito Islands. Acanthopathes undulata are benthic deep-sea invertebrates living at depths between 30 and 269 meters in the Hawaiian Archipelago. In the Mariana Islands, Acanthopathes undulata lives at depths between 115 and 146 meters.

Acanthopathes undulata are preyed upon by specific gastropods and sea turtles. Chelonia mydas, the Green sea turtle, is one of the species known to consume antipatharians. Because Acanthopathes undulata is consumed by few animals, it experiences low levels of predation.

Acanthopathes undulata is crucial to the ecosystems of deep-reef environments in the Indo-Pacific. The organism serves as a foundation for communities of marine invertebrates and fish. Their role in habitat and structure with deep-sea reefs promotes biodiversity in this region. The depths at which Acanthopathes undulata thrives can be dangerous for divers to explore and take collections from, so these regions are often not studied. Acanthopathes undulata also serves as an important example for taxonomic distinctions, such as antipathin, the rigid chitin skeletons of black corals. Acanthopathes undulata are highly sensitive to disturbance, making them notable indicators of environmental changes and the impacts of human activities.
