= Alternatipathes bipinnata =

Scientific classification
- Domain: Eukaryota
- Kingdom: Animalia
- Phylum: Cnidaria
- Class: Hexacorallia
- Order: Antipatharia
- Family: Schizopathidae
- Genus: Alternatipathes
- Species: A. bipinnata

Binomial name
- Alternatipathes bipinnata (Opresko, 2005)

Synonyms
- Umbellapathes bipinnata Opresko, 2005

Species of coral

Alternipathes bipinnata is a coral species in the family Schizopathidae. It has been found off the Pacific coast of Mexico.

== Etymology ==
The generic name, Alternatipathes, is derived from the Latin word alternatus, meaning "alternating", combined with the suffix pathes, which is commonly used for genera belonging to Antipatharia. The name refers to the species' alternating arrangement of pinnules.

The specific epithet is derived from the Latin bipinnata, meaning "two pinnates", in reference to the multiple pinnate branches of the species.
