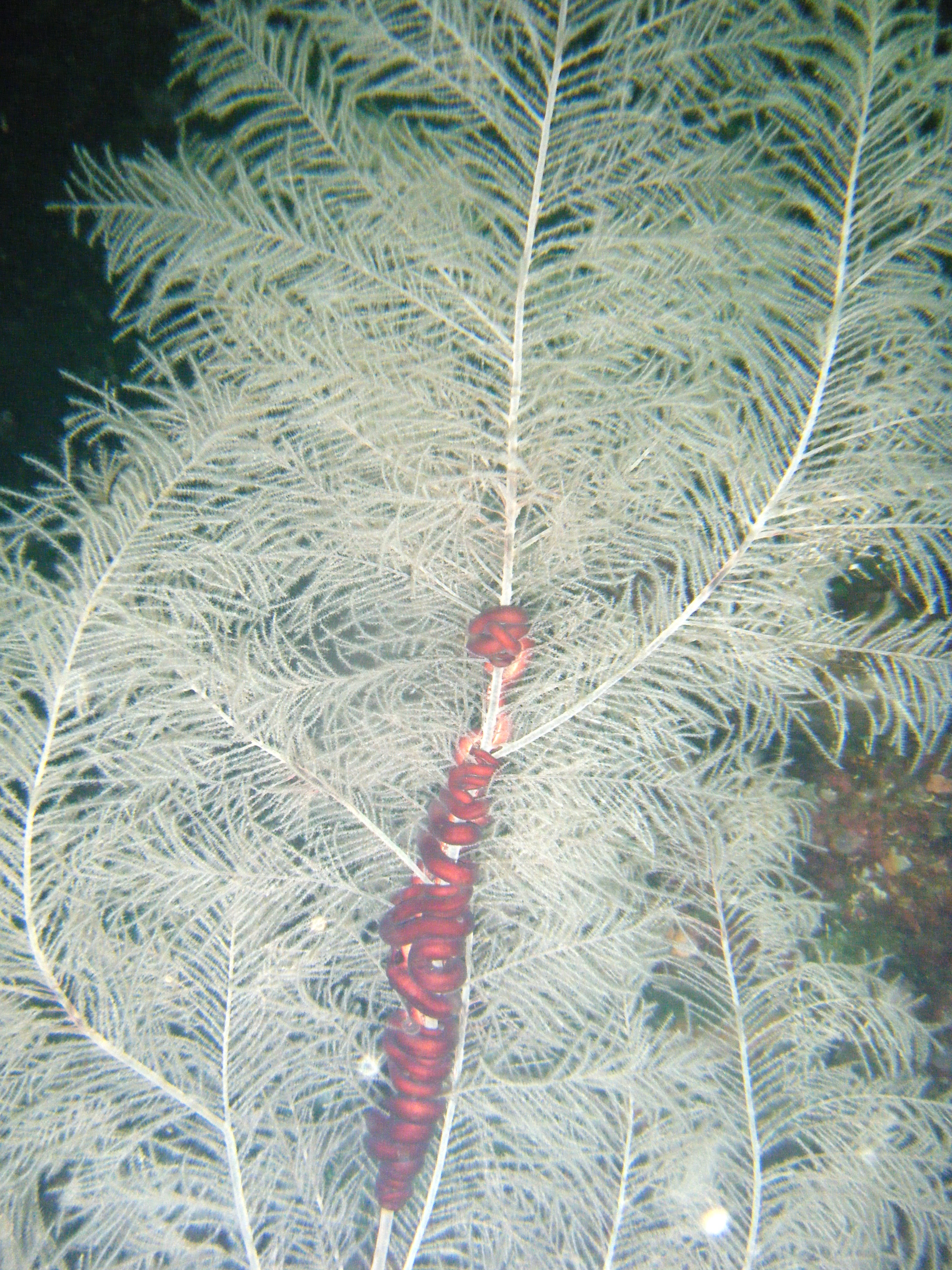
- Antipathella fiordensis (pale) with a basket star (dark) in one of its branches

Conservation status
- Naturally Uncommon (NZ TCS)

Scientific classification
- Kingdom: Animalia
- Phylum: Cnidaria
- Subphylum: Anthozoa
- Class: Hexacorallia
- Order: Antipatharia
- Family: Myriopathidae
- Genus: Antipathella
- Species: A. fiordensis

Binomial name
- Antipathella fiordensis (Grange, 1990)

Synonyms
- Antipathes fiordensis Grange, 1990

= Antipathella fiordensis =

Species of coral

Antipathella fiordensis is a species of colonial coral in the order Antipatharia, the black corals, so named because their calcareous skeletons are black. It was first described as Antipathes fiordensis by the New Zealand zoologist Ken R. Grange in 1990, from material collected in the steep-sided fiords of Fiordland in the southeastern South Island, New Zealand. A 2001 revision of the Antipatheria put this species in the newly created genus Antipathella.

== Distribution ==
Antipathella fiordensis occurs in the seas around New Zealand at depths of from 5 to 100 m (20 to 330 ft).

== Description ==
With a basket star on one branch

Black corals have flexible bushy or tree-like forms. They have black skeletons of dense, horny material, covered by a thin layer of living tissue from which the polyps project. Each polyp has six unbranched tentacles and a slit-shaped mouth, and is non-retractable. Normal tentacles are less than 2 mm (0.1 in) long, but this black coral can develop sweeper tentacles up to 15 mm (0.6 in) long, armed with stinging cells, in apparent response to epiphytic organisms attempting to grow on the branches. These corals do not contain zooxanthellae in their tissues and thus do not need to live in sunlit places.

A. fiordensis has a 50:50 sex ratio, with no obvious differences between the sexes. Colonies do not reach sexual maturity until they are about 0.7–1.0 m tall, aged at least 30 years. Female colonies produce between 1.3 million and nearly 17 million oocytes each year.

== Ecology ==
The fiords where A. fiordensis grows have nearly vertical rock walls, providing limited sites for attachment of organisms, so many other species live on these corals. One is the snake star Astrobrachion constrictum, which perches and coils its arms tightly around the coral's branches. This snake star is found in a number of places around New Zealand, but always in association with a black coral. It seems to be a mutualistic arrangement: coral polyps are more efficient at catching prey than the unbranched arms of a snake star; the snake star appropriates some of the prey, while also cleaning mucus off the coral and preventing epizoic organisms from settling on it.
