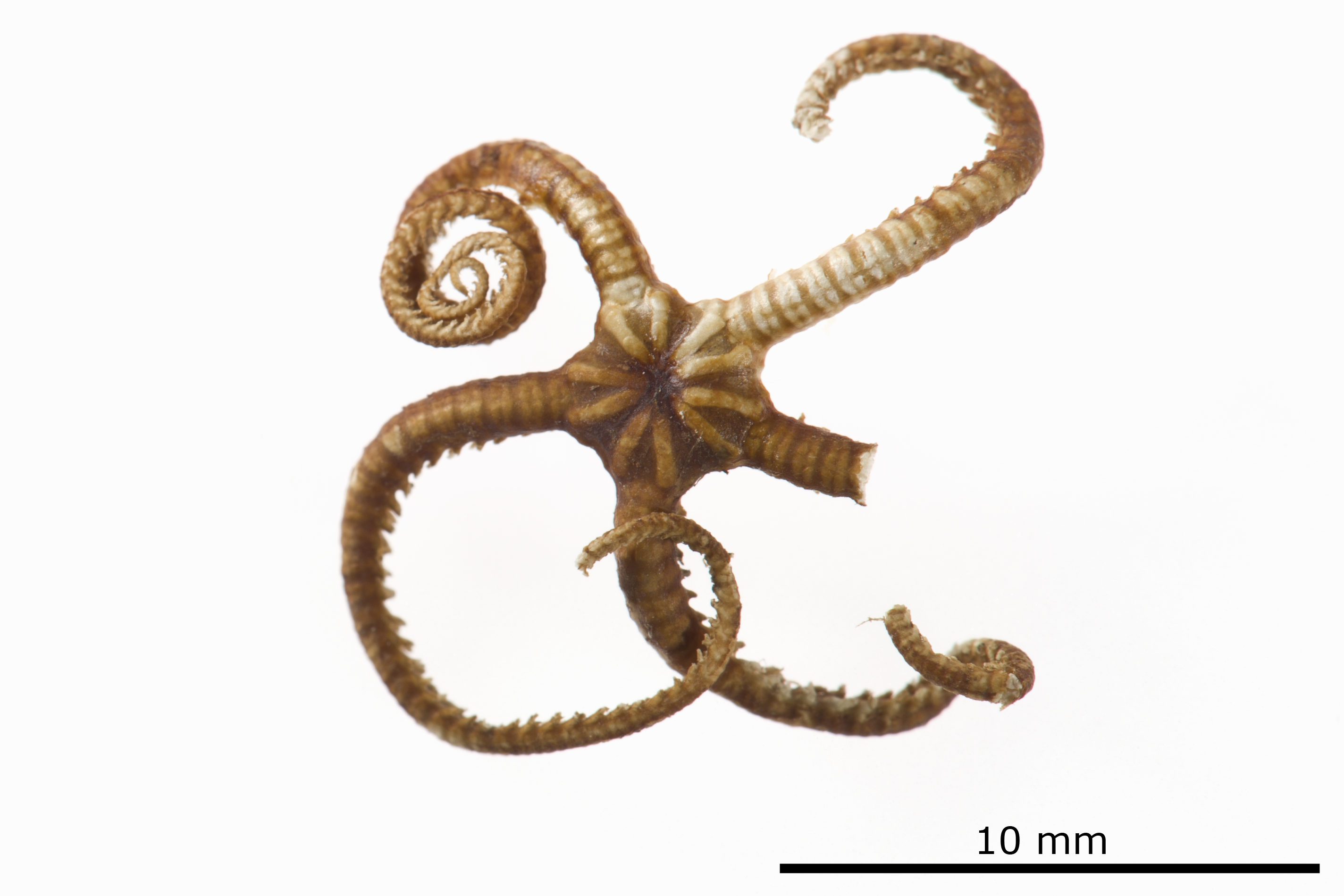

Scientific classification
- Domain: Eukaryota
- Kingdom: Animalia
- Phylum: Echinodermata
- Class: Ophiuroidea
- Order: Phrynophiurida
- Family: Euryalidae
- Genus: Astrobrachion
- Species: A. constrictum

Binomial name
- Astrobrachion constrictum (Farquhar, 1900)

Synonyms
- Ophiocreas constrictum (Farquhar, 1900); Ophiocreas constrictus Farquhar, 1900; Ophiocreas phanerum H.L. Clark, 1916; Ophiuropsis lymani simplex Mortensen, 1933; Ophiuropsis simplex Mortensen, 1933

= Astrobrachion constrictum =

Species of brittle star

Astrobrachion constrictum is a basket star in the family Euryalidae. It is mostly found at depths of between 50 and 180 m (160 and 590 ft), but around the coast of New Zealand it occurs in shallow waters, in association with the black coral Antipathella fiordensis.

== Description ==
Astrobrachion constrictum has a central disc growing to a maximum diameter of 25 mm (1 in), and five slender arms which may reach a length of 50 cm (20 in). The genus is characterised by the lateral arm plates being separated by small ventral plates. The colour is variable, ranging from yellowish-white to red, and the arms have transverse banding. Astrobrachion adhaerens, the only other species in the genus, is smaller and has longitudinal stripes on the arms.

== Distribution ==
The species is endemic to New Zealand and southeastern Australia, and normally occurs at depths of between 50 and 180 m (160 and 590 ft). These depths are too deep for most scuba divers, which makes it difficult to study these basket stars. However, in the Fiordland in the south-western part of the South Island of New Zealand, unique conditions allow them and their black coral hosts to live in shallower waters where they are within the range of divers and more readily studied.

== Ecology ==
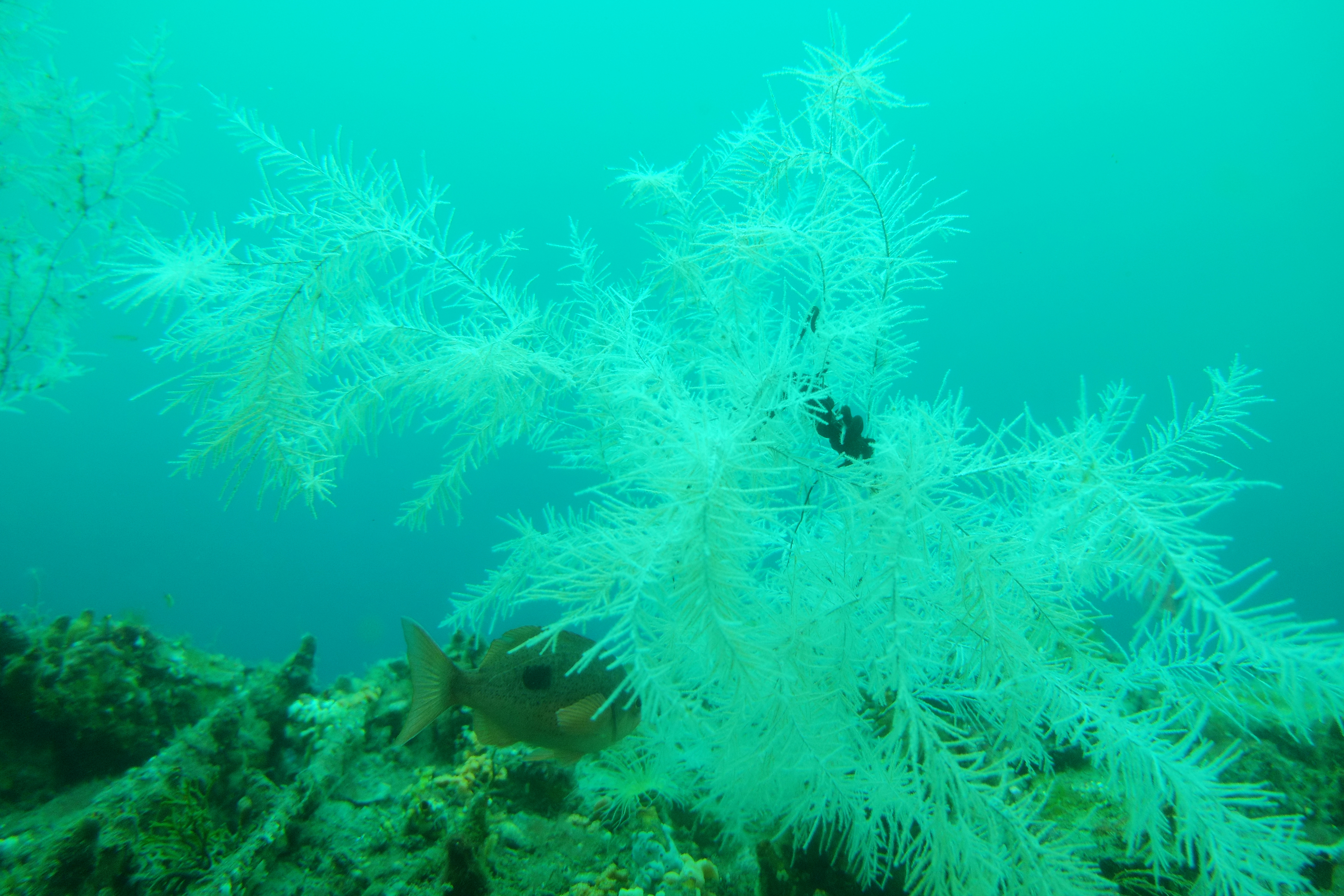
Black coral (pale) with a basket star coiled round a branch

Black corals in the genus Antipathella host A. constrictum in a mutualistic association that seems to be a long-lasting arrangement: the basket stars coil their arms around the coral twigs and remain in the same locality for long periods, and possibly for life. The basket star has been found in a number of locations around New Zealand on the continental shelf but has never been found living freely, or living anywhere except in association with a black coral colony. The basket stars feed at night, uncoiling their arms from the coral and catching organic particles floating past. They also brush their arms against the coral surface and are probably feeding on detritus and any epizoic organisms that settle there. They are slow-growing, reaching their maximum size at approximately eight years of age.
