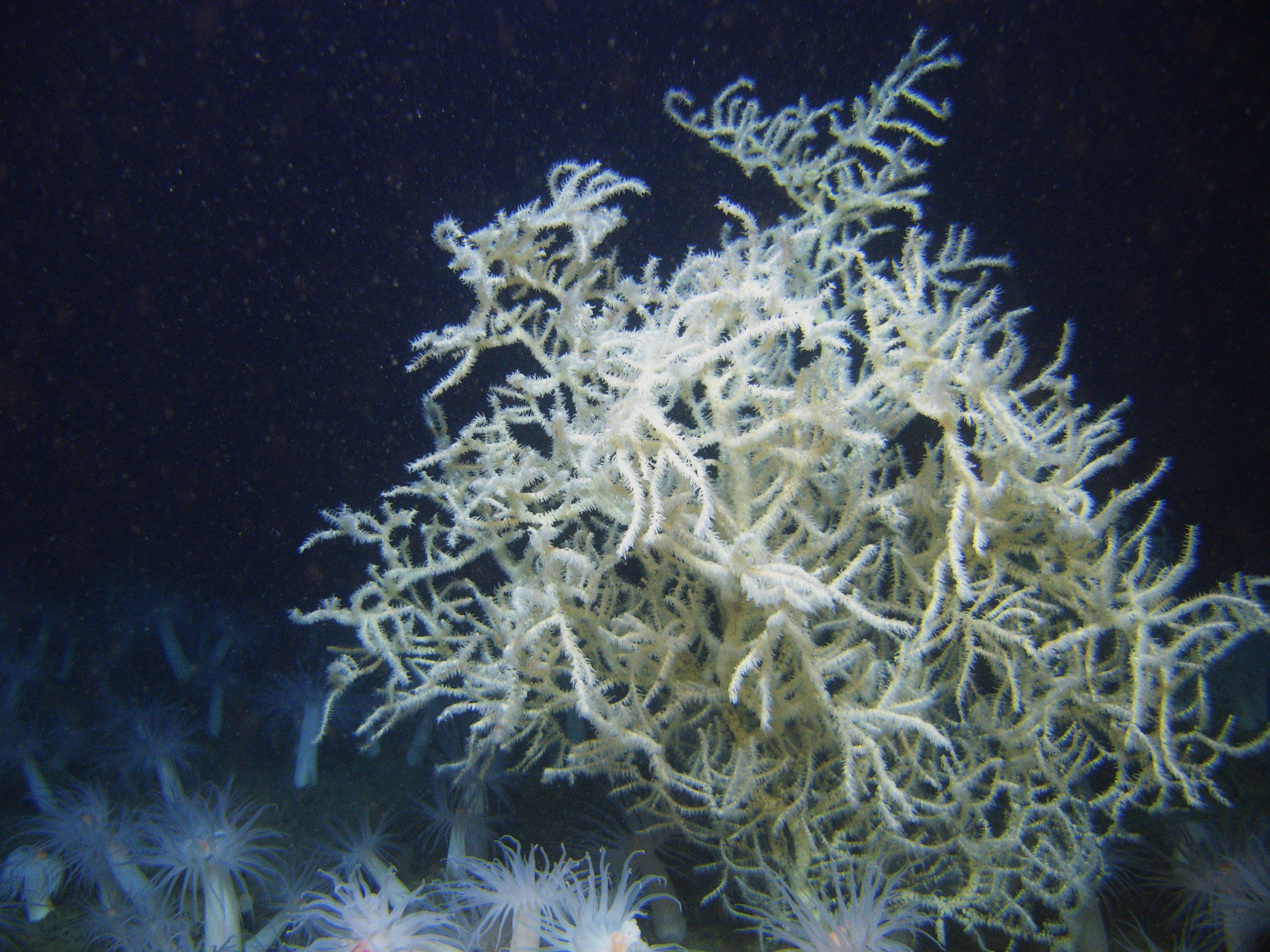

Conservation status
- Endangered (IUCN 3.1) (Mediterranean)

Scientific classification
- Kingdom: Animalia
- Phylum: Cnidaria
- Subphylum: Anthozoa
- Class: Hexacorallia
- Order: Antipatharia
- Family: Leiopathidae
- Genus: Leiopathes
- Species: L. glaberrima

Binomial name
- Leiopathes glaberrima (Esper, 1788)

Synonyms
- Antipathes glaberrima (Esper, 1792)

= Leiopathes glaberrima =

Species of cnidarian

Leiopathes glaberrima is a species of black coral of the order Antipatharia found in the northern Atlantic Ocean and the Mediterranean Seas deep water habitats. A very slow-growing species, it is among the oldest living animals on the planet.

== Description ==
L. glaberrima is an arborescent coral and grows in a sympodial manner; this means that the original axis stops growing after a while, with one or more side branches forking out randomly, only to stop growing as other branches take over. The skeleton is composed of a spiny keratin-like material, laid down in concentric layers. This is overlain by a layer of living tissue from which the polyps project. Each of these has six unbranched, non-retractile tentacles. Mucus coating the surfaces gives rise to the specific epithet glaberrima, "smoothest".

== Distribution ==
The distribution of L. glaberrima is not completely known, but it is present in both the Pacific and Atlantic Oceans. It is present off the coasts of Hawaii where it is collected commercially. It is also present in the Mediterranean Sea off the coast of Malta at depths of between 250 and 400 m (820 and 1,310 ft) where it constitutes a dense coral forest which greatly enhances the biodiversity of the area. It is also known from the northern Gulf of Mexico, where more than one colour form exists.

== Ecology ==
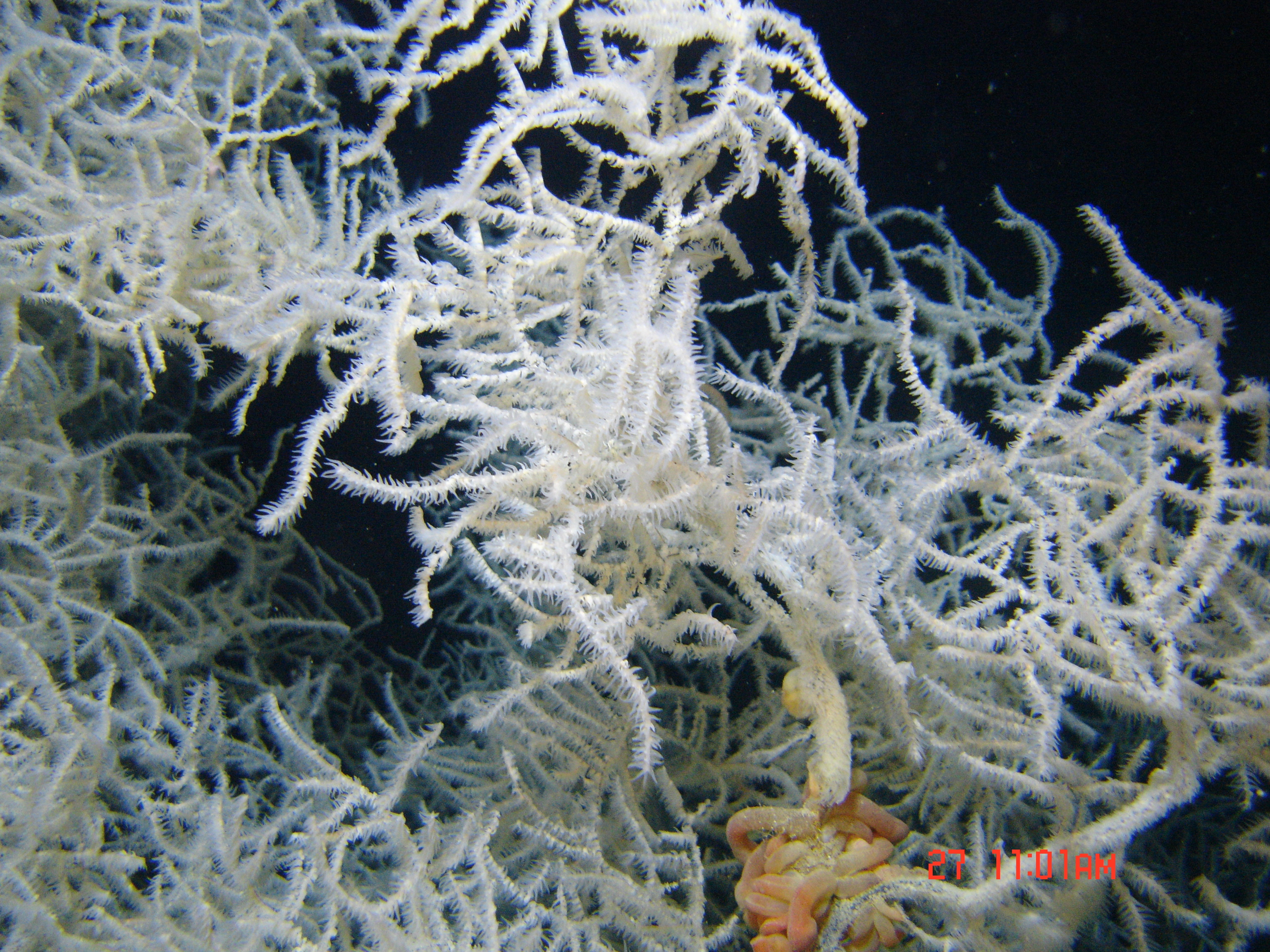
White "black coral". Gooseneck barnacles are attached to a branch in the lower right center.

In the deep waters off Malta in the Mediterranean Sea, Leiopathes glaberrima is the dominant species in what have been called "coral gardens", where it is associated with other scleractinian corals, gorgonians and zoanthids. The areas are characterised by strong turbulent currents and the corals grow on steep rocky terraces. The colonies are typically a metre or more high, with four or five per square metre. The majority of Leiopathes glaberrima colonies have white polyps, but some are orange. Associated animals include soft corals, gorgonians, crabs, stalked barnacles, numerous species of fish, the cushion star Peltaster placenta, squat lobsters and the spiny lobster Palinurus elephas. The ecosystem is easily damaged by deep water fishing activities including trammel nets and long lines which break the colonies or get tangled in them.

Although the feeding habits of this species have not been studied, black corals usually grow in areas with steady currents and are fan-shaped, orientating themselves at right angles to the flow. The polyps tend to be expanded all the time, and the mouth can stretch to three times its normal size to accommodate large prey items such as copepods, amphipods and chaetognaths. The surface of the coral is covered by mucus which can also trap food particles; these are then moved towards a mouth by currents caused by cilia.

This coral is a very slow-growing species, with an estimated growth rate of less than 10 μm per year. A specimen collected from a depth of 450 m (1,500 ft) off Hawaii was estimated by radiocarbon dating in 2006 to have an age of around 2377 years. More recently, another Hawaiian specimen of Leiopathes glaberrima, the central portion of a basal holdfast, was found to have an age of 4265 (±44) years, and is believed to be the oldest recorded marine organism.
