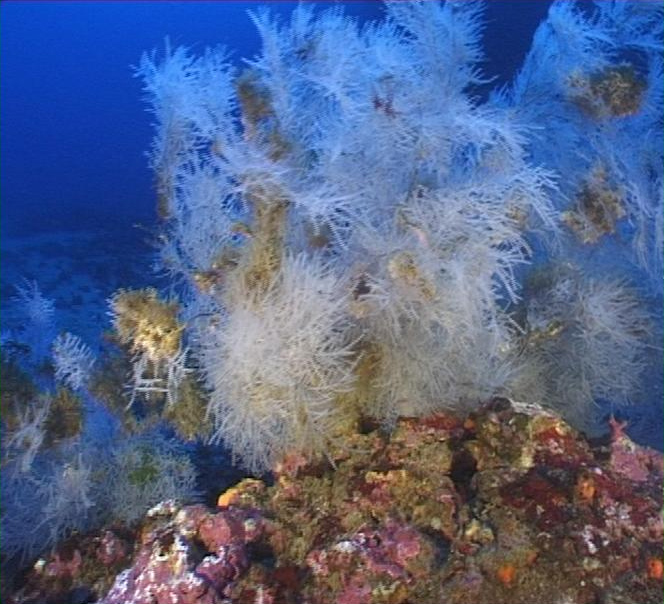
- Antipathella subpinnata from the Strait of Messina.

Scientific classification
- Kingdom: Animalia
- Phylum: Cnidaria
- Subphylum: Anthozoa
- Class: Hexacorallia
- Order: Antipatharia
- Family: Myriopathidae
- Genus: Antipathella; Brook, 1889

= Antipathella =

Genus of corals

Antipathella is a genus of cnidarians belonging to the family Myriopathidae.

The genus has almost cosmopolitan distribution.

Species:

- Antipathella aperta (Totton, 1923)
- Antipathella fiordensis (Grange, 1990)
- Antipathella strigosa Brook, 1889
- Antipathella subpinnata (Ellis & Solander, 1786)
- Antipathella wollastoni (Gray, 1857)
