= Alternatipathes =

Scientific classification
- Kingdom: Animalia
- Phylum: Cnidaria
- Subphylum: Anthozoa
- Class: Hexacorallia
- Order: Antipatharia
- Family: Schizopathidae
- Genus: Alternatipathes; Molodtsova & Opresko, 2017

Species
- Alternatipathes alternata (Brook, 1889); Alternatipathes bipinnata (Opresko, 2005); Alternatipathes mirabilis Opresko & Molodtsova, 2021; Alternatipathes venusta Opresko & Wagner, 2020

Genus of corals

Alternatipathes is a genus of corals belonging to the family Schizopathidae.

== Etymology ==
The generic name, Alternatipathes, is derived from the Latin alternatus, meaning "alternating", and the suffix pathes, which is commonly used for genera belonging to Antipatharia; the name is in reference to the species' alternating arrangement of pinnules.
