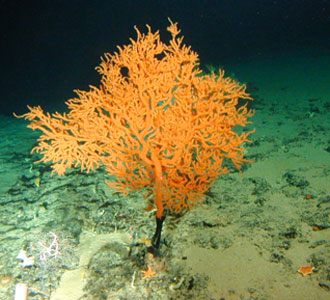
- Leiopathes annosa colony

Scientific classification
- Domain: Eukaryota
- Kingdom: Animalia
- Phylum: Cnidaria
- Subphylum: Anthozoa
- Class: Hexacorallia
- Order: Antipatharia
- Family: Leiopathidae
- Genus: Leiopathes; Haime, 1849

= Leiopathes =

Genus of corals

Leiopathes is a genus of hexacorallians belonging to the anthozoan clade Antipatharia. It is the only genus in the Leiopathidae family. The genus name means "smooth disease".

== Species ==
- Leiopathes acanthophora Opresko, 1998
- Leiopathes annosa Wagner and Opresko, 2015
- Leiopathes bullosa Opresko, 1998
- Leiopathes expansa Johnson, 1899
- Leiopathes glaberrima (Esper, 1788)
- Leiopathes grimaldii Roule, 1902
- Leiopathes montana Molodtsova, 2011
- Leiopathes secunda Opresko, 1998
- Leiopathes valdiviae (Pax, 1915)
