= Stylopathidae =

Scientific classification
- Kingdom: Animalia
- Phylum: Cnidaria
- Subphylum: Anthozoa
- Class: Hexacorallia
- Order: Antipatharia
- Family: Stylopathidae

Family of corals

Stylopathidae is a family of corals belonging to the order Antipatharia.

Genera:

- Stylopathes Opresko, 2006
- Triadopathes Opresko, 2006
- Tylopathes Brook, 1889
