= Acanthopathes =

Scientific classification
- Domain: Eukaryota
- Kingdom: Animalia
- Phylum: Cnidaria
- Class: Hexacorallia
- Order: Antipatharia
- Family: Aphanipathidae
- Genus: Acanthopathes; Opresko, 2004

Species
- Acanthopathes hancocki; Acanthopathes humilis; Acanthopathes somervillei; Acanthopathes thyoides; Acanthopathes undulata

Genus of corals

Acanothopathes is a genus of coral in the family Aphanipathidae that contains five species. Species in this genus are found in the Caribbean Sea, Indian Ocean, and Pacific Ocean in temperatures ranging from about 10 to 30 degrees celsius at depths from 50 to 400 meters.
