= Myriopathes =

Scientific classification
- Kingdom: Animalia
- Phylum: Cnidaria
- Subphylum: Anthozoa
- Class: Hexacorallia
- Order: Antipatharia
- Family: Myriopathidae
- Genus: Myriopathes; Opresko, 2001

Type species
- Antipathes myriophylla Pallas, 1766

Synonyms
- Hydradendrium Carter, 1880

Genus of corals

Myriopathes is a genus of cnidarians belonging to the family Myriopathidae.

== Species ==
The following species are assigned to this genus:

- Myriopathes antrocrada (Opresko, 1999)
- Myriopathes bifaria (Brook, 1889)
- Myriopathes catharinae (Pax, 1932)
- Myriopathes japonica (Brook, 1889)
- Myriopathes lata (Silberfeld, 1909)
- Myriopathes myriophylla (Pallas, 1766)
- Myriopathes panamensis (Verrill, 1869)
- Myriopathes rugosa (Thomson & Simpson, 1905)
- Myriopathes spinosa (Carter, 1880)
- Myriopathes stechowi (Pax, 1932)
- Myriopathes ulex (Ellis & Solander, 1786)
