= Cladopathidae =

Scientific classification
- Kingdom: Animalia
- Phylum: Cnidaria
- Subphylum: Anthozoa
- Class: Hexacorallia
- Order: Antipatharia
- Family: Cladopathidae

Family of corals

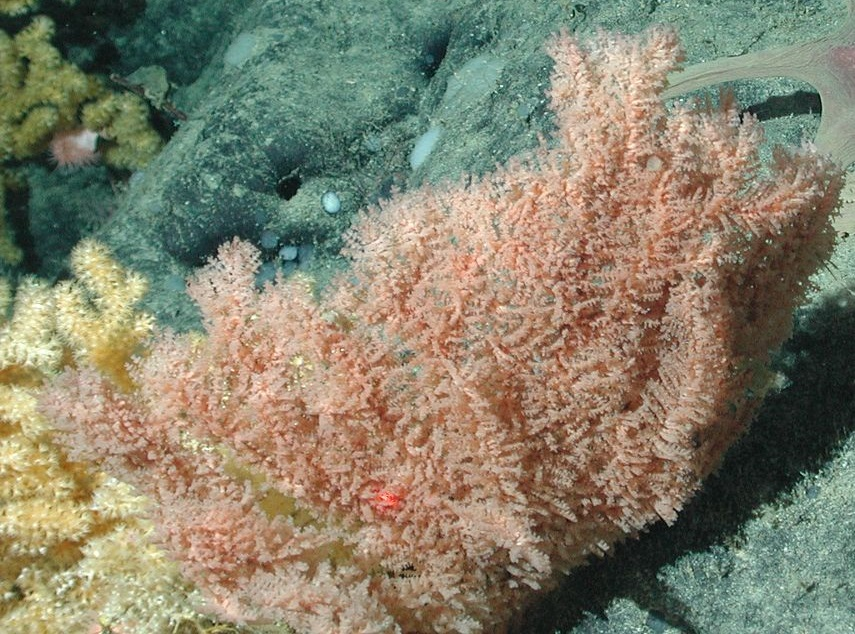

Cladopathidae is a family of cnidarians belonging to the order Antipatharia.

Genera:

- Chrysopathes Opresko, 2003
- Cladopathes Brook, 1889
- Heteropathes Opresko, 2011
- Hexapathes Kinoshita, 1910
- Sibopathes van Pesch, 1914
- Trissopathes Opresko, 2003
