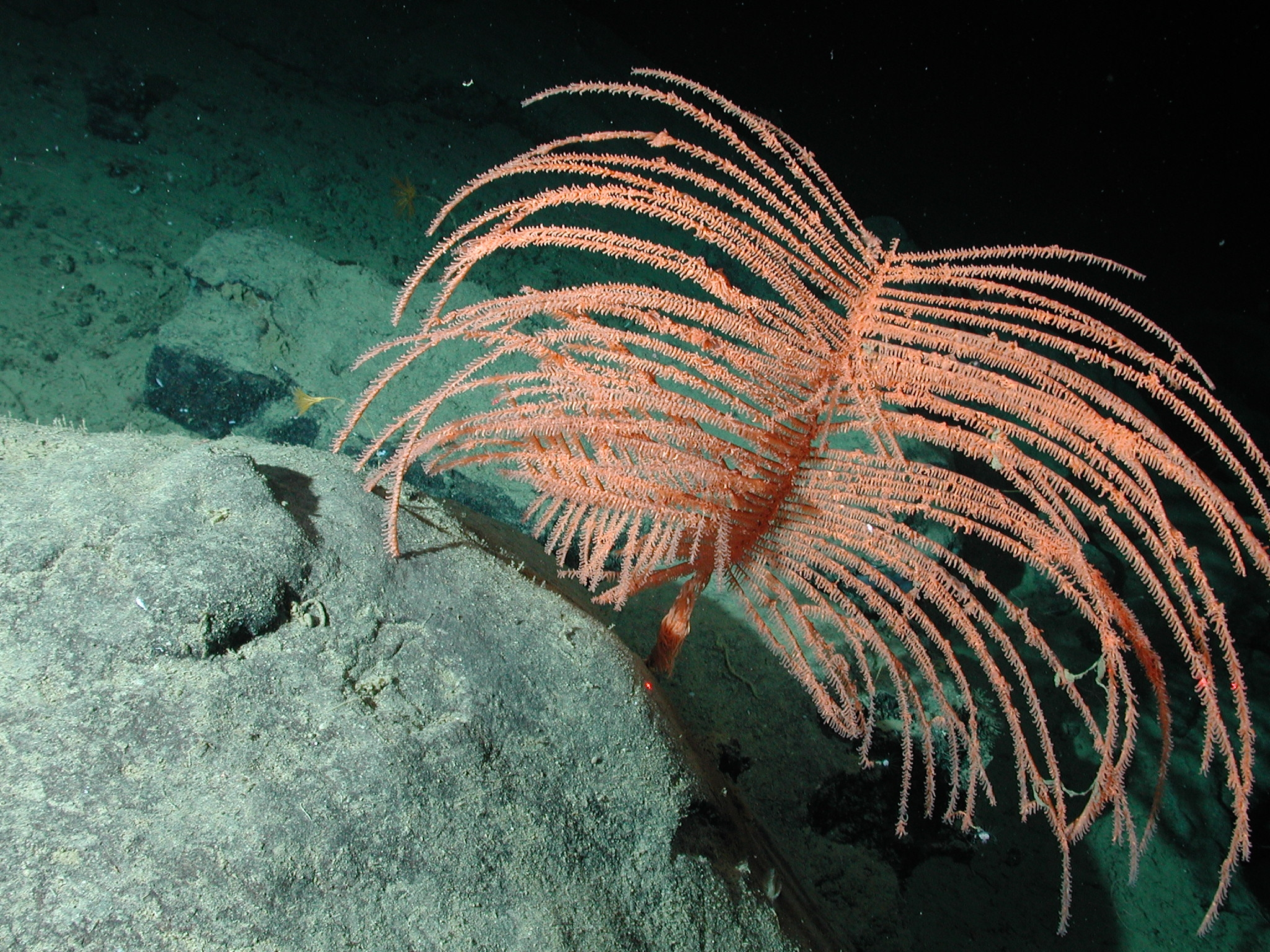
- Feather pen-like coral (Bathypathes sp.) at 2467 meters water depth. California, Davidson Seamount

Scientific classification
- Kingdom: Animalia
- Phylum: Cnidaria
- Subphylum: Anthozoa
- Class: Hexacorallia
- Order: Antipatharia
- Family: Schizopathidae
- Genus: Bathypathes; Brook, 1889

Species
- See text

Synonyms
- Bathypathes (Eubathypathes) van Pesch, 1914

= Bathypathes =

Genus of corals

Bathypathes is a genus of black coral in the family Schizopathidae.

== Species ==
Fourteen species are currently recognized in the genus.

- Bathypathes alaskensis Opresko & Molodtsova, 2021
- Bathypathes bayeri Opresko, 2001
- Bathypathes bifida Thompson, 1905
- Bathypathes conferta (Brook, 1889)
- Bathypathes erotema Schultze, 1903
- Bathypathes galatheae Pasternak, 1977
- Bathypathes patula Brook, 1889
- Bathypathes platycaulus Totton, 1923
- Bathypathes plenispina Brook, 1889
- Bathypathes ptiloides Opresko & Molodtsova, 2021
- Bathypathes robusta (Gravier, 1918)
- Bathypathes seculata Opresko, 2005
- Bathypathes thermophila Chimienti, 2022
- Bathypathes tiburonae Opresko & Molodtsova, 2022
- Bathypathes pseudoalternata Opresko & Molodtsova, 2021
