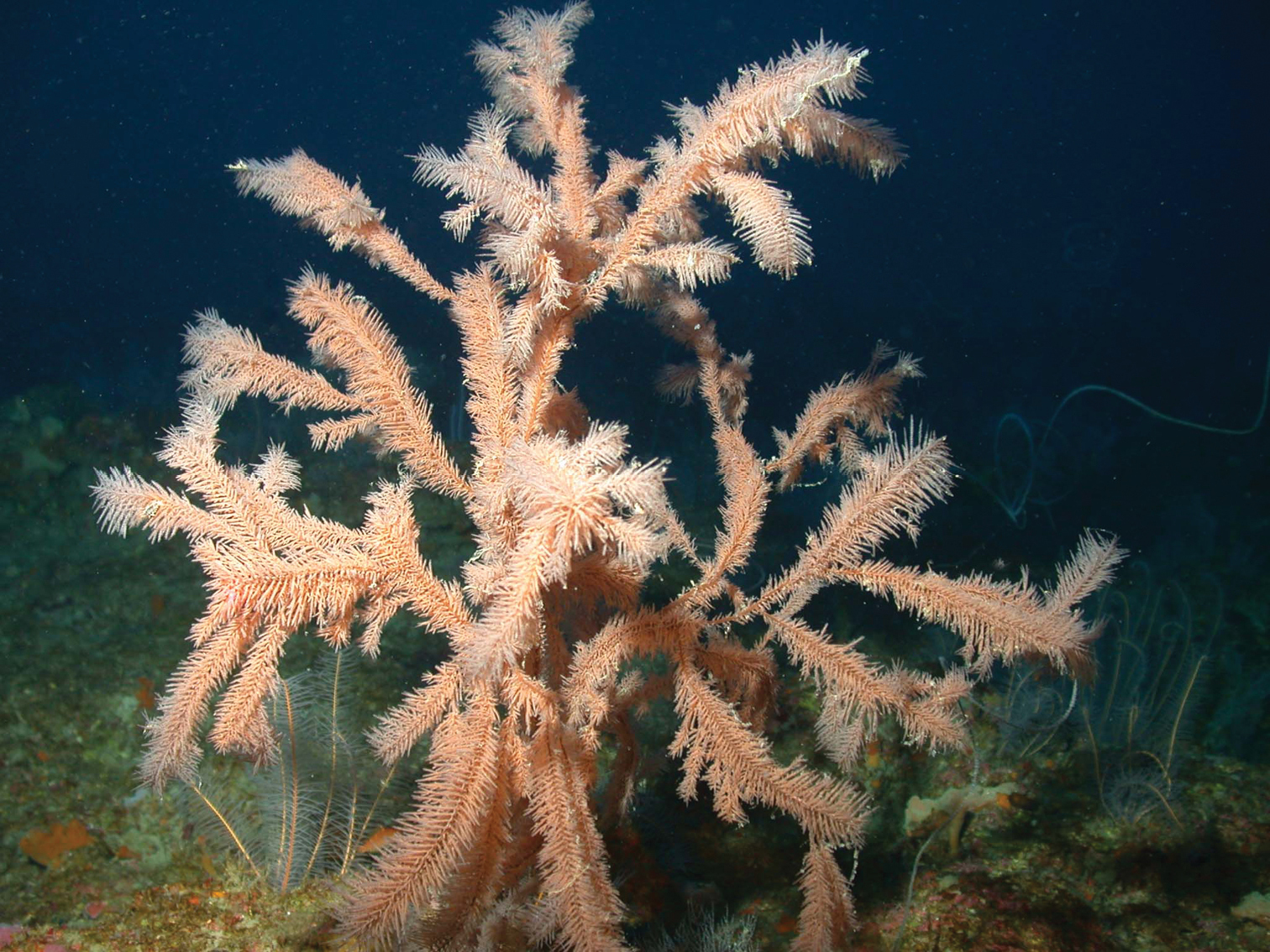

Scientific classification
- Domain: Eukaryota
- Kingdom: Animalia
- Phylum: Cnidaria
- Subphylum: Anthozoa
- Class: Hexacorallia
- Order: Antipatharia
- Family: Myriopathidae
- Genus: Tanacetipathes; Opresko, 2001

= Tanacetipathes =

Genus of corals

Tanacetipathes is a genus of corals belonging to the family Myriopathidae.

The species of this genus are found in Atlantic Ocean.

Species:

- Tanacetipathes barbadensis (Brook, 1889)
- Tanacetipathes cavernicola Opresko, 2001
- Tanacetipathes hirta (Gray, 1857)
- Tanacetipathes longipinnula Loiola & Castro, 2005
- Tanacetipathes spinescens (Gray, 1857)
- Tanacetipathes squamosa (Koch, 1886)
- Tanacetipathes tanacetum (Pourtalès, 1880)
- Tanacetipathes thalassoros Loiola & Castro, 2005
- Tanacetipathes thamnea (Warner, 1981)
- Tanacetipathes wirtzi Opresko, 2001
