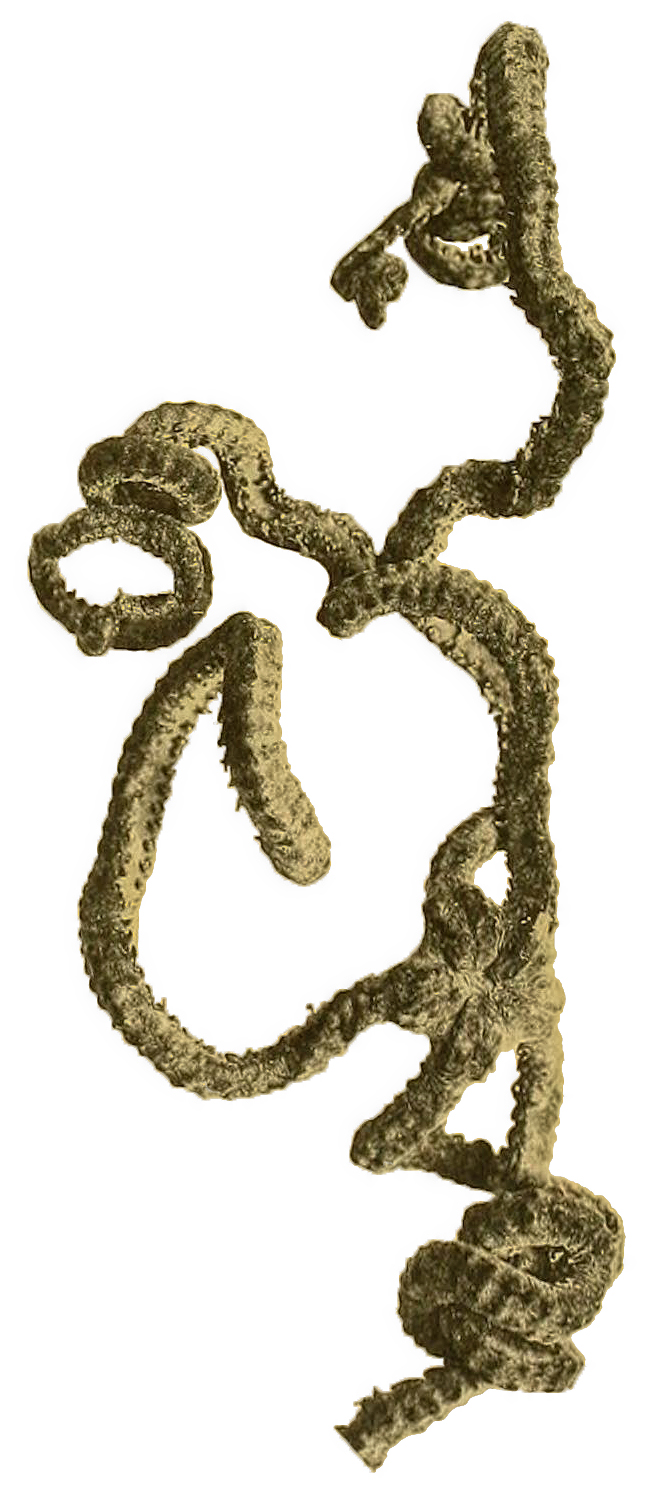

Scientific classification
- Kingdom: Animalia
- Phylum: Echinodermata
- Class: Ophiuroidea
- Order: Phrynophiurida
- Family: Euryalidae
- Genus: Astrobrachion
- Species: A. adhaerens

Binomial name
- Astrobrachion adhaerens (Studer, 1884)

Synonyms
- Asteronyx banzarei Madsen, 1967; Ophiocreas adhaerens Studer, 1884; Ophiocreas melambaphes H.L. Clark, 1914; Ophiocreas rhabdotum H.L. Clark, 1914

= Astrobrachion adhaerens =

Species of brittle star

Astrobrachion adhaerens is a basket star in the Euryalidae family. Along with A. constrictum, it is one of only two species in the genus Astrobrachion. Both species live in association with soft corals in moderately deep water. It is endemic to the west, north and east coasts of Australia, the Kermadec Islands and Lord Howe Island.

Euryalids are the least well known ophiuroids. There is even lesser knowledge about A. adhaerens available. However it is closely related to its only sister species, A. constrictum, and information about this species and the family as a whole can provide insight into the anatomy, morphology, reproduction, and suspension feeding habits of A. adhaerens.

== Taxonomy ==
The taxonomy and phylogeny of species in the order Euryalida and class Ophiuroidea has been ambiguous and continues to be investigated.

Euryalid fossils date back to strata as young as Cretaceous and Neogene. In the past, the ophiuroids were classified as either euryalids or non-euryalids due to stark morphological differences.

Increased study in the areas of ophiuroid and euryalid historical morphology have revealed that Euryalids diverged from Ophiurids during the Triassic period, explaining why its ancestors shared some of the morphologies of the class Ophiuroidea.

== Distribution and habitat ==
The genus Astrobrachion was first identified in New Zealand. Sister genera were identified in the Caribbean and Philippines.

Astrobrachion adhaerens is found in the tropical regions of Australia, ranging from Albany, Western Australia and the northern Australian coast to New South Wales, Lord Howe Island and the Kermadec Islands. The species is allopatric except at Lord Howe Island.

Basket stars are found to reside on soft, cold water-corals such as the Nephtheidae soft corals at depths ranging from 25m to 1317m, especially on the Labrador, Newfoundland and Baffin Bay shelves. However low relative co-occurrence ranges (4%-54%) suggest that soft corals are not a necessary basket star habitat.

== Anatomy and morphology ==
Basket stars have extensively branched arms made of a complex system of tissues and muscles. These arms are capable of regeneration, which is a characteristic that likely evolved as a response to frequent breaks of their long, thin, and fragile arms.

Genera in Euryalida typically have thick skin and possess lateral arm plates but rarely have ventral arm plates or dorsal arm plates. The genus Astrobrachion is set apart by having small ventral plates separated from the lateral arm by a supportive dermal tissue layer.

The length of arm spines on Astrobrachion is the same length as the corresponding arm segment, like its sister genus Squamophis. These two genera, therefore, have the shortest spines in the Asteroschematidae family.

Astrobrachion adhaerens has longitudinal stripes while its sister species A. constrictum has transverse color banding on the arms. Both species vary from red to yellowish-white in color.

Little is known of the reproductive system of A. adhaerens, but sexual characteristics are likely shared with closely related A. constrictum. A. constrictum are dioecious and exhibit no sexual dimorphism. They have a fused bursae and long, tubular gonads in the proximal half of their arms. Somewhat unique to reproduction within species of the Asteroschematidae family is the structure of the germinal epithelium: folding over the testes in the male and concentric tapering of the germinal epithelium in the ovaries in the female.

== Behaviour ==
Very little of A. adhaerens behavior has been observed as their hard substrate, nocturnal activities and deep water habitat hinder the observation and collection of specimens. A. adhaerens are suspension feeders that unfold their long, thin arms to feed at night.
