= Myriopathidae =

Scientific classification
- Kingdom: Animalia
- Phylum: Cnidaria
- Subphylum: Anthozoa
- Class: Hexacorallia
- Order: Antipatharia
- Family: Myriopathidae

Family of corals

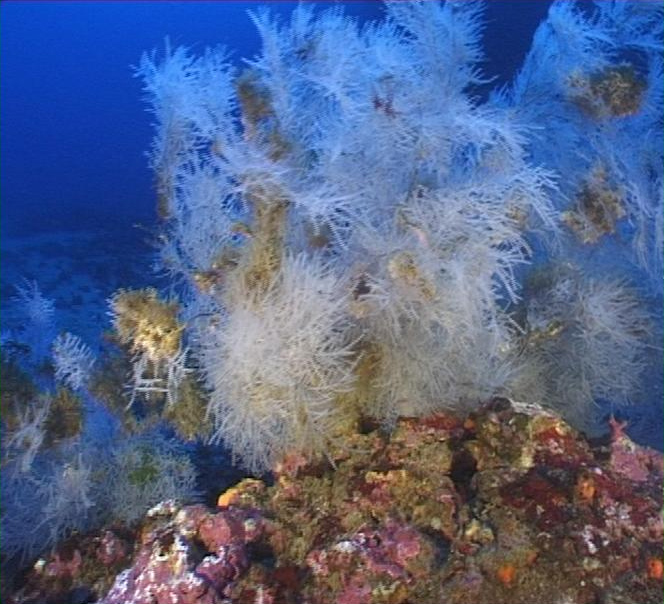
A colony of the black coral Antipathella subpinnata in the Strait of Messina

Myriopathidae is a family of cnidarians belonging to the order Antipatharia.

Genera:

- Antipathella Brook, 1889
- Cupressopathes Opresko, 2001
- Myriopathes Opresko, 2001
- Plumapathes Opresko, 2001
- Tanacetipathes Opresko, 2001
