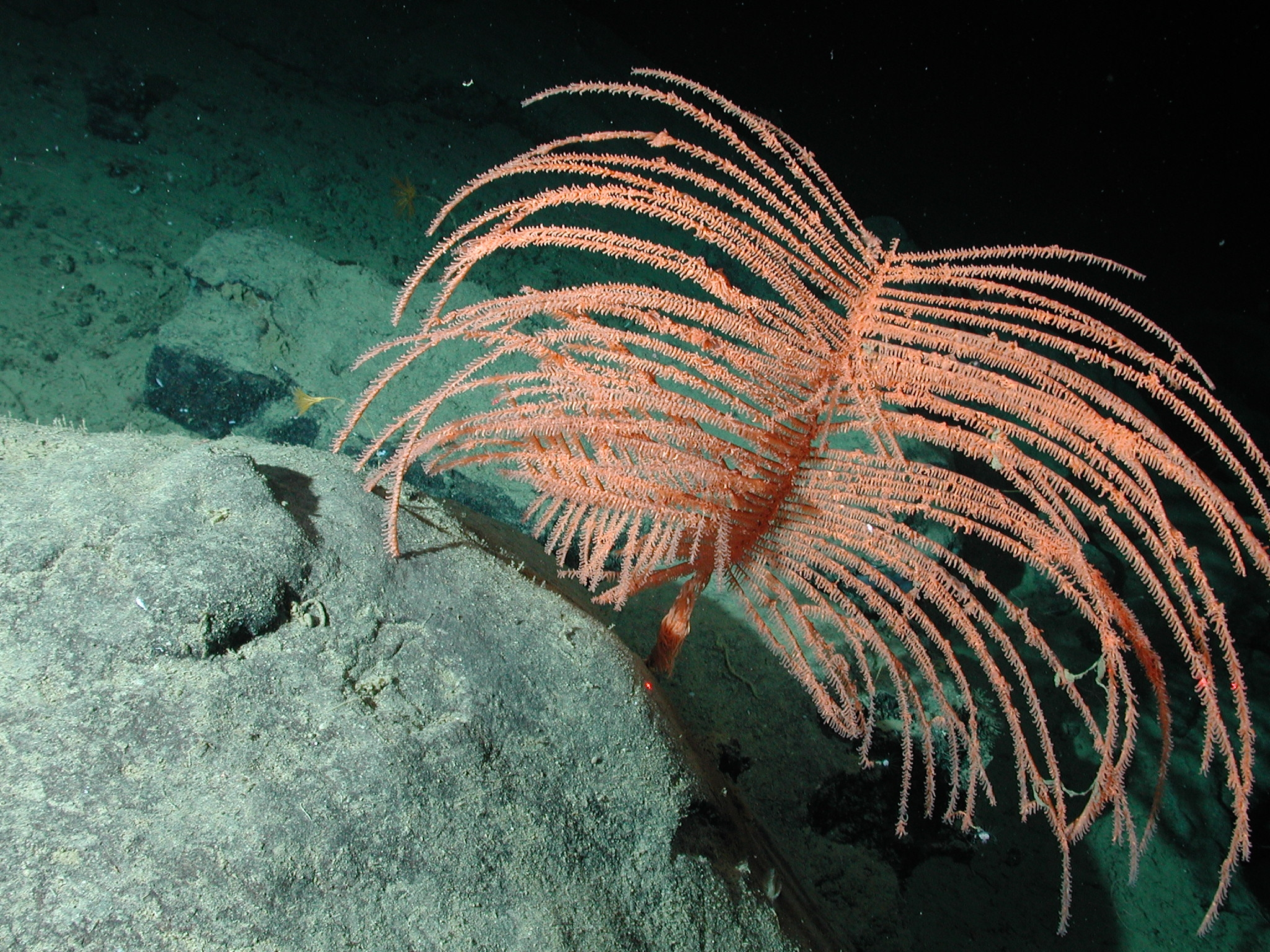

Scientific classification
- Kingdom: Animalia
- Phylum: Cnidaria
- Subphylum: Anthozoa
- Class: Hexacorallia
- Order: Antipatharia
- Family: Schizopathidae

= Schizopathidae =

Family of corals

Schizopathidae is a family of corals belonging to the order Antipatharia.

== Genera ==
Genera:

- Abyssopathes Opresko, 2002
- Alternatipathes Molodtsova & Opresko, 2017
- Bathypathes Brook, 1889
- Dendrobathypathes Opresko, 2002
- Dendropathes Opresko, 2005
- Diplopathes Opresko, Stewart, Voza, Tracey & Brugler, 2022
- Lillipathes Opresko, 2002
- Parantipathes Brook, 1889
- Saropathes Opresko, 2002
- Schizopathes Brook, 1889
- Stauropathes Opresko, 2002
- Taxipathes Brook, 1889
- Telopathes MacIsaac & Best, 2013
- Umbellapathes Opresko, 2005
