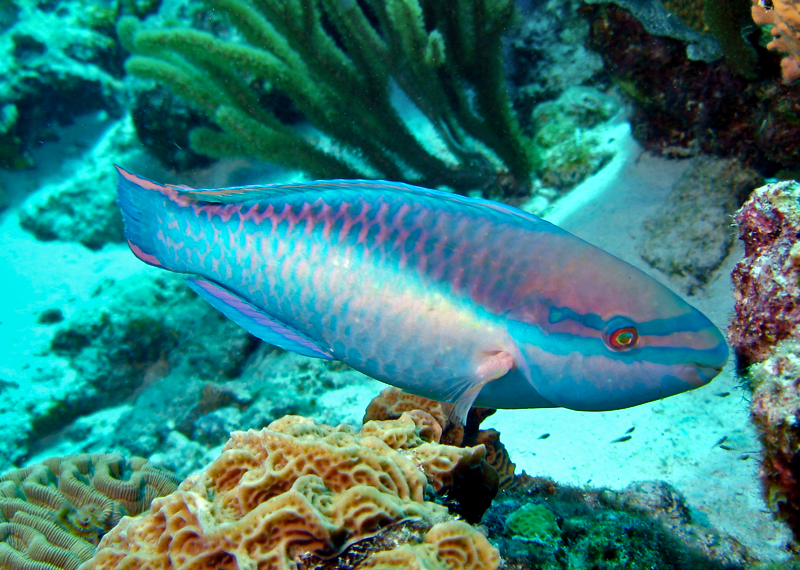

Conservation status
- Least Concern (IUCN 3.1)

Scientific classification
- Kingdom: Animalia
- Phylum: Chordata
- Class: Actinopterygii
- Order: Labriformes
- Family: Labridae
- Genus: Scarus
- Species: S. taeniopterus

Binomial name
- Scarus taeniopterus Lesson, 1829

= Princess parrotfish =

Species of fish

The princess parrotfish (Scarus taeniopterus) is a species of marine ray-finned fish, a parrotfish, in the family Scaridae. It is typically 20 to 25 centimetres (7.9 to 9.8 in) long, found in the Caribbean, South Florida, the Bahamas, and Bermuda. Its behavior, similar to other parrotfishes, is to swim about the reef and sandy patches during the day, at depths between 3 and 25 metres (9.8 and 82.0 ft), scraping algae on which it feeds.

== Characteristics ==
Parrotfishes are most known for their beak jaws that are fused together with their teeth. Their distinct teeth allow them to crush and grind food. The pharyngeal jaw is the second set of teeth located in the throat. The color of the princess parrotfish (Scarus taeniopterus) depends on their gender. Males have a blue body with yellow shading across whereas females are white with shades of orange and brown. Scarus taeniopterus have cycloid scales that are smooth edged.

== Distribution and roles in ecology ==
The family Scaridae are important in the ecosystem, supporting commercial fisheries and playing a significant role in the food chain of the coral reef. The fish scrape surfaces and excavate calcareous structures to acquire the nutrition they need. They are known for exerting top-down control on algae and when overfishing of parrotfish occurs in particular habitats, increases in the biomass of algae can be seen. When overfishing is not a concern, the parrotfish are able to graze and maintain coral reefs. Populations of the family Scaridae can be found along the Northern Great Barrier Reef, the Bahamas and the Caribbean. They prefer to graze shallow seas where coral grows under light. They prefer coral reefs but can also be found amongst seagrasses. The abundance of the species decreases with decreasing latitude. In regions where there are greater masses of predators, there is a positive correlation with the diversity of parrotfish. The increasing number of disturbances throughout the past years including coral bleaching events have influenced parrot fish assemblages. Recent research suggests that parrotfish abundance is enhanced by such disturbances because they create bare substratum where successional microbial communities can establish. It is therefore important to maintain monitoring of coral reef habitats.

== Diet ==
The diet of Scarus taeniopterus consists of algae, as well as coral polyps, and they are known primarily to be herbivores. By consuming epilithic algae, the fish are able to open space for young coral settlement and growth. They play a significant role in bringing coral reefs to recovery from major disturbances. Their distinct teeth which are fused together with their beak jaws allow them to crush and grind food. Climate change has increasingly started to alter the availability of food for adult populations of Scaridae, primarily in the Caribbean region. Climate change alters ocean currents which can potentially result in the reduction of food.

== Reproduction & life cycle ==
Scarus taeniopterus spawn year-round, under low sunlight. Peak spawning tends to be during the summer season. Evidence of parental behavior does not exist. Parrotfish eggs are dispersed by tidal currents and tend to hatch a day after being fertilized. They develop quickly and can reach maturity in a few years. The maximum lifespan of parrotfish is 20 years. However, most live 5 years or less. The family Scaridae are known for their complex reproductive systems. Males can be either born male or can be females that have gone through sex change based on the reproductive circumstance they are facing and whether or not it is an advantage to be one sex or the other.

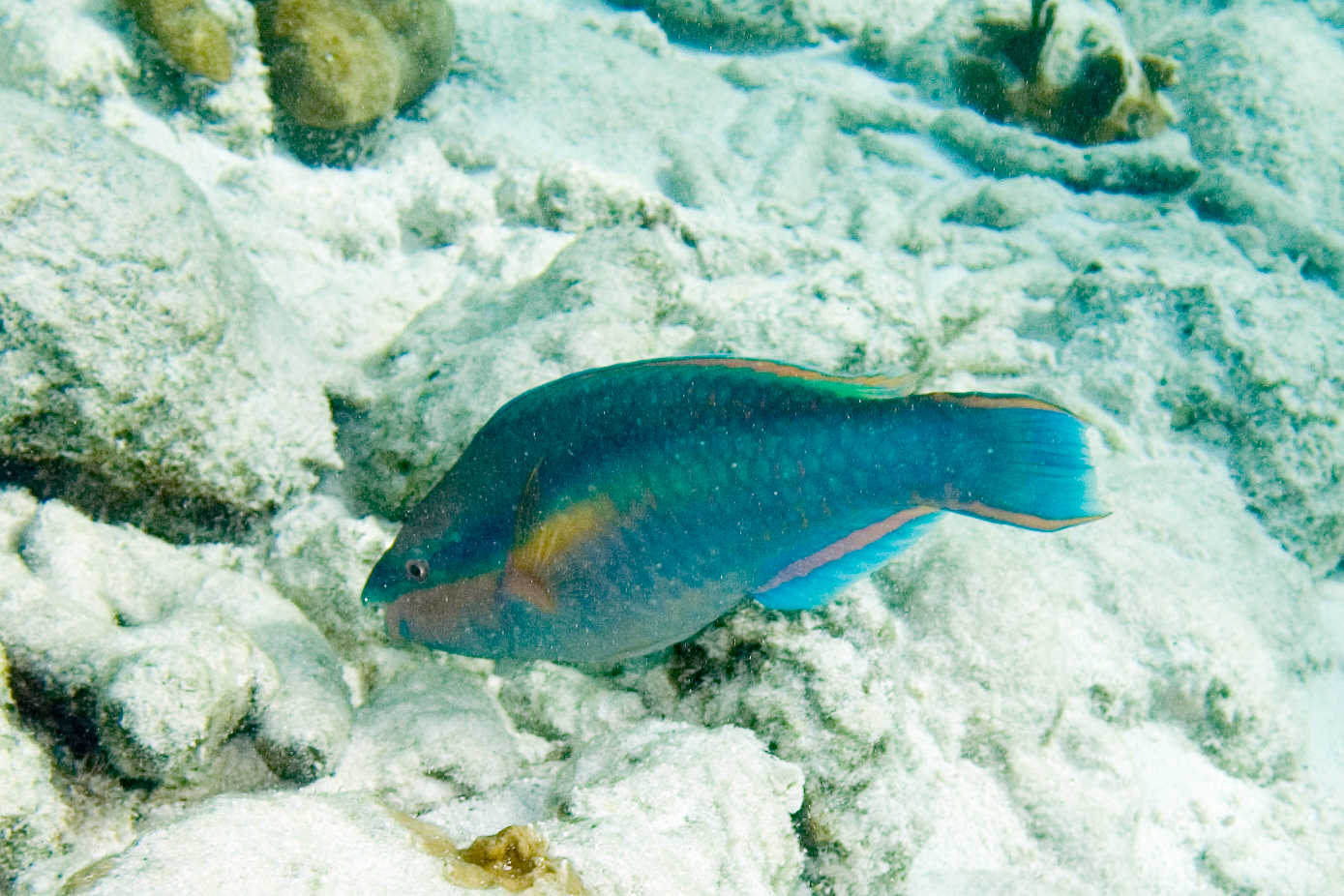
Male Scarus Taeniopterus

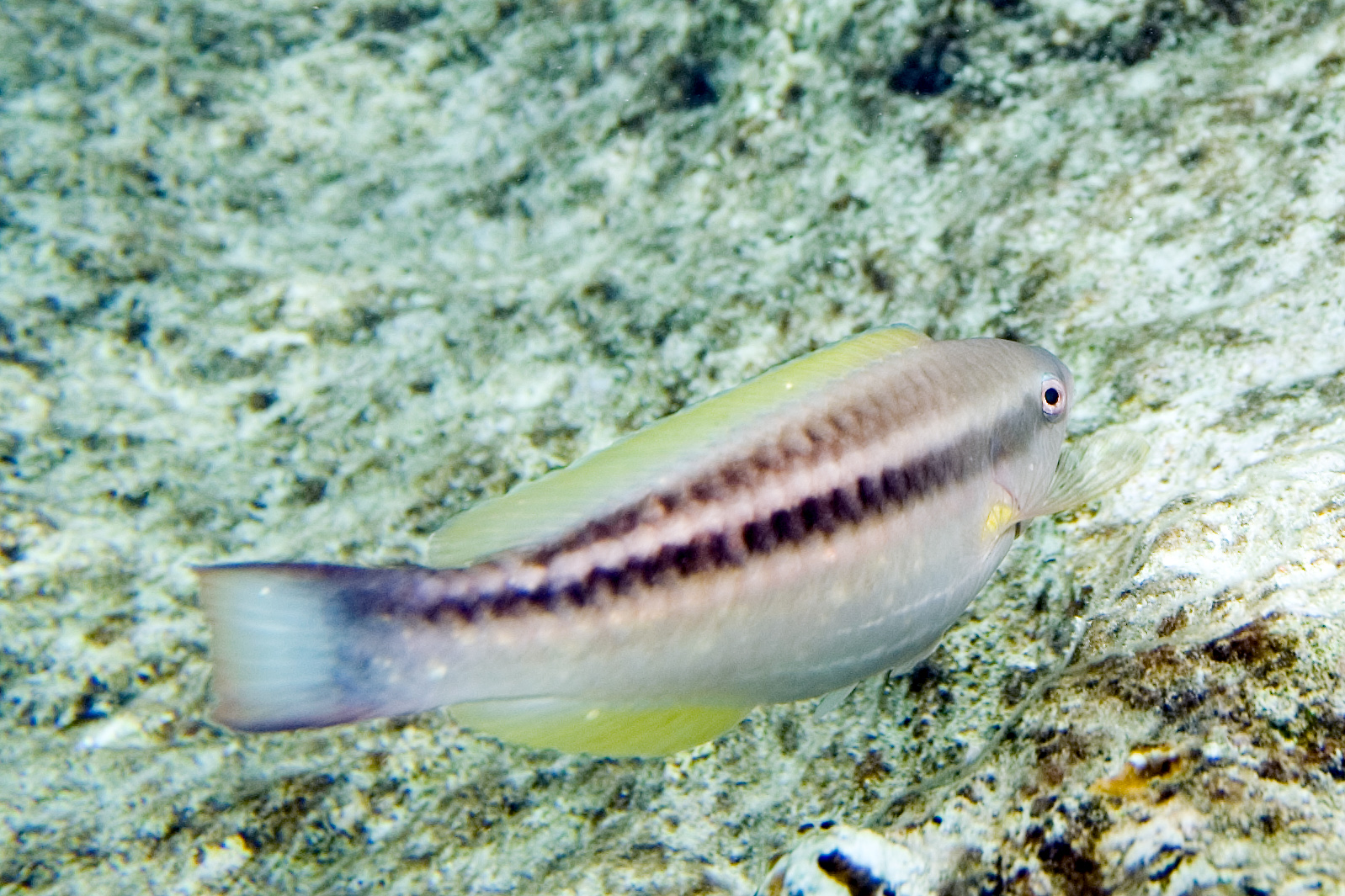
Female Scarus Taeniopterus

== Predators ==
The primary predators of the Scaridae family are humans (due to overfishing) and sharks. Parrotfish seek protection by hiding out in caves within the reef.
