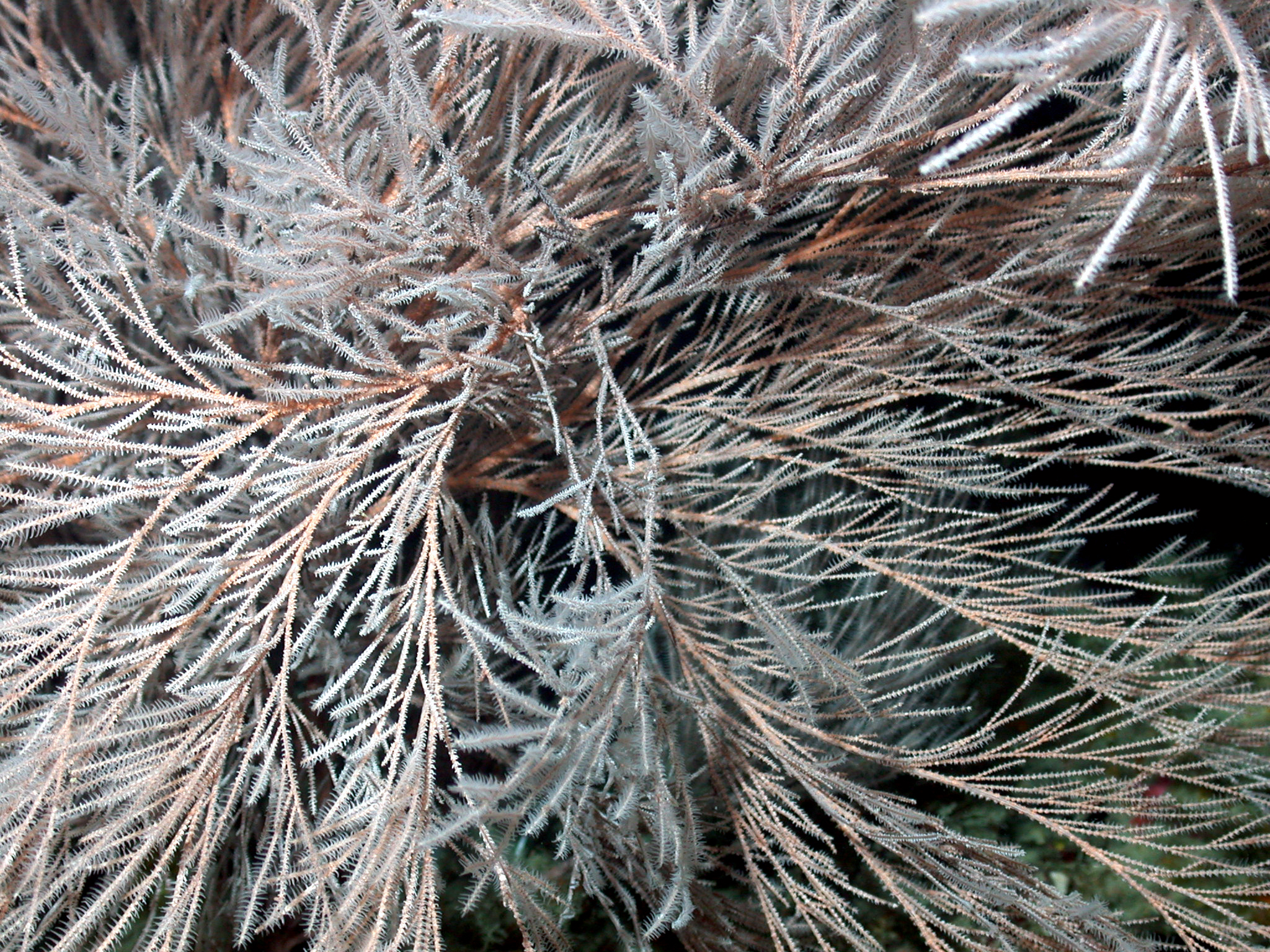

Scientific classification
- Domain: Eukaryota
- Kingdom: Animalia
- Phylum: Cnidaria
- Class: Hexacorallia
- Order: Antipatharia
- Family: Aphanipathidae
- Genus: Aphanipathes; Brook, 1889

Species
- Aphanipathes flailum; Aphanipathes pedata; Aphanipathes puertoricoensis; Aphanipathes salix; Aphanipathes sarothamnoides; Aphanipathes verticillata

= Aphanipathes =

Genus of corals

Aphanipathes is a diverse genus of black corals in the family Aphanipathidae, typified by large polypar spines. However, there are some disagreement in the correct taxonomic classification of this genus. The Global Biodiversity Information Facility (GBIF) classifies Aphanipathes as being a genus of the family Aphanipathidae while the Integrated Taxonomic Information System (ITIS) classifies it as a genus of the family Antipathidae.

Most commonly found in subtropic and tropic regions, this genus of coral lives in colonies on the continental slope of the ocean floor or on coral reefs. The colonies exhibit different physical appearances; they can be bushy, fan-shaped or branched like feathers. Most of the Aphanipathes species are found in tropical regions where they thrive and live successfully. They are never found in Arctic or Antarctic regions and are very scarce in temperate areas.

== Appearance and morphology ==
Species can be subdivided into three groups: species with nearly uniform polypar spines, species with slightly irregular polypar spines and normal hypostomal spines and species with slightly irregular polypar spines and reduced hypostomal spines. Comparing four members of the genus, as described by Opresko, Aphanipathes sarothamnoides, Aphanipathes salix, Aphanipathes verticillata, and Aphanipathes pedata all exhibit bushy, irregular branching corallum with mostly straight, elongated, upward branches.

Members of this genus tend to have uniserially arranged branches and branchlets, except for A. salix. A. columbiana colonies take a fan-shape that exhibits 9th order and greater branching with colonies growing in height usually less than 12 cm, but as high as 25 cm. Branchlets are ≤0.15mm in diameter, have smooth, needle-like spines usually 25mm tall or shorter and spaced 0.18-0.31 mm apart; polyps are spaced 0.27-0.36mm apart and are 0.55-0.65mm in transverse diameter. Polyps living on branchlets grow on one side, in rows of 9-10 per cm. A. columbiana colonies resemble those of Antipathes expansa, but expansa has spines which are more uniform in size. Compared to two common fan-shaped coral species also in the western Atlantic: Antipathes atlantica and Antipathes gracilis, Aphanipathes colombiana has long, smooth spines, not small (0.1mm) triangular ones.

Aphanipathes thyoides, a Caribbean species has similar spines and a similar branching shape, but unlike A. columbiana, its hypostomal spines are smaller or not present. Aphanipathes verticillata is a morphologically plastic species with large colonies branched to the 12th or greater order, with compressed conical spines covered in small conical tubercles, longitudinally arranged in rows. Polypar spines can be as long as 0.3 mm, and abpolypar spines 0.09-0.15 mm. Spines in rows are spaced 0.28-0.36 mm apart usually, but not more than 0.5mm. A. verticillata polyps are typically 1.2-1.5 mm in transverse diameter and are spaced 0.3-0.4 mm apart in single rows on branchlets. Colonies collected in Hawaii range in height from 0.25-1.5m tall. Aphanipathes sarothamnoides has 5-10 cm long branchlets, spaced 1.5-2.5cm apart with 0.2mm long spines, with tubercles covering the top third or half of spines at an average density of 2.3/1000μm^{2}. A. verticillata mauiensis and A. verticillata verticillata (found in Japan) are different only in tubercle density. The Hawaiian subspecies exhibits tubercle density of 2.4/1000μm^{2} and the Okinawa subspecies exhibits tubercle density of 2.9/1000μm^{2}. Aphanipathes salix has 2-3 cm long branchlets, spaced 0.3-2 cm apart, with 0.22 mm tall polypar and 0.13 mm abpolypar spines. A. salix has few spine tubercles, mostly near the apex with an average density of 2.2/1000μm^{2}.

== Distribution ==
A. columbiana has been found off the coast of Colombia, with colonies off Santa Marta and Isla del Tesoro in the rocky littoral zone and coral reefs in the western Atlantic. Aphanipathes can be found in the southwestern Atlantic, especially off the coast of Brazil (20°10’S). A. pedata and A. salix have been found in the West Indies, A. verticillata in the Indian Ocean and A. pedata off the Atlantic coast of Florida. A. sarothamnoides can be found in the south Pacific and off the coast of Palau in the northwest Pacific. A. verticillata is a species of Aphanipathes originally identified in the Ryukyu Islands and Okinawa Island, Japan, but a subspecies has also been identified in the Au’au Channel between Maui and Lanai, Hawaii.

== Relationship to genus Phanopathes ==
DNA sequencing on Aphanipathes pedata and Aphanipathes sarothamnoides show a close relationship Phanopathes rigida, which is in the same family Aphanipathidae.
