= Aphanipathidae =

Scientific classification
- Kingdom: Animalia
- Phylum: Cnidaria
- Subphylum: Anthozoa
- Class: Hexacorallia
- Order: Antipatharia
- Family: Aphanipathidae; Opresko, 2004

Genera
- Acanthopathes; Aphanipathes; Asteriopathes; Distichopathes; Elatopathes; Phanopathes; Pteridopathes; Rhipidipathes; Tetrapathes

Family of corals

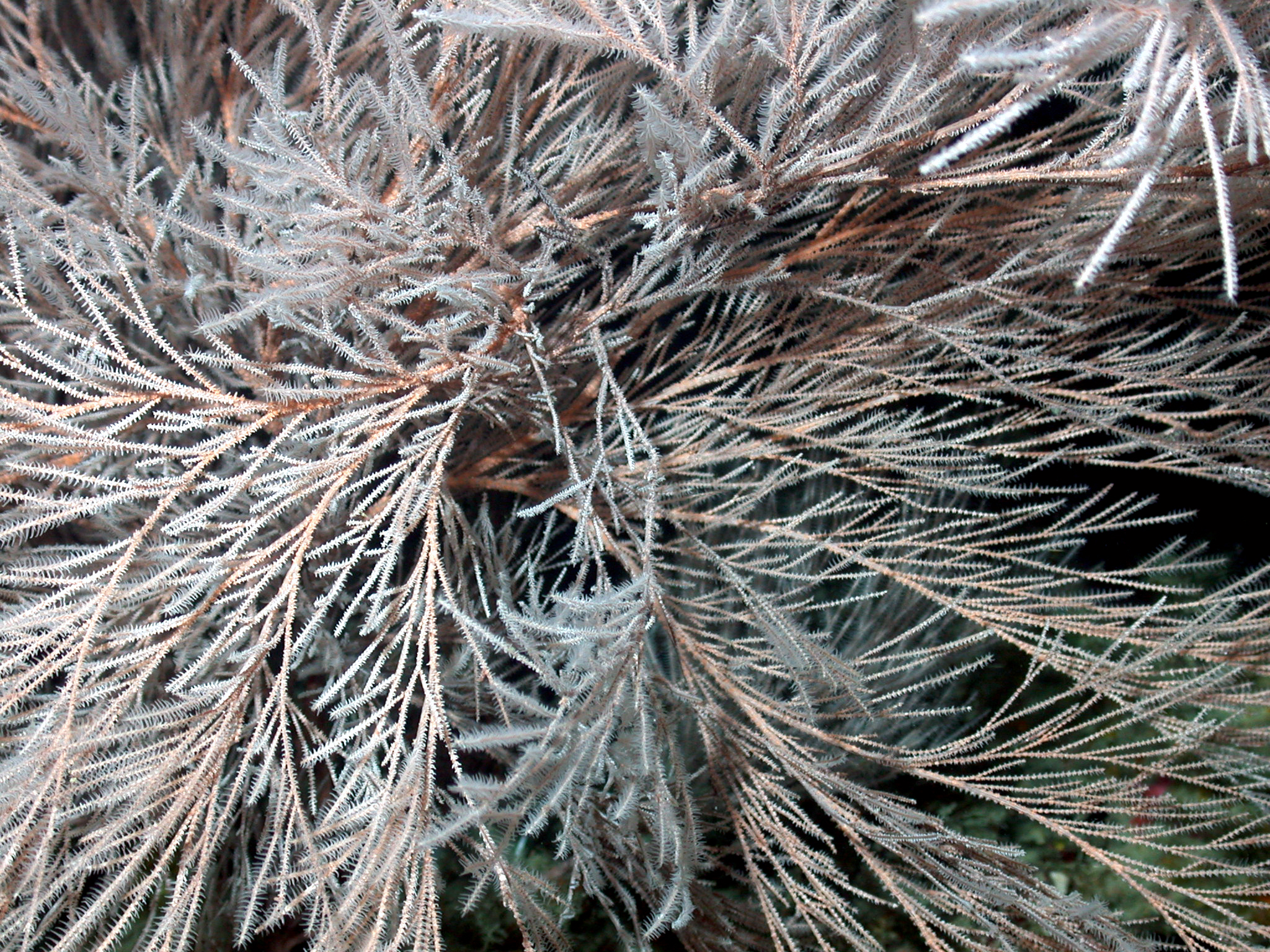
Aphanipathes

Aphanipathidae is a family of corals in the order Antipatharia. Species in this family have short, blunt polyp tentacles that tend to be uniform. Spines range from conical to cylindrical and usually have conical tubercles. Unlike Antipathidae, species in this family are not notched or branched at the end.
