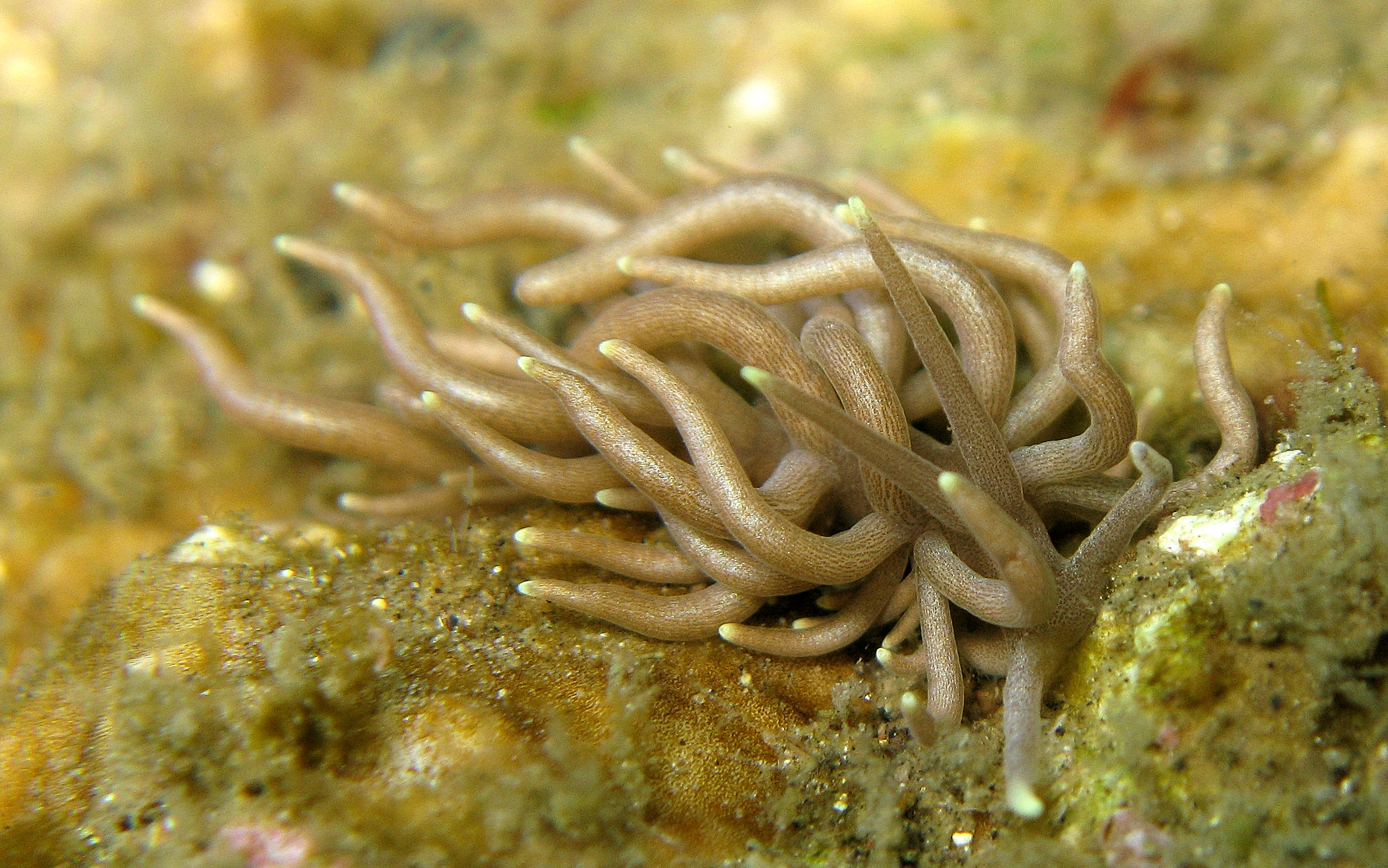
- Phyllodesmium briareum, head end towards the right
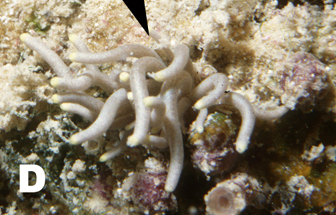

Scientific classification
- Kingdom: Animalia
- Phylum: Mollusca
- Class: Gastropoda
- Order: Nudibranchia
- Suborder: Aeolidacea
- Family: Myrrhinidae
- Genus: Phyllodesmium
- Species: P. briareum

Binomial name
- Phyllodesmium briareum (Bergh, 1896)

Synonyms
- Ennoia briareus Bergh, 1896

= Phyllodesmium briareum =

Species of gastropod

Phyllodesmium briareum is a species of sea slug, an aeolid nudibranch, a marine gastropod mollusc in the family Facelinidae.

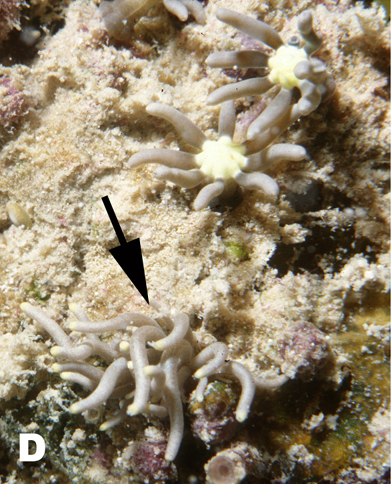
Phyllodesmium briareum (one specimen at the bottom of the image) looks very similar to the soft coral Briareum violaceum (at the top of the image).

== Distribution ==
The distribution of Phyllodesmium briareum includes Indo-Pacific and Australia.

== Description ==
Phyllodesmium briareum uses camouflage and looks like the soft coral Briareum violacea with which it is often found. It grows to 25 mm in length. This species contains zooxanthellae but has cerata of conventional aeolid shape.

== Ecology ==
Phyllodesmium briareum is reported to feed on a number of species of briareid soft coral including Solenopodium stelleri and Briareum stecheri (sensu MacFadyen, 1936). It is also reported from Pachyclavularia violacea.
