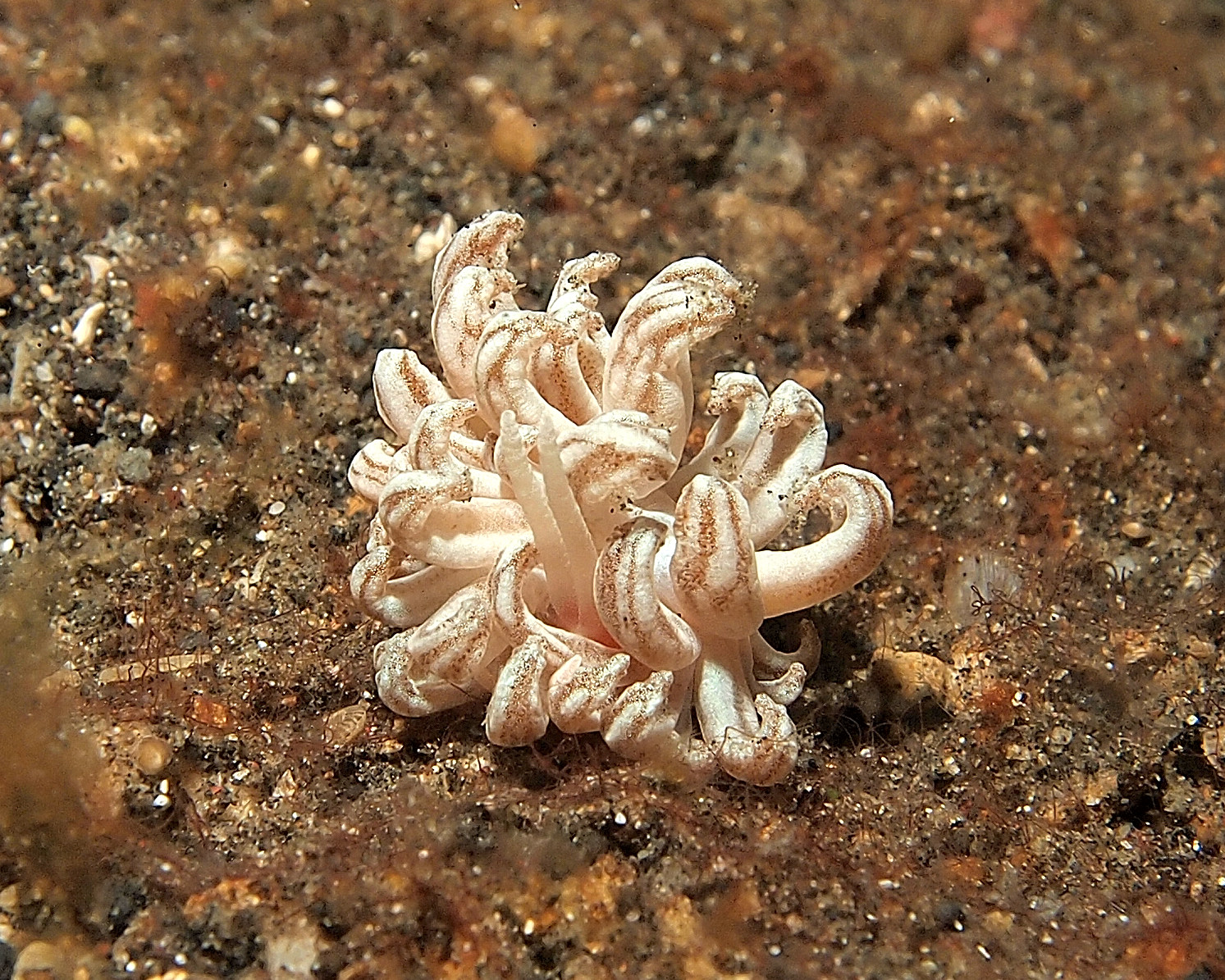

Scientific classification
- Kingdom: Animalia
- Phylum: Mollusca
- Class: Gastropoda
- Order: Nudibranchia
- Suborder: Aeolidacea
- Family: Myrrhinidae
- Genus: Phyllodesmium
- Species: P. jakobsenae

Binomial name
- Phyllodesmium jakobsenae Burghardt & Wägele, 2004

= Phyllodesmium jakobsenae =

Species of gastropod

Phyllodesmium jakobsenae is a species of sea slug, an aolid nudibranch, a marine gastropod mollusk in the family Facelinidae.

The specific name jakobsenae is in honor of diver and donor of marine slugs for research, Mrs. Wera Jakobsen.

== Distribution ==
The distribution of Phyllodesmium jakobsenae includes Bunaken Island, North Sulawesi, Indonesia and the Philippines.

== Description ==
This species contains zooxanthellae of the genus Symbiodinium in the digestive gland (hepatopancreas). It grows to 30 mm in length.

== Ecology ==
Phyllodesmium jakobsenae feeds on the soft coral Xenia.
