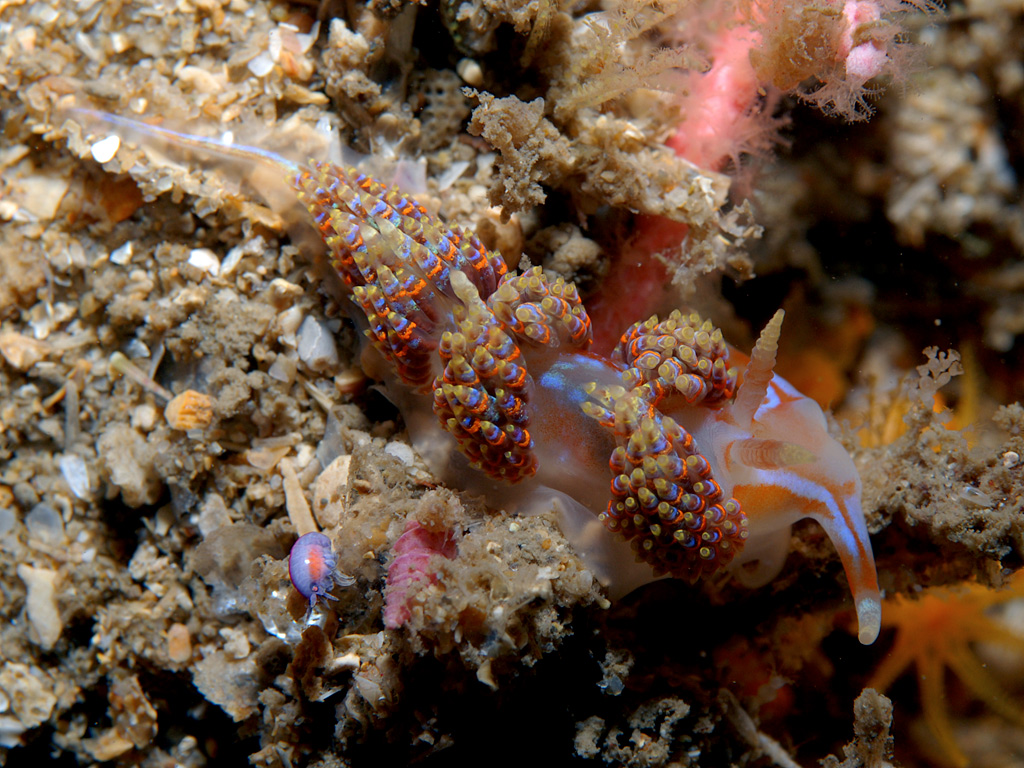
- The nudibranch Godiva quadricolor, 40 mm long, Algoa Bay, South Africa, 18-20 m.

Scientific classification
- Domain: Eukaryota
- Kingdom: Animalia
- Phylum: Mollusca
- Class: Gastropoda
- Order: Nudibranchia
- Suborder: Cladobranchia
- Family: Myrrhinidae
- Genus: Godiva
- Species: G. quadricolor

Binomial name
- Godiva quadricolor (Barnard, 1927)

Synonyms
- Hervia quadricolor Barnard, 1927 (original combination)

= Godiva quadricolor =

Species of gastropod

Godiva quadricolor is a species of sea slug, a nudibranch, a shell-less marine gastropod mollusc in the family Facelinidae.

== Distribution ==
This species was described from St. James, False Bay, South Africa. It occurs on the South African coast from the Cape Peninsula to East London, intertidally to 20 m. It has also been reported from the Mediterranean, off western Australia and West Africa.

== Description ==
Godiva quadricolor is a slender pale-bodied nudibranch with many cerata striped in bands of blue, yellow and orange. Its head is orange with rugose orange rhinophores and has a pair of orange oral tentacles with a white central stripe. Specimens from Western Australia differ significantly in colour and may represent another species.

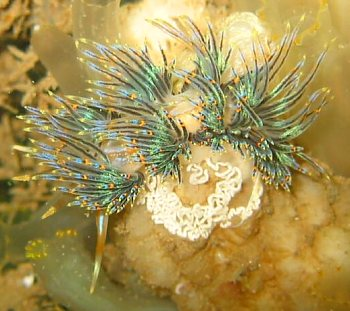
Godiva cf. quadricolor laying eggs, Swan River, Western Australia.

== Ecology ==
Godiva quadricolor preys on hydroids and on other nudibranchs. Its egg ribbon is a globular mass of white zigzags.
