= Phyllodesmium lembehense =

Scientific classification
- Kingdom: Animalia
- Phylum: Mollusca
- Class: Gastropoda
- Order: Nudibranchia
- Suborder: Aeolidacea
- Family: Myrrhinidae
- Genus: Phyllodesmium
- Species: P. lembehense

Binomial name
- Phyllodesmium lembehense Burghardt, Schrödl & Wägele, 2008

Species of gastropod

Phyllodesmium lembehense is a species of sea slug, an aeolid nudibranch, a marine gastropod mollusc in the family Facelinidae.

== Distribution ==
Known from the Lembeh strait, Sulawesi, Indonesia.
