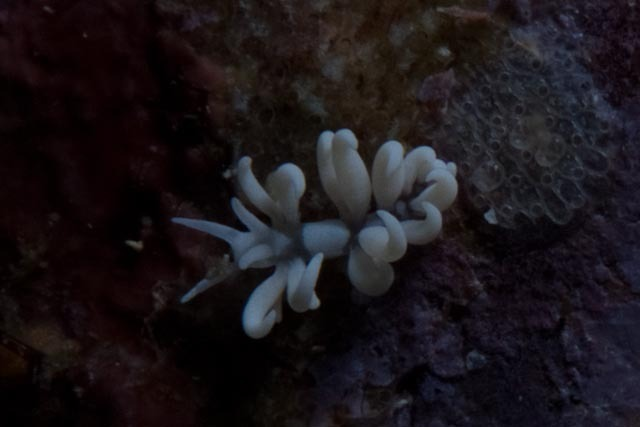

Scientific classification
- Kingdom: Animalia
- Phylum: Mollusca
- Class: Gastropoda
- Order: Nudibranchia
- Suborder: Aeolidacea
- Family: Myrrhinidae
- Genus: Phyllodesmium
- Species: P. pecten

Binomial name
- Phyllodesmium pecten Rudman, 1981

= Phyllodesmium pecten =

Species of gastropod

Phyllodesmium pecten is a species of sea slug, an aeolid nudibranch, a marine gastropod mollusc in the family Facelinidae.

== Distribution ==
The type locality for Phyllodesmium pecten is Fungu Yasin Reef, off Kunduchi Beach, Dar es Salaam, Tanzania.

== Description ==
The body is translucent or yellowish with a distinct pattern of opaque white pigment. On the head there is an inverted triangular white patch, the apex of the triangle joining a white band running across the head just in front of the rhinophores. Just behind the rhinophores is a triangular white patch and there is a diamond-shaped white patch along the centre line between each ceratal cluster. The upper halves of the oral tentacles and rhinophores are opaque white. The length of the slug is up to 22 mm.

== Ecology ==
Phyllodesmium pecten feeds on the soft coral Xenia sp.
