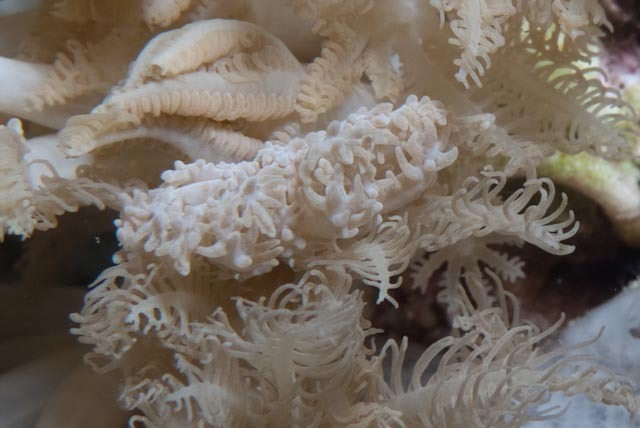

Scientific classification
- Kingdom: Animalia
- Phylum: Mollusca
- Class: Gastropoda
- Order: Nudibranchia
- Suborder: Aeolidacea
- Family: Myrrhinidae
- Genus: Phyllodesmium
- Species: P. pinnatum

Binomial name
- Phyllodesmium pinnatum Moore & Gosliner, 2009

= Phyllodesmium pinnatum =

Species of gastropod

Phyllodesmium pinnatum is a species of sea slug, an aeolid nudibranch, a marine gastropod mollusc in the family Facelinidae.

== Distribution ==
This species was described from Devil's Point, Maricaban Island, Batangas Province, Luzon Island, Philippines.
