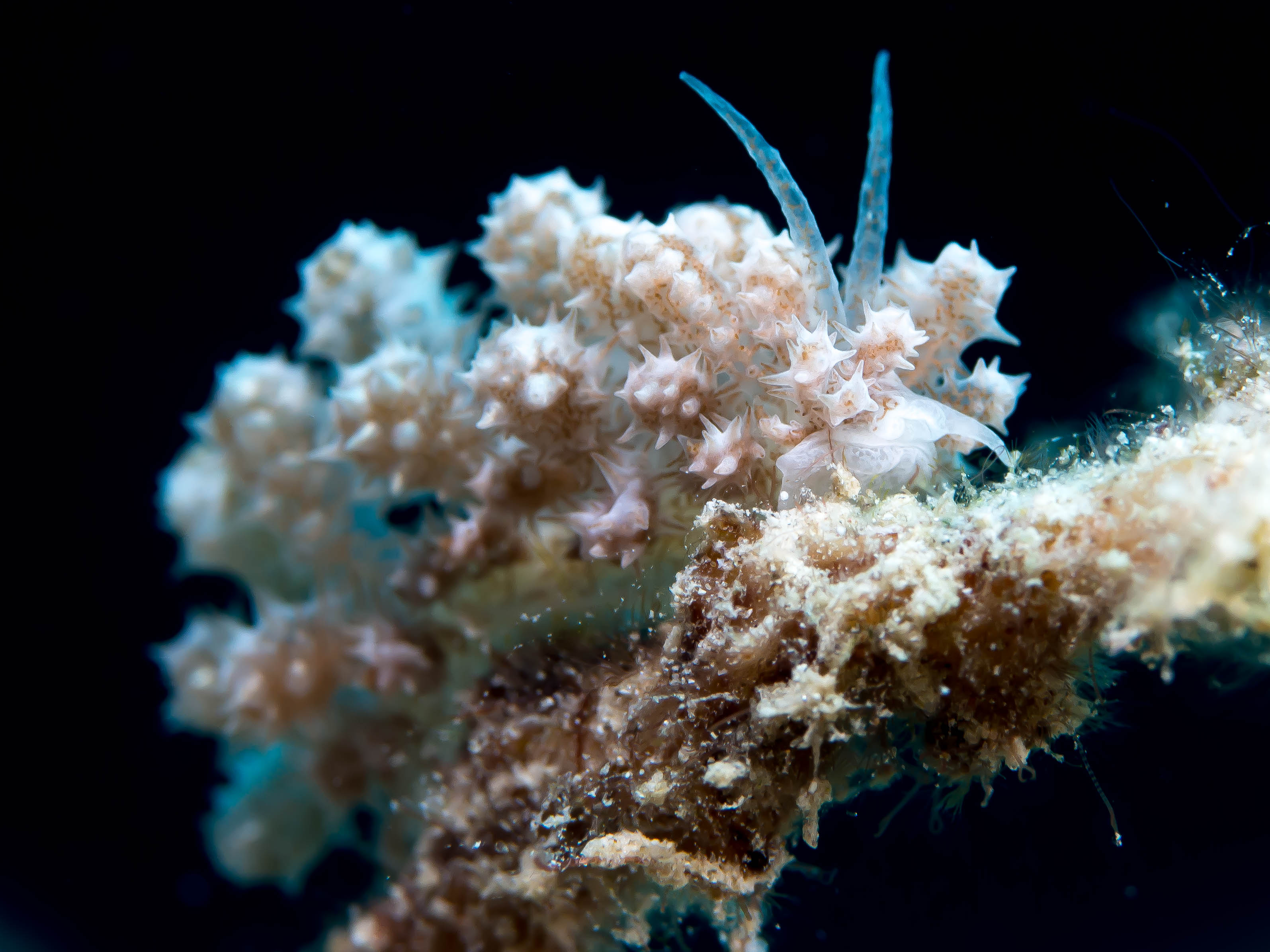

Scientific classification
- Kingdom: Animalia
- Phylum: Mollusca
- Class: Gastropoda
- Order: Nudibranchia
- Suborder: Aeolidacea
- Family: Myrrhinidae
- Genus: Phyllodesmium
- Species: P. koehleri

Binomial name
- Phyllodesmium koehleri Burghardt, Schrödl & Wägele, 2008

= Phyllodesmium koehleri =

Species of gastropod

Phyllodesmium koehleri is a species of sea slug, an aeolid nudibranch, a marine gastropod mollusc in the family Facelinidae.

== Distribution ==
Known from southern Queensland, Australia; Okinawa, Japan; Sulawesi, Indonesia, New Britain, Papua New Guinea and the Philippines.
