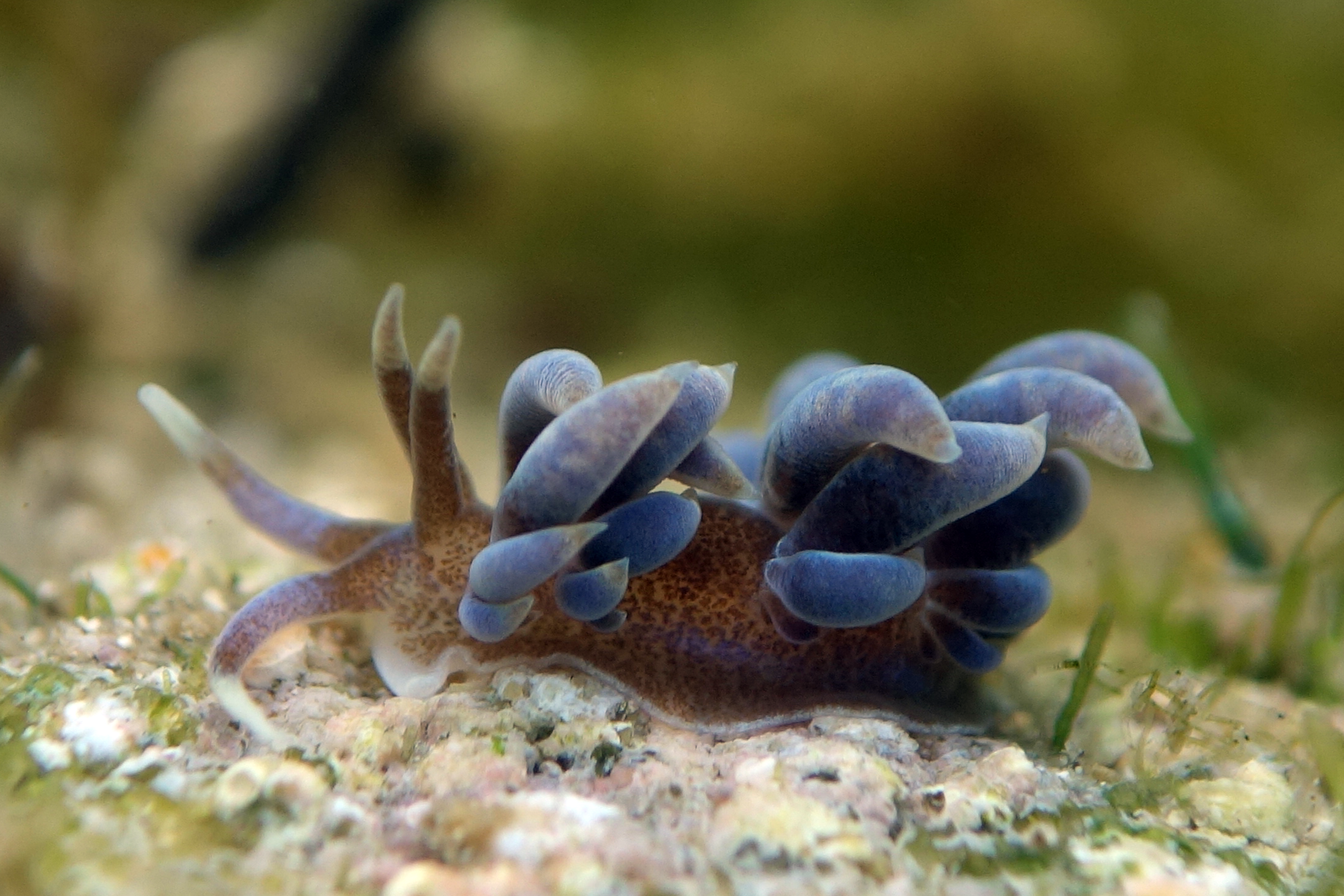

Scientific classification
- Kingdom: Animalia
- Phylum: Mollusca
- Class: Gastropoda
- Order: Nudibranchia
- Suborder: Aeolidacea
- Family: Myrrhinidae
- Genus: Phyllodesmium
- Species: P. macphersonae

Binomial name
- Phyllodesmium macphersonae (Burn, 1962)

Synonyms
- Cratena macphersonae Burn, 1962

= Phyllodesmium macphersonae =

Species of gastropod

Phyllodesmium macphersonae is a species of sea slug, an aeolid nudibranch, a marine gastropod mollusc in the family Facelinidae.

== Distribution ==
The distribution of Phyllodesmium macphersonae includes Australia, Tanzania and Japan.

== Description ==
The length of the slug is 4–35 mm. This species contains zooxanthellae.

== Ecology ==
Phyllodesmium macphersonae feeds on an octocoral.
