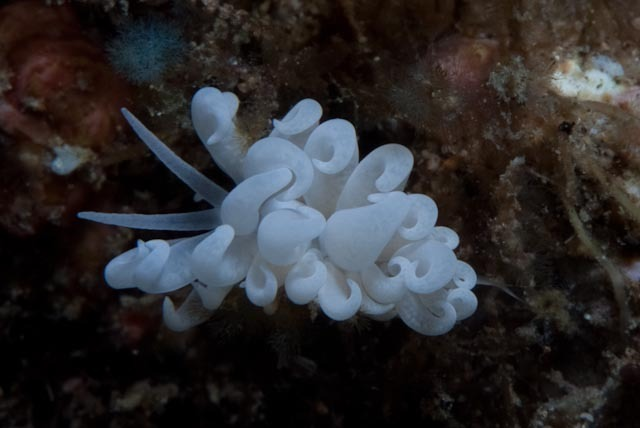

Scientific classification
- Kingdom: Animalia
- Phylum: Mollusca
- Class: Gastropoda
- Order: Nudibranchia
- Suborder: Aeolidacea
- Family: Myrrhinidae
- Genus: Phyllodesmium
- Species: P. parangatum

Binomial name
- Phyllodesmium parangatum Ortiz & Gosliner, 2003

= Phyllodesmium parangatum =

Species of gastropod

Phyllodesmium parangatum is a species of sea slug, an aeolid nudibranch, a marine gastropod mollusc in the family Facelinidae.

The specific name parangatum refers to words "parang gatas" from Filipino language, that points to its milky color. "Gatas" means "milk" in Filipino language.

== Distribution ==
The type locality of Phyllodesmium parangatum is Twin Rocks, Anilao, Batangas Province, southern Luzon Island, northern Philippines.

== Description ==
The length of the slug is up to 20 mm. The color varies from translucent white to milky yellow. This species contains zooxanthellae.

== Ecology ==
Phyllodesmium parangatum probably feeds on an octocoral but its food preferences are not known.
