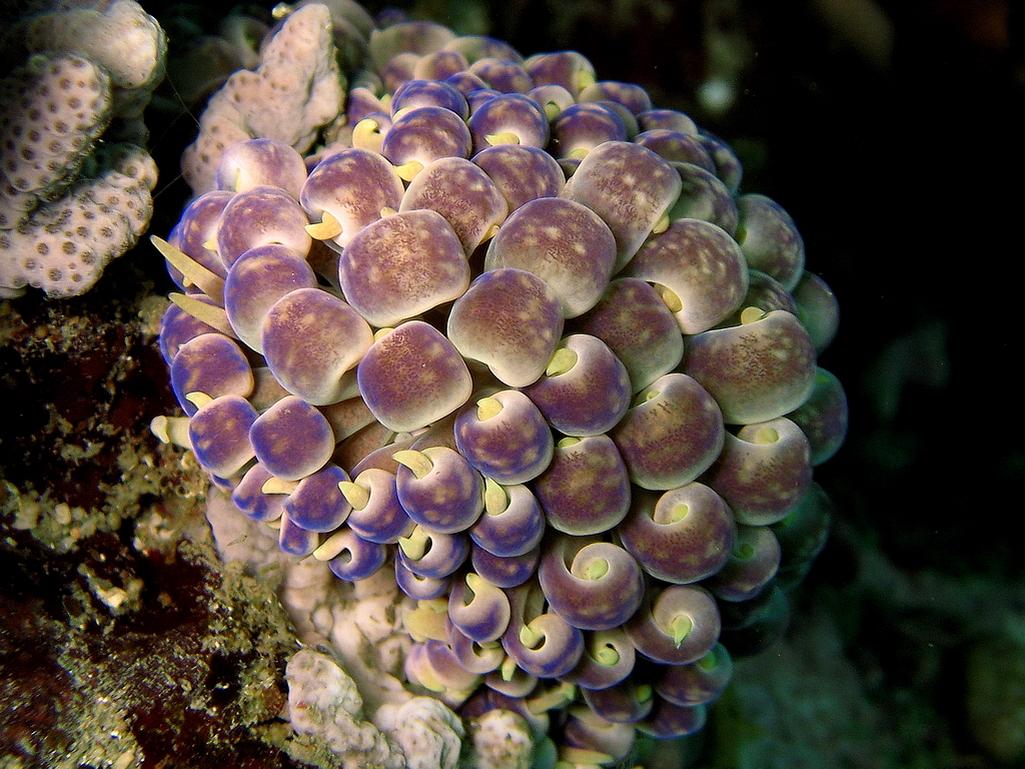
- Phyllodesmium magnum, a nudibranch which is rarely found by scuba divers. This one was observed in a diving site named Shi-Cheng, located in Northeast coast of Taiwan

Scientific classification
- Kingdom: Animalia
- Phylum: Mollusca
- Class: Gastropoda
- Order: Nudibranchia
- Suborder: Aeolidacea
- Family: Myrrhinidae
- Genus: Phyllodesmium
- Species: P. magnum

Binomial name
- Phyllodesmium magnum Rudman, 1991

= Phyllodesmium magnum =

Species of gastropod

Phyllodesmium magnum is a species of sea slug, an aeolid nudibranch, a marine gastropod mollusc in the family Facelinidae.

== Distribution ==
This species was described from New Caledonia with additional material from NW Australia, the Marshall Islands and Hong Kong. The distribution of Phyllodesmium magnum includes North Kermadec and Guam.

== Description ==
This species grows to 130 mm in length. It is one of the Phyllodesmium species which contain zooxanthellae.

== Ecology ==
Phyllodesmium magnum feeds on a soft coral Sinularia sp.
