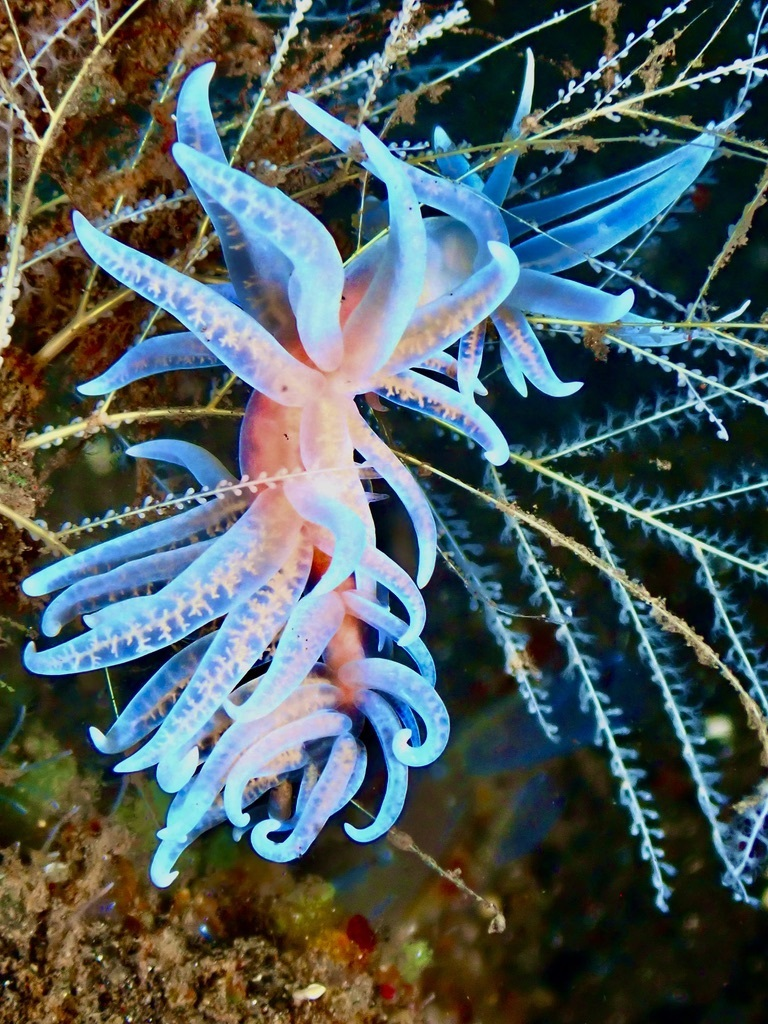

Scientific classification
- Kingdom: Animalia
- Phylum: Mollusca
- Class: Gastropoda
- Order: Nudibranchia
- Suborder: Aeolidacea
- Family: Myrrhinidae
- Genus: Phyllodesmium
- Species: P. iriomotense

Binomial name
- Phyllodesmium iriomotense Baba, 1991

= Phyllodesmium iriomotense =

Species of gastropod

Phyllodesmium iriomotense is a species of sea slug, an aeolid nudibranch, a marine gastropod mollusc in the family Facelinidae.

The specific name iriomotense refers to its type locality, the island Iriomote.

== Distribution ==
The type locality of this species is Iriomote, Ryukyu Islands, Japan. It has also been reported from Okinawa and Sulawesi, Indonesia.

== Description ==
The length of the slug is 20 mm. This species does not contain zooxanthellae.

== Ecology ==
Phyllodesmium iriomotense was found on a thread like alcyonarian which is probably its food.
