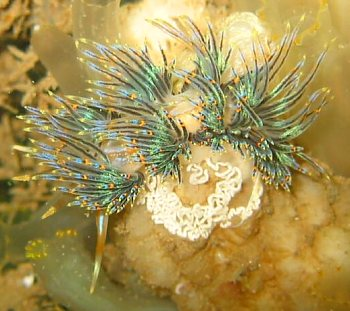
- Godiva cf. quadricolor laying eggs

Scientific classification
- Kingdom: Animalia
- Phylum: Mollusca
- Class: Gastropoda
- Order: Nudibranchia
- Suborder: Aeolidacea
- Family: Myrrhinidae
- Genus: Godiva; Macnae, 1954

Type species
- Godiva quadricolor (Barnard, 1927)

= Godiva (gastropod) =

Genus of gastropods

Godiva is a genus of sea slugs, a nudibranch, a shell-less marine gastropod mollusks in the family Myrrhinidae.

== Species ==
Species within the genus include:

- Godiva brunnea Edmunds, 2015
- Godiva quadricolor (Barnard, 1927) - type species
- Godiva rachelae Rudman, 1980
- Godiva rubrolineata Edmunds, 1964

Species brought into synonymy

- Godiva banyulensis (Portmann & Sandmeier, 1960): synonym of Nemesignis banyulensis (Portmann & Sandmeier, 1960)
- Godiva japonica (Baba, 1937): synonym of Sakuraeolis japonica (Baba, 1937)
- Godiva modesta (Bergh, 1880): synonym of Sakuraeolis japonica (Baba, 1937)
