= Nanuca perolata =

Scientific classification
- Kingdom: Animalia
- Phylum: Mollusca
- Class: Gastropoda
- Order: Nudibranchia
- Suborder: Aeolidacea
- Family: Myrrhinidae
- Genus: Nanuca
- Species: N. perolata

Binomial name
- Nanuca perolata Henryco, Meirelles, García-Méndez, Camacho-García, Valdés, Schrödl & Padula, 2025

Species of gastropod

Nanuca perolata is a species of sea slug, specifically an aeolid nudibranch. It is a marine gastropod mollusc in the family Myrrhinidae, and is endemic to Brazil.

== Etymology ==
The specific name perolata comes from the Portuguese word pérola (from Latin perula, meaning "pearl"), in reference to both the pearly coloration of the body and the shape of the egg masses, which resemble a string of pearls.

== Distribution ==
This species is only known to occur at the Rocas Atoll, off northeastern Brazil.
