= Nanuca smaugi =

Scientific classification
- Kingdom: Animalia
- Phylum: Mollusca
- Class: Gastropoda
- Order: Nudibranchia
- Suborder: Aeolidacea
- Family: Myrrhinidae
- Genus: Nanuca
- Species: N. smaugi

Binomial name
- Nanuca smaugi Henryco, Meirelles, García-Méndez, Camacho-García, Valdés, Schrödl & Padula, 2025

Species of gastropod

Nanuca smaugi is a species of sea slug, specifically an aeolid nudibranch. It is a marine gastropod mollusc in the family Myrrhinidae, and is endemic to Brazil.

== Etymology ==
Nanuca smaugi was named after Smaug, the dragon from The Hobbit. The name alludes to the dragon's red and gold wings, which are reminiscent of the species' dragon-like body shape and its vivid orange coloration.

== Distribution ==
This species is known from the Cabo Frio region in southeastern Brazil, at 3–15 m depths.
