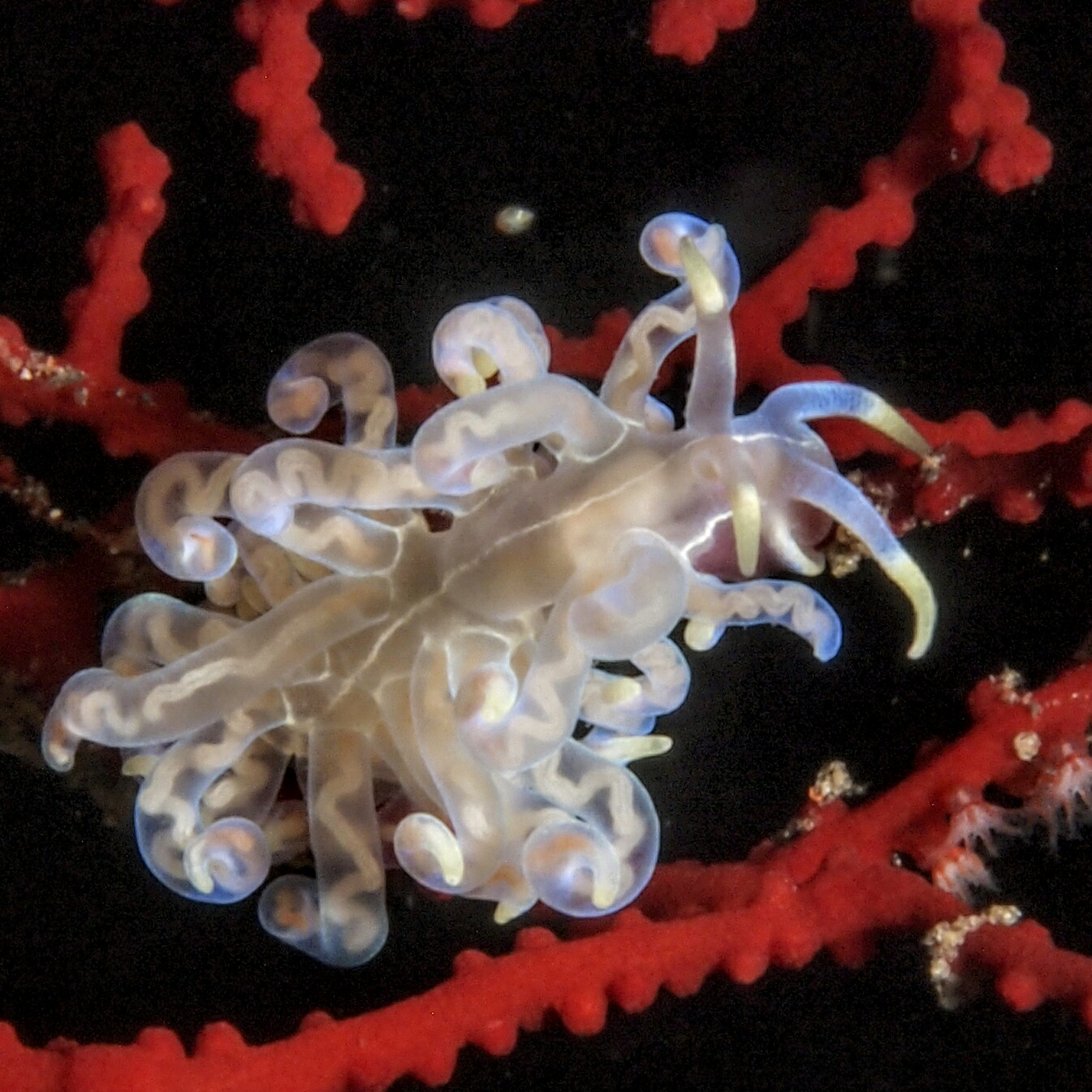
- Phyllodesmium undulatum.

Scientific classification
- Kingdom: Animalia
- Phylum: Mollusca
- Class: Gastropoda
- Order: Nudibranchia
- Suborder: Aeolidacea
- Family: Myrrhinidae
- Genus: Phyllodesmium
- Species: P. undulatum

Binomial name
- Phyllodesmium undulatum Moore & Gosliner, 2014

= Phyllodesmium undulatum =

Species of gastropod

Phyllodesmium undulatum is a species of sea slugs, an aeolid nudibranch, a marine gastropod mollusc in the family Facelinidae.

== Distribution ==
This species was described from Waterfall Bay, Pulau Tioman, Malaysia. Also known from Sepok, on Maricaban Island off southern Luzon, Philippines and near Ikei-shima in the Ryukyu Islands, Japan. There is one photograph of this species from Manado, Indonesia, taken by Pauline Fiene in 1991, but there are no specimens available from this region.
