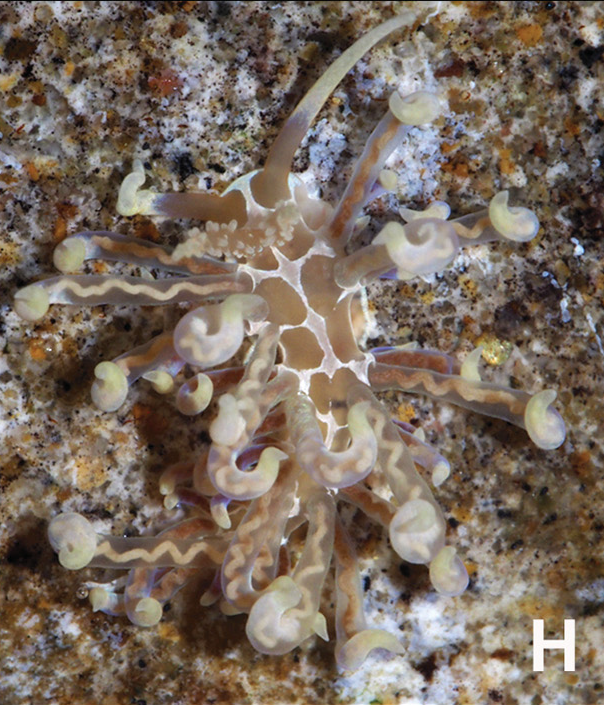

Scientific classification
- Kingdom: Animalia
- Phylum: Mollusca
- Class: Gastropoda
- Order: Nudibranchia
- Suborder: Aeolidacea
- Family: Myrrhinidae
- Genus: Phyllodesmium
- Species: P. acanthorhinum

Binomial name
- Phyllodesmium acanthorhinum Moore & Gosliner, 2014

= Phyllodesmium acanthorhinum =

Species of gastropod

Phyllodesmium acanthorhinum is a species of sea slugs, an aeolid nudibranch, a marine gastropod mollusc in the family Facelinidae.

In 2015, the International Institute for Species Exploration names it as one of the "Top 10 New Species" for new species discovered in 2015.

== Distribution ==
This species was described from 3–4 m depth, near Onna Village, Horseshoe Cliffs, Okinawa, Ryukyu Islands, Japan. It has also been reported from Lizard Island, Great Barrier Reef, Australia.
