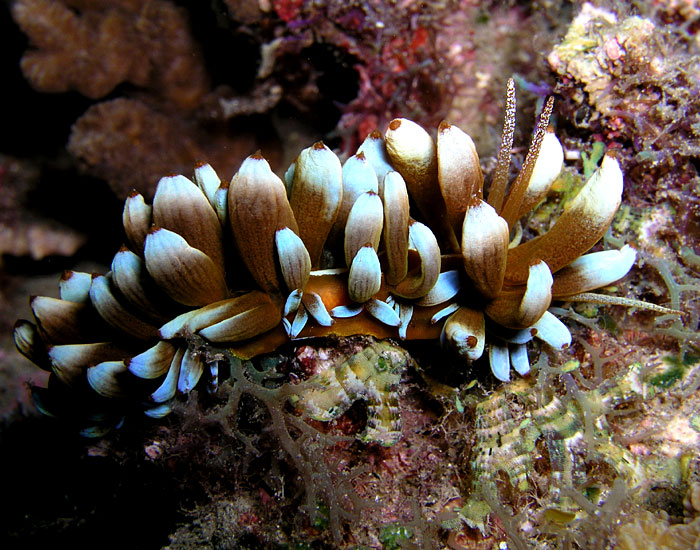
- Phyllodesmium kabiranum, head end towards the right

Scientific classification
- Kingdom: Animalia
- Phylum: Mollusca
- Class: Gastropoda
- Order: Nudibranchia
- Suborder: Aeolidacea
- Family: Myrrhinidae
- Genus: Phyllodesmium
- Species: P. kabiranum

Binomial name
- Phyllodesmium kabiranum Baba, 1991

= Phyllodesmium kabiranum =

Species of gastropod

Phyllodesmium kabiranum is a species of sea slug, an aeolid nudibranch, a marine gastropod mollusc in the family Facelinidae.

== Distribution ==
The type locality for Phyllodesmium kabiranum is Ishigaki, Okinawa, Japan. It has also been reported from the Philippines, Malaysia and Indonesia.

== Description ==
This is a large species of Phyllodesmium which has been reported to grow to 75 mm in length.

This species contains zooxanthellae.

== Ecology ==
The food species for Phyllodesmium kabiranum is a xeniid soft coral.
