= Phyllodesmium guamense =

Scientific classification
- Kingdom: Animalia
- Phylum: Mollusca
- Class: Gastropoda
- Order: Nudibranchia
- Suborder: Cladobranchia
- Family: Myrrhinidae
- Genus: Phyllodesmium
- Species: P. guamense

Binomial name
- Phyllodesmium guamense Avila, Ballesteros, Slattery, Starmer & Paul, 1998

Species of gastropod

Phyllodesmium guamense is a species of sea slug, an aeolid nudibranch, a marine gastropod mollusc in the family Facelinidae.

The specific name guamense refers to the island of Guam, its type locality.

== Distribution ==
The type locality of Phyllodesmium guamense is Piti, Guam, Micronesia. Additional specimens were found in Cocos Island Lagoon nearby.

== Description ==
Phyllodesmium guamense uses camouflage and it looks like the soft coral Sinularia. The maximum recorded length of the slug is 48 mm. This species contains zooxanthellae which are distributed throughout the inflated cerata.

== Ecology ==
Phyllodesmium guamense feeds on Sinularia polydactyla, Sinularia maxima and Sinularia sp.
