= Phyllodesmium karenae =

Scientific classification
- Kingdom: Animalia
- Phylum: Mollusca
- Class: Gastropoda
- Order: Nudibranchia
- Suborder: Aeolidacea
- Family: Myrrhinidae
- Genus: Phyllodesmium
- Species: P. karenae

Binomial name
- Phyllodesmium karenae Moore & Gosliner, 2009

Species of gastropod

Phyllodesmium karenae is a species of sea slug, an aeolid nudibranch, a marine gastropod mollusc in the family Facelinidae.

== Distribution ==
This species was described from Matotonggil Rock, Mabini, Batangas Province, Luzon Island, Philippines.
