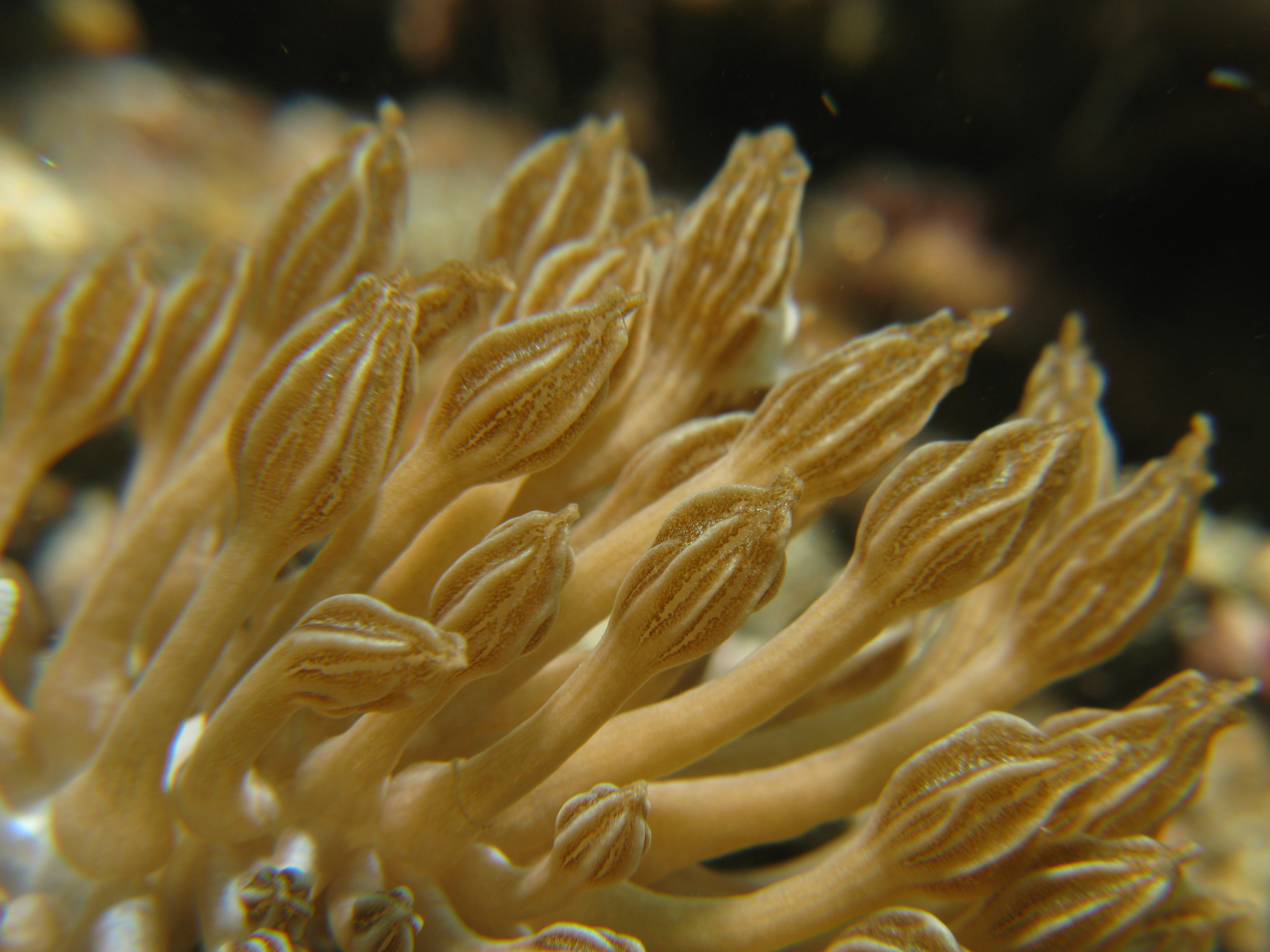
- detail of cerata of Phyllodesmium rudmani

Scientific classification
- Kingdom: Animalia
- Phylum: Mollusca
- Class: Gastropoda
- Order: Nudibranchia
- Suborder: Aeolidacea
- Family: Myrrhinidae
- Genus: Phyllodesmium
- Species: P. rudmani

Binomial name
- Phyllodesmium rudmani Burghardt & Gosliner, 2006

= Phyllodesmium rudmani =

Species of gastropod

Phyllodesmium rudmani is a species of sea slug, an aeolid nudibranch, a marine gastropod mollusc in the family Facelinidae.

The specific name rudmani is in honor of malacologist William B. Rudman.

== Distribution ==
The distribution of Phyllodesmium rudmani includes North Sulawesi, Indonesia and Luzon, the Philippines.

== Description ==
The length of the slug is up to 45 mm. Its cerata are similar to (mimicry) closed polyps of soft coral of the genus Xenia.

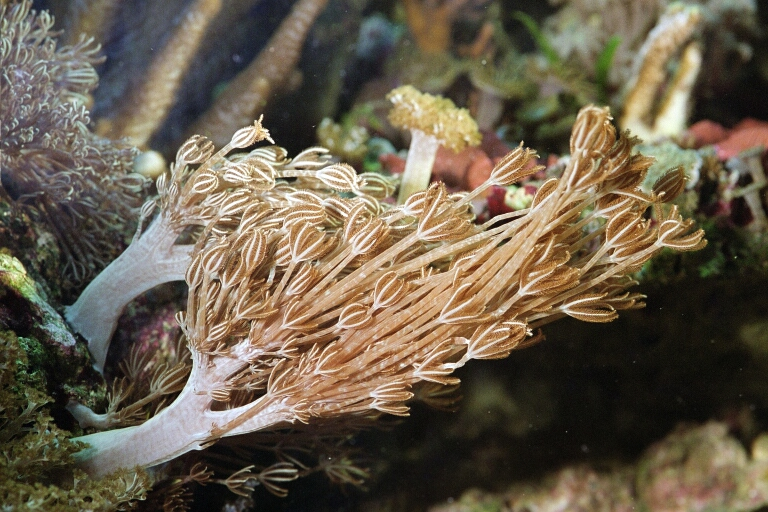
soft coral Xenia sp.

Phyllodesmium rudmani contain endosymbiotic zooxanthellae of the genus Symbiodinium.
