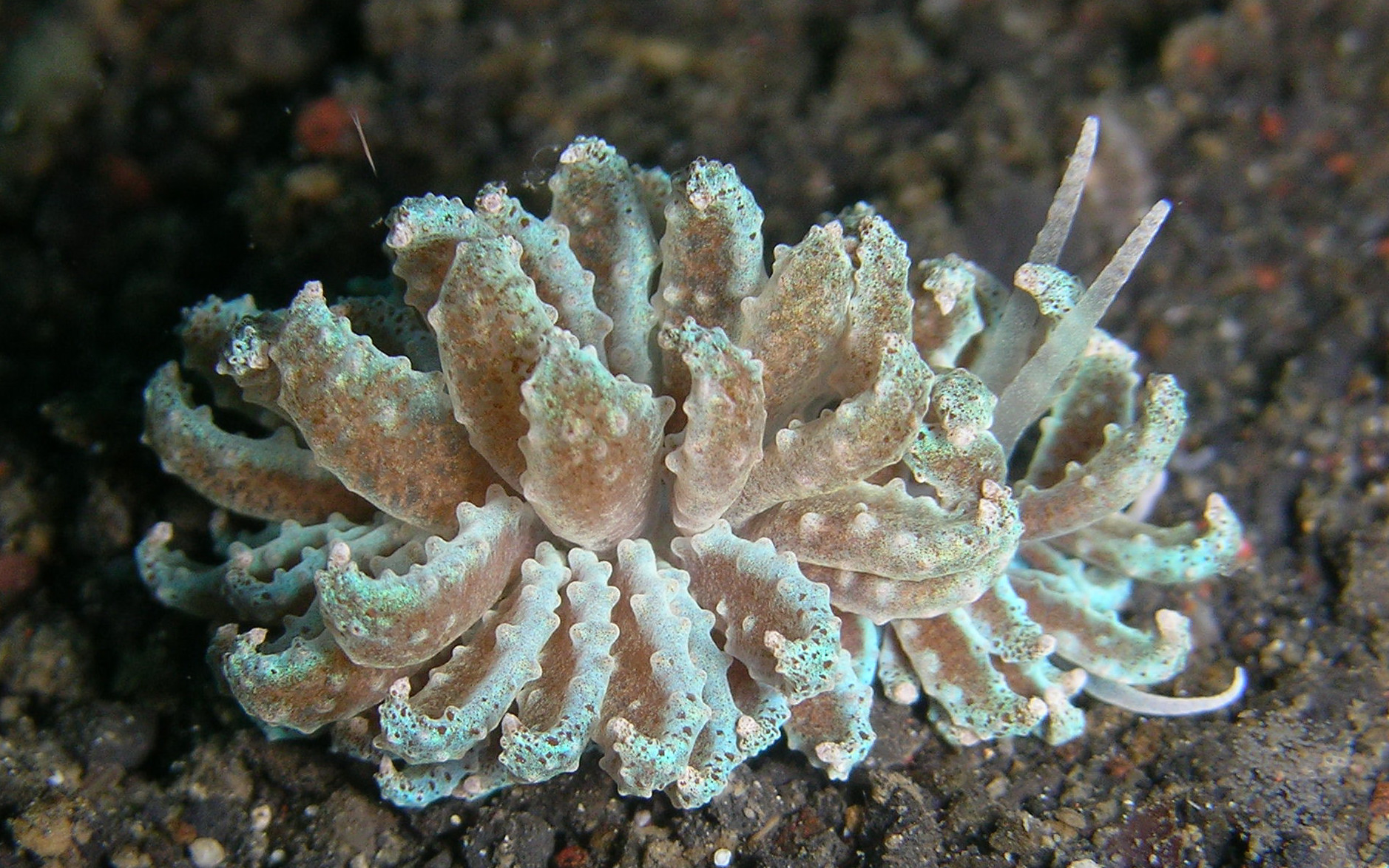
- Phyllodesmium crypticum from Bitung, North Sulawesi, head end towards the right

Scientific classification
- Kingdom: Animalia
- Phylum: Mollusca
- Class: Gastropoda
- Order: Nudibranchia
- Suborder: Aeolidacea
- Family: Myrrhinidae
- Genus: Phyllodesmium
- Species: P. crypticum

Binomial name
- Phyllodesmium crypticum Rudman, 1981

Synonyms
- Phyllodesmium cryptica

= Phyllodesmium crypticum =

Species of gastropod

Phyllodesmium crypticum is a species of sea slug, an aeolid nudibranch, a marine gastropod mollusc in the family Facelinidae.

== Distribution ==
This species was described from Angourie, northern New South Wales, Australia. It has been reported from Indonesia and the Red Sea.

== Description ==
Phyllodesmium crypticum uses camouflage and looks like the soft coral Xenia amongst which it is normally found. The length of the slug is 45–60 mm. This species contains zooxanthellae and has cerata which have a most distinctive shape. They are dorso-ventrally flattened and quadrangular in cross-section. A row of nodules runs up each of the four edges of the ceras and there are also scattered nodules on the two flat sides.

== Ecology ==
Phyllodesmium crypticum feeds on Xenia.
