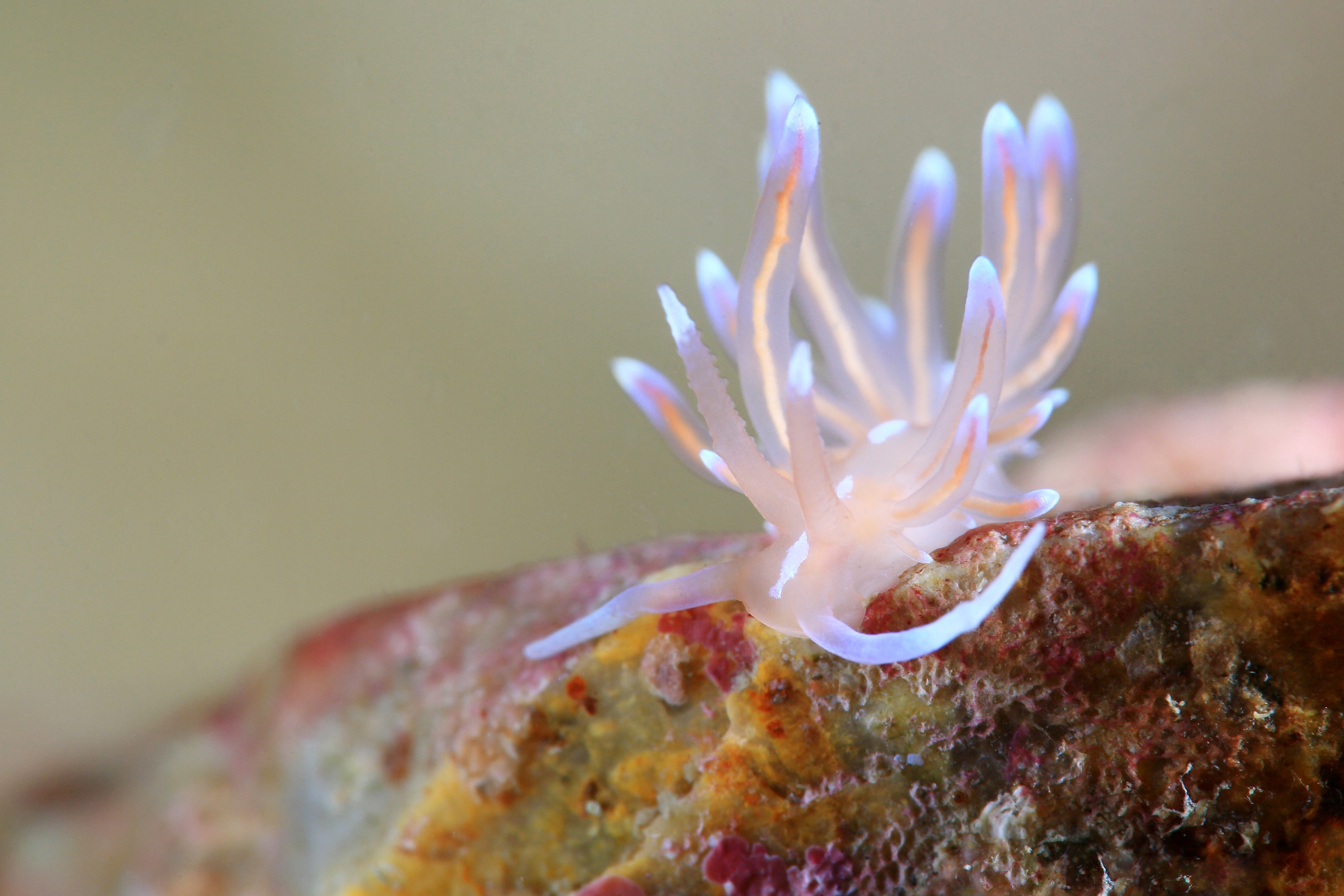

Scientific classification
- Kingdom: Animalia
- Phylum: Mollusca
- Class: Gastropoda
- Order: Nudibranchia
- Suborder: Aeolidacea
- Family: Myrrhinidae
- Genus: Phyllodesmium
- Species: P. opalescens

Binomial name
- Phyllodesmium opalescens Rudman, 1991

= Phyllodesmium opalescens =

Species of gastropod

Phyllodesmium opalescens is a species of sea slug, an aeolid nudibranch, a marine gastropod mollusc in the family Facelinidae.

== Distribution ==
The type locality of Phyllodesmium opalescens is Mirs Bay, Hong Kong. It has been reported from Korea and the Philippines.

== Description ==
This species grows to 20 mm in length. It does not sequester zooxanthellae.

== Ecology ==
The food of Phyllodesmium opalescens is unknown.
