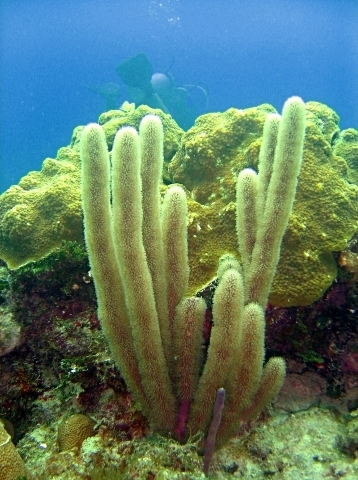
- In Pinar del Río Province, Cuba

Scientific classification
- Kingdom: Animalia
- Phylum: Cnidaria
- Subphylum: Anthozoa
- Class: Octocorallia
- Order: Scleralcyonacea
- Family: Briareidae
- Genus: Briareum
- Species: B. asbestinum

Binomial name
- Briareum asbestinum (Pallas, 1766)

Synonyms
- List: Alcyonium asbestinum Pallas, 1766; Ammothea polyanthes Duchassaing & Michelotti, 1860; Asbestia asbestinum (Pallas, 1766); Briarea asbestina (Pallas, 1766); Briareum gorgonoideum Blainville, 1830; Briareum marquesarum (Kükenthal, 1916); Briareum polyanthes (Duchassaing & Michelotti, 1860); Erythropodium marquesarum Kükenthal, 1916; Erythropodium polyanthes (Duchassaing & Michelotti, 1860); Gorgonia briareus Ellis & Solander, 1786; Lobularia asbestina (Pallas, 1766); Nephthya polyanthus (Duchassaing & Michelotti, 1860); Solenopodium marquesarum (Kükenthal, 1916); Solenopodium polyanthes (Duchassaing & Michelotti, 1860); Titanideum hartmeyeri Kükenthal, 1908; Vioa asbestina (Pallas, 1766)

= Briareum asbestinum =

Corky sea finger

Species of coral

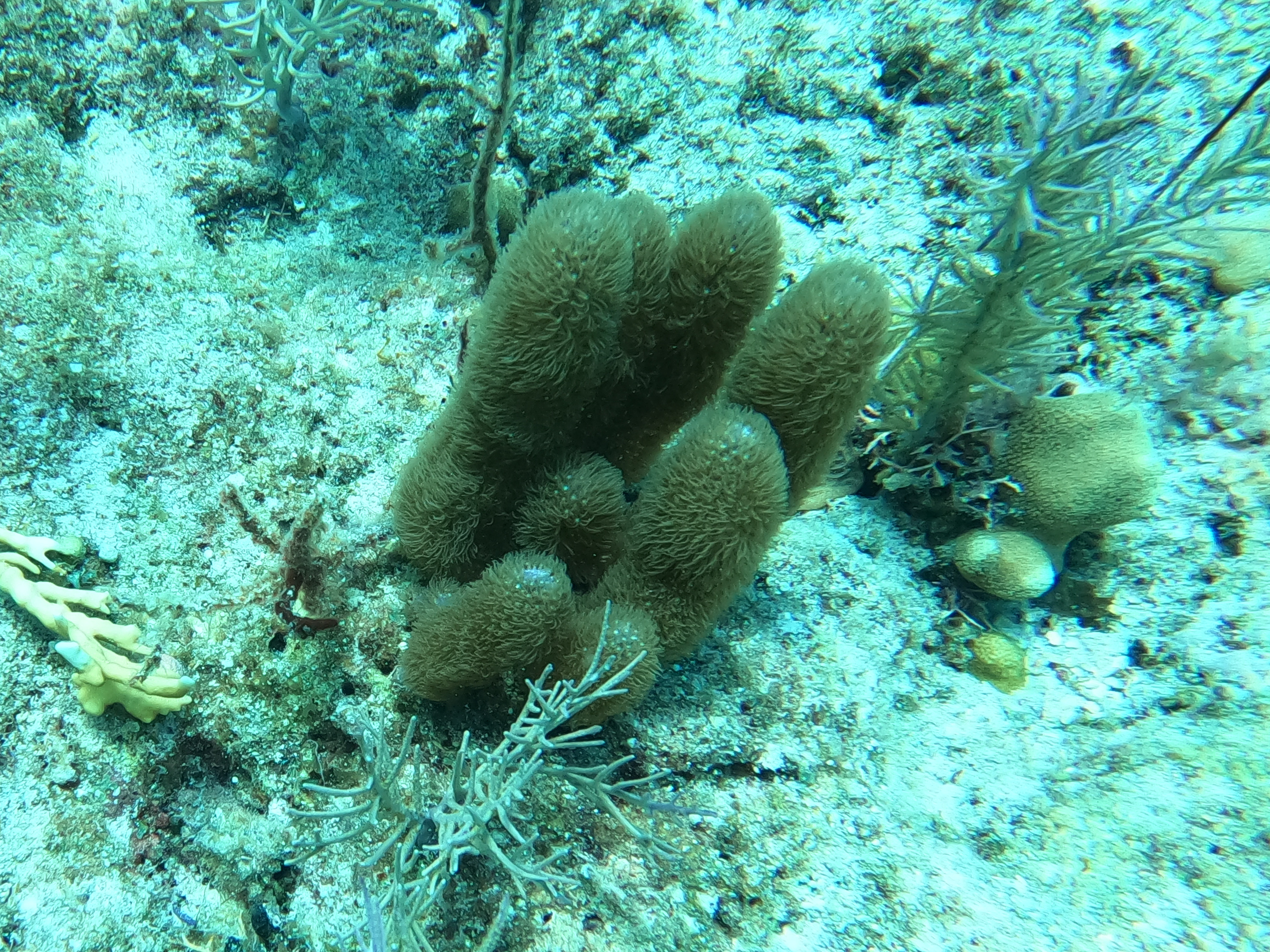
Small colony at Molasses Reef in 2023

Briareum asbestinum, commonly known as the corky sea finger, is a species of a soft coral in the family Briareidae. It inhabits coral reefs and rocky bottoms in the Caribbean, Bahamas, and Florida, often growing to 30 cm at depths of one to 40 metres.

== Taxonomy and systematics ==
Although different in form, and different enough genetically to be considered as separate populations, the small encrusting polyps of Briareum asbestinum that grow on surfaces are still considered as conspecific with the larger, tall tube-shaped form.

== Description ==
This species grows large vertical cylindrical tubes or "fingers". These fingers are usually un-branched and may reach up to one metre in length. The morphology of the fingers varies as those found in shallow (5m) water depth are shorter and stouter than those found at the deeper (35m) sites. Shallow water morphs also have shorter sclerites than their deepwater counterparts.This phenotypic plasticity results from unknown environmental factors, but may be the result of predation, light density reductions with depth, or increased fragility in shallow waters.

Polyp density and colony thickness is also reduced at deeper depths. The polyps are over 1cm in size, which produce a hairy appearance to the surface of the coral. This surface may be purple, grey, tan, brown or greenish-brown in colour underneath.

== Distribution and habitat ==
Briareum asbestinum is found in shallow tropical waters of the western Atlantic Ocean and Caribbean Sea in depths up to 35m. It can be abundant in back-reef areas, on areas of coral rubble, and is also found in seagrass beds.

== Behaviour and ecology ==
Briareum asbestinum can reproduce both sexually, by the annual release of gametes into the water column, and vegetatively by the growth of broken fragments that settle to the ocean floor and can colonize a suitable site.

== Threats ==
Briareum asbestinum is threatened by rising ocean temperatures that cause coral bleaching.
