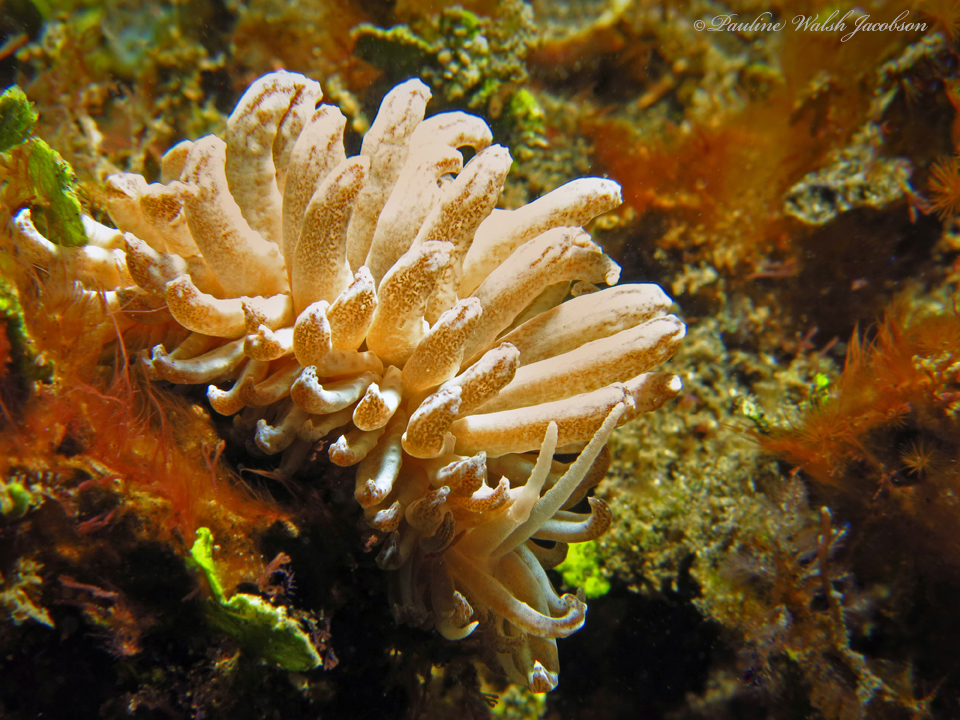

Scientific classification
- Kingdom: Animalia
- Phylum: Mollusca
- Class: Gastropoda
- Order: Nudibranchia
- Suborder: Aeolidacea
- Family: Myrrhinidae
- Genus: Phyllodesmium
- Species: P. hyalinum

Binomial name
- Phyllodesmium hyalinum Ehrenberg, 1831

Synonyms
- Phyllodesmium xeniae Gohar & Aboul-Ela, 1957; Favorinus horridus brevitentaculatus Engel & van Eeken, 1962

= Phyllodesmium hyalinum =

Species of gastropod

Phyllodesmium hyalinum is a species of sea slug, an aeolid nudibranch, a marine gastropod mollusc in the family Myrrhinidae.

Phyllodesmium hyalinum is the type species of the genus Phyllodesmium.

== Distribution ==
This species was described from the Red Sea. The distribution of Phyllodesmium hyalinum includes Tanzania, Australia, Japan, Philippines and the Marshall Islands.

== Description ==
The length of this sea slug is up to 45 mm. It is a pale pink-blue, mottled species, with loosely spaced cerata. This species contains zooxanthellae.

== Ecology ==
The habitat of Phyllodesmium hyalinum is among shallow coral reefs with Xenia octocorals. It feeds on Xenia, Xenia umbellata and Heteroxenia fuscescens. This species is more frequently recorded as an incidental to research carried out on its prey species, the alcyonarians Xenia and Heteroxenia. It is camouflaged by the similarity of its cerata to the tentacles of these corals and hides in burrows made in the fleshy base of the Xenia.
