= Phyllodesmium orientale =

Scientific classification
- Kingdom: Animalia
- Phylum: Mollusca
- Class: Gastropoda
- Order: Nudibranchia
- Suborder: Aeolidacea
- Family: Myrrhinidae
- Genus: Phyllodesmium
- Species: P. orientale

Binomial name
- Phyllodesmium orientale Baba, 1991

Species of mollusc

Phyllodesmium orientale is a species of small sea slug, an aolid nudibranch, a marine gastropod mollusk in the family Facelinidae.
