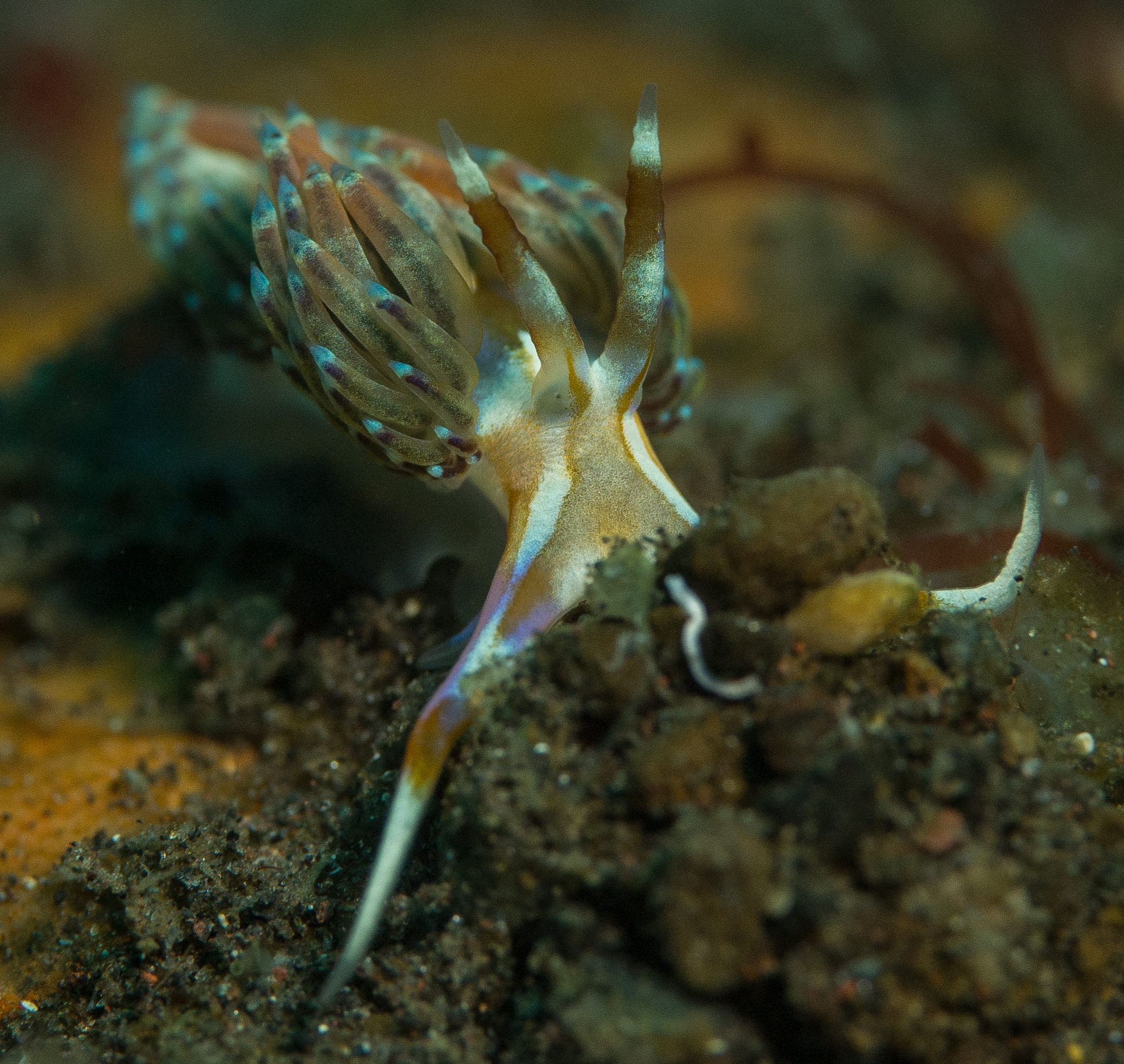

Scientific classification
- Kingdom: Animalia
- Phylum: Mollusca
- Class: Gastropoda
- Order: Nudibranchia
- Suborder: Aeolidacea
- Family: Myrrhinidae
- Genus: Godiva
- Species: G. rachelae

Binomial name
- Godiva rachelae Rudman, 1980

= Godiva rachelae =

Species of gastropod

Godiva rachelae is a species of sea slug, a nudibranch, a shell-less marine gastropod mollusc in the family Myrrhinidae.

== Distribution ==
This species was described from Tanzania. It has been reported from Queensland, Australia.

== Description ==
Godiva rachelae is a slender pale-bodied nudibranch with many cerata with a purple band near the tip. Its head has a pair of brown lines running into the oral tentacles which have two translucent purple bands.

== Ecology ==
Godiva rachelae preys on hydroids.
