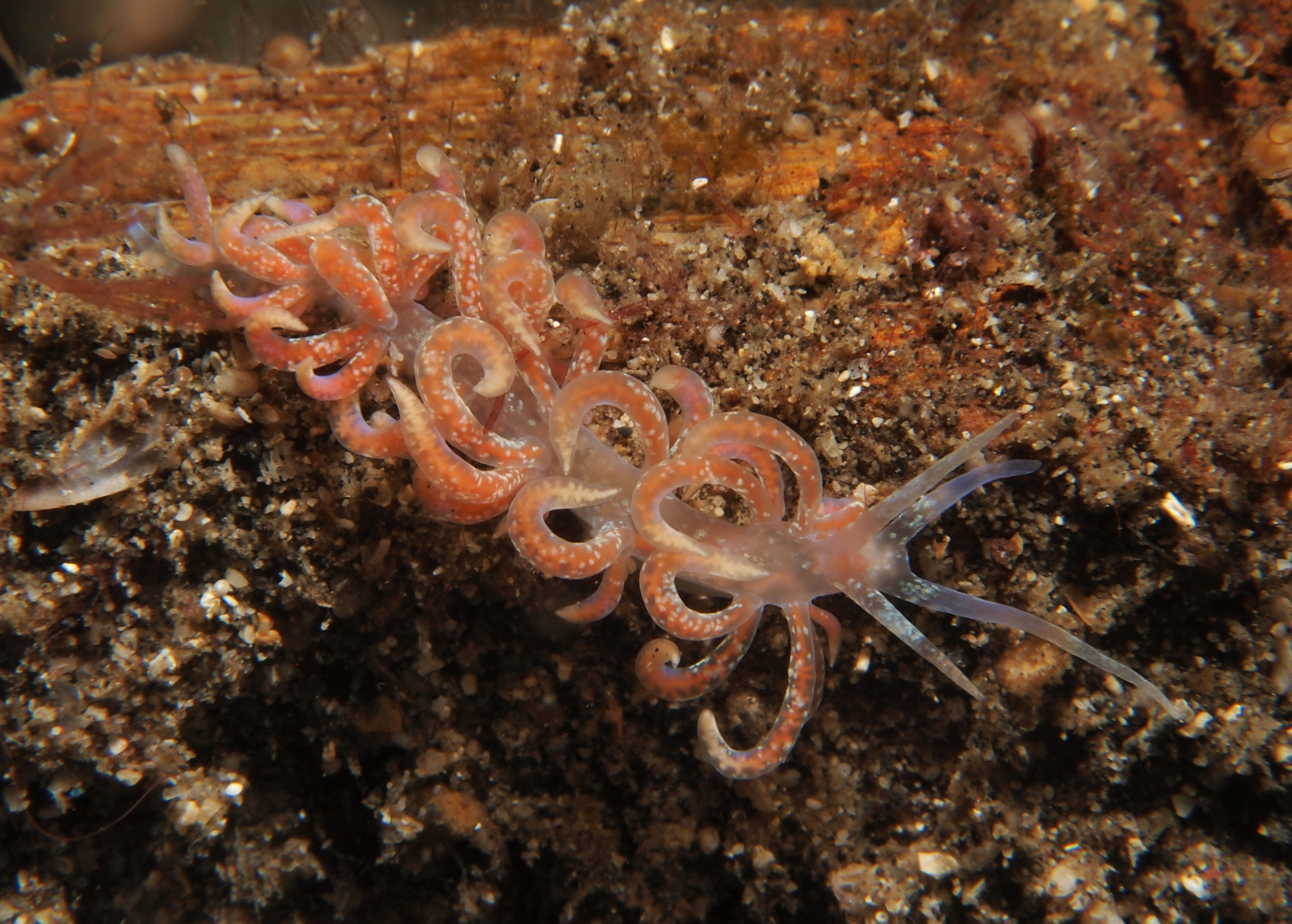

Scientific classification
- Kingdom: Animalia
- Phylum: Mollusca
- Class: Gastropoda
- Order: Nudibranchia
- Suborder: Cladobranchia
- Family: Myrrhinidae
- Genus: Phyllodesmium
- Species: P. poindimiei

Binomial name
- Phyllodesmium poindimiei (Risbec, 1928)

Synonyms
- Aeolidia poindimiei; Phestilla poindimiei; (?) Phidiana tenuis

= Phyllodesmium poindimiei =

Species of gastropod

Phyllodesmium poindimiei (AKA: Spun Of Light) is a species of aeolid nudibranch Gastropod belonging to the family Facelinidae that feeds on Alcyonacea. Cerata are important for its physical defense and efficient metabolic processes, but unlike other species in the Opisthobranch Mollusca clade, P. poindimiei’s pink cerata are used for defensive purposes other than Nematocyst (dinoflagellate) capture and toxin release. This species is spread sporadically along tropical coastal regions such as Australia, Hawaii, and the Indo-Pacific living in diverse marine habitats such as coral reefs.

== Evolution and description ==
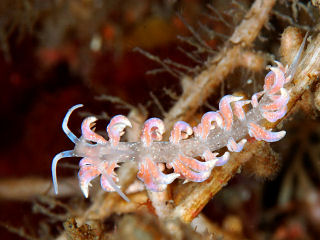
Phyllodesmium poindimiei is shown to have translucent pink cerata lining the aboral surface and two pairs of olfactory tentacles with an eye at each base.

P. poindimiei is about 50 mm at its longest. P. poindimiei typically has two pairs of tentacles with a built in olfactory system containing an eye at each base. The soft shell-less slug has cerata outgrowths on its upper side filled with the organism’s respiratory and digestive systems which can be cast off for protective purposes. Cerata for most Phyllodesmium contain cnidosacs at the tips to digest and repurpose nematocysts from Cnidarian prey, such as jellyfish or corals. P. poindimiei lack these cnidosacs that could be used for its own defense against predators, such as the swimming crab Thalamita integer. Another modification this species lacks is the ability to accumulate zooxanthellae, microscopic photosynthetic dinoflagellates, in its cerata. The non-symbiotic species such as P. poindimiei were thought to have evolved earlier than nudibranchs with such developments.

== Diet and growth ==
P. poindimiei live up to twelve months and develop from an egg to a free-swimming veliger larva. They feed on Telesto, Caridoa, and other Alcyonaceans with very small radula. Sponges can act as epibionts or ectozoans on organisms such as Octocorallia and prevent P. poindimiei from consuming them, which can be problematic for these picky eaters.

== Ecology and conservation ==
P. poindimiei tends to live in coral reefs. Many of the tropical locations where P. poindimiei resides are climate change research biotopes. Environment change is effectively studied using these animals because of their short life span and revival linkage to habitats sensitive to oceanic temperature change and coral bleaching. Most species of Phyllodesmium are found along the coastline of Australia, Hawaii, and the Indo-Pacific regions. Coastal channels and estuaries allow for ample shelter.
