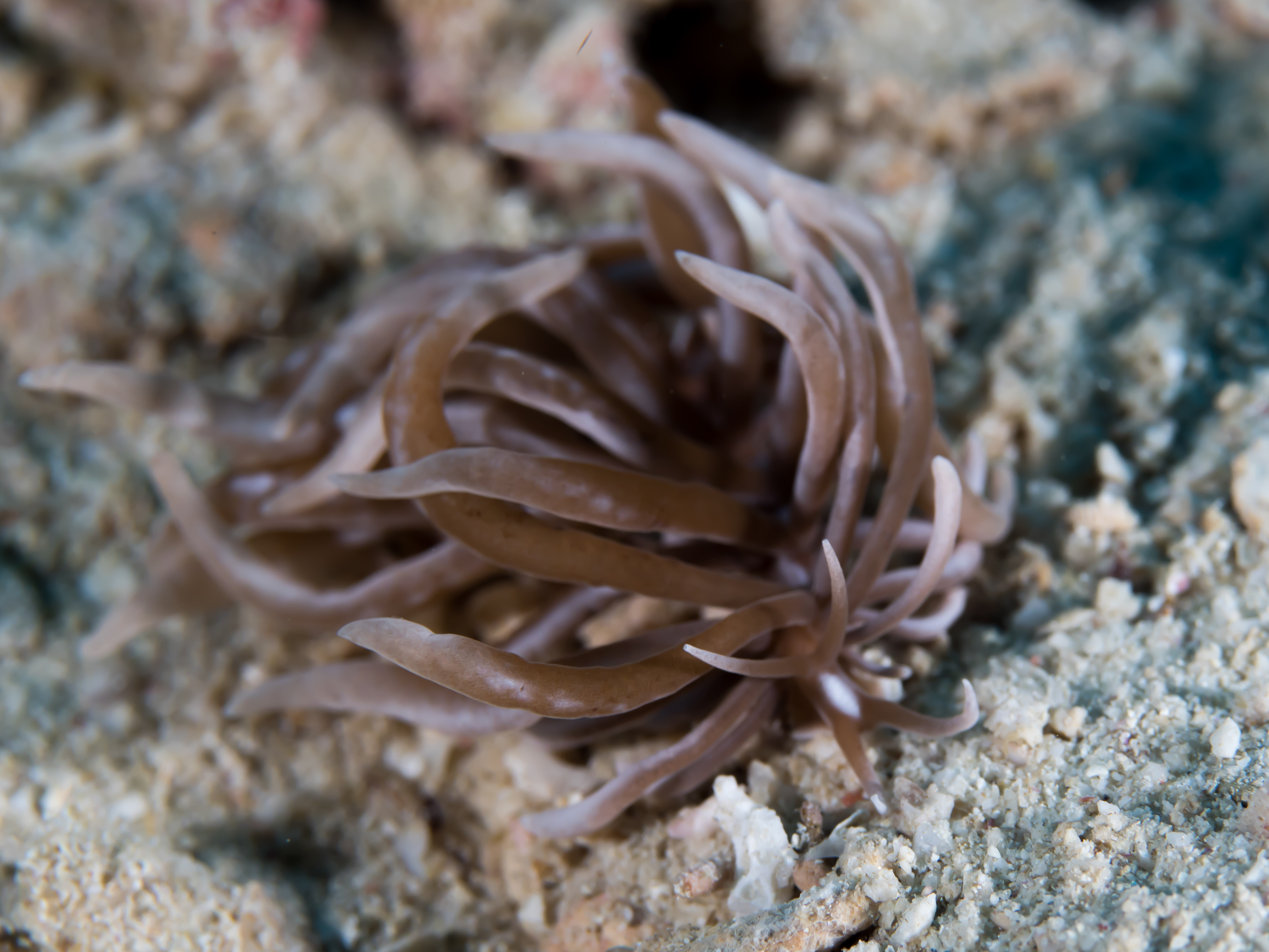

Scientific classification
- Kingdom: Animalia
- Phylum: Mollusca
- Class: Gastropoda
- Order: Nudibranchia
- Suborder: Aeolidacea
- Family: Myrrhinidae
- Genus: Phyllodesmium
- Species: P. colemani

Binomial name
- Phyllodesmium colemani Rudman, 1991

= Phyllodesmium colemani =

Species of gastropod

Phyllodesmium colemani is a species of sea slug, an aeolid nudibranch, a marine gastropod mollusc in the family Facelinidae.

== Distribution ==
This species was described from Lord Howe Island, Australia where it was discovered by Neville Coleman. It is also known from the Philippines and the area of the central Indo-Pacific Ocean.

== Description ==
Phyllodesmium colemani uses camouflage and hides amongst the polyps of Tubipora musica on which it feeds. The length of the slug is 18 mm. This species contains zooxanthellae which are stored in aggregations of terminal chambers all over the ceratal wall.

== Ecology ==
Phyllodesmium colemani feeds on Organ pipe coral Tubipora musica usually in very shallow water, typically 2–5 m depth.
