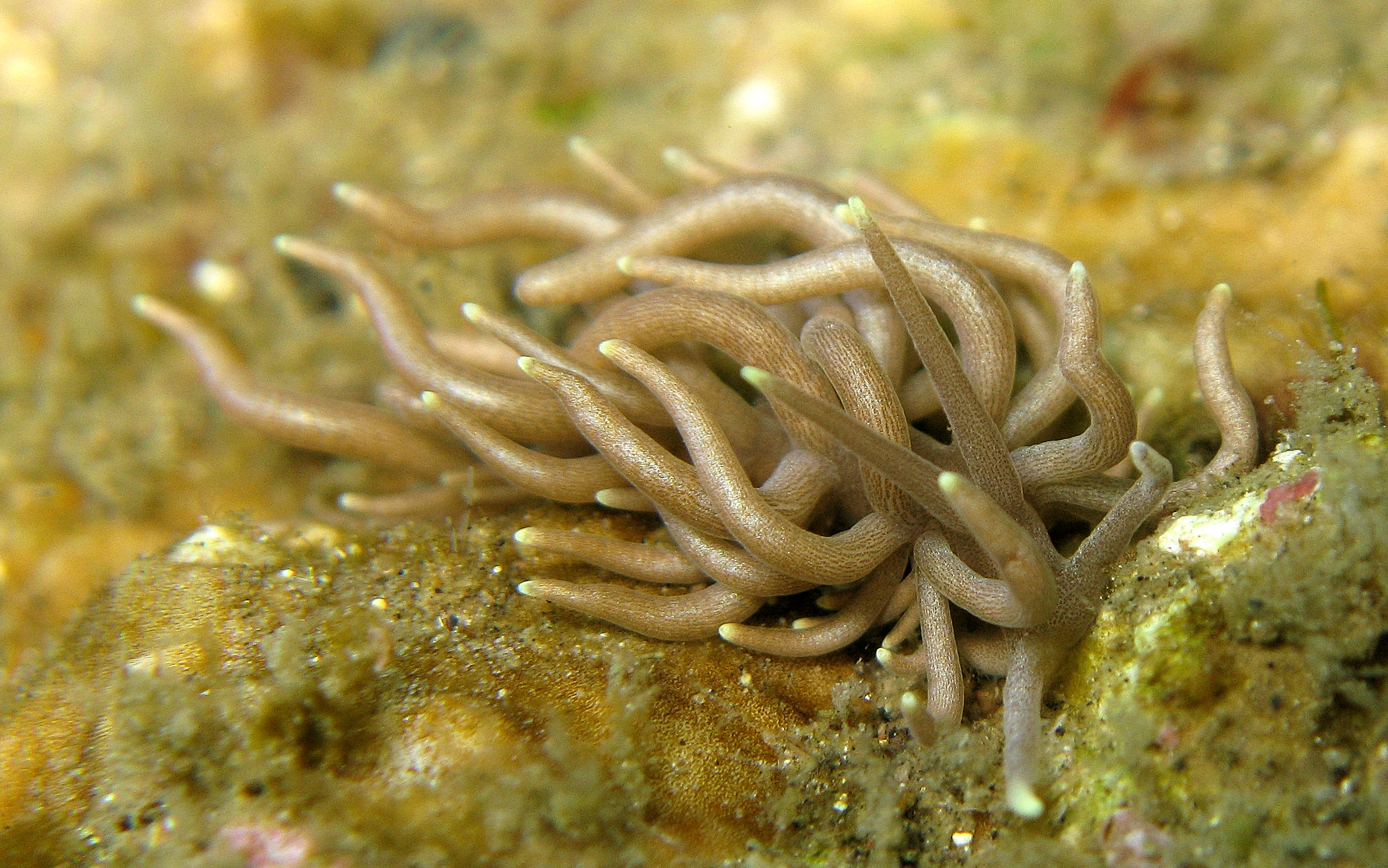
- A live individual of Phyllodesmium briareum, head end towards the front

Scientific classification
- Kingdom: Animalia
- Phylum: Mollusca
- Class: Gastropoda
- Order: Nudibranchia
- Suborder: Aeolidacea
- Family: Myrrhinidae
- Genus: Phyllodesmium; Ehrenberg, 1831 (1828)

Type species
- Phyllodesmium hyalinum Ehrenberg, 1831

Diversity
- 27 species (in this list)

Synonyms
- Ennoia Bergh, 1896; Myrrhine Bergh, 1905

= Phyllodesmium =

Genus of gastropods

Phyllodesmium is a genus of predatory sea slugs, aeolid nudibranchs, marine gastropod molluscs in the family Myrrhinidae.

These nudibranchs occur in the tropical Indo-Pacific Ocean and warm temperate waters of Japan, Tasmania and South Africa.

The nudibranchs in this genus often show extraordinary mimicry, each species very closely resembling its prey species, which are octocorals, a kind of soft coral.

Some of the species are also unusual in that they are able to utilize zooxanthellae from their prey, in a symbiotic relationship that provides them with extra nutrition from photosynthesis, hence they are commonly called "solar-powered" sea slugs (also see the Sacoglossa).

All species Phyllodesmium, with the exception of Phyllodesmium jakobsenae, lack the ability to sting predators via cnidosacs, a feature that is common in most Aeolids. While Phyllodesmium cerata do have distal sacs, they are empty, lacking nematocysts stolen from the Cnidarians they consume.

== Species ==
Species within the genus Phyllodesmium include:

- Phyllodesmium acanthorhinum Moore & Gosliner, 2014
- Phyllodesmium briareum (Bergh, 1896)
- Phyllodesmium colemani Rudman, 1991
- Phyllodesmium crypticum Rudman, 1981
- Phyllodesmium fastuosum Ehrenberg, 1831
- Phyllodesmium guamense C. Ávila, Ballesteros, Slattery, Starmer & Paul, 1998
- Phyllodesmium horridum (Macnae, 1954)
- Phyllodesmium hyalinum Ehrenberg, 1831 - type species
- Phyllodesmium iriomotense Baba, 1991
- Phyllodesmium jakobsenae Burghardt & Wägele, 2004
- Phyllodesmium kabiranum Baba, 1991
- Phyllodesmium karenae Moore & Gosliner, 2009
- Phyllodesmium koehleri Burghardt, Schrödl & Wägele, 2008
- Phyllodesmium lembehense Burghardt, Schrödl & Wägele, 2008
- Phyllodesmium lizardense Burghardt, Schrödl & Wägele, 2008
- Phyllodesmium longicirrum (Bergh, 1905)
- Phyllodesmium macphersonae (Burn, 1962)
- Phyllodesmium magnum Rudman, 1991
- Phyllodesmium opalescens Rudman, 1991
- Phyllodesmium parangatum Ortiz & Gosliner, 2003
- Phyllodesmium pecten Rudman, 1981
- Phyllodesmium pinnatum Moore & Gosliner, 2009
- Phyllodesmium poindimiei (Risbec, 1928)
- Phyllodesmium rudmani Burghardt & Gosliner, 2006
- Phyllodesmium serratum (Baba, 1949)
- Phyllodesmium tuberculatum Moore & Gosliner, 2009
- Phyllodesmium undulatum Moore & Gosliner, 2014

Species brought into synonymy

- Phyllodesmium xeniae Gohar & Aboul-Ela, 1957: synonym of Phyllodesmium hyalinum Ehrenberg, 1831

Species with unknown placement

- Phyllodesmium orientale Baba, 1991
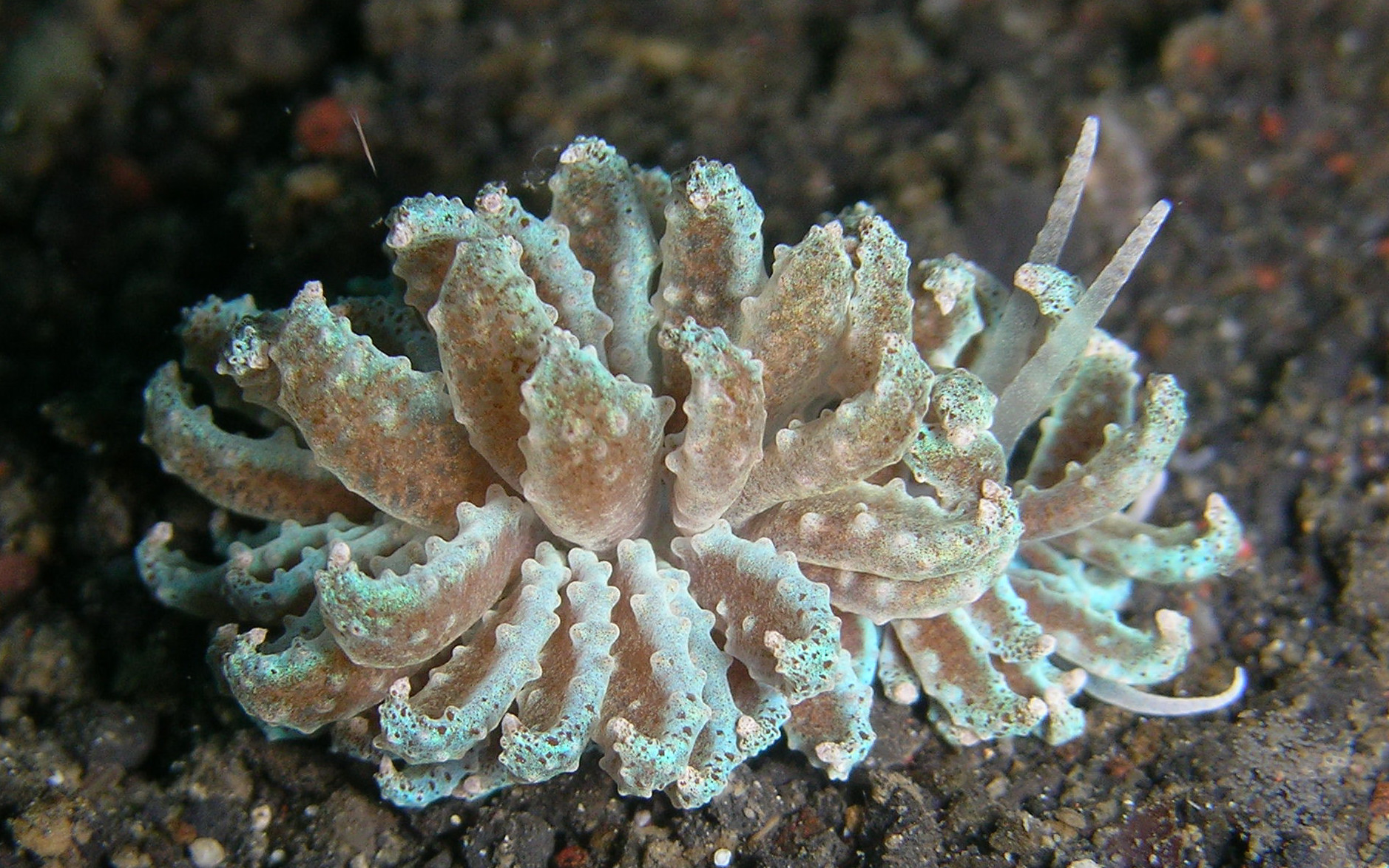
Phyllodesmium crypticum

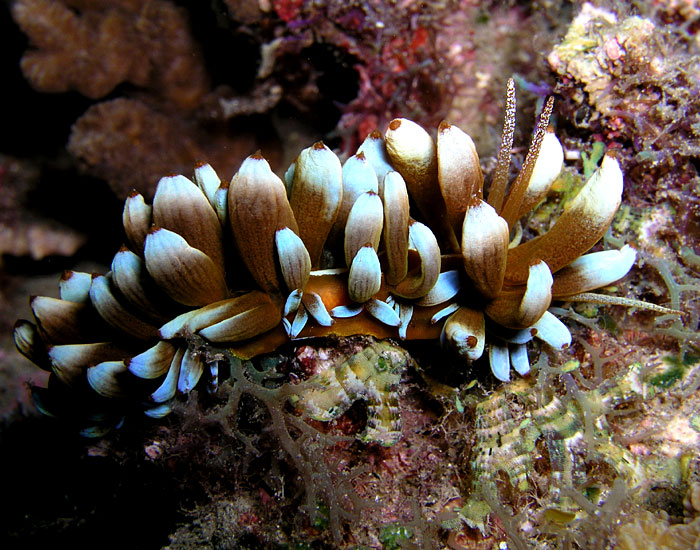
Phyllodesmium kabiranum

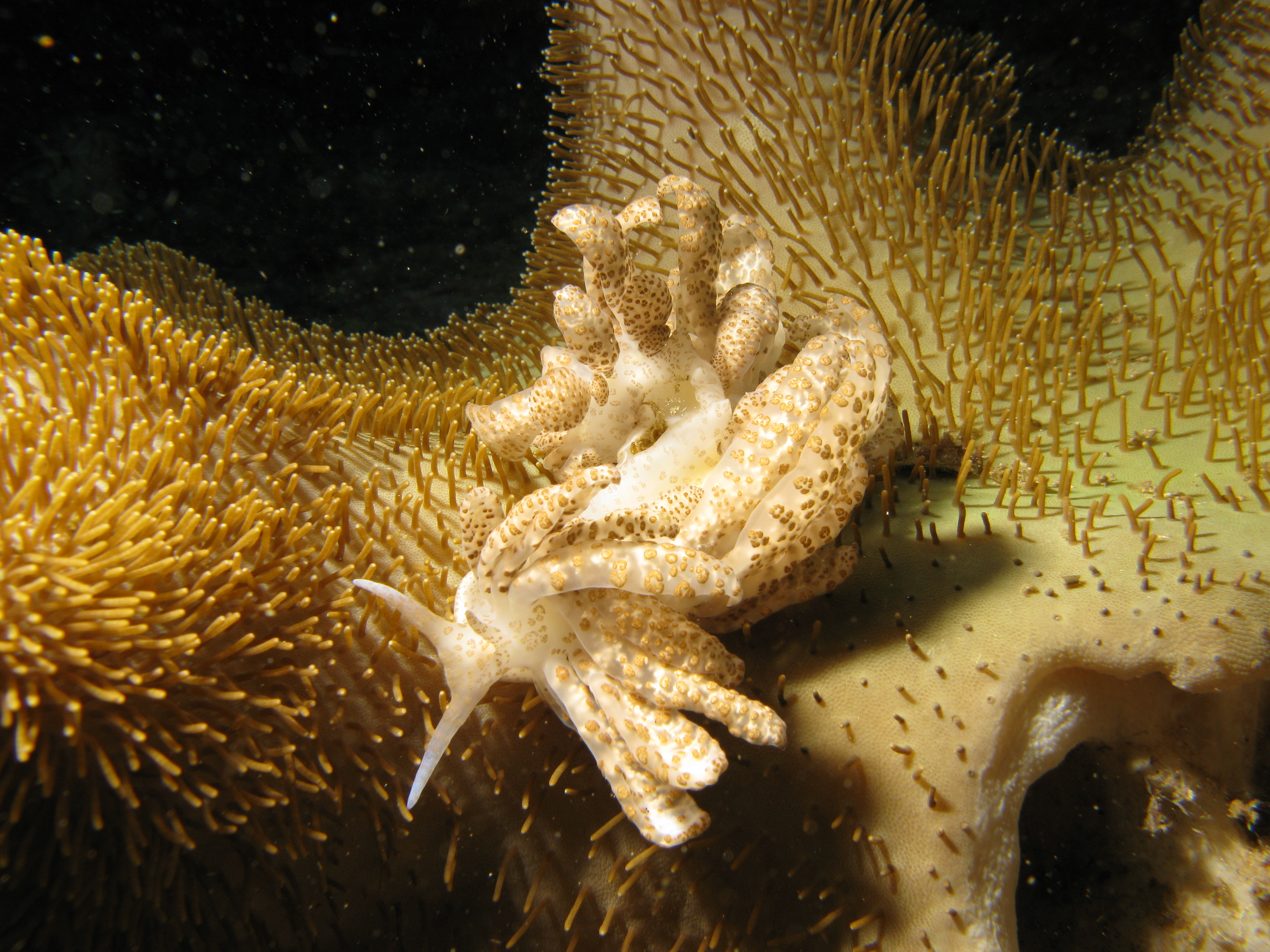
Phyllodesmium longicirrum

== Ecology ==
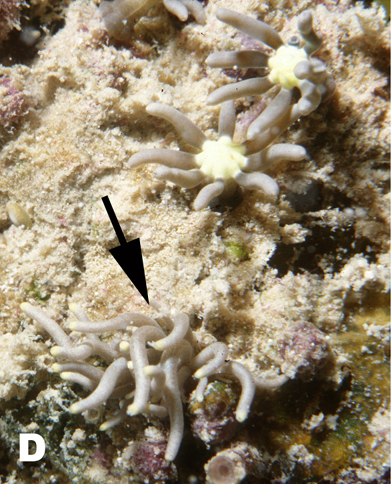
Phyllodesmium briareum (one specimen at the bottom of the image) and its food species, the coral Briareum violaceum (at the top of the image), showing how closely the nudibranch resembles its food source. It camouflages itself well from predators.

Species of the genus Phyllodesmium are carnivorous and feed on octocorals (for example, in the family Xeniidae). This is a unique feature within the Aeolidida.

Some of these nudibranchs contain endosymbiotic zooxanthellae, which are in effect single-celled plants. Zooxanthellae are one kind of dinoflagellate protists and they live only within other organisms, most notably in corals. The nudibranchs in this genus obtain zooxanthellae from their food, the soft corals. As they previously did within the corals, the zooxanthellae provide the nudibranch with a supply of food in the form of the products of photosynthesis. The nudibranchs are able to avoid digesting these protists, and sequester them in their tissues instead. This process is somewhat reminiscent of the relationship between the Sacoglossan sea slugs and the living chloroplasts that they are able to sequester. Both these nudibranchs and the sacoglossans have been referred to as "solar-powered sea slugs".

Many other species of nudibranchs have aposematic coloring in order to warn away would-be predators, giving them brilliant colors. This is because they contain in their tissues many examples of an organ called the cnidosac which contains undischarged cnidocytes (also known as nematocysts). These are stinging cells that the nudibranchs obtain from the tissues of the cnidarians they eat. Thus, the very brightly colored nudibranchs are quite unpalatable for predators. Some nudibranchs, such as Glaucus atlanticus, are even capable of giving humans painful stings.

The nudibranchs in this genus, however, use an opposite tactic. While their cerata have distal sacs, they are empty of any nematocysts, and thus they would in reality be palatable to eat for various predators (the one exceptions to this being Phyllodesmium jakobsenae). However they are almost all extremely well camouflaged, so that they resemble almost perfectly the soft coral on which they live and feed, not only in color but also in form. The shape and form of the nudibranch's cerata in each individual species very closely resembles the tentacles of the species of soft coral polyp on which that species feeds. This excellent camouflage also makes these nudibranchs difficult for humans to notice, and it is likely that several species in this genus have not yet been discovered, described, and named scientifically.

Another tactic these nudibranchs use to protect themselves is that when threatened by a predator, they can drop one or more of their cerata. These organs will wiggle for some time after being cast off, hopefully distracting a predator away from the animal itself. This is an example of a defensive technique known as autotomy.

A molecular phylogeny study of Phyllodesmium by Moore and Gosliner (2011) demonstrated that the non-symbiotic species of Phyllodesmium evolved separately from the symbiotic species of Phyllodesmium. However, there is one exception: Phyllodesmium karenae evolved in the symbiotic clade and subsequently lost its zooxanthellae.
