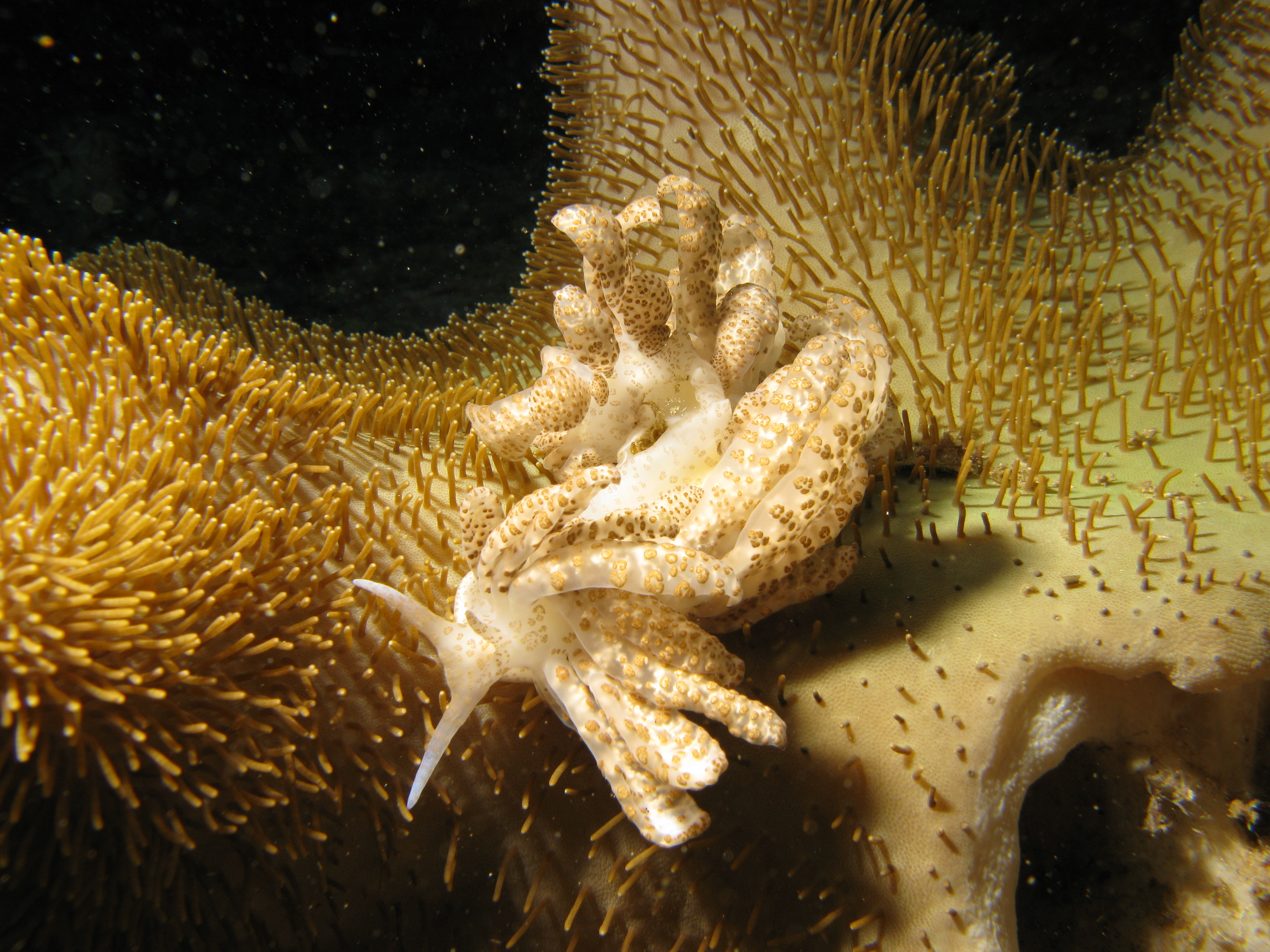
- Phyllodesmium longicirrum, head end towards the lower left, crawling on its prey the soft coral Sarcophyton trocheliophorum

Scientific classification
- Kingdom: Animalia
- Phylum: Mollusca
- Class: Gastropoda
- Order: Nudibranchia
- Suborder: Aeolidacea
- Family: Myrrhinidae
- Genus: Phyllodesmium
- Species: P. longicirrum

Binomial name
- Phyllodesmium longicirrum (Bergh, 1905)

Synonyms
- Myrrhine longicirra; Phyllodesmium longicirra

= Phyllodesmium longicirrum =

Species of gastropod

Phyllodesmium longicirrum, common name the solar-powered phyllodesmium, is a species of sea slug, an aeolid nudibranch, a marine gastropod mollusc in the family Facelinidae.

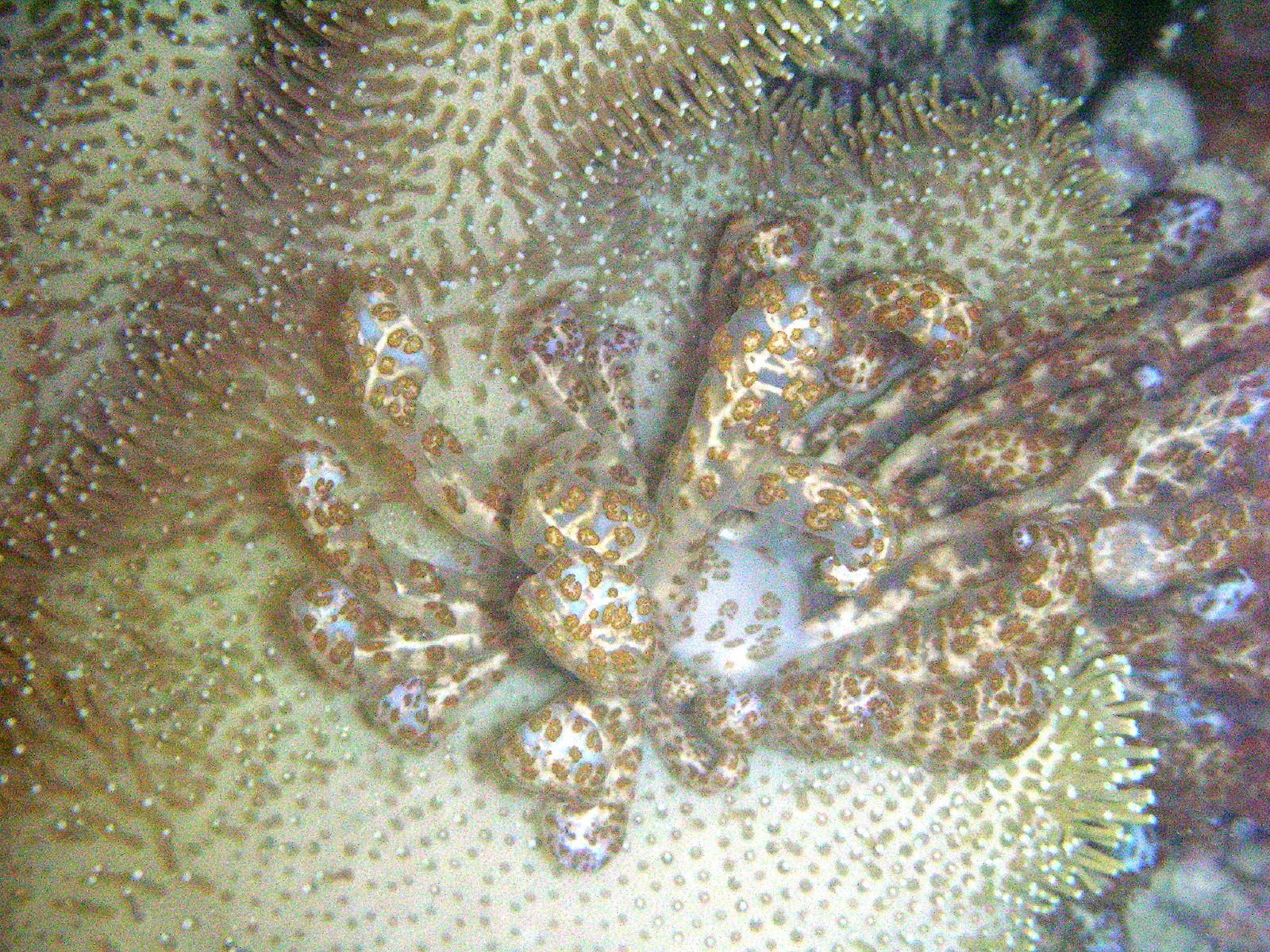
Phyllodesmium longicirrum crawling on the soft coral Sarcophyton trocheliophorum.

== Distribution ==
The distribution of Phyllodesmium longicirrum includes Australia and Indonesia.

== Description ==
This is a very large species, growing to at least 140 mm. Phyllodesmium longicirrum contains photosynthetic zooxanthellae, which allow it to draw energy from sunlight, hence its common name, the solar-powered phyllodesmium. This is actually a misleading name, as several other species of Phyllodesmium are also capable of photosynthesis, although this is developed to the greatest extreme in this species.

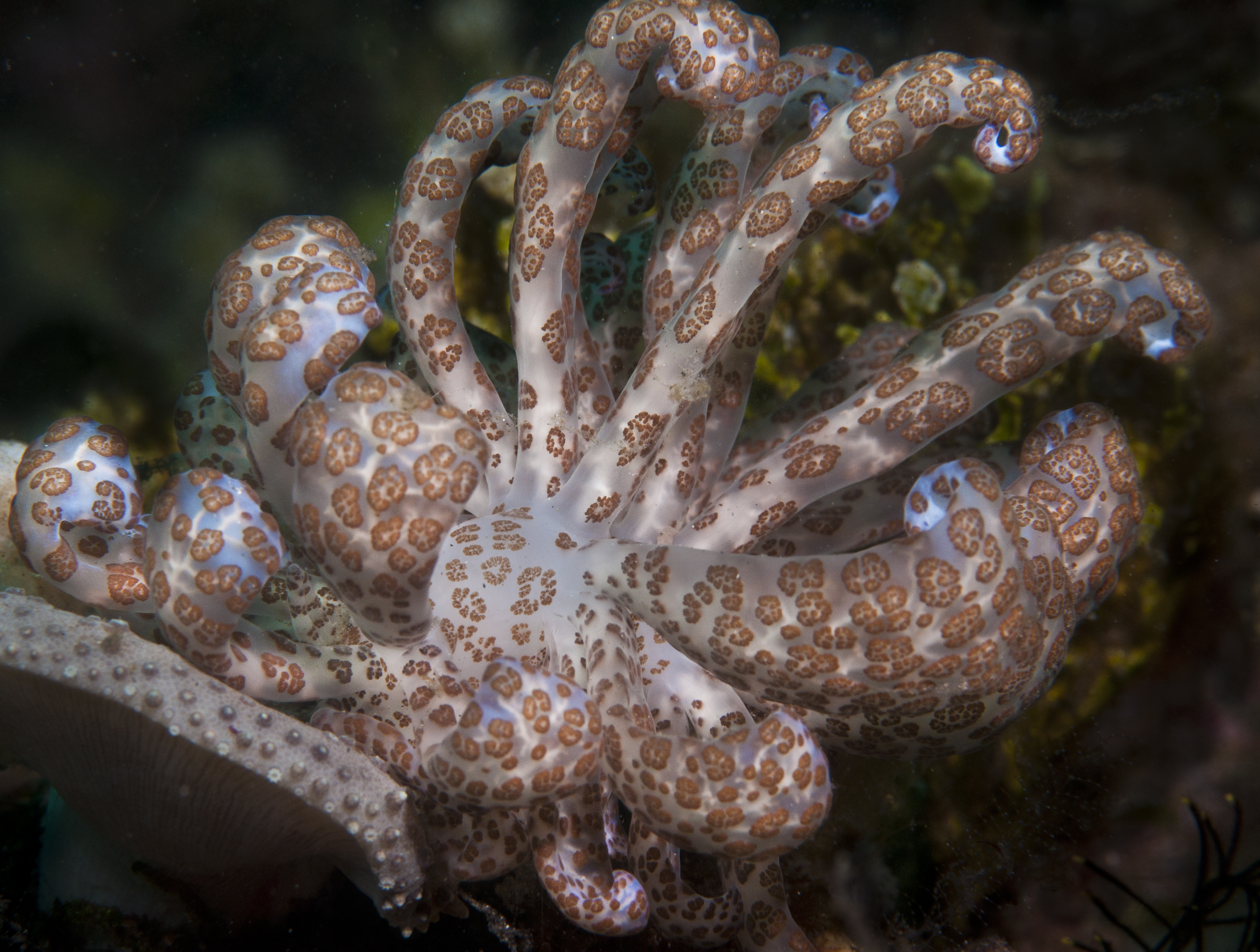
A closeup of the nudibranch, showing the clusters of zooxanthellae

== Ecology ==
Phyllodesmium longicirrum feeds on soft coral Sarcophyton trocheliophorum (family Alcyoniidae).
