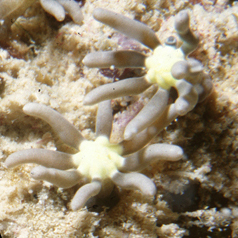

Scientific classification
- Kingdom: Animalia
- Phylum: Cnidaria
- Subphylum: Anthozoa
- Class: Octocorallia
- Order: Scleralcyonacea
- Family: Briareidae
- Genus: Briareum
- Species: B. violaceum

Binomial name
- Briareum violaceum (Quoy & Gaimard, 1833)

= Briareum violaceum =

Species of coral

Briareum violaceum, commonly called star polyp, is a species of a soft coral in the family Briareidae.

== See also ==
- Phyllodesmium briareum
