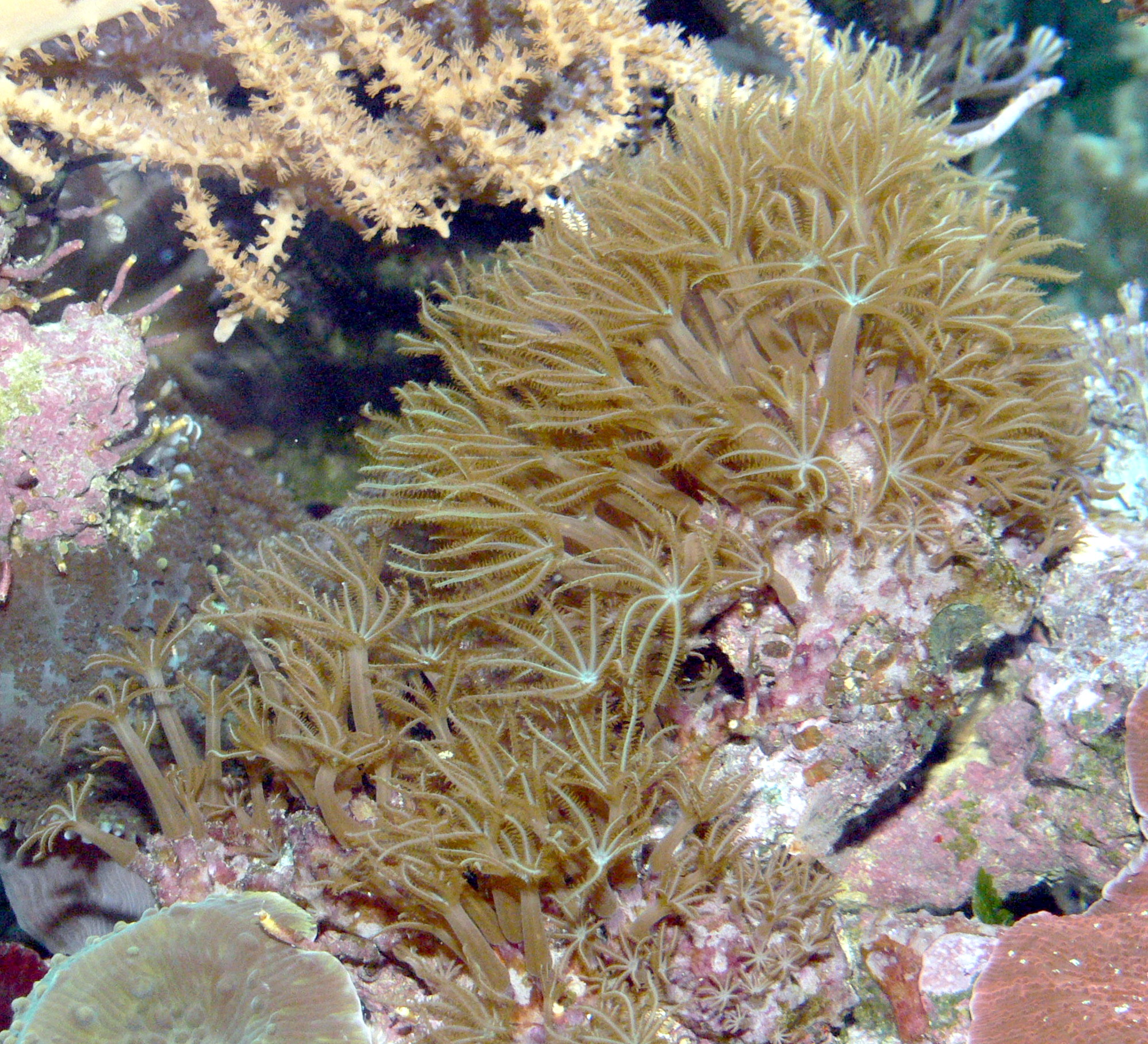
- Briareum sp.

Scientific classification
- Kingdom: Animalia
- Phylum: Cnidaria
- Subphylum: Anthozoa
- Class: Octocorallia
- Order: Alcyonacea
- Family: Briareidae
- Genus: Briareum; Blainville, 1834

Synonyms
- Solenopodium

= Briareum =

Genus of corals

Briareum is a genus of soft corals in the family Briareidae. The coral is cultivated by aquarium owners (under the common name "green star polyp" or GSP) for its fluorescing polyps, which reveal themselves under actinic light. The genus is in need of extensive examination, as many specimens sold by marketers display unique and similar characteristics, but are often labeled as one species, Pachyclavularia violacea.

== Species ==
The following species are recognized within the genus:

- Briareum asbestinum (Pallas, 1766)
- Briareum contortum (Kükenthal, 1906)
- Briareum cylindrum Samimi-Namin & van Ofwegen, 2016
- Briareum hamrum (Gohar, 1948)
- Briareum palmachristi Duchassaing & Michelotti, 1860
- Briareum stechei (Kükenthal, 1908)
- Briareum violaceum (Quoy & Gaimard, 1833)
