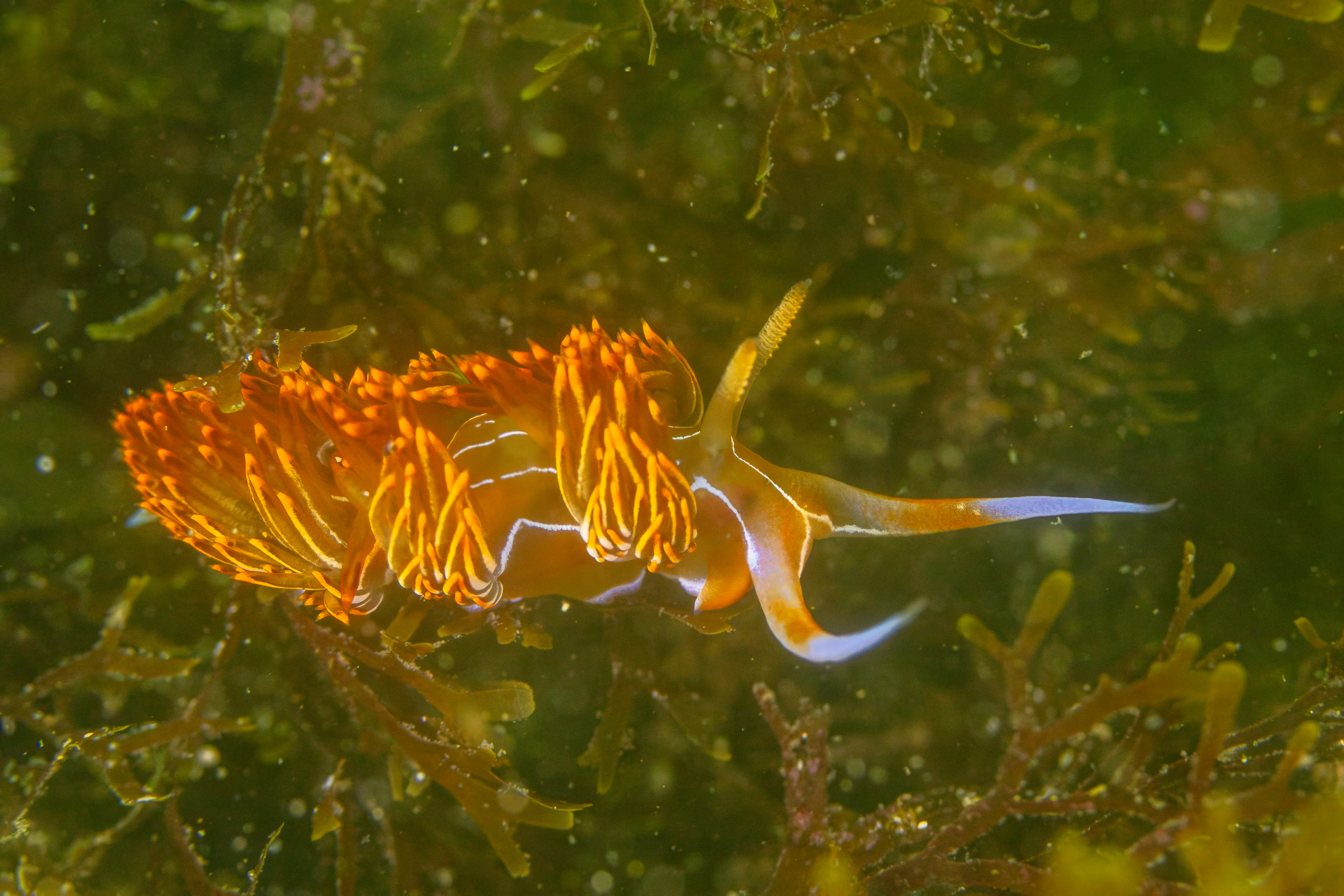
- A live individual of Nemesignis banyulensis, in situ on the Mediterranean coast of Spain, 2005

Scientific classification
- Kingdom: Animalia
- Phylum: Mollusca
- Class: Gastropoda
- Order: Nudibranchia
- Suborder: Aeolidacea
- Family: Myrrhinidae
- Genus: Nemesignis; Furfaro & Mariottini, 2021
- Species: N. banyulensis

Binomial name
- Nemesignis banyulensis (Portmann & Sandmeier, 1960)

Synonyms
- Nemesis Furfaro & Mariottini, 2021; Dondice banyulensis Portmann & Sandmeier, 1960; Dondice nicolae Vicente, 1967; Godiva banyulensis (Portmann & Sandmeier, 1960)

= Nemesignis =

Genus of gastropods

Nemesignis is a genus of sea slugs, aeolid nudibranchs, marine gastropod mollusks in the family Myrrhinidae with only one species, Nemesignis banyulensis.

== Naming ==
The genus was originally named Nemesis by Furfaro & Mariottini in 2021, but being a junior homonym of the crustacean Nemesis, named in 1826 by Risso, the genus name of the nudibranch was replaced with Nemesignis.

== Distribution ==
This species is found in the Mediterranean Sea and adjacent Atlantic Ocean.
