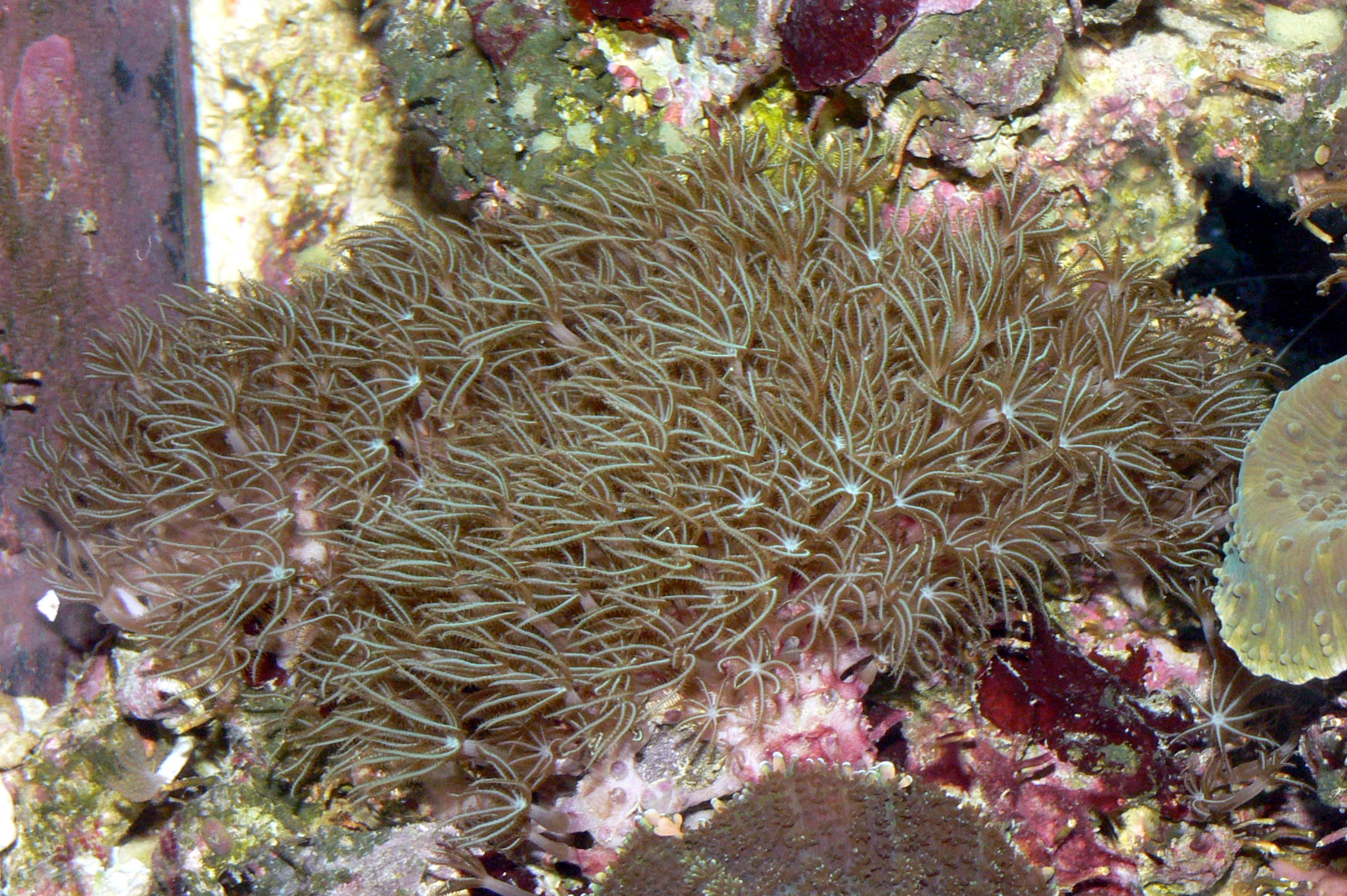
- Briareum sp.

Scientific classification
- Kingdom: Animalia
- Phylum: Cnidaria
- Subphylum: Anthozoa
- Class: Octocorallia
- Order: Scleralcyonacea
- Family: Briareidae; Gray, 1859

Genera
- see text

= Briareidae =

Family of corals

Briareidae is a family of corals, a member of the phylum Cnidaria.

== Genera ==
Genera in this family include:

- Briareum Blainville, 1834
- Lignopsis Perez & Zamponi, 2000
- Pseudosuberia Kükenthal, 1919
