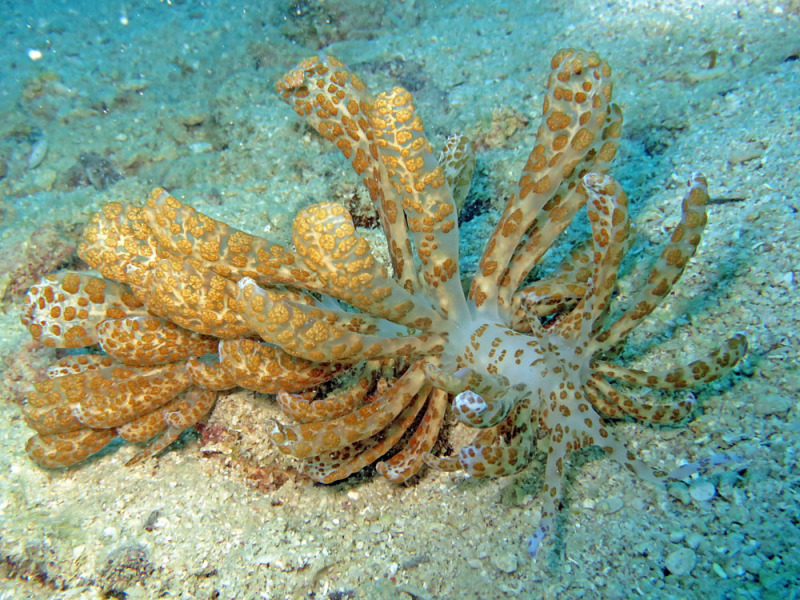
- Phyllodesmium longicirrum

Scientific classification
- Kingdom: Animalia
- Phylum: Mollusca
- Class: Gastropoda
- Order: Nudibranchia
- Suborder: Aeolidacea
- Superfamily: Aeolidioidea
- Family: Myrrhinidae; Bergh, 1905

Genera
- See Taxonomy

= Myrrhinidae =

Family of gastropods

The Myrrhinidae is a family of aeolid nudibranchs. They are marine gastropod molluscs.

== Taxonomy ==
DNA studies found the Facelinidae to be polyphyletic and this family was brought back into use to partially resolve that situation.

According to Korshunova and colleagues (2025), the following genera are recognised in the family Myrrhinidae:

- Dondice Er. Marcus, 1958
- Godiva Macnae, 1954
- Hermissenda Bergh, 1879
- Nanuca Er. Marcus, 1957
- Nemesignis Furfaro & Mariottini, 2021
- Phyllodesmium Ehrenberg, 1831

Synonyms:

- Nemesis Furfaro & Mariottini, 2021: synonym of Nemesignis Furfaro & Mariottini, 2021
