= Reflec Beat Volzza =

2015 video game

- Developer(s): Konami
- Publisher(s): Konami
- Series: Reflec Beat, Bemani
- Platform(s): Arcade
- Release: October 28, 2015
- Genre(s): Music

Reflec Beat Volzza (stylized as REFLEC BEAT VOLZZA) is the fifth installment of the touch-screen based music video game, Reflec Beat series. It was announced on August 26, 2015 as the sequel of Reflec Beat Groovin'!! with location testing period beginning from August 28 to 30, 2015. It was released on October 28, 2015.

== Gameplay ==
As with previous games, Reflec Beat Volzza employs an air-hockey play style in which players have to touch incoming objects, reflecting and bouncing them left and right to the opposite side. Different types of objects may appear, including the normal ones, objects that require players to hold them, and objects that move up and down instead of left and right. Higher difficulties also employ additional markers above the reflecting line where objects disappear when touched, instead of reflecting back. A new type of object, the Slide Object, requires players to touch and slide them, instead of merely touching or holding them.

Reflec Beat Volzza increases the difficulty scale from 10+ to 13 (12 prior from January 30, 2016); songs that previously employ a 10+ difficulty rating are all re-rated to 11 or 12. The maximum difficulty available for each round of a playthrough is also changed to 7 for Round 1, 9 for Round 2, and 12 for Final Round (as opposed to 8 for Round 1, 10 for Round 2, and 10+ for Final Round used in previous games).

== Music ==
=== Reflec Beat Volzza ===
Artist	Song	Other Information
Licenses
SOUND HOLIC feat. Nana Takahashi	FUTURE FLIGHT	
maras k/marasy×kors k	Piano Ninja	
cosMo@暴走P	∞=Inftrumental=	
じーざす (ワンダフル☆オポチュニティ！) feat. kradness	無頼ック自己ライザー (Buraikku Jikorizer)	
ARM+夕野ヨシミ feat.miko	チルノのパーフェクトさんすう教室 (Cirno no Perfect Sansū Kyōshitsu)	
C-CLAYS	幻想郷の夏祭り (Gensōkyō no Natsumatsuri)	
豚乙女	花 (Hana)	
ビートまりおと小林幸子	Help me, ERINNNNNN!! 小林幸子さん ver.「くーくり博麗お祭りえーりん！」 (Help me, ERINNNNNN!! Kobayashi Sachiko-san Ver. "COOL&CREATE Hakurei Omatsuri Erin!")	Added on December 28, 2015
Neru feat.いかさん	ハウトゥー世界征服 (How to Sekai Seifuku)	
UNISON SQUARE GARDEN	シュガーソングとビターステップ (Sugar Song to Bitter Step)	
Neru	東京テディベア (Tokyo Teddy Bear)	
n-buna	ウミユリ海底譚 (Umiyuri Kaiteitan)	
ゲスの極み乙女。	私以外私じゃないの (Watashi Igai Watashi Janai no)	
A応P	全力バタンキュー (Zenryoku Batankyu)	Added on February 17, 2016
Default Konami Originals
Sota F.	Follow the path	
日向美ビタースイーツ♪	地方創生☆チクワクティクス (Chihō Sōsei☆Chikuwatics)	from HinaBitter♪ Added on November 26, 2015
Xceon feat. Mayumi Morinaga	幻影ノ消失 (Genei no Shōshitsu)	
日向美ビタースイーツ♪	フラッター現象の顛末と単一指向性の感情論 (Flutter Genshō no Tenmatsu to Tanitsu Shikousei no Kanjōron)	from HinaBitter♪ Added on December 17, 2015
松下feat.Sota & wac	きゅん×きゅんばっきゅん☆LOVE (Kyun×Kyun Bakkyun☆Love)	Added on February 17, 2016
日向美ビタースイーツ♪	漆黒のスペシャルプリンセスサンデー (Shikkoku no Special Princess Sundae)	from HinaBitter♪ Added on October 29, 2015
劇団レコード feat.Mille Face	ヴェニスの慕情 (Venice no Bōjō)	
Extra Round song
HEXA	CODE:1	
HEXA	CODE:2	
Conditional Unlocks
remixed by DJ TOTTO	The 5th KAC DJ TOTTO's SELECTION	
Ultimate Survival
かめりあ feat.ななひら&謎の黒猫神 W	神よ、ニャンコを与えたまえ! (Kamiyo, Nyanko wo Ataetamae!)	
RoughSketch	Raving Fantasy	
Hommarju	Crazy Jackpot	
PHQUASE	アイリス (Iris)	
P*Light	Storm Buster	
OSTER project	DixieLand a la mode	
kobaryo	SEITEN NO TERIYAKI	
DJ Myosuke	I Am No One	
源屋 feat.Kuroa*	MOON DUST	
DJ Noriken	F/E/D/R(I Don't Care)	
USAO	Hastur	
DJ Genki feat. yukacco With Gt 三代	Get Future	
Reflec Derby
MAX MAMIMIZER VS DJ TOTTO	Rebellio	
Hinatabi Chikuwa-Hime Ketteisen
日向美ビタースイーツ♪	ぽかぽかレトロード (Pokapoka Retroad)	from HinaBitter♪
日向美ビタースイーツ♪	完全無欠の無重力ダイブ (Kanzen Muketsu No Mujuūryoku Dive)	from HinaBitter♪
日向美ビタースイーツ♪	エキサイティング！！も・ちゃ・ちゃ☆ (Exciting!! Mo・Cha・Cha☆)	from HinaBitter♪
日向美ビタースイーツ♪	とびっきりのふわっふわ (Tobikkiri No Fuwaffuwa)	from HinaBitter♪
日向美ビタースイーツ♪	3 A.M. ディテクティブ・ゲーム (3 A.M. Detective Game)	from HinaBitter♪
Floor Infection
cosMo@暴走P	For UltraPlayers	from Sound Voltex II -infinite infection-
Pastel-kun no Gakkī Hakase no Dokidoki Rhythm Kenkyujō
First Phase
猫叉Master	Journey	
SOUND HOLIC feat. Nana Takahashi	JUST AFTER DARK -零- (JUST AFTER DARK -Zero-)	
U1 vs U1 overground	私をディスコにつれてって TOKYO (Watashi wo Disco ni Tsuretette)	
Ryu*	雪月夜 (Yukizukiyo)	First Phase End
Second Phase
kors k REASM Des-ROW	Erosion Mark	From Pop'n Music Rhythmin
ヒゲドライバー with 高橋瞳	God bless you	
Mutsuhiko Izumi	FIRE 2	
ビートまりお(COOL&CREATE)	リフレクラジカル (Reflec Radical)	
onoken	Viden	Second Phase End
Third Phase
Asaki	NIRVANA	
Akhuta	Palma Lunae	
DJ Command	True Blue [DJ Command Mix]	
Des-ROW・組	斬刀鬼 (Zantōki)	
L.E.D.	THE LYCANTHROPHE	Third Phase End
Fourth Phase
96	Ghost Hunters	
DJ NAGAI	Jungle Jungle	
kors k	Sapphire	
ARM×狐夢想 feat. 桃箱	いただき! 桃色ゾンビにあん (Itadaki! Momoiro Zombie Nian)	
DJ TOTTO	Crystallia	Fourth Phase End
Fifth Phase
Des-ROW vibes Dr.Honda	SERVI	
cosMo@暴走P feat.96	XiNX	
dj TAKA	RAIN	Fifth Phase End

=== Reflec Beat Volzza 2 ===
Artist	Song	Other Information
Licenses
Sekai no Owari	ANTI-HERO	
T.M.Revolution×水樹奈々	Preserved Roses	
AAA	アシタノヒカリ (Ashita no Hikari)	
Kana-Boon	ダイバー (Diver)	
学園生活部	ふ・れ・ん・ど・し・た・い (Friendshita)	
Babymetal	ギミチョコ!! (Gimme Choco!!)	
筋肉少女帯	混ぜるな危険 (Mazeruna Kiken)	
CHICO with HoneyWorks	プライド革命 (Pride Kakumei)	
ROOKiEZ is PUNK'D	リクライム (Reclimb)	
月龍	MOON LIGHT	from Ryu☆ album "Ryu☆BEST -MOONLiGHT-"
Added Licensed Songs
kors k feat. kradness remixed by Camellia	Brightness(Camellia's 'Vividness' Remix)	Added on April 28, 2016 from Quarks album "Dualive"
Quarks(kradness×Camellia)	Dualive	Added on April 28, 2016 from Quarks album "Dualive"
Ryu* feat. kradness remixed by Camellia	Infinity Rise(Camellia's 'Inf+1' Remix)	Added on April 28, 2016 from Quarks album "Dualive"
Quarks(kradness×Camellia)	You and me	Added on April 28, 2016 from Quarks album "Dualive"
VENUS	Help me, ERINNNNNN!! -VENUS mix-	Added on July 28, 2016 from Sound Voltex III -Gravity Wars-
fourfolium	Now Loading!!!!	Added on August 4, 2016; New Game! ending theme
fourfolium	SAKURAスキップ (SAKURA Skip)	Added on August 4, 2016; New Game! opening theme
Default Konami Originals
コスモドライバー join. shully & Nimo	Black or Red?	
ゆよゆっぱ	Dreaming	
Sota Fujimori 3rd Season	EXOTICA	
阿部靖広 feat.ひうらまさこ	Like a nameless flower	
Power Of Nature	ORIENTAL MESIA	
DJ TOTTO feat. えなこ	Precious ☆ Star	
dj TAKA feat. VENUS	SAMBA de 恋心 (SAMBA de Koigokoro)	
Qrispy Joybox	Winter Gift ～クリスピーからの贈りもの～ (Winter Gift ~Qrispy Karano Okurimono~)	
あさき×剣	透明はまだらに世界を告げて (Tōmei Wa Madarani Sekai Wo Tsugete)	GITADORA Tri-Boost x REFLEC BEAT VOLZZA 2
Added Konami Original Songs
日向美ビタースイーツ♪＆ひなちくん	倉野川音頭 (Kuranogawa Ondo)	Added on August 5, 2016 from Hinabitter♪
kradness	零の位相 (Rei no Isō)	Added on August 25, 2016 from kradness's album "Mind Hack"
Conditional Unlocks
上ノ瀬つかさ	ruin of opals	
ACRID-9	Pleasure with VOLZZA	System BGM (VOLZZA)
成城猿楽団	加油! 元気猿! (Jiayou! Genkizaru!)	from pop'n music 7
kors k	Monkey Business	from Dance Dance Revolution 2013
Extra Round Songs
RoughSketch REVET D-crew	Disable Mark	
Hinatabi Chikuwa-Hime Ketteisen
日向美ビタースイーツ♪	黒髪乱れし修羅となりて ～凛edition～ (Kurokami Midareshi Shura to Narite ～Rin edition)	from HinaBitter♪
Otegaru!LINK TRACK
DJ TOTTO	少女アリスと箱庭幻想コンチェルト (Shōjo Alice to Hakoniwa Gensō Concerto)	from Beatmania IIDX 23: Copula
DJ Scratch & Bend	Blue Spring Express	from Beatmania IIDX 23: Copula
雷龍	ra'am	from Beatmania IIDX 21: Spada
DJ SHARPNEL feat.みらい	めいさいアイドル☆あいむちゃん♪ (Meisai Idol Aimu-chan)	from Beatmania IIDX 23: Copula
Code Breaking Returns
あさきのくりむ童話	去る金合戦 (Saru Kanegassen)	from GITADORA
HEXA	CODE:1 [revision 0.9.8]	
三代目 ADULTIC TEACHERS	Mathematical Love	System BGM (VOLZZA 2)
Pastel challenge!
土岐麻子	Little Prayer	from GuitarFreaks / DrumMania V
good-cool feat. すわひでお	H@ppy Choice	from pop'n music 6
ASMAT & emi	O JIYA	from GUITARFREAKS 7thMIX & drummania 6thMIX
Des-ROW・組スペシアルr	在るが儘に (Aruga Mamani)	
Kevin Vecchione	under control	from GUITARFREAKS 7thMIX & drummania 6thMIX
常盤ゆう	カモミール・バスルーム (Camomile Bathroom)	from pop'n music 7
TAG	El Dorado	from GuitarFreaks / DrumMania V3
HuΣeR	Crafty Savior	
SOUND HOLIC Vs. VENUS feat. Nana Takahashi	無双 (Musō)	from Sound Voltex III -Gravity Wars
Qrispy Joybox feat.VENUS	魔法の言葉 (Mahó no Kotoba)	
ヒゲドライバー feat.ヒゲドライVAN	スカイダイバー (Sky Diver)	from BeatStream AniTribe
96 feat.すわひでお	怒りと共に去りぬ！！ (Ikari to Tomoni Sarinu!!)	from pop'n music éclale
豚乙女	カケラ (Kakera)	from GITADORA Tri-Boost
rino & m@sumi from plastic penguin	リメンバーリメンバー (Remember Remember)	from pop'n music Sunny Park
TOMOSUKE feat. Three Berry Icecream	jet coaster☆girl	from GuitarFreaks 7thMix/DrumMania 6thMix
TOMOSUKE feat. Shiho Rainbow	We need love	
BEMANI Bi-Ra Factory
私立BEMANI学園軽音部 OB	Good bye, Summer～さよならは言わない～ (Good bye, Summer~Sayonara No Iwanai~)	
Ultimate Survival: Final Punishment Song
元祖ボーイズ男子ボーイズ	X-TREME 6	
