= Ixion (disambiguation) =

Ixion is a king punished by the gods in Greek mythology.

Ixion may also refer to:

== Music ==
- Ixion, a 1699 opera by Nicolaus Adam Strungk
- Ixion, the subtitle of Rued Langgaard's Symphony No. 11
- "Ixion", a 1986 single by Blyth Power
- "Ixion", a song by L.E.D. used in Beatmania IIDX 22: Pendual
- "Ixion", a 2008 song by Misanthrope from IrremeDIABLE

== Vehicles ==
- Ford Ixion or Mazda Premacy, a minivan
- Ixion, a steam locomotive in the South Devon Railway Comet class
- Ixion, a preserved British Rail Class 46 diesel locomotive

== Video games ==
- Ixion (2022 video game), a management game by Bulwark Studios
- Ixion, a fictional train in Dark Chronicle
- Ixion, a fictional jet from Raiden Fighters Jet
- Ixion, a fictional summonable Aeon from Final Fantasy X
- Ixion, a fictional boss in Returnal (video game)

== Other uses ==
- 28978 Ixion, a minor planet in the Solar System
- Ixion (coral), a junior synonym for Ezziona, a genus of soft corals
- Ixion (Ribera), a 1632 painting by Jusepe de Ribera
- Basil H. Davies or Ixion (1879–1961), clergyman who wrote for The Motor Cycle
- Ixion, or the Man at the Wheel, an 1863 burlesque by F. C. Burnand
- Ixion, a 1952 poetry collection by Shake Keane
- Ixion, a project by NanoRacks to turn spent rocket tanks into habitable living area
