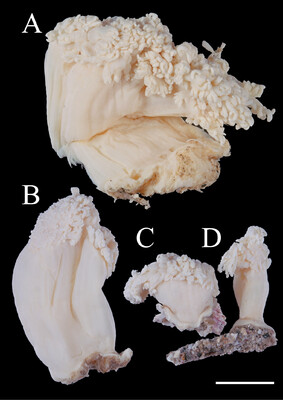
- Holotype and paratypes of Xenia konohana

Scientific classification
- Kingdom: Animalia
- Phylum: Cnidaria
- Subphylum: Anthozoa
- Class: Octocorallia
- Order: Malacalcyonacea
- Family: Xeniidae
- Genus: Xenia
- Species: X. konohana

Binomial name
- Xenia konohana Koido, Imahara & Fukami, 2022

= Xenia konohana =

Species of coral

Xenia konohana is a species of soft coral in the family Xeniidae found in Japan. It was described by Tatsuki Koido, Yukimitsu Imahara, and Hironobu Fukami in 2022.

== Description ==
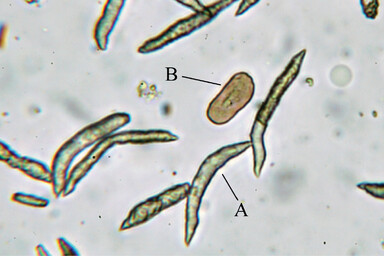
Spindle sclerites (A) and ellipsoid sclerites (B) found in Xenia konohana

Xenia konohana is distinguished from other members of its genus by its combination of ellipsoid sclerites (found in many other members of Xenia) alongside rod-shaped "spindle" sclerites unique to the species. The species was named after Konohanasakuya-hime, a Japanese kami whose shrine is in Miyazaki Prefecture.

== Distribution ==
The species is found around Ōshima, an island off the coast of Nichinan, Miyazaki Prefecture, at depths between 5 and 10 meters.
