= Xenia elongata =

Scientific classification
- Kingdom: Animalia
- Phylum: Cnidaria
- Subphylum: Anthozoa
- Class: Octocorallia
- Order: Malacalcyonacea
- Family: Xeniidae
- Genus: Xenia
- Species: X. elongata

Binomial name
- Xenia elongata Dana, 1846

Species of coral

Xenia elongata is a species of soft coral in the family Xeniidae. It was described by James Dwight Dana in 1846.
