= Beatmania IIDX 21: Spada =

2013 video game

- Developer: Konami
- Publisher: Konami
- Series: Beatmania IIDX, Bemani
- Platform: Arcade
- Release: November 13, 2013
- Genre: Music
- Modes: Single-player & Multiplayer
- Arcade system: Konami Bemani PC (E4690)

Beatmania IIDX 21: Spada (stylized as beatmaniaIIDX 21 SPADA) is a music video game and the 21st installment of Beatmania IIDX series of video games. The main motif of the game revolves around swords, as the title of the game, Spada is Italian for sword. The UI has a medieval fantasy theme and mainly features black, brown, and red colors. It was first announced on June 12, 2013. Location tests began in Akihabara on June 14, 2013 and ended on June 16, 2013. It was released on November 13, 2013.

== Gameplay ==
For more information about the gameplay of Beatmania IIDX in general, please refer to Beatmania IIDX#Gameplay.

Beatmania IIDX tasks the player with performing songs through a controller consisting of seven key buttons and a scratchable turntable. Hitting the notes with strong timing increases the score and groove gauge bar, allowing the player to finish the stage. Failing to do so depletes the gauge until it is empty, abruptly ending the song.

Beatmania IIDX 21: Spada still retains the same basic gameplay since the start of the series. Players are required to hit notes that fall from the top of the screen at the hit zone using keys or turntables which are required to be scratched. Hitting the notes correctly will fill up the Groove Meter, while failure to do so drains it. Players must attain at least 80% of the meter at the end of the song to pass. Two gameplay variations introduced in Beatmania IIDX 17: Sirius: Charge Note (notes required to be held) and Backspin Scratch (spin the turntable at one direction and spin it at the opposite direction at the end) are once again present. Players can now freely change between Single and Double Play during song select screen. The Results Screen has also been overhauled. The keypad used for inputting e-Amusement code can now be used to sort difficulty and music folders in-game.

== Unlocking system ==
=== Spada†leggendaria ===
In this game, players can still access the normal Extra Stage with the same requirements from previous games; similar to Beatmania IIDX 20: Tricoro's Limit Burst Unlocking System, new boss songs were added to the new system called "Spada†leggendaria". In addition to fulfilling the normal Extra Stages, the player must play a specific set of songs (all are in Final Stage) to obtain new boss songs. These boss songs are exclusive to this version and the authors of the songs are based on the name of the Swords. As with Limit Burst, there is no One More Extra Stage. The songs are:

- Close the World feat. a☆ru (Final Stage for that song must be related to Swords, Crosses or Knights)
- Sigmund (Final Stage for that song must be composed by DJ Genki)
- Ancient Scapes (Final Stage for that song must be composed by DJ Noriken)
- invoker (Final Stage for that song must be composed by USAO)
- Feel The Beat (Final Stage for that song must be composed by DJ Shimamura)
- 疾風迅雷 (Final Stage for that song must be composed by OSTER Project)
- Verflucht (Final Stage for that song must be composed by Hommarju)

Similar to Limit Burst, the player can only access the Another chart of the song initially; the Normal and Hyper charts are added through the period of two weeks after the song was released as the next Spada†leggendaria song was added on the first weekday of the month (until July).

Starting on April 23, 2014, Players playing via Paseli (Which was also the only way to access Extra Stages after the change for the Japanese arcades) can also access the alternate version of the previous Spada†leggendaria songs by spending six V-Disks (or three if both players were playing) out of seven given at the start under the Leggendaria folder. Those alternate versions of the songs are generally the same as the first (songs with "†leggendaria" simply added in their title), except that it has difficult Another charts (since HEROIC VERSE, Leggendaria charts have their own difficulty).

Upon the release of PENDUAL on September 17, 2014, all the songs (including Leggendaria Charts) would still be locked and can only be accessed on Extra Stage via Paseli on the Leggendaria folder.

=== Qprogue ===
Qprogue is the first unlockable event of the game (based on a Role-Playing Game) which started on December 25, 2013. In this event players can control their avatar (or Kupuro) through the map by using the game keyboard or the numerical buttons upon every credit of gameplay. While players can defeat monsters by reducing the enemies' HP (reducing the player's stamina in the process), the avatar will level up (up to 28) as well as unlock more charts, items, weapons and skills (can be toggled by pressing the Effect Button) thus giving the player the advantage against certain enemies. In order to progress to the next phrase's map, the player must have unlocked the Another Chart of the boss song of this Chapter before the player can move on (the player can revisit the maps by visiting the portals. For QProgueDX, it can be toggled using the Vefx Button). Some songs are also locked in forts and players must play the required note charts of certain songs under forced difficulty (depending on the level chosen in each playthrough) to unlock them.

After April 30, 2014, the 4th map, QProgue DX, is made mandatory to play for all players. Players who did not unlock the songs after this date may unlock this new map. If all the charts has been unlocked and all enemies were defeated, the player has completed the event and all the accessories can be used for regular gameplay.

There are four maps in this event and 25 songs have to be unlocked for regular play. The event ended on September 17, 2014, which unlocks all the songs automatically.

=== Super Star Mitsuru Revival Event ===
Super Star Mitsuru Revival Event was started on March 26, 2014. Through this event, the player can unlock eight customisation designs and shop items (billed as "Only One" items) by fulfilling the in-game conditions which relate to the wordplay number 326 in the first three stages of gameplay (similar to Legend Cross from IIDX Tricoro). Every time the condition is fulfilled (such as getting 326 on the note counts or BPM Total, or play songs that relate or come from the numbers 3, 2 and 6), new items will be made available in the Shop (but it is not mandatory to purchase them in the case of unlocking the song). If at least four criteria were fulfilled and have at least four customisation items available for purchase, Smug Face -どうだ, オレの生き様は- (Only One Edition) will be unlocked automatically for regular gameplay. Unlocking all the eight customization items in the shop will also unlock I will be back -オレは帰ってきた-.

Like QProgue, the event ended on September 17, 2014, which automatically unlocks the two songs (some of the accessories and customization items were discounted).

== Music ==
Currently, there are 90 new songs. While 21 songs from the older versions were removed, the remaining songs have returned for a total of 846 songs available in this game, although some songs must be unlocked by fulfilling requirements in-game.

Song names in parentheses represent the direct translation of Japanese titles. Song names in bold represent the official in-game translation through the arcade machine's LED marquee.

Song	Artist	Genre	Tier
New Regular Songs
Adularia	DJ TOTTO	Artcore	
ALBA -黎明- (ALBA -Reimei-)	SOUND HOLIC feat. Nana Takahashi	Hyper Gothic Beat	
Atröpøs	sasakure.UK	Neutronica	
Critical Crystal	青龍	Dance Speed	
DARK LEGACY	BaSTeT	Dark Element	
Devilz Sacrifice -贖罪の羊- (Devilz Sacrifice -Shokuzai no Hitsuji-) (**Devilz Sacrifice -Scapegoat-**)	OSTER project	Symphonic Break Beats	
diagram	Expander	Glitch Hop	
Elektrick U-Phoria	DJ Noriken	UK Hardcore	
Element of SPADA	猫叉Master feat. 霜月はるか	Healing Pop	
esrev:eR	TAG meets "eimy"	Emotional Sentence	
EXTREME MACH COLLIDER	L.E.D.	Techno	
Funny Shuffle	猫叉Master+	Jag Glitch	
Give Me Your Love	星野奏子	Kana-Pop	
Insane Techniques	kors k	Hi-Tech Full On	
INSOMNIA	ジャカルタファンクブラザーズ	Funkot	
LA FESTA LA VITA!!	GUHROOVY	Drum'n'Bass	
Lighting Shower	TAG	Trance Pop	
m1dy Deluxe	m1dy	Tokyo Style Speedcore	
MAD ATTACK	HALFBY	Upbeat	
MAGIC & LOVE	DJ Genki feat. yukacco	Happy Core	
Miracle 5ympho X	USAO	Frenchcore	
NPC World	PON	Electro Pop	
Odin	Noizenecio	Gabber	
Overload Frontier	DJ Shimamura	Hardcore Rave	
rainbow guitar weeps	dj TAKA	Brightness	
RISE	Dirty Androids	Drumstep	
Valgus	DJ Myosuke feat. yukacco	Mainstream Hardcore	
WOBBLE IMPACT	Sota Fujimori	Dubstep	
Wonder Girl feat. Kanae Asada	Y&Co.	Eurobeat	
牧神笛吹きて (Bokushin Fuefukite) (**AIGIPAN**)	楽士ゾディアック	Zodiac Oracle X	
超!!遠距離らぶ♡メ〜ル (Chō!! Enkyori Love Ma~il)	ななひら	乙女EDM (Otome EDM)	
廿 (Nijū-ichi no mae) (**TWENTY**)	DJ TECHNORCH	新世紀進歩的羽扇子音楽 (Shinseiki Shinpoteki Haisensu Ongaku)	
旋律のドグマ ～Misérables～ (Senritsu no Dogma ~Misérables~)	楓璃夢=ジークフリード=ファイエルローゼン	Juvenile Drum'n'Bass	
罪と罰 (Tsumi to Batsu)	Xceon feat.Mayumi Morinaga	Hyper J-Pop	
Added Songs
ÆTHER (**ETHER**)	TAG Underground	Astral Hardcore	from Reflec Beat Colette.
アルストロメリア (Alstroemeria)	TAG	Bloom Fusion	from Jubeat Copious.
幻想系世界修復少女 (Gensōkei Sekai Shūfuku Shōjo)	Last Note.	J-Pop	EXIT TUNES License.
バンブーソード·ガール (Bamboo Sword Girl)	cosMo@暴走P	J-Speedmetal	EXIT TUNES License.
Idola	iconoclasm feat. GUMI	Replicant Core	GUMI 5th Anniversary party Presented by BEMANI Collaboration Song.
Super Star -MITSURU- Revival Festival
Smug Face -どうだ、オレの生き様は- (ONLY ONE EDITION) (Smug Face ~Dō Da, Ore No Iki-Sama Wa~ (ONLY ONE EDITION))	SUPER STAR 満-MITSURU-	Only One Act	Original Song from Reflec Beat. rearrangement from SUPER STAR 満-MITSURU-'s album "ONLY ONE ACT".
I will be back -オレは帰ってきた- (I will be back -Ore Wa Kaettekita-)	SUPER STAR 満-MITSURU-	Only One Moment	
Spada†Leggendaria
Close the World feat. a☆ru	天叢雲剣	J-Core	Artist named after Ama-no-Murakumo-no-Tsurugi.
Close the World feat. a☆ru†LEGGENDARIA	天叢雲剣	J-Core	Artist named after Ama-no-Murakumo-no-Tsurugi (Alternative).
Sigmund	Gram	Requiem Psy	Artist named after Gram.
Sigmund†LEGGENDARIA	Gram	Requiem Psy	Artist named after Gram (Alternative).
Ancient Scapes	Durandal	Dynastic Freeform	Artist named after Durandal.
Ancient Scapes†LEGGENDARIA	Durandal	Dynastic Freeform	Artist named after Durandal (Alternative).
invoker	Caladborg	Tribe Core	Artist named after Caladbolg.
invoker†LEGGENDARIA	Caladborg	Tribe Core	Artist named after Caladbolg (Alternative).
Feel The Beat	Falsion	Hardcore Rave	Artist named after Falsion and Falchion.
疾風迅雷 (Shippūjinrai) (**LIGHTNING SPEED**)	KUMOKIRI	Oriental Core	Artist named after Kumokiri.
Verflucht	Tyrfing	Hard NRG	Artist named after Tyrfing.
Nettō! BEMANI Stadium
Stella Sinistra	Akhuta Philharmonic Orchestra	Symphonovative Rock	Bemani Collaboration.
マインド・ゲーム (Mind Game)	96 with メカショッチョー	青春剛速球メタル (Seishun Gōsokkyū Metal)	Bemani Collaboration.
PUNISHER	TAG×PON	Variant Rave	Bemani Collaboration.
HYENA	Hommarju	Big Beat	Bemani Collaboration.
デッドボヲルdeホームラン (Deadball de Homerun) (**I Like Deadball**)	猫叉Masterβ2	Electric Manoush Swing	Bemani Collaboration.
Squeeze	VENUS feat. Mutsuhiko Izumi	Without You Night -VI- (Note: As of March 27th, 2014, the genre was changed to Without You Tonight -VI-.)	Bemani Collaboration.
野球の遊び方 そしてその歴史 ～決定版～ (Yakyū no Asobikata Soshite Sono Rekishi ~Ketteihan~) (**How To play Baseball and for its History**)	あさき大監督	野球のことがよくわかる (Yakyū no Koto ga Yoku Wakaru)	Bemani Collaboration.
轟け！恋のビーンボール！！ (Todoroke! Koi no Beanball!!) (**Thunder Love Beanball!!**)	ダイナミック野球兄弟 v.s. クロスファイヤーPrim	ベースボールヒロイン (Baseball Heroine)	Bemani Collaboration.
Engraved Mark	Ryu☆ ∞ Des-ROW	Happy Sad Core	Bemani Collaboration.
IX (**NINE**)	dj TAKA VS DJ TOTTO feat.藍 (dj TAKA VS DJ TOTTO feat. Ai)	Blood Metal	Bemani Collaboration.
Hakken! Yomigaetta BEMANI Iseki
SCHWARZSCHILD FIELD	L.E.D.	Full On	From REFLEC BEAT groovin'!!.
KAISER PHOENIX	96	Heavy Metal	From GuitarFreaks XG / Drummania XG.
海神 (Wadatsumi)	兎々	Hydro Core	From REFLEC BEAT colette.
Cleopatrysm	ピラミッ°C	Pharao Beam Step	Bemani Collaboration.
御千手メディテーション (Osenju Medidation)	昇天家族	ニューエイジ合掌コア (New Age Gasshō Core)	Bemani Collaboration.
KHAMEN BREAK	くふおー	Progressive Gospel	Bemani Collaboration.
Qprogue
Phase 1
Unicorn Tail	DJ YOSHITAKA	Breakbeats Trance	from beatmaniaIIDX 16 EMPRESS + PREMIUM BEST (JP PS2).
お願いアインシュタイン (Onegai Einstein)	中山真斗 feat. 桜川めぐ	Cyber Symphonic Pop	
Pharaoh	劇団レコード	Ancient Civilization	
ra'am	雷龍	Ravers Dance Speed	
Phase 2
NEMESIS -gratitude remix- IIDX Edition	Remixed by PHQUASE	Drum'n'Bass	
Votum stellarum -Hommarju Remix-	Remixed by Hommarju	UK Hardcore	
Dark Fall	黒龍	Massive Dance Speed	
BLUE DRAGON(雷龍RemixIIDX) (BLUE DRAGON (Rairyū Remix IIDX))	青龍	Ravers Dance Speed	
Phase 3
RIZING YOU UP	Ryu☆	Happy Hardcore	from beatmaniaIIDX 16 EMPRESS + PREMIUM BEST (JP PS2).
Hypersonik	Eagle	Drum'n Bass	
refractive index	Sota Fujimori	Psychedelic Trance	
Last Dance	dj TAKA	Hard Stacc	
Phase 4 (QProgue DX)
死神自爆中二妹アイドルももかりん(1歳) (Shinigami Jibakūchu Nimōto Idol Momokarin (1sai)) (**DEATH-DESTRUCT-CHUUNI-IMOUTO-IDLE MOMOKARIN-1YEAR OLD**) (Note: As of July 8th, 2014, the LED Marquee was changed to 'DEATH-DESTRUCT-CHUUNI-IMOUTO-IDOL MOMOKARIN-1YEAR OLD'.)	山本椛	電波Metal (Denpō Metal)	
Recollection	Noria	Pops	From beatmaniaIIDX 12 HAPPY SKY (JP PS2).
All is Wrecked	Destron	Industrial Metal	
Claiomh Solais	DJ Yoshitaka VS S.S.D.	Iluzio	From beatmaniaIIDX 15 DJ TROOPERS (JP PS2).
Shattered control	Vivian	Contemporary Breaks	
BRAINSTORM	Hardcore United Tokyo (teranoid & DJ TECHNORCH)	Trancecore meets Gabba	From beatmaniaIIDX 15 DJ TROOPERS (JP PS2).
into the battlefield	the wandering bard	Symphonic Breaks	
BRAVE OUT	nomico / DOWNFORCE	Electrance	
Immortal	DJ NAGAI	J-Core	
VOX UP	sampling masters mega vs. 青龍	Rotterdam Techno	From beatmaniaIIDX 15 DJ TROOPERS (JP PS2).
M.D.Injection	Project B-	Pieced Downbeat	
THE DETONATOR	teranoid vs. L.E.D.-G	Nu Style Gabba	From beatmaniaIIDX 14 GOLD (JP PS2).
煉獄のエルフェリア (Rengoku no Elfilia) (**ERFERIA**)	猫叉Master+	Hard Symphonic	
