= Sympodium (disambiguation) =

Sympodium may refer to:

- Sympodial branching, a pattern of branching, similar to dichotomous branching in botany
- Sympodium (coral), a genus of soft corals
- SMART Sympodium interactive pen display, a device associated with the Smart Board
