= Anthelia =

Anthelia may refer to:

- Anthelia (coral), a genus of soft coral
- Anthelia (plant), a genus of liverwort in the family Antheliaceae
- The plural of Anthelion, a rare optical phenomenon
