= Efflatounaria =

Scientific classification
- Kingdom: Animalia
- Phylum: Cnidaria
- Subphylum: Anthozoa
- Class: Octocorallia
- Order: Malacalcyonacea
- Family: Xeniidae
- Genus: Efflatounaria; Gohar, 1939

Species
- See text

Genus of corals

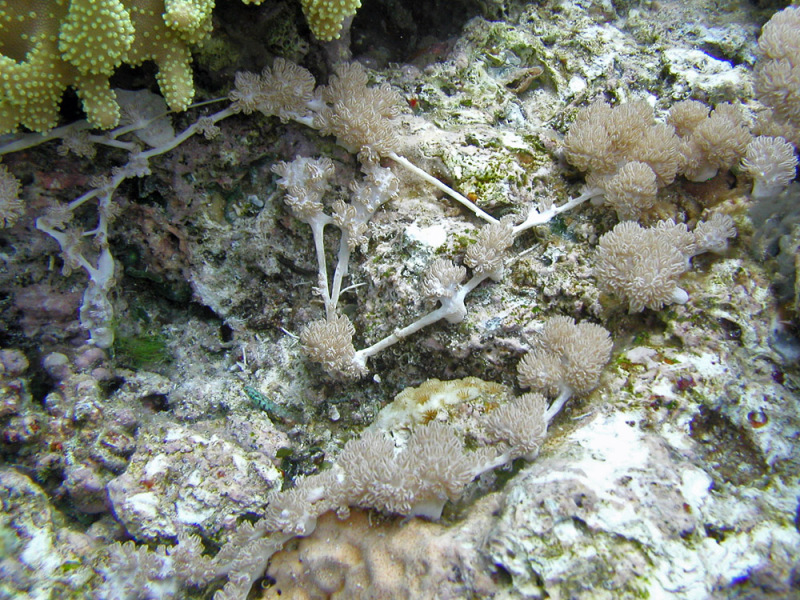
Photograph of efflatounaria

Efflatounaria is a genus of soft corals in the family Xeniidae.

== Species ==
The World Register of Marine Species lists the following species:

- Efflatounaria alba Verseveldt, 1977
- Efflatounaria nana Hickson, 1931
- Efflatounaria tottoni Gohar, 1939
