= Funginus =

Scientific classification
- Kingdom: Animalia
- Phylum: Cnidaria
- Subphylum: Anthozoa
- Class: Octocorallia
- Order: Alcyonacea
- Family: Xeniidae
- Genus: Funginus; Tixier-Durivault, 1987
- Species: F. heimi

Binomial name
- Funginus heimi Tixier-Durivault, 1970

Genus of corals

Funginus is a genus of soft corals in the family Xeniidae. It is monotypic with a single species, Funginus heimi.
