= Ingotia =

Scientific classification
- Kingdom: Animalia
- Phylum: Cnidaria
- Subphylum: Anthozoa
- Class: Octocorallia
- Order: Alcyonacea
- Family: Xeniidae
- Genus: Ingotia; Alderslade, 2001

Species
- See text

Genus of corals

Ingotia is a genus of soft corals in the family Xeniidae.

== Species ==
The World Register of Marine Species lists the following species:

- Ingotia bakusi Alderslade, 2001
- Ingotia scintillans (Thomson & Mackinnon, 1910)
- Ingotia sprungi Alderslade, 2001
