= Fasciclia =

Scientific classification
- Kingdom: Animalia
- Phylum: Cnidaria
- Subphylum: Anthozoa
- Class: Octocorallia
- Order: Alcyonacea
- Family: Xeniidae
- Genus: Fasciclia; Janes, 2008

Species
- See text

Genus of corals

Fasciclia is a genus of soft corals in the family Xeniidae.

== Species ==
The World Register of Marine Species lists the following species:

- Fasciclia lobata Janes, 2008
- Fasciclia ofwegeni Janes, 2008
