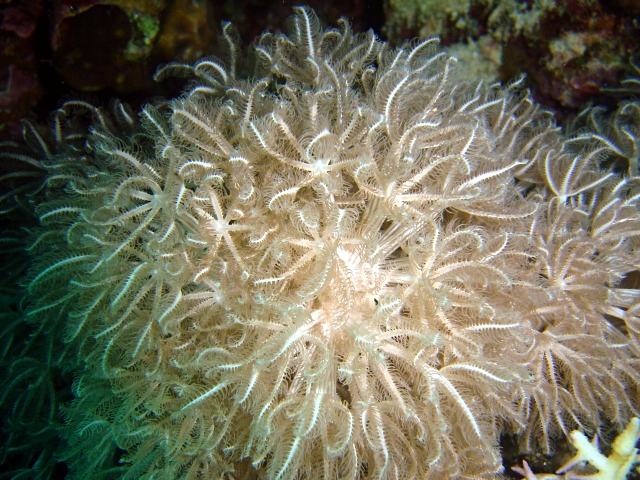

Scientific classification
- Kingdom: Animalia
- Phylum: Cnidaria
- Subphylum: Anthozoa
- Class: Octocorallia
- Order: Malacalcyonacea
- Family: Xeniidae
- Genus: Anthelia
- Species: A. glauca

Binomial name
- Anthelia glauca Lamarck, 1816

= Anthelia glauca =

Species of coral

Anthelia glauca, the giant anthelia, is a species of soft coral in the family Xeniidae. It is a colonial species and is found in shallow water in the Indo-Pacific region.

== Description ==
Anthelia glauca has large tubular polyps growing from a creeping mat that sometimes forms stolon-like fingers. The non-retractable polyps may be 11 to 25 centimetres (4 to 10 in) tall with a ring of eight slender, plume-like tentacles. The colour is usually white, pale grey, pale brown or bluish-white, and viewed from above, the polyps somewhat resemble snowflakes.

== Distribution and habitat ==
Anthelia glauca is found on reefs in the Indo-Pacific region from the Red Sea to Hawaii, growing at depths between 8 and 22 metres (26 and 72 ft). Its range includes the eastern coast of Africa and at Sodwana Bay, this coral grows on reefs formed from fossilised sand-dunes, along with a few stony corals and a diverse population of other soft corals. It is probably the most common species in its genus.

== Biology ==
Anthelia glauca is a zooxanthellate soft coral; embedded within its tissues are single-celled symbiotic dinoflagellates which provide their host with the products of photosynthesis such as organic carbon and nitrogen compounds. The polyps supplement this with the planktonic particles caught by the widely-spread tentacles. During the day the polyps sway and contract in a rhythmic fashion.

Colonies of A. glauca are either male or female. Spawning and egg transfer takes place at the full moon over a four to five month period in summer. The larvae are brooded in a unique pharyngeal pouch, an extension of the pharynx constricted on either side of the developing larvae. It has been found that the immature planula larvae acquire their zooxanthellae from symbionts present in the pharyngeal pouch by invasion through their ectodermal surface during the brooding process.
