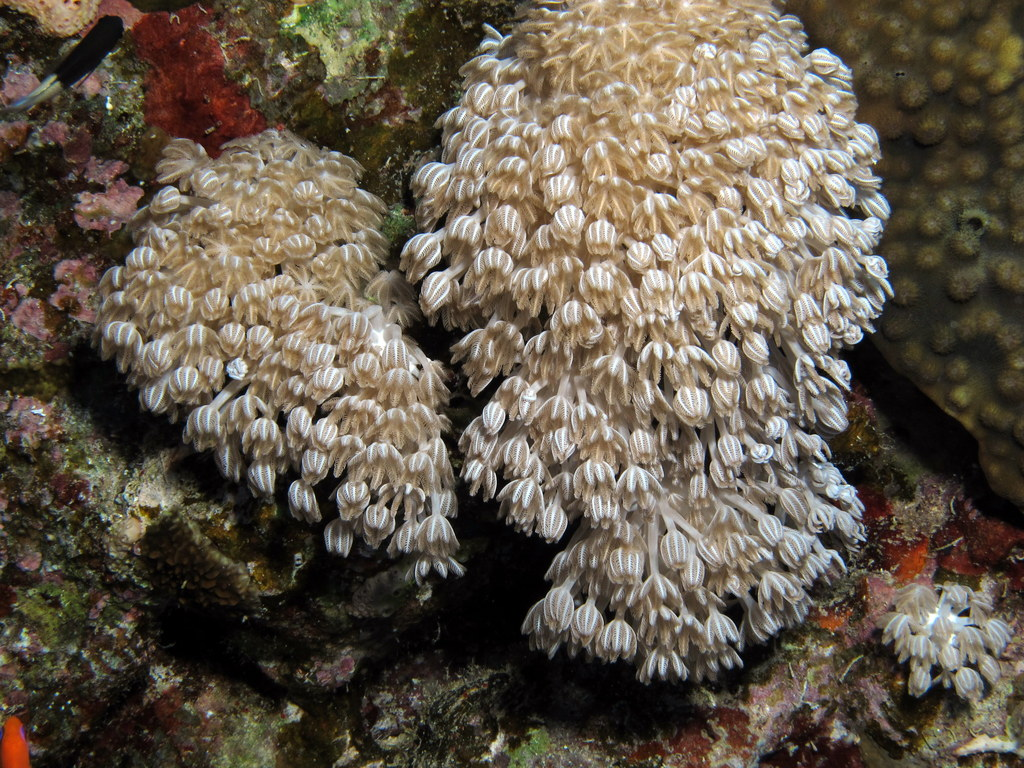
- Heteroxenia fuscescens

Scientific classification
- Kingdom: Animalia
- Phylum: Cnidaria
- Subphylum: Anthozoa
- Class: Octocorallia
- Order: Alcyonacea
- Family: Xeniidae
- Genus: Heteroxenia; Koelliker, 1874

Species
- See text

= Heteroxenia =

Genus of corals

Heteroxenia is a genus of soft corals in the family Xeniidae.

== Species ==
The World Register of Marine Species lists the following species:

- Heteroxenia bauiana May, 1900
- Heteroxenia elisabethae Kölliker, 1874
- Heteroxenia fuscescens (Ehrenberg, 1834)
- Heteroxenia ghardaquensis Gohar, 1940
- Heteroxenia lighti Roxas, 1933
- Heteroxenia medioensis Roxas, 1933
- Heteroxenia membranacea Schenk, 1896
- Heteroxenia mindorensis Roxas, 1933
- Heteroxenia minuta Roxas, 1933
- Heteroxenia palmae Roxas, 1933
- Heteroxenia philippinensis Roxas, 1933
- Heteroxenia pinnata Roxas, 1933
- Heteroxenia rigida (May, 1899)
- Heteroxenia uniserta (Kükenthal, 1902)
