= Bayerxenia =

Scientific classification
- Kingdom: Animalia
- Phylum: Cnidaria
- Subphylum: Anthozoa
- Class: Octocorallia
- Order: Alcyonacea
- Family: Xeniidae
- Genus: Bayerxenia; Alderslade, 2001
- Species: B. janesi

Binomial name
- Bayerxenia janesi Alderslade, 2001

Genus of corals

Bayerxenia is a genus of soft corals in the family Xeniidae. It is monotypic with a single species, Bayerxenia janesi
