= Sansibia =

Scientific classification
- Kingdom: Animalia
- Phylum: Cnidaria
- Subphylum: Anthozoa
- Class: Octocorallia
- Order: Alcyonacea
- Family: Xeniidae
- Genus: Sansibia; Alderslade, 2000

Species
- See text

Genus of cnidarians

Sansibia is a genus of soft corals in the family Xeniidae.

== Species ==
The World Register of Marine Species lists the following species:

- Sansibia boquetei (Roxas, 1933)
- Sansibia flava (May, 1899)
- Sansibia formosana (Utinomi, 1950)
- Sansibia lineata (Stimpson, 1855)
