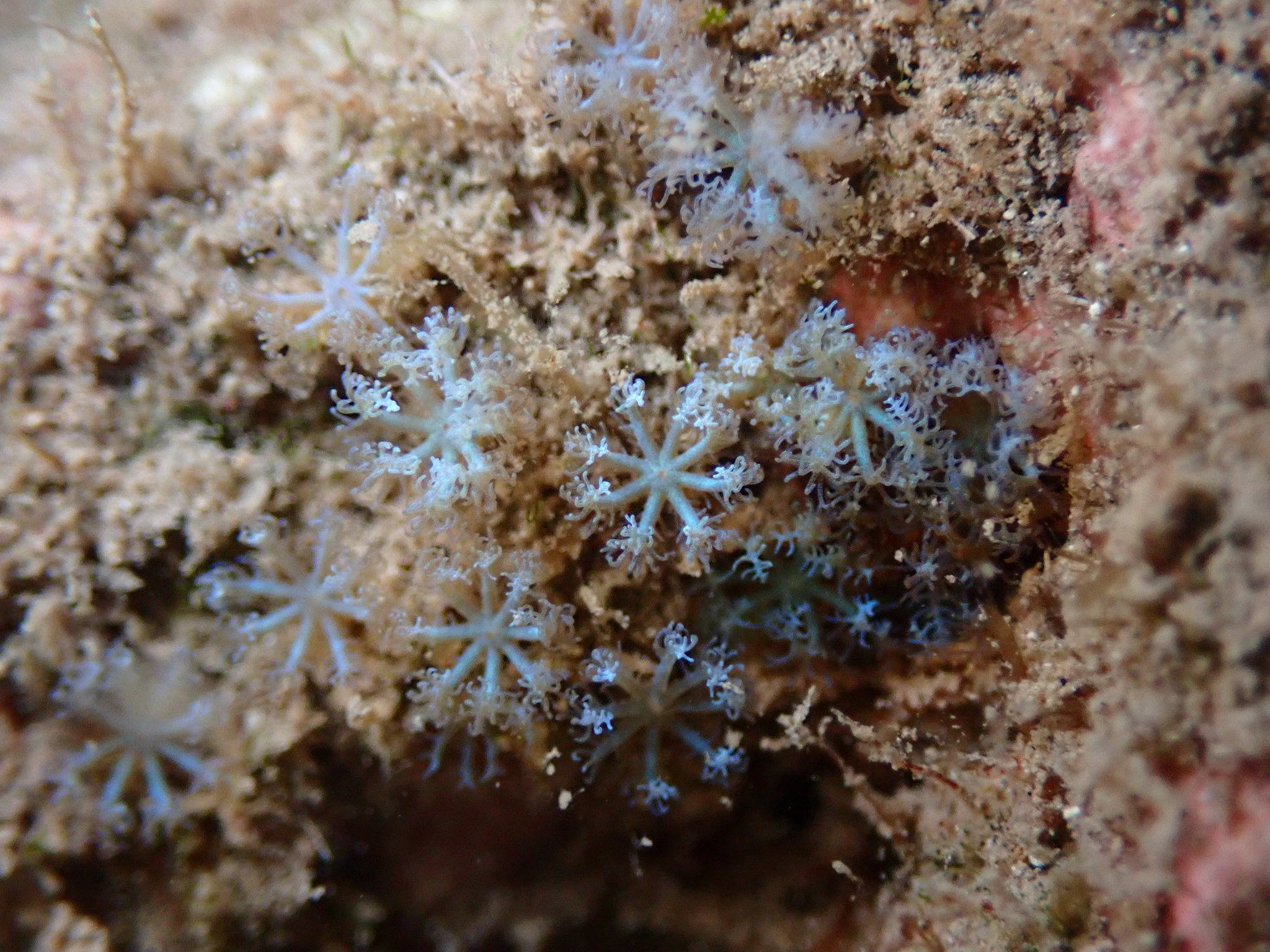

Scientific classification
- Kingdom: Animalia
- Phylum: Cnidaria
- Subphylum: Anthozoa
- Class: Octocorallia
- Order: Malacalcyonacea
- Family: Xeniidae
- Genus: Sarcothelia; Verrill, 1928
- Species: S. edmondsoni

Binomial name
- Sarcothelia edmondsoni Verrill, 1928

= Sarcothelia =

Genus of corals

Sarcothelia is a genus of soft corals in the family Xeniidae.

== Taxonomy ==
Two species are known, Sarcothelia edmondsoni and S. indica.
