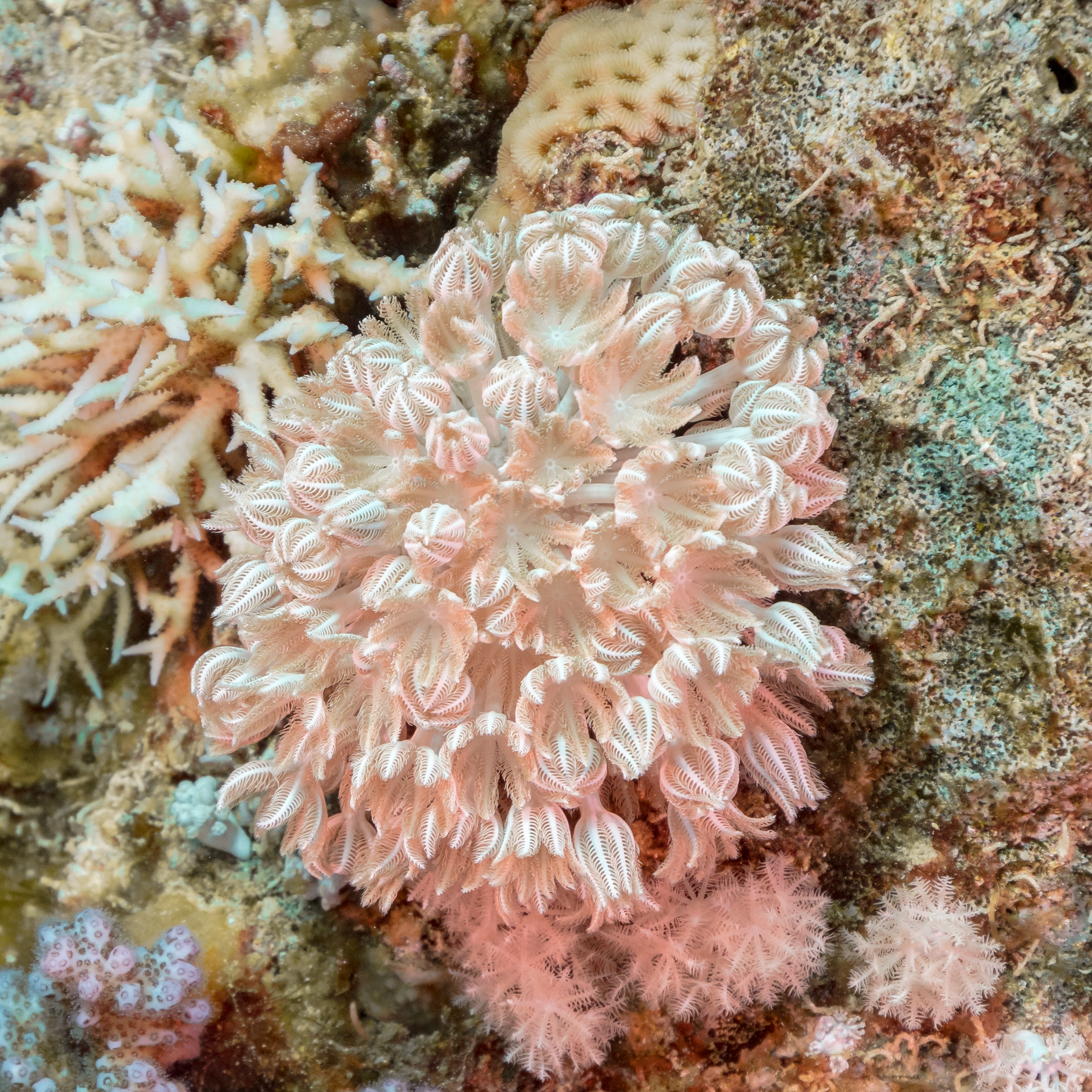
- Xenia umbellata

Scientific classification
- Kingdom: Animalia
- Phylum: Cnidaria
- Subphylum: Anthozoa
- Class: Octocorallia
- Order: Malacalcyonacea
- Family: Xeniidae
- Genus: Xenia; Lamarck, 1816

Species
- Many; see text

= Xenia (coral) =

Genus of corals

Xenia is a genus of photosynthetic soft marine coral in the family Xeniidae. They resemble a mushroom, with "arms" coming out from the top that ends in many-fingered "hands". It is unique among corals because of its ability to use its "hands" to "pulse" or push water away from the colony in a constant, grabbing motion. Common names include fast-pulse Xenia. Species of Xenia are sometimes referred to as pulse corals.

== Species ==
The World Register of Marine Species lists the following species:

- Xenia amparoi Roxas, 1933
- Xenia antarctica Kükenthal, 1902
- Xenia ashworthi Kükenthal, 1902
- Xenia bauiana May, 1899
- Xenia blumi Schenk, 1896
- Xenia brunnea Saville Kent, 1893
- Xenia capitata Duchassaing & Michelotti, 1860
- Xenia coerulea Ehrenberg, 1834
- Xenia crassa Schenk, 1896
- Xenia crispitentaculata Verseveldt, 1977
- Xenia cylindrica Roxas, 1933
- Xenia danae Verrill, 1869
- Xenia dayi Tixier-Durivault, 1959
- Xenia delicata Roxas, 1933
- Xenia depressa Kükenthal, 1909
- Xenia distorta Tixier-Durivault, 1966
- Xenia elongata Dana, 1846
- Xenia felicianoi Roxas, 1933
- Xenia fimbriata Utinomi, 1955
- Xenia fisheri Roxas, 1933
- Xenia flava Roxas, 1933
- Xenia flexibilis Halász, McFadden, Toonen & Benayahu, 2019
- Xenia fusca Schenk, 1896
- Xenia garciae Bourne, 1894
- Xenia grasshoffi Verseveldt, 1974
- Xenia hicksoni Ashworth, 1899
- Xenia humilis Verseveldt, 1977
- Xenia indivisa Sars, 1857
- Xenia intermedia Roxas, 1933
- Xenia konohana Koido, Imahari & Fukami, 2022
- Xenia kuekenthali Roxas, 1933
- Xenia kusimotoensis Utinomi, 1955
- Xenia lepida Verseveldt, 1971
- Xenia lillieae Roxas, 1933
- Xenia mayi Roxas, 1933
- Xenia medusoides May, 1899
- Xenia membranacea Schenk, 1896
- Xenia mucosa Verseveldt & Tursch, 1979
- Xenia multipinnata (Tixier-Durivault, 1966)
- Xenia multispiculata Kükenthal, 1909
- Xenia novaebritanniae Ashworth, 1900
- Xenia novaecaledoniae Verseveldt, 1974
- Xenia ochracea Saville Kent, 1893
- Xenia puertogalerae Roxas, 1933
- Xenia pulsitans Saville Kent, 1893
- Xenia quinqueserta May, 1899
- Xenia rubens Schenk, 1896
- Xenia samoensis Kölliker, 1865
- Xenia sansibariana May, 1899
- Xenia schenki Roxas, 1933
- Xenia sexseriata Verseveldt, 1977
- Xenia spicata Li, 1982
- Xenia stellifera Verseveldt, 1977
- Xenia ternatana Schenk, 1896
- Xenia tripartita Roxas, 1933
- Xenia tumbatuana May, 1898
- Xenia umbellata Lamarck, 1816
- Xenia viridis Schenk, 1896
