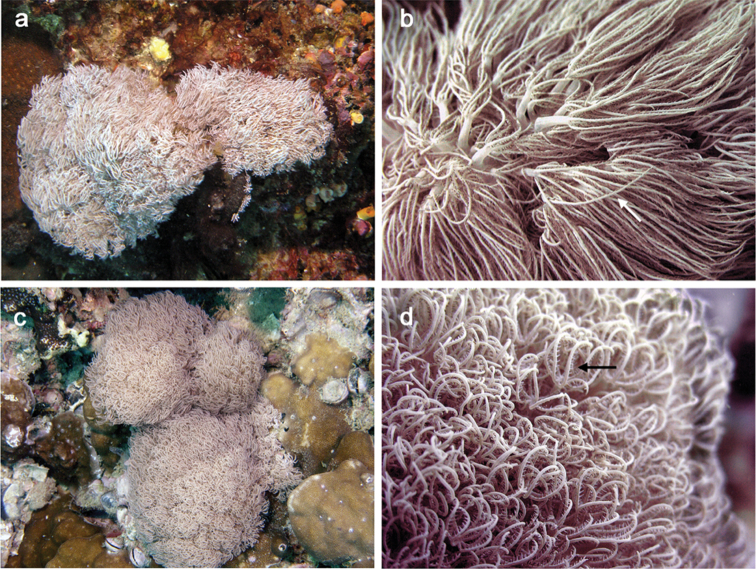
- Ovabunda andamanensis

Scientific classification
- Kingdom: Animalia
- Phylum: Cnidaria
- Subphylum: Anthozoa
- Class: Octocorallia
- Order: Alcyonacea
- Family: Xeniidae
- Genus: Ovabunda; Alderslade, 2001

Species
- See text

= Ovabunda =

Genus of corals

Ovabunda is a genus of soft corals in the family Xeniidae.

== Species ==
The World Register of Marine Species lists the following species:

- Ovabunda ainex (Reinicke, 1997)
- Ovabunda andamanensis Janes, McFadden & Chanmethakul, 2014
- Ovabunda arabica (Reinicke, 1995)
- Ovabunda benayahui (Reinicke, 1995)
- Ovabunda biseriata (Verseveldt & Cohen, 1971)
- Ovabunda crenata (Reinicke, 1997)
- Ovabunda faraunenesis (Verseveldt & Cohen, 1971)
- Ovabunda gohari (Reinicke, 1997)
- Ovabunda hamsina (Reinicke, 1997)
- Ovabunda impulsatilla (Verseveldt & Cohen, 1971)
- Ovabunda macrospiculata (Gohar, 1940)
- Ovabunda obscuronata (Verseveldt & Cohen, 1971)
- Ovabunda verseveldti (Benayahu, 1990)
