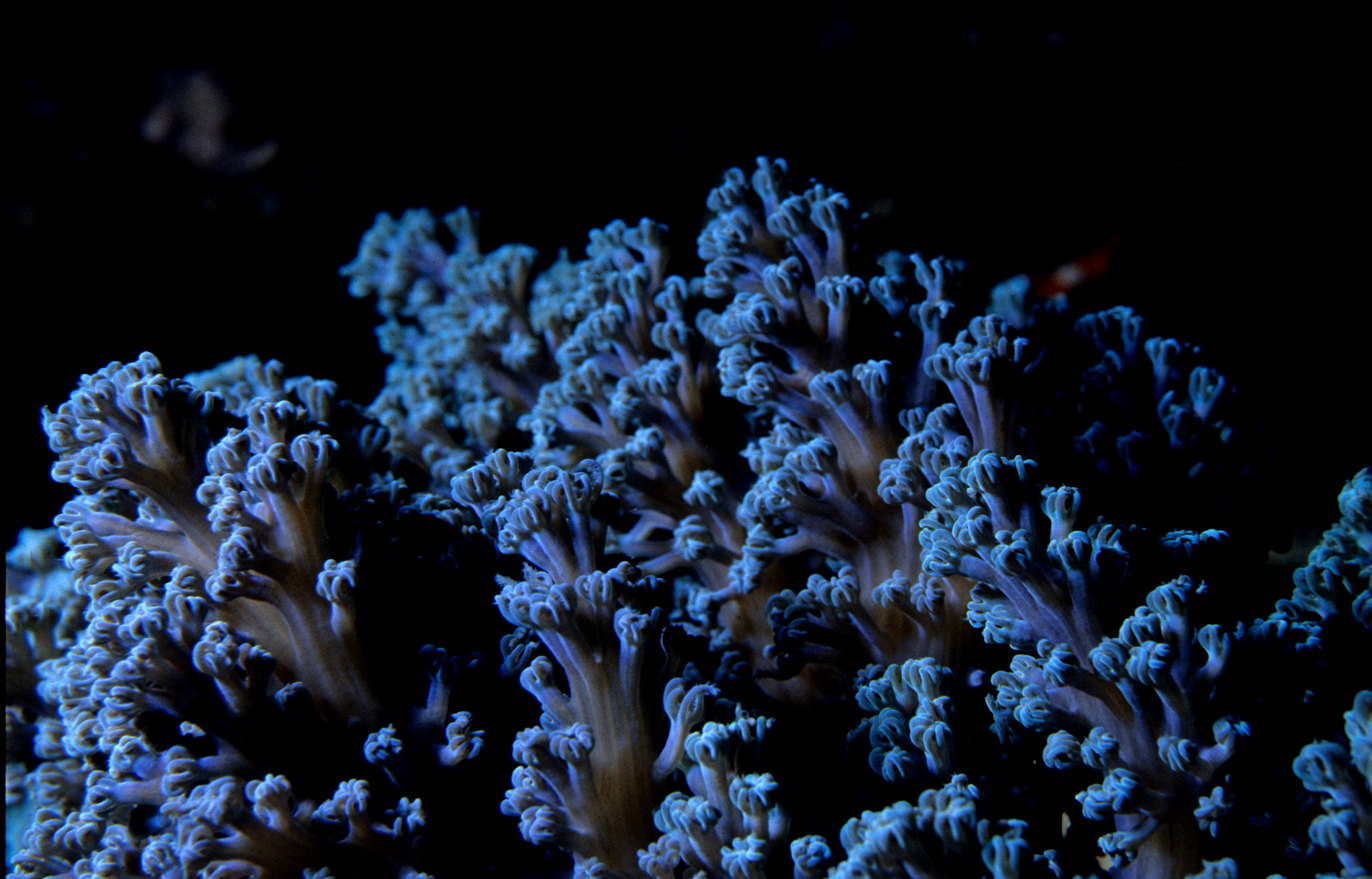
- Cespitularia sp.

Scientific classification
- Kingdom: Animalia
- Phylum: Cnidaria
- Subphylum: Anthozoa
- Class: Octocorallia
- Order: Alcyonacea
- Family: Xeniidae
- Genus: Cespitularia; Milne Edwards & Haime, 1850

Species
- See text

= Cespitularia =

Genus of corals

Cespitularia is a genus of soft corals in the family Xeniidae.

== Species ==
The World Register of Marine Species lists the following species:

- Cespitularia coerula May, 1898
- Cespitularia densa Tixier-Durivault, 1966
- Cespitularia erecta Macfadyen, 1936
- Cespitularia exigua Verseveldt, 1970
- Cespitularia hypotentaculata Roxas, 1933
- Cespitularia infirmata Verseveldt, 1977
- Cespitularia mantoni Hickson, 1931
- Cespitularia mollis (Brundin, 1896)
- Cespitularia multipinnata (Quoy & Gaimard, 1833)
- Cespitularia quadriserta Roxas, 1933
- Cespitularia robusta Tixier-Durivault, 1966
- Cespitularia schlichteri Janes, 2008
- Cespitularia simplex Thomson & Dean
- Cespitularia stolonifera Gohar, 1938
- Cespitularia subviridus (Quoy & Gaimard, 1833)
- Cespitularia taeniata May, 1899
- Cespitularia turgida Verseveldt, 1971
- Cespitularia wisharti Hickson, 1931
