= Asterospicularia =

Scientific classification
- Kingdom: Animalia
- Phylum: Cnidaria
- Subphylum: Anthozoa
- Class: Octocorallia
- Order: Alcyonacea
- Family: Xeniidae
- Genus: Asterospicularia; Utinomi, 1951

Species
- See text

Genus of corals

Asterospicularia is a genus of soft corals in the family Xeniidae.

== Species ==
The World Register of Marine Species lists the following species:

- Asterospicularia laurae Utinomi, 1951
- Asterospicularia randalli Gawel, 1976
