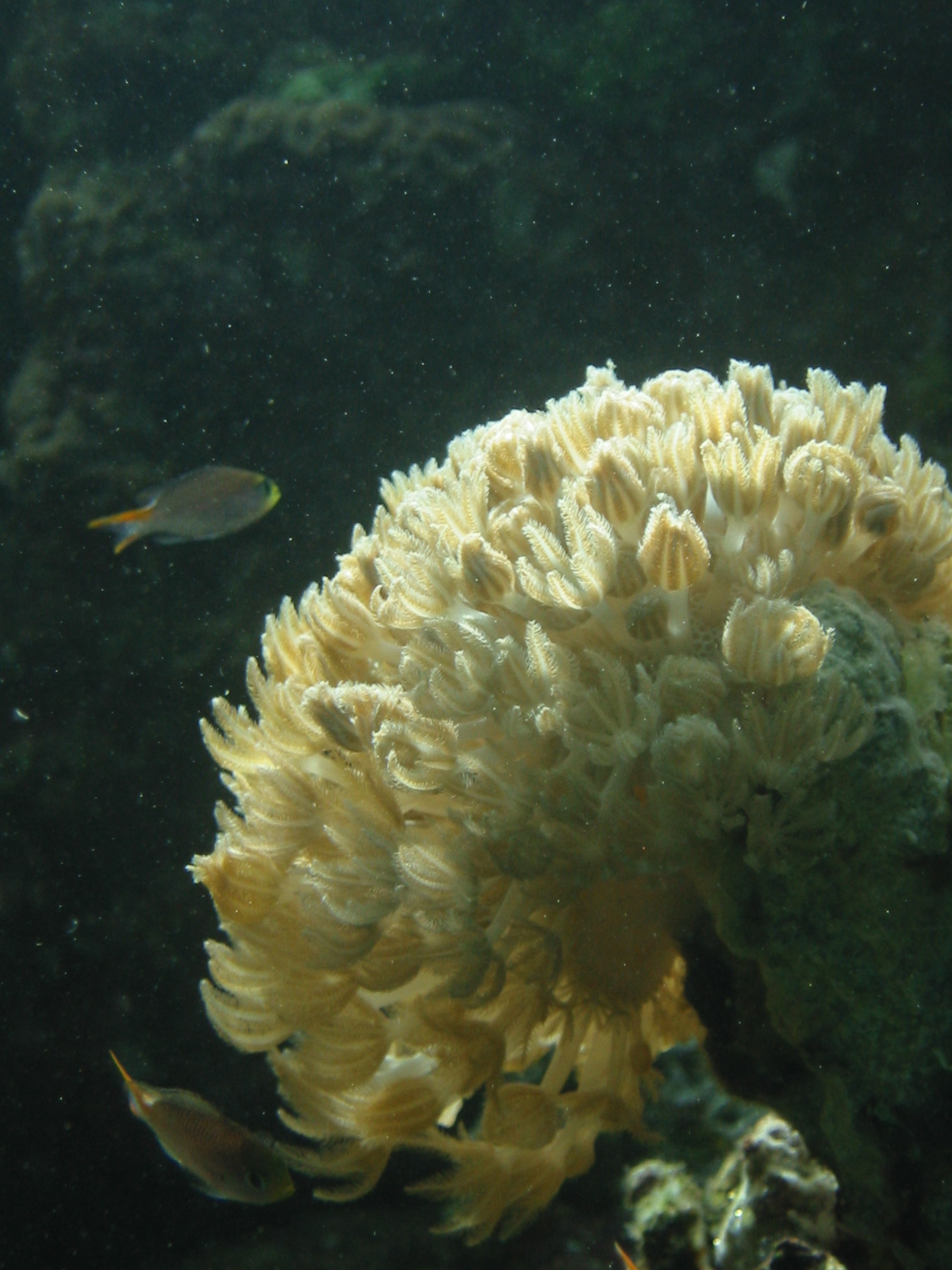

Scientific classification
- Kingdom: Animalia
- Phylum: Cnidaria
- Subphylum: Anthozoa
- Class: Octocorallia
- Order: Malacalcyonacea
- Family: Xeniidae
- Genus: Heteroxenia
- Species: H. fuscescens

Binomial name
- Heteroxenia fuscescens (Ehrenberg, 1834)

= Heteroxenia fuscescens =

Species of coral

Heteroxenia fuscescens is a species of soft coral in the family Xeniidae. The species was first described in 1834 by Christian Gottfried Ehrenberg as Xenia fuscescens.

== Description ==
The polyps of Heteroxenia fuscescens grow to form large clumping colonies up to 60 centimetres (24 in) across. Its polyp stalks are approximately 5 centimetres (2.0 in) long, each stalk ending in a ring of large feathery pinnate tentacles, eight per polyp, as is typical of octocorals Polyps pulsate rhythmically around 40 times/ minute, moving their tentacles in a "pumping" or "pulsating" fashion. The function of this pulsing is not fully understood. Some hypotheses include creating a current to assist feeding, respiration, and helping to dispose of waste and detritus. It contains zooxanthellae, and draws most of its energy from these symbiotes.

== Distribution ==
These corals live on hard bottoms of lagoons and bays, and slopes with little current, and occurs from the Red Sea to the Indian Ocean.

== In the aquarium ==
This species, along with most other xeniids, are prized in the aquarium hobby for the rhythmic "pumping" of the polyps, and the ease of reproduction. However they tend to grow like weeds in the right environment and can quickly cover a tank. In some captive environments they may stop pulsing for long periods of time with no other signs of stress and suddenly start pulsing again later on as if there was never a problem. This may be due to instability in water conditions. Some hobbyists claim that the addition of iodide may help this species but there is only circumstantial evidence to suggest that.

Heteroxenia are very closely related to other xenia species and take an expert eye to identify. Heteroxenia grow smaller tentacles between the larger tentacles in mature specimen.
