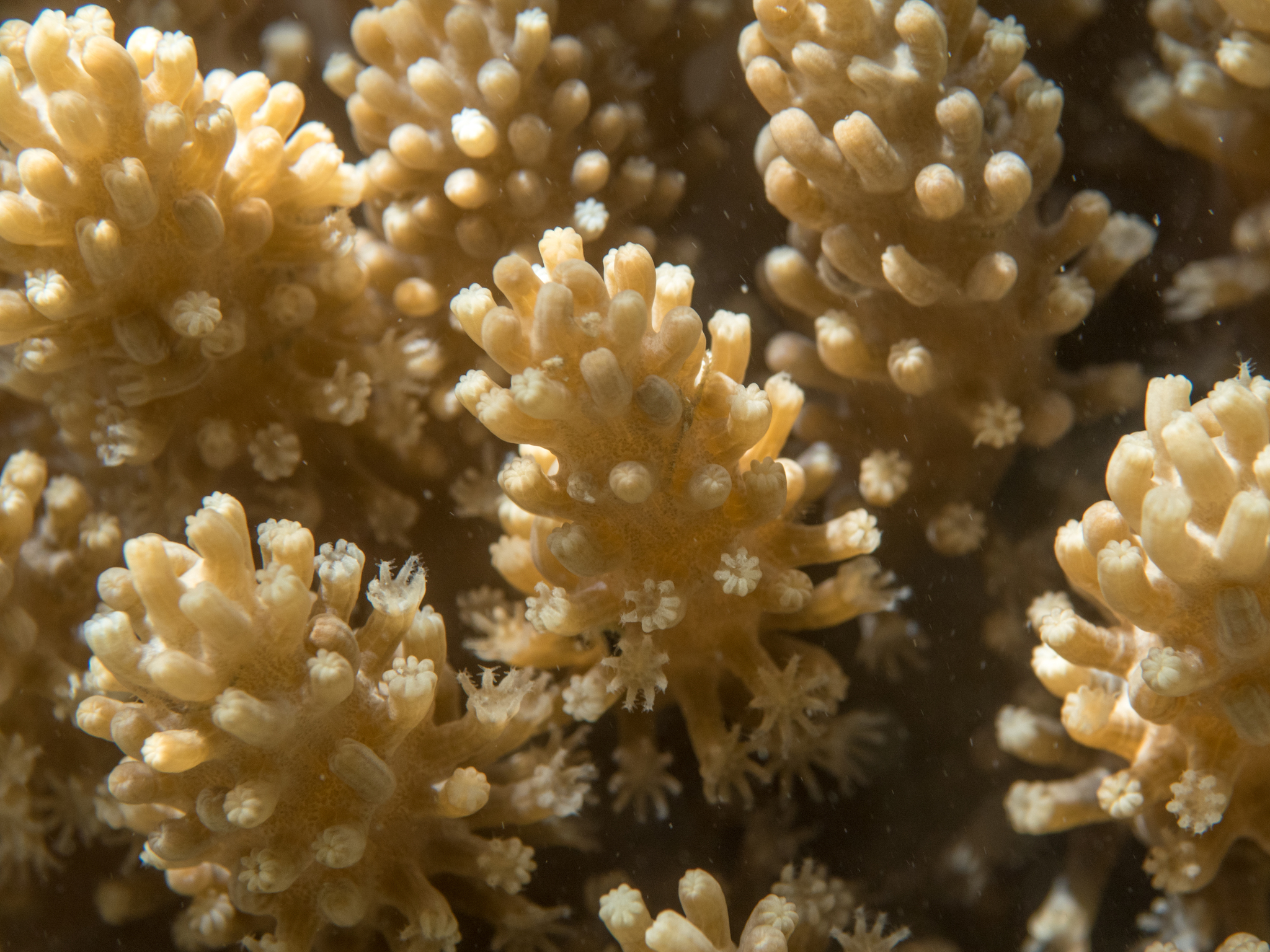
- Sympodium gibbaeum

Scientific classification
- Kingdom: Animalia
- Phylum: Cnidaria
- Subphylum: Anthozoa
- Class: Octocorallia
- Order: Alcyonacea
- Family: Xeniidae
- Genus: Sympodium; Ehrenberg, 1834

= Sympodium (coral) =

Genus of corals

Sympodium is a genus of soft corals in the family Xeniidae.

== Species ==
The following species are recognised in the genus Sympodium:

- Sympodium abyssorum Danielssen, 1887
- Sympodium caeruleum Ehrenberg, 1834
- Sympodium epiphytum Benayahu, Ekins & McFadden, 2021
- Sympodium gibbaeum Benayahu, Ekins & McFadden, 2021
- Sympodium hexagonotus Benayahu, Ekins & McFadden, 2021
- Sympodium omasum Koido, Imahara & Fukami, 2024
- Sympodium subtilis Benayahu, Ekins & McFadden, 2021
- Sympodium tamatavense Cohn, 1907
- Sympodium vegrandis Benayahu, Ekins & McFadden, 2021
- Sympodium yonaguniensis Benayahu, Ekins & McFadden, 2021
