= Ezziona =

Scientific classification
- Kingdom: Animalia
- Phylum: Cnidaria
- Subphylum: Anthozoa
- Class: Octocorallia
- Order: Malacalcyonacea
- Family: Xeniidae
- Genus: Ezziona; Alderslade & Janes, 2017
- Species: E. dinesenae

Binomial name
- Ezziona dinesenae (Alderslade, 2001)

Synonyms
- Genus synonymy: Ixion Alderslade, 2001; Species synonymy: Ixion dinesenae Alderslade, 2001

Genus of corals

Ezziona is a genus of soft corals in the family Xeniidae. It is monotypic with a single species, Ezziona dinesenae.
