= Reflec Beat =

2010 rhythm game series

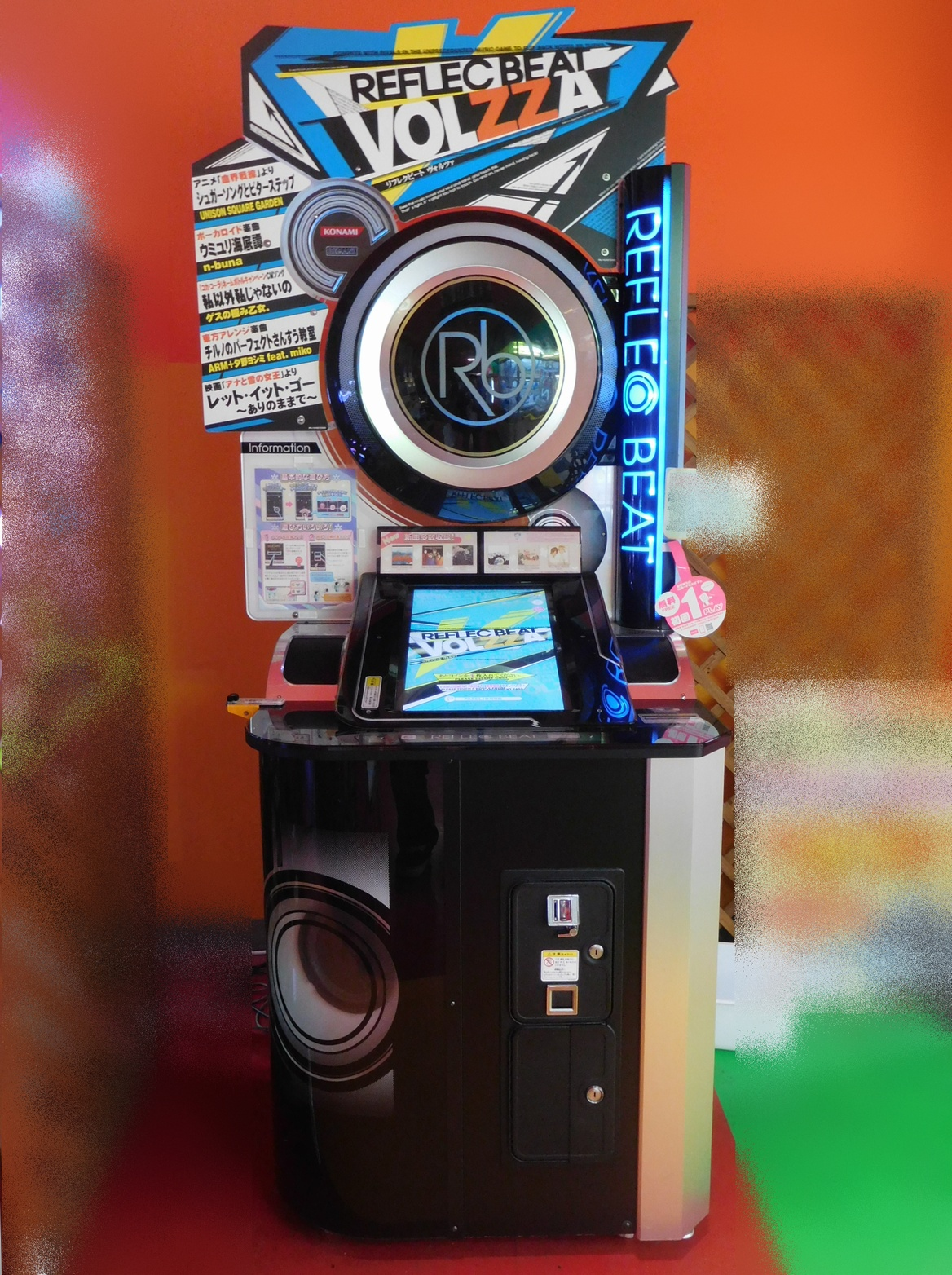
- Reflec Beat Volzza machine
- Genre: Music
- Developer: Konami
- Publisher: Konami
- Platforms: Arcade, iOS
- First release: Reflec Beat; November 4, 2010
- Latest release: Reflec Beat: The Reflesia of Eternity; December 1, 2016

Reflec Beat (Note: Rifureku Bīto (Japanese: リフレクビート), stylized in all caps and occasionally shortened to RB) is a series of music video games by Konami which debuted in 2010. Reflec Beat uses a touch screen as its main method of control - the first in the Bemani series to do so - and has gameplay based on 2-player competition, which has been compared to air hockey.

Originally released for arcades, six versions, not including expanded update versions, have been released. The gameplay has been ported to iOS as REFLEC BEAT plus, which has in turn been localised and released worldwide as REFLEC BEAT +.

== Gameplay ==
Reflec Beat's gameplay consists of touching circular "Objects" as they reach the judgement area. There are two sets of judgement areas, one for each player and colour-coded red and blue. Usually the second player is computer controlled, but can be human controlled using linked arcade machines, or a single iPad with the iOS versions.

After the player selected a song, Reflec Beat will automatically find an opponent who is playing the same song. If no opponents were found, it will automatically start the computer-controlled mode.

Players are scored on the timing with which they hit the Objects; in increasing order of accuracy and score, timing can be marked as Good→Great→Just. On the contrary, players lose points if they miss an Object. Bonuses are given for a Full Combo (hitting all the Objects) or completing the song with up to 2 misses.

As the players hit Objects with Just timing, the Just Reflec gauge fills up. Once one of the segments has been filled, the player can touch and flick an Object with the Just timing, and it will be reflected at the opponent. A Just Reflec gives bonus points to the user and a greater score penalty if the opponent misses it.

Typically, a song is considered passed if a player achieves 70% overall accuracy on it. Other selectable victory conditions also exist, such as completing the entire song with a life gauge which decreases with missed Objects (similar to Dance Dance Revolution's life bar) or causing a gauge to rise above a certain level by the end of the song (like the Beatmania series' Groove Gauge).

The songs are in 3 different difficulty levels: Easy, Medium, or Hard. In Reflec Beat Limelight, higher difficulty levels will be presented.

The note types are as follows:

- Regular Objects: These move down the screen to the player's judgement line, ricocheting off the sides of the screen. Regular Objects can have black or gold rims: only gold rimmed objects can charge up the "Just Reflec" gauge
- Chain Objects: These Objects are connected by a line. All Objects chained together will land in the same place on the player's judgement line. Each Object in the chain can be black- or gold-rimmed.
- Long Objects: These Objects are longer, and must be held for their full duration. As of Reflec Beat: The Reflesia of Eternity, Long Objects steadily increase the player's combo as they are held.
- Top Objects: These Objects are coloured green. Instead of moving to the player's judgement line, they move toward circular judgement zones above the line. Top Objects can be linked by chains, and Long Top Objects also exist. On Basic and Medium difficulty modes, two Top judgement zones exist on the left and right, with Hard mode and above adding a third in the centre.
- Vertical Objects: Introduced in Reflec Beat Groovin'!!, these Objects move straight down, and are regularly used to make complex patterns. Initially these had a downward arrow head motif, emphasising their different nature from regular Objects, but as of Reflec Beat: The Reflesia of Eternity, they appear identical to regular Objects. Vertical Objects can be black or gold-rimmed, and can be chained or Long much like regular Objects.
- Slide Objects: Introduced in Reflec Beat Volzza, these Objects move straight down and appear initially with an arrow head pointing to the left or right. The player must hold this Object and move their finger to follow the slide trail until the end. This variety of Object was removed from Reflec Beat: The Reflesia of Eternity, but remains in the iOS versions.
- Big Bang Objects: Introduced in Reflec Beat: The Reflesia of Eternity, these are much wider than regular Objects. They move straight down and when hit, cause the screen to shake. On lower difficulty levels, as of Reflec Beat: The Reflesia of Eternity, only Vertical and Big Bang Objects are used.
- Switch Long Objects: Introduced in Reflec Beat: The Reflesia of Eternity, these Objects are long, move straight down, and have areas where the player must hold and not hold down on them to maintain combo. These are only present on "White Hard" difficulty mode.

== Releases ==
=== Arcade ===
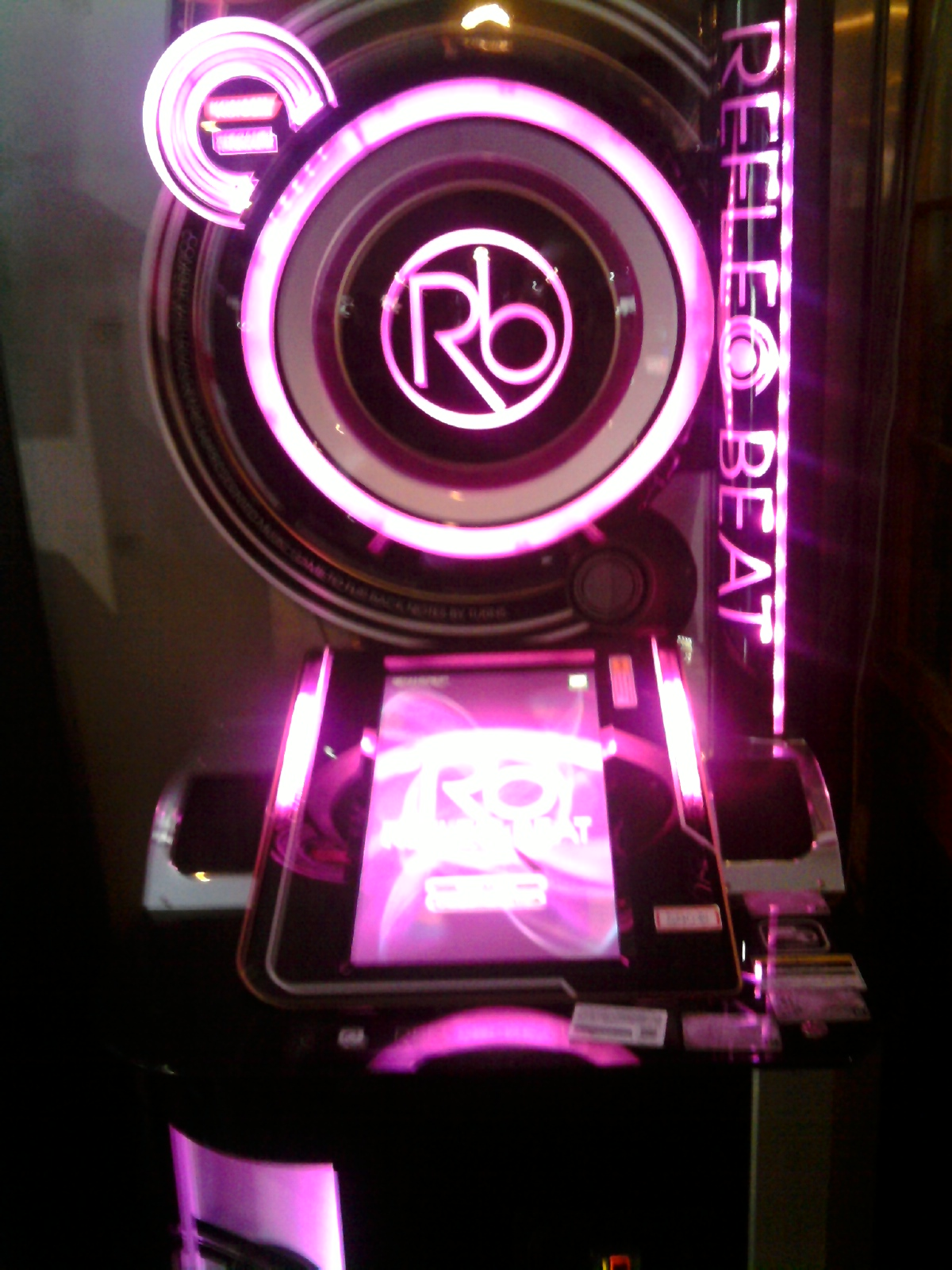
First generation Reflec Beat machine

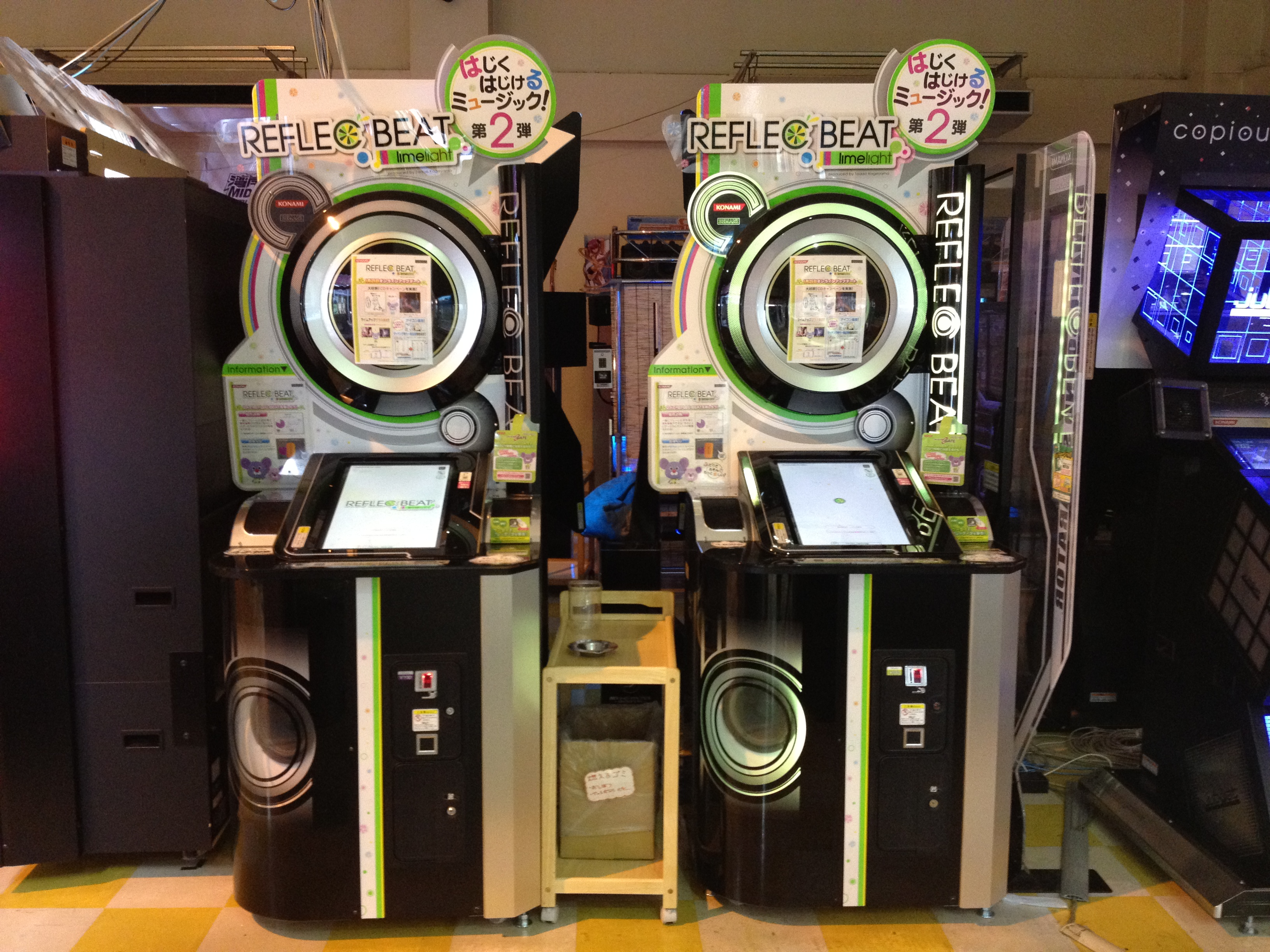
REFLEC BEAT limelight machines

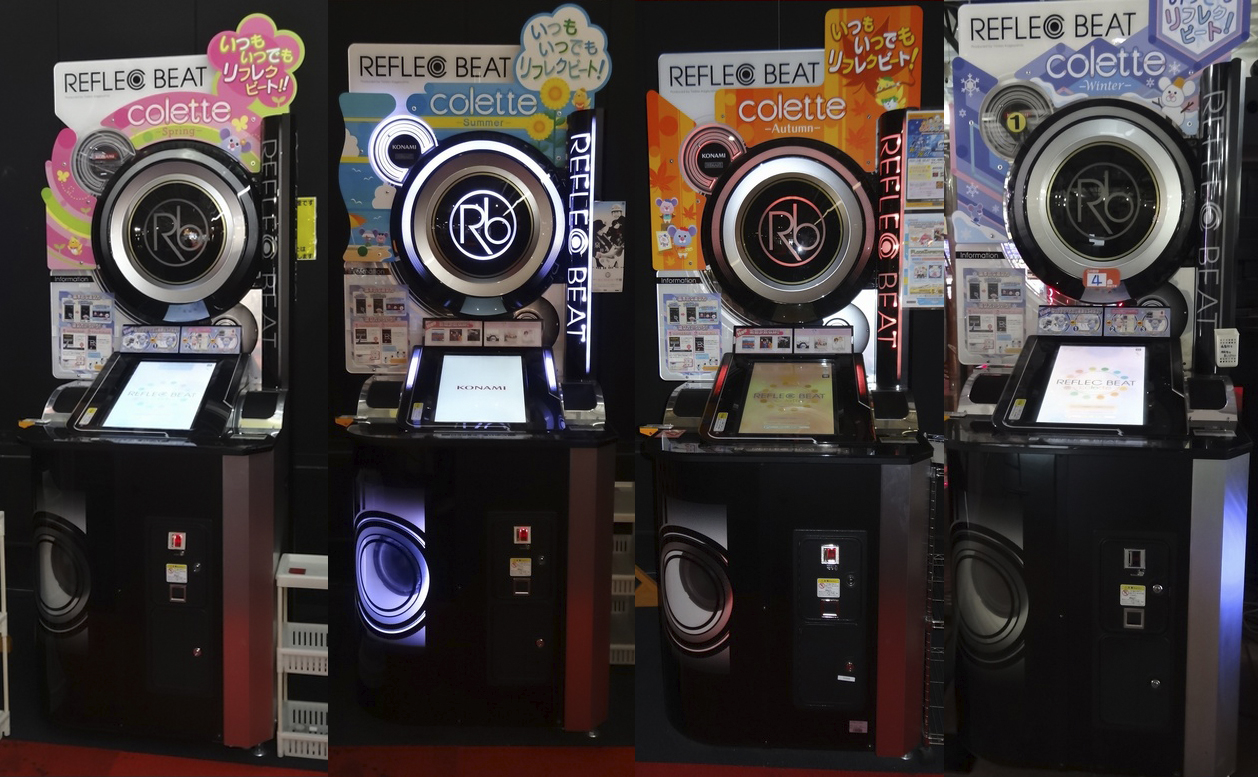
REFLEC BEAT colette spring, summer, autumn, and winter machines

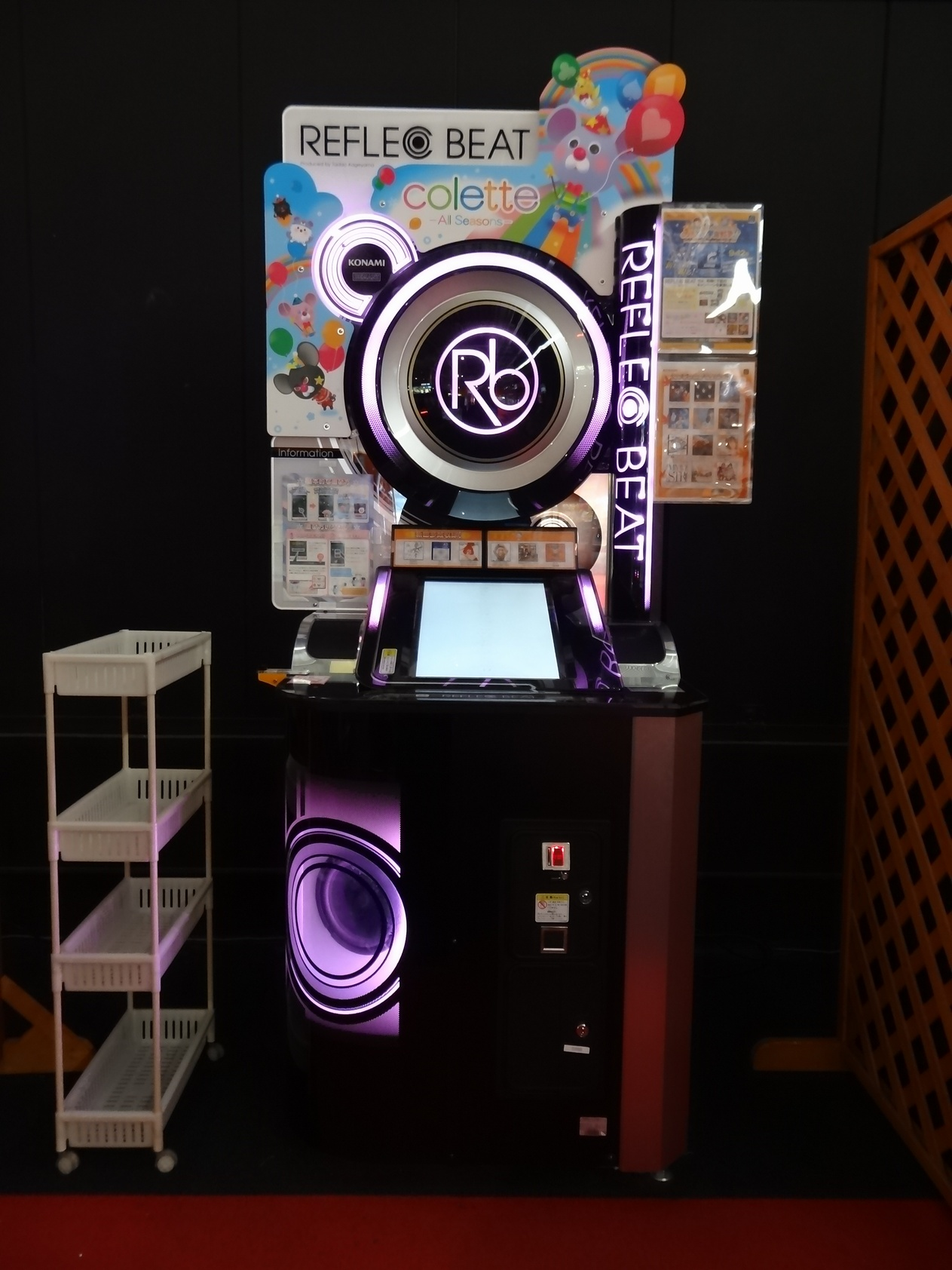
REFLEC BEAT colette all seasons machine

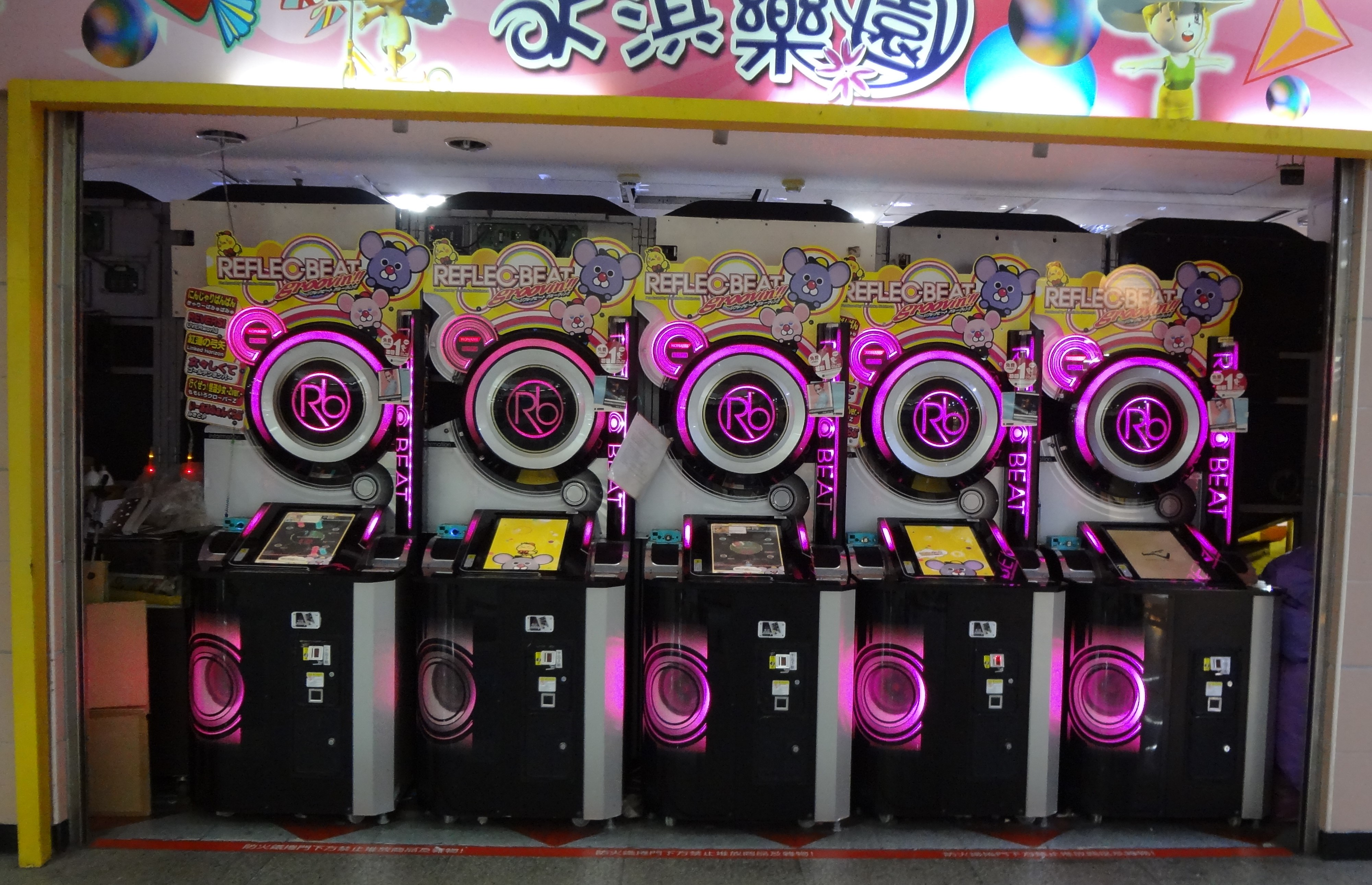
REFLEC BEAT groovin'!! machines

The initial release of Reflec Beat was location tested in April and June 2010, with the final release first appearing in arcades in Japan in November 2010, followed by expansion to other countries in Asia in 2011.

In 2011, Reflec Beat Limelight was released, which featured several new songs and refinements to the gameplay.

There was also a change in the grade system. In the system where the score was changed according to the winning and losing and the score at the end after finishing all the games in the early works, the lyme lights reflect the grades of the pure ones only when playing each song. The notation was also changed from D to S1 in green lime 0 to red lime 12. The color of Grade Lime is green - orange - blue - red in order, and the closer to red lime 12, the better.

The biggest change is the change of the top note, the top note is not available, and the normal is the top note in 2-top format as in Reflective, and the top note is randomly displayed in both sides of the top note. The top note has been changed to a three-tier format with three left, center, and right positions, and the top note has been fixed as far as the top note to prevent a certain difficulty from rising. By fixing the position of the top note, we can create more and more diverse chords.

On July 14, 2011, the Lincle LINK event began, featuring the games Beatmania IIDX 18 Resort Anthem and Reflec Beat. Upon completing certain objectives, songs from one game were unlocked in the other. In Part Five, the finale of the event, Beatmania IIDX 19 Lincle and Reflec Beat limelight were linked.

Reflec Beat Colette was released in late 2012, and featured a season motif, with the seasons changing from Winter, to Spring, to Summer, to Autumn throughout 2013. A final "All Seasons" update was later released.

Reflec Beat Groovin'!! was first released in 2014, with an expansion, Groovin'!! Upper, coming months later. These games introduced Vertical Objects, "Special" difficulty mode and song courses.

Reflec Beat Volzza was released in 2015 and introduced Slide Objects. An expansion, Volzza 2, was released in 2016.

Reflec Beat: The Reflesia of Eternity debuted in arcades in December 2016. The theme is RPG. The game was completely overhauled, removing almost every existing song from the song list and recharting the remaining songs. Special difficulty mode was replaced by White Hard, and old songs will return to the game on a regular basis as part of online updates. Systematically, batching speed, big bang and switch objects were added, and slide objects added in voyeur were deleted. Also, since the previous program is not used as it is, the existing data is incompatible and the contents are being renewed to the replicate specification.

=== iOS ===
Reflec Beat plus was released for iOS in 2011, with songs being obtained through purchasable song packs. The game has been gradually updated to match the same functionality as that of the arcade series.

An international version, titled REFLEC BEAT +, has been released. It has a reduced song list which consists only of original songs.

== See also ==
- List of Bemani series
