= Beatmania IIDX 22: Pendual =

2014 video game

beatmania IIDX 22 PENDUAL
- Screenshot of the game's title screen
- Developer: Konami
- Publisher: Konami
- Series: Beatmania IIDX, Bemani
- Platform: Arcade
- Release: September 17, 2014
- Genre: Music
- Modes: Single-player & Multiplayer
- Arcade system: Konami Bemani PC (E4690)

Beatmania IIDX 22: Pendual (stylized as beatmania IIDX 22 PENDUAL) is a music video game and the 22nd installment of Beatmania IIDX series of video game, a part of the long-running Bemani series. The theme of the game revolves around the concept of time with the theme split between the present and the future; Pendual itself is a portmanteau of "pendulum" and "dual". The UI mainly features white to symbolize the present and purple to symbolize the future. It was first announced during the BEMANI Namahōsō event on June 4, 2014, with location testing held from June 13 to 15, 2014. It was released on September 17, 2014.

== Gameplay ==
For more information about the gameplay of Beatmania IIDX in general, please refer to Beatmania IIDX#Gameplay.

Beatmania IIDX tasks the player with performing songs through a controller consisting of seven key buttons and a scratchable turntable. Hitting the notes with strong timing increases the score and groove gauge bar, allowing the player to finish the stage. Failing to do so depletes the gauge until it is empty, abruptly ending the song.

Beatmania IIDX 22: Pendual retains the core gameplay introduced in the first game. Players are required to hit notes that fall from the top of the screen at the hit zone using keys or turntables which are required to be scratched. Hitting the notes correctly will fill up the Groove Meter, while failure to do so drains it. Players must attain at least 80% of the meter at the end of the song to pass. Two gameplay variations introduced in Beatmania IIDX 17: Sirius: Charge Note (notes required to be held) and Backspin Scratch (spin the turntable at one direction and spin it at the opposite direction at the end) are retained. The player now has a choice to display their EX-Score instead of a combo during gameplay. Two new options were introduced—An Expand-Judge option, which increases the timing of the "Great" judgment, but the player's score and rank are rendered invalid; and Rotational-Random option, which shifts the hit notes to the left and right depending on the setting. Pendual features a new theme system which cycles the theme of the game throughout one to five days: the "present phase" features mainly whites in the UI with the in-game clock displaying the year as 2014 (or 2015), while the "future phase" features purples with the in-game clock displaying the year as 2222. Each theme has their own features, including songs. Throughout December 22, 2014 to October 28, 2015, players can now freely change the time phases by Paseli through a purchasable item, "Time Hourglass". Expert mode, a mode that plays through a course consisting of four (previously five) songs without stopping, has been revived by an update on February 14, 2015.

== Unlocking System ==
=== Chrono Chaser (One More Extra Stage) ===
The unlocking system which unlocks the One More Extra Stage had started on September 24, 2014. To access it, the player must attain a Full Combo with a higher grade while playing exclusive songs (chrono diver -fragment- and illuminate on "present phase", or chrono diver – Nornir and subtractive on "future phase") on the time phases. The gate would then be activated and would appear on subsequent playthroughs during the game's Final Stage. The player must then Full Combo the charts on the same difficulty without activating Random or Mirror modifiers with a higher grade during the Final/Extra Stage (the level and grade conditions are made easier for a higher difficulty as of December 22, 2014). Regardless if the player had succeeded on Full Combo or not, the door will change time phases (thus the unlock conditions must be repeated while on other time phases), but failing to do so will lose a chance (billed as 'Challenge Chance') to unlock the gate (and doesn't count towards the total Full Combo Count, as each successful Full Combo will produce a lightning effect). Failing to Full Combo three times would cause the gate to disappear.

When the player subsequently Full Comboed two other charts of the same difficulty as of December 22, 2014 (previously nine before November 5, 2014, and three before December 21, 2014), the gate would open and the player immediately accessed the One More Extra Stage automatically upon the difficulty the player had cleared on the last song (the player is forced to play on Ex-Hard gauge). Whichever song that will be played on One More Extra Stage varies on the time phase the player had activated the gate (cinder on the "present phase"; or Gravigazer on the "future phase").

Regardless if the player failed to Full Combo three times or has played the One More Extra Stage once, the player must start all over by Full Comboing the three charts again starting on the songs exclusive to the time phase.

As of April 22, 2015, conditions to access the One More Extra Stage were now simplified. The door now has a health bar system and the player must fully deplete the gauge in order to open the gate. Each Full Combo depletes half (50%) of the gauge, but every time phase switch (regardless of clears) will increase the gauge by 5%. As always, the difficulty played for the last song will be played for the One More Extra Stage, and the gauge will be restored upon the next activation of the gate.

On June 17, 2015, a new unlockable challenge was available. To activate the gate, the player needs to full combo K (for present phase) or eagle (for future phase) songs in another chart this time. Conditions to activate the gate were simplified on June 24, 2015, as players need to ex-hard clear on hyper or another. Conditions were further simplified on July 1, 2015 where the player needed to hard clear any chart on any difficulty. During the credit's final/extra Stage, a folder (Chrono Chaser Challenge) which randomly selects five songs on any selected difficulty (song conditions that can be fulfilled easily) would be available, and players can retain the Challenge Chances regardless of outcome and the modifiers selected. As with the previous challenge, the player must deplete the gauge completely (depending on the difficulty of the song selected in the last stage of the credit) in order to access the One More Extra Stage. (Say YEEEAHH on the "present phase"; or reflux on the "future phase").

In an update on July 1, 2015, players can unlock the first two One More Extra Stage songs (cinder and Gravigazer) on Expert Mode. Also, the gauge used for the One More Extra Stage is lowered to the Hard gauge. On September 1, 2015, the second set of One More Extra Stage Songs (Say YEEEAHH and Reflux) was added as an unlockable feature on Expert Mode.

=== Chrono Seeker ===
Chrono Seeker is the first unlockable event in the game which started on October 1, 2014 and ended on December 21, 2014. In this unlocking event the player must collect Crystal Shards for each respective time phase via each playthrough ("Present Phase" on the left, and "Future Phase" on the right). Each one of the time phases has a different condition to unlock for each gemstone row while on different difficulties ("Present Phase" has unlock conditions based on playing the songs, while "Future Phase" has unlock conditions depending on the Time and Date Settings). Completing the Crystal will unlock the song on the "Chrono Seeker" folder (accessible on Final/Extra Stage; once accessed, the player may not be able to return to the main song selection screen), and playing the song once will unlock another gemstone row and the song itself for regular play. (The opposing side on the same row unlocks the Console and Revival Songs, but was immediately unlocked for regular play instead).

When the player gathered all 12 crystals for the time phase (or getting more Crystals than the other time phase) and playing all four songs at least once, the fifth gemstone row will appear in the respective time phase. To unlock it, the player must play the songs based on the artists (猫叉Master in "Present Phase"; or L.E.D. in "Future Phase") in one credit after playing through all the songs under the respective version folder at least once (Pendual for "Present Phase"; or the version matching the Month Number for "Future Phase"). This will then unlock the boss song of the "Chrono Seeker" folder which are exclusive to the time phase (Symmetry in "Present Phase"; or Neo Generator Seven in "Future Phase"). Unlike those songs, they are not unlocked for regular play.

If the player gathered all 30 crystals (15 for each time phase) and played the boss songs at least once, the last gemstone row will appear. To unlock it, the player must input the Konami Code on the game keyboard (in order, Effect button twice, Vefx button twice, 1P Start Button once, 2P Start Button once, 1P Start Button once, 2P Start Button once, any of the Black Keys and White Keys), and then play the songs in relation to Gradius after playing at least one song from each game folder at least once to unlock Broken Sword in the "Chrono Seeker" folder. Playing Broken Sword once will mark the event complete and the boss songs (Symmetry and Neo Generator Seven) can now be played on all time phases.

After the event ended, any locked new songs (including boss songs; no longer time phase exclusive) can now be purchased through the online website (Moonlight Holograms, if the player unlocked the new songs during the event) using Fricos (formerly Dellars) for regular gameplay. Prior from January 21, 2015, any songs unlocked for regular play are still playable, except for the boss songs. On July 10, 2015, players playing via the Super Future time phase would automatically unlock all the event songs for regular play.

=== Qpronicle Chord ===
The second unlocking event begin on December 22, 2014 and ended on July 28, 2015. For this event, the player's avatar would have to revisit the three places again to defeat the monsters and maintain friendship with the Partners. The three places and their six partners are based on the previous three games (the locations were "Lincle Kingdom", "Tricoro City" and "Elferia" from the games Lincle, tricoro and SPADA respectively). The player firstly chose a location and rescued the partner to unlock the Normal Chart for the respective song of the version. Players would then play relevant songs depending on the location selected (and the three partners they select at the beginning (one main and two backups); can be toggled via the Vefx button at the location select screen) during each session to deal much higher damage to the enemies (damage can be dealt more if the player used items such as Time Hourglass, being precise in the minigame, or fulfil special conditions). The Partners would get experience points (proportional to the damage dealt) and level up after each playthrough (the selected partner got more experience points than the other two selected by backup), and if the combined partner's level reaches a certain amount, the player can unlock Hyper and Another charts the next time the player revisits any of the locations (providing the player must unlock all the Normal charts first). Once the partner's Another charts are unlocked, the location would be marked as a check.

Players can also raise the friendship (named "LOVE Bar") of the main partner they chosen. Though this doesn't affect the speed of unlocking the charts, the player must raise the partner's friendship to max to unlock customizations.

Player can also unlock Console Songs (and songs from the Coca-Cola x Bemani event which had been previously locked on January 22, 2015) if the player defeated certain rare enemies from any place they selected. The enemy appearance and the unlock conditions may also vary depending on the time phases and playthroughs.

After the first thirteen songs (and all the charts) have been unlocked, the player can access the Tower of Time Chord to unlock the last two songs of the event. Unlike the other locations, the conditions for unlocking are not varied based on any time phases, and don't require the partners to level up as a condition. The player would then scale the tower and by reaching certain levels at the end of a session, the player would be forced to play 共鳴遊戯の華 (Kyōmei Yūgi no Hana) as their One More Extra stage using the Ex-Hard gauge with Random and Mirror modifiers disabled. The chart played during the One More Extra stage would depend on how high the player had scaled the tower, and the player needs to play the song once for the chart to be unlocked for normal play. Unlocking this song fully also completes the event, which automatically unlocks several accessories and all the past three versions of design frames for use (all of which are redesigned). Note that the Chrono Chaser (the default One More Extra Stage song) event is temporary disabled until the final boss song is fully unlocked.

A ranking event, "Affection Ranking" was held from April 22, 2015 to June 23, 2015. This ranking event was split into three cups (Lincle, tricoro and SPADA in order) which lasted for three weeks each. Each cup was ranked based on how much the partner's friendship (on the respective versions) was raised. By taking part in each cup, accessories for the avatar would be unlocked. If certain conditions were met after participating in all three cups (at least 10 points in each partners), The Least 100sec would also be unlocked for regular play.

There were three chapters in this event and 16 songs (including six fromvthe console version and three from the Coca-Cola x Bemani event) were available for unlock.

=== Expert Mode ===
The mode which plays four (previously five) songs consecutively had returned since its last appearance in beatmaniaIIDX 19 Lincle via an update on February 14, 2015. They may still be able to set any of the modifiers permitted by the course. The gameplay would start when the player selects the course and the difficulty, and the player would pass if they cleared all four stages, or failed once the gauge is fully depleted (though the player can guarantee a few stages if they used Paseli). There are several courses which can be selected through Course Folders including:

- Internet Ranking (Courses of four songs are predetermined, and allow scores (EX-Score) to be submitted Online.)
- Hit Chart (The order of songs is determined by the frequency of the songs selected nationwide, starting from the least popular.)
- Monthly Hit Chart (The order of songs is determined by the frequency of the songs selected nationwide in a span of one month, starting from the least popular.)
- Local Original (The order of songs is set by the Arcade Operator. Players can also customise their own courses (My Original) and share it with other players nationwide, as well as songs alternating Single and Double Play in course.)
- Best (The order of songs is determined by the player's or their rival's four most played songs, starting from the least popular.)
- Random (Four randomly selected songs (can be all the songs, limited to Pendual songs, or Leggendaria (and alternate Another) songs) without revealing the songs until the course is selected. Locked songs or Non-Time-Phase exclusive Songs are excluded. Players may also spend two Time Hourglasses to change the order of the songs.)
- Secret (Courses which have one Expert-Mode exclusive song that has to be unlocked.)

To unlock the exclusive songs, the player must play the respective Secret Course a certain number of times under the difficulty the player selected for the course in order to unlock them. The bar would increase progressively depending on how well the player did in the course and the modifiers they selected, and if the bar is filled completely, the respective chart for the difficulty will then be unlocked for regular play.

On certain periods, players can vote for the songs during each credit by playing the songs under the "Expert Vote" folder. Players can cast a vote by selecting the song (up to four in one credit). After the voting period ends, the four songs having the most votes would be selected and compiled into a course.
