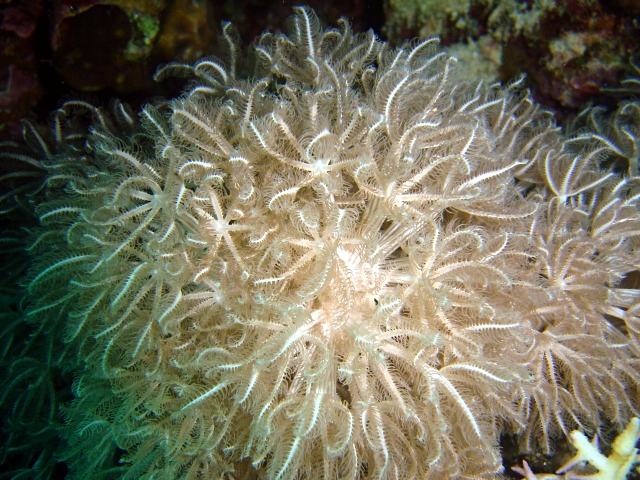
- Anthelia glauca

Scientific classification
- Kingdom: Animalia
- Phylum: Cnidaria
- Subphylum: Anthozoa
- Class: Octocorallia
- Order: Alcyonacea
- Family: Xeniidae
- Genus: Anthelia; Lamarck, 1816

Species
- See text

= Anthelia (coral) =

Genus of corals

Anthelia is a genus of soft corals in the family Xeniidae.

== Species ==
The World Register of Marine Species lists the following species:

- Anthelia elongata Roxas, 1933
- Anthelia fallax Broch, 1912
- Anthelia fishelsoni Verseveldt, 1969
- Anthelia glauca Lamarck, 1816
- Anthelia gracilis (May, 1898)
- Anthelia hicksoni Gohar, 1940
- Anthelia japonica Kükenthal, 1906
- Anthelia mahenensis Janes, 2008
- Anthelia rosea Hickson, 1930
- Anthelia simplex Thomson & Dean, 1931
- Anthelia strumosa Ehrenberg, 1834
- Anthelia ternatana (Schenk, 1896)
- Anthelia tosana Utinomi, 1958
