= Mayumi Morinaga =

Japanese singer (born 1981)

Mayumi Morinaga 森永真由美
- Also known as: moimoi, MAKI, senya, Prim
- Born: 19 September 1981 (age 44); Saga prefecture, Japan
- Genres: Electronic, Techno, Trance
- Occupation: Singer
- Label: Exit Tunes
- Website: mayumimorinaga.com

Mayumi Morinaga (森永真由美, Morinaga Mayumi; born 19 September 1981) is a Japanese singer whose career began in the late 2000s singing video game soundtracks. She debuted with her first single, "One Million Miles" in 2006, when she first collaborated with the group Another Infinity. She decided to become a singer in 1994, when she won a singing competition in junior high school. Her album Glitter peaked at number 31 on the Oricon chart.

== Discography ==
=== Singles ===
1. [2007.12.05] ONE MILLION MILES
2. [2008.12.05] DRIFT OF THE WIND
3. [2011.04.29] Exp.
4. [2011.09.07] EXTRA Whipping Cream
5. [2012.02.01] Ten no Jaku
6. [2012.12.29] Fortuna

=== Albums ===
1. [2012.06.06] Glitter / Kamiuta
2. [2015.02.04] Din Don Dan
3. [2019.03.06] All that is. Is that all?

=== Collaborations ===
1. [2017.05.22] This Moment / Relect feat. Mayumi Morinaga
