= Xeniidae =

- Top (A, B): Conglomeratusclera coerulea Bottom (C, D): Caementabunda simplex

Scientific classification
- Kingdom: Animalia
- Phylum: Cnidaria
- Subphylum: Anthozoa
- Class: Octocorallia
- Order: Malacalcyonacea
- Family: Xeniidae; Ehrenberg, 1828

Family of corals

Xeniidae is a family of soft coral in the order Malacalcyonacea.

== Predators ==
Predatory sea slugs of the genus Phyllodesmium are reported to feed on Xeniidae species. Representatives of this family have been observed to provide shelter to juvenile fish.

== List of genera ==
The family contains the following genera:

- Anthelia Lamarck, 1816
- Asterospicularia Utinomi, 1951
- Bayerxenia Alderslade, 2001
- Caementabunda Benayahu, van Ofwegen & McFadden, 2018
- Conglomeratusclera Benayahu, van Ofwegen & McFadden, 2018
- Ezziona Alderslade & Janes, 2017
- Fasciclia Janes, 2008
- Funginus Tixier-Durivault, 1978
- Heteroxenia Kölliker, 1874
- Ingotia Alderslade, 2001
- Latissimia Benayahu, Ekins & McFadden, 2022
- Orangaslia Alderslade, 2001
- Ovabunda Alderslade, 2001
- Protodendron Thomson & Dean, 1931
- Quattuoria Benayahu & McFadden, 2022
- Sansibia Alderslade, 2000
- Sarcothelia Verrill, 1928
- Sympodium Ehrenberg, 1834
- Unomia Benayahu, van Ofwegen, Allais & McFadden, 2021
- Xenia Lamarck, 1816
- Yamazatum Benayahu, 2010
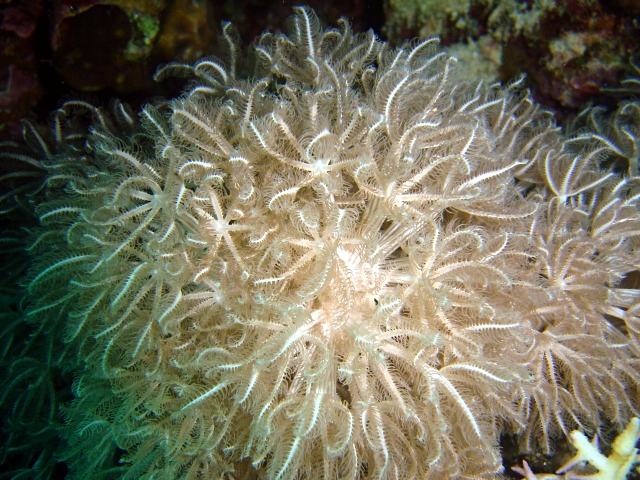
Anthelia glauca

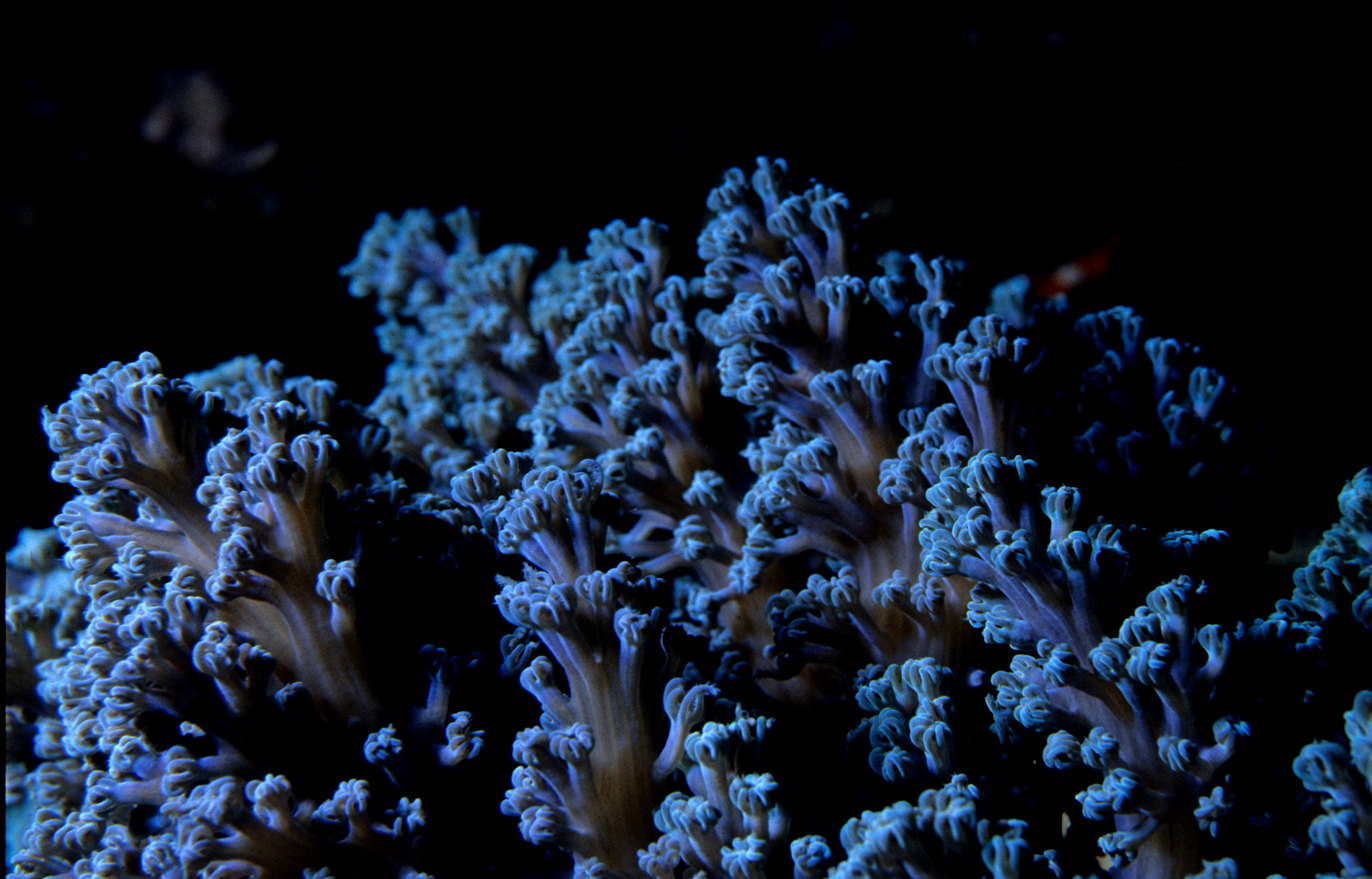
Cespitularia sp.

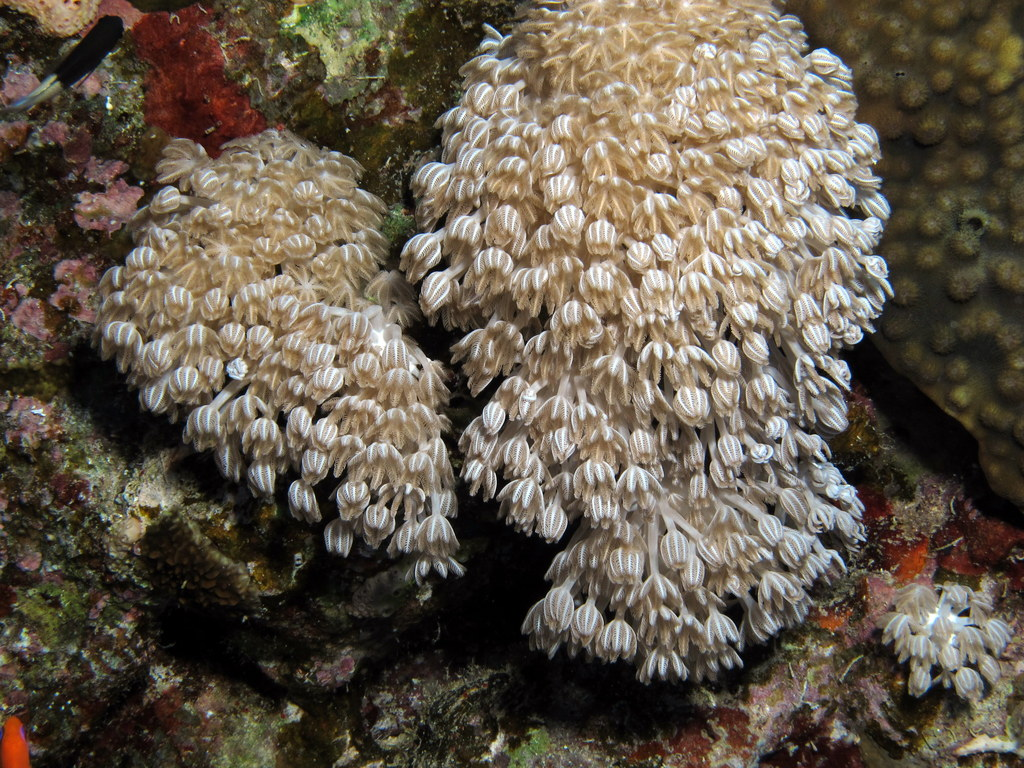
Heteroxenia fuscescens

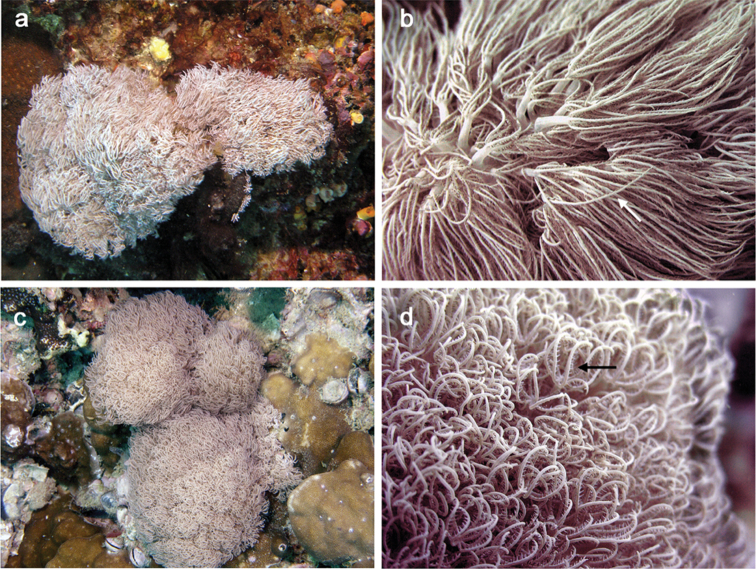
Ovabunda andamanensis

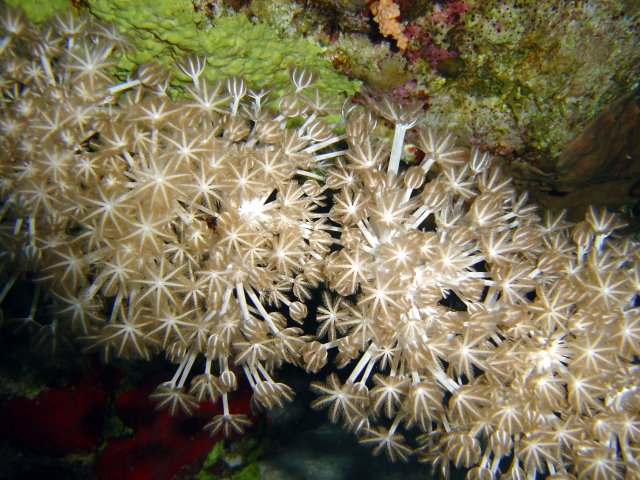
Xenia umbellata

Conglomeratusclera coerulea

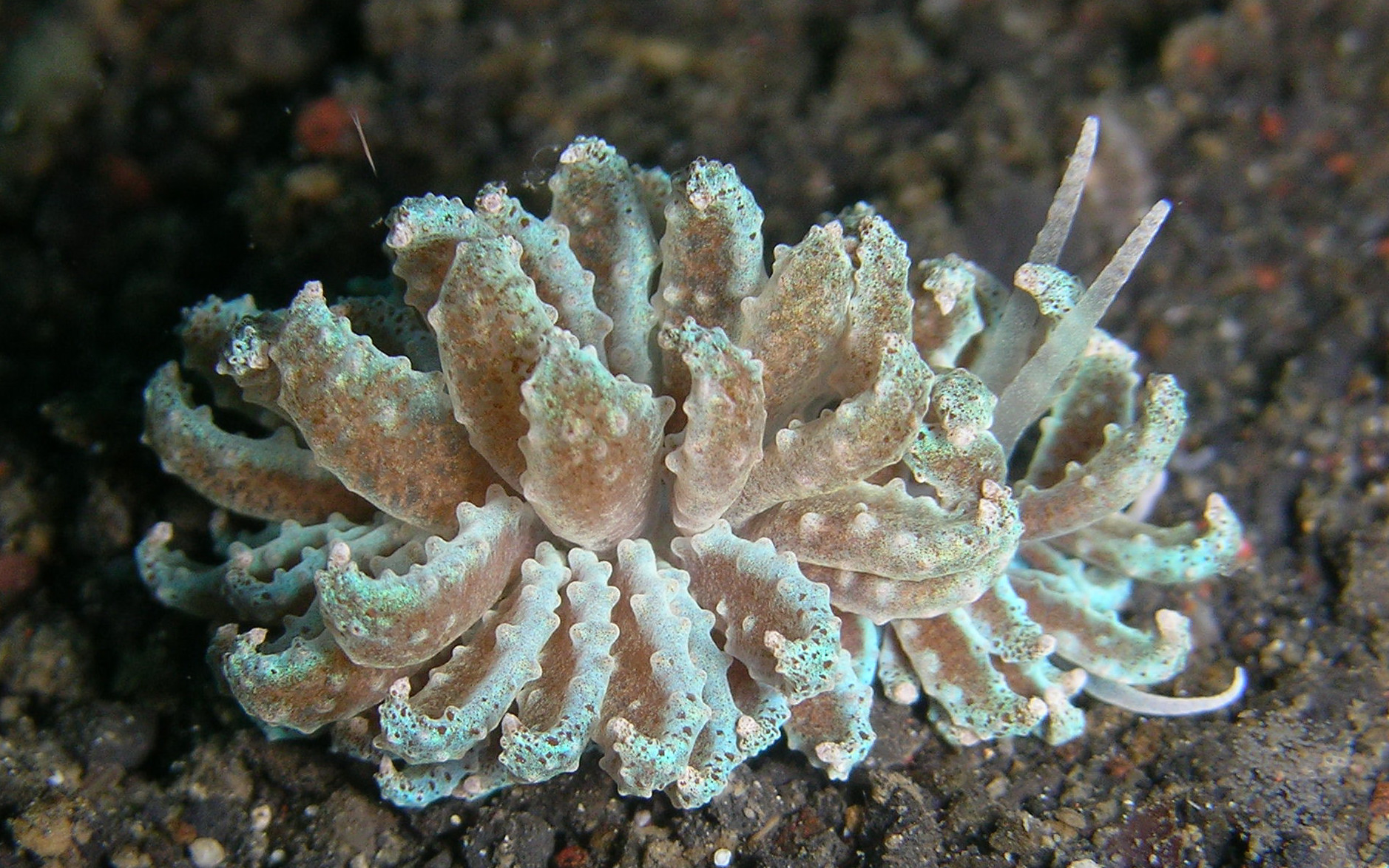
This nudibranch (Phyllodesmium crypticum) mimics Xeniid corals it feeds on

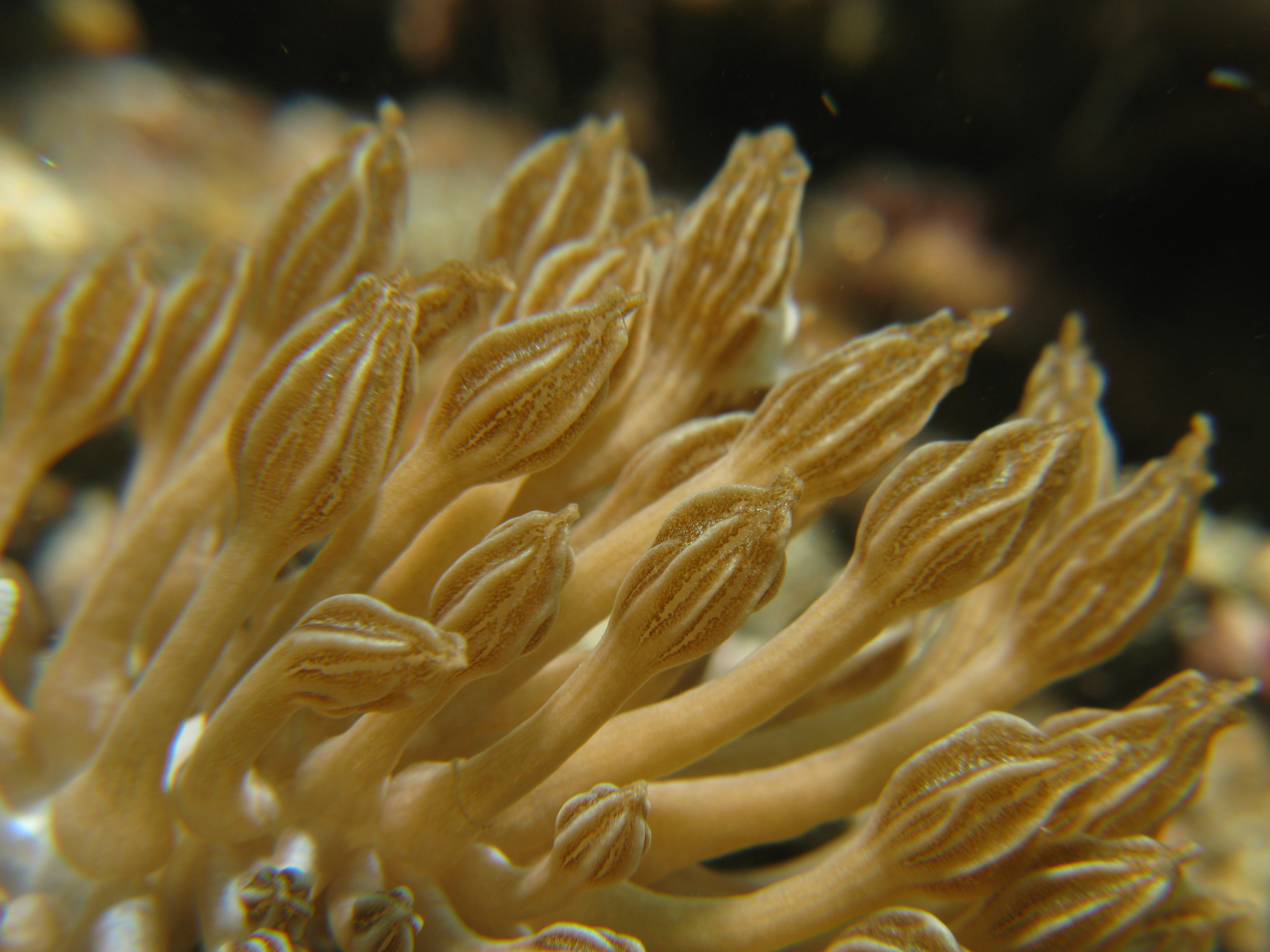
Cerates of a Phyllodesmium rudmani
