= Psenes arafurensis =

Conservation status
- Least Concern (IUCN 3.1)

Scientific classification
- Kingdom: Animalia
- Phylum: Chordata
- Class: Actinopterygii
- Division: Teleostei
- Order: Scombriformes
- Family: Nomeidae
- Genus: Psenes
- Species: P. arafurensis

Binomial name
- Psenes arafurensis Günther, 1889

Species of ray-finned fish

Psenes arafurensis is a species of scombriform ray-finned fish in the family Nomeidae (driftfishes).

== Overview ==
The banded drift fish (Psenes arafurensis) is a species of marine ray-finned fish belonging to the family Nomeidae. The family comprises sixteen species around the globe (Lee 2016). Psenes arafurensis is most similar to the species Psenes maculatus and Psenes pellucidus, differing mainly by its number of lateral line scales and vertebrae (Mahesh 2022).

The species was first described in 1889 by a specimen collection off the coast of Australia, being mentioned once more in 1939. However, this later reference unfortunately lacks any morphological description, contributing to the lack of information regarding this specific species of fish. Since then, the organism has barely been studied, and much of the knowledge surrounding it is a result of comparative observations of related or similar species either from the same family or with similar ecological patterns and habits.

A recent molecular study of the Nomeidae family through mitochondrial genome analysis of specifically the Indian drift fish have clarified the phylogenetic history of drift fish in the order of Scombriformes. Through research of 13 protein-coding genes, it was revealed that Psenes and Cubiceps share a recent evolutionary origin. This helps suggest that Psenes arafurensis likely possesses a similar mitochondrial structure to other Nomeidae, reinforcing the placement of the fish within the lineage and demonstrating shared evolutionary and ecological traits of other drift fish, which can be used as a resource to gain more knowledge (Peng 2021).

== Species description ==
Psenes arafurensis is a medium-sized, deep-bodied, and laterally compressed fish. The body is elliptical with a short snout and large eyes, which take up approximately 33% of the head length (Lee 2016) (FishBase 2025). Additionally, a terminal mouth containing a slightly slanted upper jaw can be identified. A single row of small teeth can be found on said jaw. The most distinctive characteristic, and that which differentiates it from other species, is the lateral line, which arches slightly and lies closer to the dorsal side of the body than to the typical midline (Lee 2016).

The banded drift fish demonstrates a combination of various metric counts and body features that distinguishes it from other members of the genus Psenes. It possesses 11 to 13 dorsal spines, followed by 18 to 22 dorsal soft rays, forming a continuous dorsal fin that is proportionally long in comparison to its body length. The anal fin is supported by three short but flexible spines and 21 to 23 soft rays positioned slightly behind the second dorsal fin. The species typically exhibits 21 vertebrae, which contribute to the compact and deep body form (FishBase 2025).

Adults are often uniformly black in coloration, a feature that can help distinguish them from related species containing lighter color patterns. The dorsal and caudal fin are described to be dark gray, the pectoral fin is translucent.

== Distribution ==
The banded drift fish typically inhabits both tropical and subtropical areas such as the Pacific, Indian, and Atlantic Oceans, and is often found at a depth of roughly 150 to 180m. It has been recorded in waters off of Jejudo Island, as well as at the eastern margin of the Yellow Sea and Korean Strait. Additionally, it has been spotted around areas such as Namibia, China, Indonesia, Japan, Australia, Hawaii, Papua New Guinea, Brazil, and the Galápagos Islands. The species is described to prefer open seas in addition to occasional bays and gulfs in epipelagic and mesopelagic zones.

== Ecology ==
=== Habitat ===
Very little is known about the lifestyle and ecology of P. arafurensis. Juveniles are reported to inhabit near-shore surface waters, while adults are thought to be benthopelagic. Its ecological role in the early life stages in the marine food web remains poorly documented.

The presence of a single row of teeth on both jaws indicates a more predatory diet, although detailed feeding behaviors are unknown. It has been reported that related Nomeidae species, such as Cubiceps and Psenes pellucidus, feed on copepods, amphipods, and gelatinous zooplankton (Hoffmayer 2017).

Juvenile drift fishes are frequently observed with floating Sargassum mats and other drifting objects closer to the open ocean. These can serve as nursery habitats, providing both shelter as well as feeding opportunities within the top water column. Studies in the Gulf of Mexico found that Sargassum communities host over 110 species of juvenile fish (Hoffmayer 2017). This behavior is one that mirrors observations regarding Psenes arafurensis juveniles, who also remain near the surface, suggesting similar strategies during early developmental years. The finding of juveniles towards the surface of a body of water leads to an association with other floating objects or jellyfish, again supporting the assumption of protection against predators as well as providing a feeding site on small zooplankton (Peng 2021).

Drift species are also known to form loose groups, particularly in midwater zones, especially around drifting objects even after their juvenile years. Research on their behavior shows that these groups could help the fish avoid predators as well as find food much more easily, this behavior helping explain the distribution of Psenes arafurensis (Tretler 2025).

=== Diet ===
P. arafurensis has been described as a mid-trophic predator, and so the assumption that the fish contributed to the transfer of energy from planktonic communities to much larger predatory fish such as tuna or sharks is realistic. Its nature also makes it potential prey to other larger predators (Peng 2021). Communities around Sargassum create a food web that supports both larval as well as predatory stages for various fish. Within this system, Nomeidae species act as intermediate consumers, feeding on small crustaceans and invertebrates that live within algal mats, while simultaneously becoming prey for larger fish such as tuna (Peng 2021).

The P. arafurensis exhibits a terminal mouth angled upward, another characteristic of an active midwater predator. The orientation of the jaw allows the fish to strike prey directly in front, enabling capture of free-swimming zoo plankton or small crustaceans (Battaglia 2014). Unlike species with superior or inferior mouths, a terminal mouth supports a pelagic foraging strategy where prey items may be suspended throughout the water column.

The lateral line is described to arch slightly and lie nearer to the dorsal region of the fish, a key sensory adaptation for detecting movement or pressure changes in the surrounding water. This positioning likely enhances the sensitivity of items located above the fish, such as approaching predators or drifting prey, and has a clear ecological impact on a fish inhabiting midwater zones. It can be inferred that in open ocean environments where visual cues are limited due to low light, both the described large size of eyes as well as the lateral line function as a system to allow the fish to orient itself in currents and detect prey motions even in the darkness.

== Life history ==
Reproduction involved pelagic or buoyant eggs, the larvae being born planktonic and then developing in open waters. Larval distribution has been documented in the northwestern Pacific, particularly along Japanese waters. As with other Nomeid fishes, the early life stages of P. arafurensis most likely rely on surface-dwelling habitats for both shelter as well as foraging, before dispersing offshore.

Based on reproductive studies on the closely related species Cubiceps whiteleggi, P. arafurensis could be expected to exhibit ovarian development and multiple spawning events in a singular reproductive season, a strategy that is often found in pelagic mid-trophic fish (Ohtomi 2022). Spawning time could be influenced by temperature, with mature females appearing much more often in warmer months. The exact reproductive cycle remains unknown for P. arafurensis, however, the species likely follows similar patterns due to both the ecological as well as phylogenetic similarity with other drift fish.

As with other members of family Nomeidae, P. arafurensis likely exhibits rapid growth and short generation time, with juveniles reaching maturity within one to two years. The transition from being surface-dwelling to a deeper living adult reflects a shift in the habitat as well as the diet. This is accompanied by the darkening of body color and the strengthening of certain swimming musculature to sustain more midwater movements and aid in camouflage. (Peng 2021)

== Conservation status ==
Psenes arafurensis is classified in the Least Concern category on the IUCN Red List, its last assessment being on the 29 of January, 2012. It poses no threat to humans. As of now, there are no major conservation concerns for the Psenes arafurensis. Its seemingly wide distribution and habitat range, along with a pelagic lifestyle, make it likely resilient to local disturbances. However, with the increase in ocean warming and deoxygenation, the populations could become affected due to altered prey availability or larval dispersal patterns.

In recent years, studies have been conducted in the North Pacific regarding impacts on mid-trophic fish populations due to human fisheries and other activities. Species within Nomeidae have been found to increase in abundance due to apex predator numbers declining. Mid trophic species exhibit annual increases of 6-8% per year, the shift reflecting a broadened concept of fishing down the food web (Polovina 2009). While Psenes arafurensis is not directly researched in this data set, its ecological location could suggest that it experiences similar trends. However, this same study also warns that mid-trophic species are often much more sensitive to climate change, low oxygen, and warming waters, and may therefore still face long-term impacts.

Nomeidae species in Southern Africa often appear in bottom trawl or pelagic fisheries, with species reaching especially high catch densities in Namibia (Piotrovsky 1994). This could potentially suggest that P. arafurensis may encounter similar bycatch pressures in areas where they are more present, even though this research does not directly regard the species.

Little is known about the commercial or recreational importance of drift fish. They are occasionally reported to be caught as bycatch by fisheries. Understanding their biology is therefore important in evaluating the ecological impacts of open ocean fishing practices.

The benefit of this species, which continues to be an infrequently studied, is that it offers potentially valuable insight for future genetic and ecological research, especially as the scientific world continues to uncover different evolutionary pathways for pelagic fishes.
