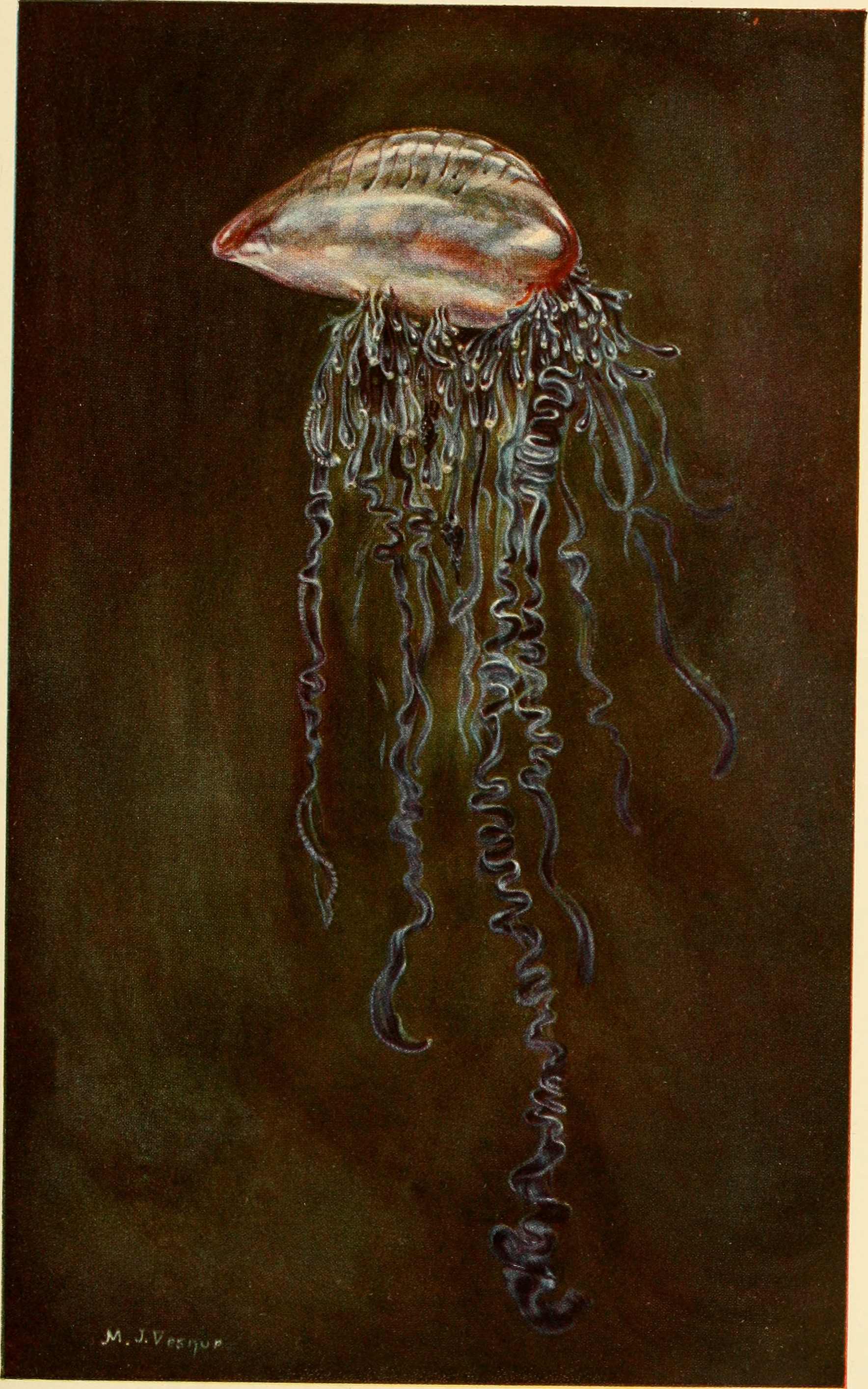
- Illustration of a Portuguese man o' war (Physalia physalis)

Scientific classification
- Kingdom: Animalia
- Phylum: Cnidaria
- Class: Hydrozoa
- Order: Siphonophorae
- Suborder: Cystonectae; Haeckel, 1887

Families and genera
- Physaliidae Brandt, 1835; Physalia Lamarck, 1801; Rhizophysidae Brandt, 1835; Bathyphysa Studer, 1878; Epibulia Eschscholtz, 1829 (taxon inquirendum); Rhizophysa Péron & Lesueur, 1807

= Cystonectae =

Suborder of hydrozoans

Cystonectae (from Ancient Greek κύστις (kústis), meaning "bladder", and νηκτός (nēktós), meaning "swimmer") is a suborder of siphonophores. It includes the Portuguese man o' war (Physalia physalis) and Bathyphysa conifera.

In Japanese, it is called 嚢泳 (Nōei).

The typical cystonect body plan has a pneumatophore (float) and siphosome (line of polyps) but no nectosome (propulsion medusae).
