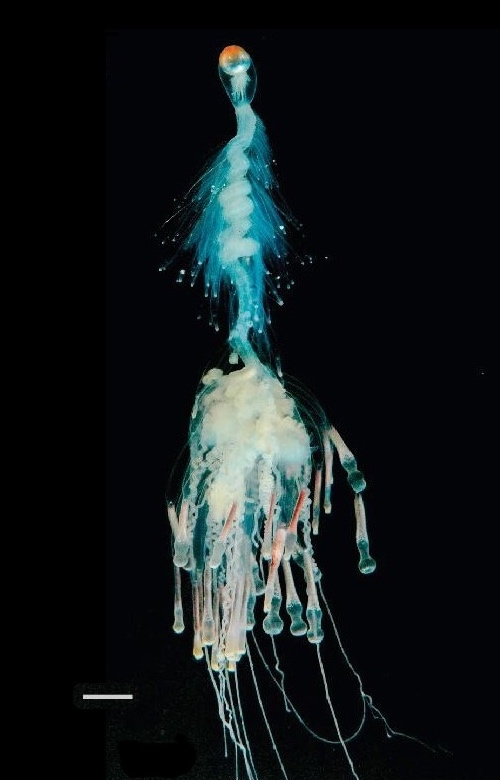

Scientific classification
- Kingdom: Animalia
- Phylum: Cnidaria
- Class: Hydrozoa
- Order: Siphonophorae
- Family: Rhizophysidae
- Genus: Bathyphysa
- Species: B. conifera

Binomial name
- Bathyphysa conifera (Studer, 1878)

Synonyms
- Bathyphysa grimaldi; Bathyphysa grimaldii Bedot 1893; Pterophysa grandis Fewkes 1886; Rhizophysa conifera Studer 1878

= Bathyphysa conifera =

Species of siphonophore sometimes called the flying spaghetti monster

Bathyphysa conifera, sometimes called the flying spaghetti monster, is a bathypelagic species of siphonophore in the family Rhizophysidae. Sightings have been documented all over the world, but it only officially lives in the North Atlantic Ocean, as far south as Gabon and as far north as France, the Gulf of Mexico, and the Caribbean Sea. Its common name comes from a satirical deity of the same name after its apparent resemblance.

It is a colonial species, having multiple zooids that together comprise a single unit. Each zooid has a specialized function; some help with feeding, some with swimming, reproduction, etc. Including its tentacles, it can reach several meters long. Their tentacles are lined with several nematocysts that provide a sting that defends against predators and helps hunt its prey. It is a carnivore, and, like other siphonophores, eats crustaceans and fish.

== Name ==
Bathyphysa conifera was nicknamed the Flying Spaghetti Monster, for the satirical deity of the Internet, by the oil workers who first saw it in 2015, citing an apparent resemblance. The specific name conifera, meaning 'cone-bearing', is due to the shape of the cluster of reproductive structures called gonophores. In Japanese it is called マガタマニラ / まがたまにら / 勾玉韮 magatamanira, "jewel leek". In Chinese, the nickname "Flying Spaghetti Monster" can be translated as 飞行面条怪兽 fēixíng miàntiáo guàishòu "flying noodles monster".

== Distribution ==
Bathyphysa conifera has been found throughout the northeast and northwest Atlantic Ocean, and in the South Atlantic off Angola. It has also been spotted in the Gulf of Mexico and off Curaçao, along with in Monterey Bay, California in the Pacific Ocean. It has also been documented in the Indian Ocean, Timor Sea, Savu Sea, Banda Sea, Seram Sea, Molucca Sea, Celebes Sea, Makassar Strait, Bali Sea, and off the Coast of Japan. It seems to most often be found in warmer temperatures, with the exclusion of the French sighting.

== Description ==
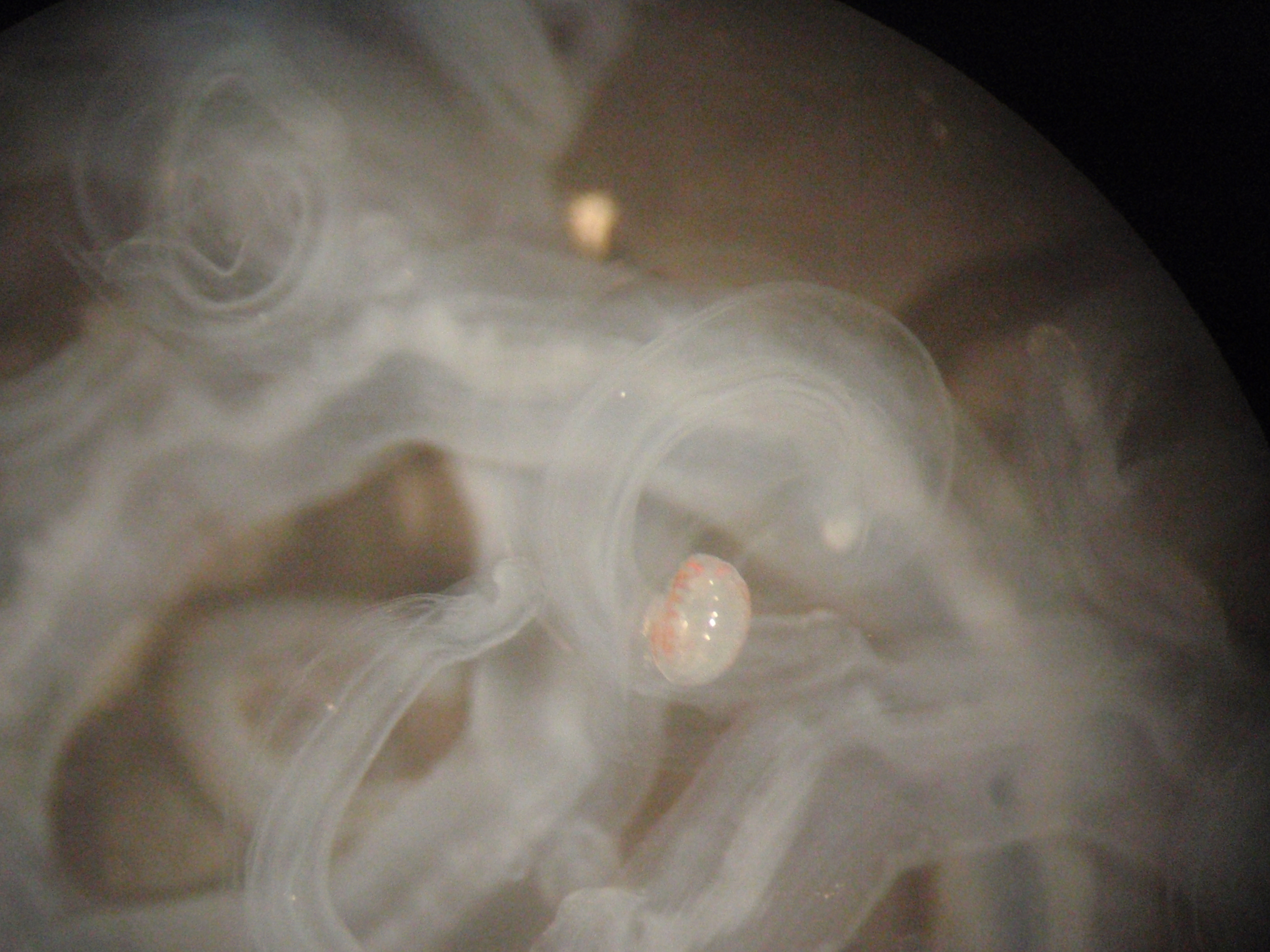
Close-up of B. conifera

Although B. conifera may appear to be an individual organism, each specimen is in fact a colonial organism composed of medusoid and polypoid zooids that are morphologically and functionally specialized. Zooids are multicellular units that develop from a single fertilized egg and combine to create functional colonies able to: reproduce, digest, float, and maintain body positioning.

It has a cystonect body plan, meaning it has a pneumatophore, or float, and siphosome, or line of polyps, but no nectosome, or propulsion medusae. Without that propulsion, B. conifera moves through contracting and relaxing the body stem. It differs from members of the genus Rhizophysa by the presence of ptera, or side "wings", on the young gastrozooids, or feeding polyps. It is distinct from other members of the genus Bathyphysa as its tentacles do not have any side branches, or tentilla. Tentilla are thought to be ancestral to siphonophores, and B. conifera likely lost the trait as did Apolemia. The tentacles have stinging cells called nematocysts that are haploneme, or uniform in thickness, and have a single size of isorhiza, or anchoring nematocysts.

The entire animal, including tentacles, is several meters long. The feeding polyps are pink when young, before developing tentacles. A mature feeding polyp is yellow with a single tentacle.

Colonies are unisexual, and reproduce by incomplete asexual reproduction. Not much more is known about B. conifera reproduction. Early development of cystonects is not known either. Siphonophores generally start life as a single-celled zygote, which divided and grows into a single polyp called a protozooid. The protozooid then divides by budding into all the zooids of the colony. The zooids are homologous to individual animals, but are connected physiologically to each other.

== Ecology ==
Like many siphonophores, it is carnivorous. The typical siphonophore diet consists of a variety of copepods, crustaceans, and fish of uncertain sizes. B. conifera has been observed eating a lanternfish.

A species of manefish in the genus Caristius associates apparently mutualistically with B. conifera, using it for shelter, stealing meals, and perhaps nibbling on its host as well, yet protecting it from amphipod parasites like Themisto.
