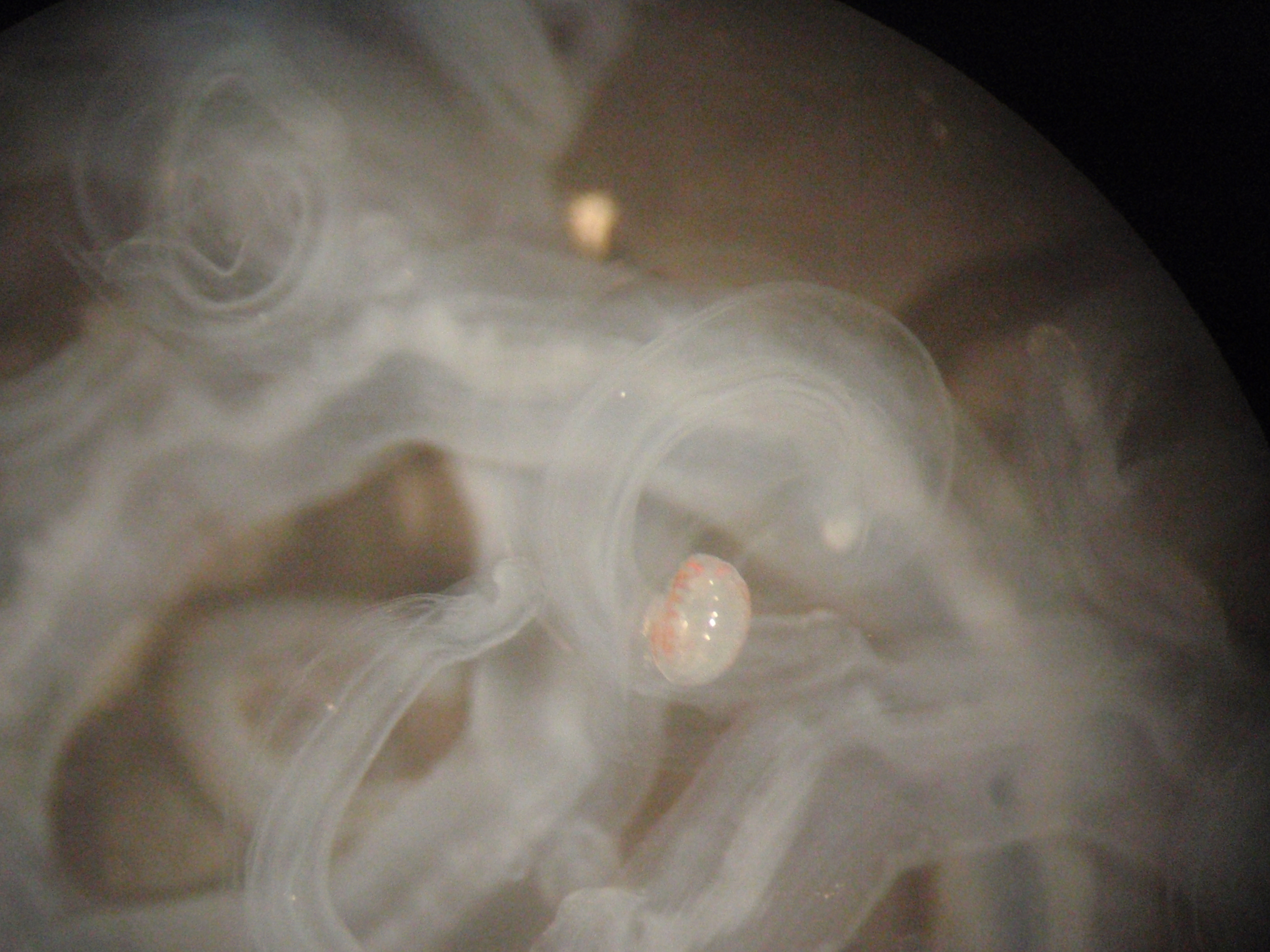
- Bathyphysa conifera

Scientific classification
- Kingdom: Animalia
- Phylum: Cnidaria
- Class: Hydrozoa
- Order: Siphonophorae
- Family: Rhizophysidae
- Genus: Bathyphysa; Studer, 1878

Species
- Bathyphysa conifera (Studer, 1878); Bathyphysa japonica Kawamura, 1943 (taxon inquirendum); Bathyphysa sibogae Lens & van Riemsdijk, 1908

Synonyms
- Pterophysa Fewkes, 1886

= Bathyphysa =

Genus of hydrozoans

Bathyphysa is a genus of hydrozoan siphonophores within the family Rhizophysidae. It has 3 species: Bathyphysa conifera, Bathyphysa Sibogae, and Bathyphysa japonica. This genus is composed of colonial organisms that consist of specialized zooids and are characterized by an elongated body, lack of swimming bells, and the presence of a gas filled float chamber (pneumatophore). The Bathyphysa species encompass the deep ocean waters and are primarily bathypelagic predators. They typically prey on zooplankton and nekton using tentacles that bear nematocysts for capturing purposes.

== Taxonomy ==
In 1878, marine biologist Théophile Rudolphe Studer first described the genus using samples of Bathyphysa conifera that had been wrapped around plumb lines. This discovery was followed by that of the Bathyphysa sibogae in 1908, through specimens collected on trawls during the Siboga expedition.

The Bathyphysa genus is included in the cystonect suborder, meaning organisms within it lack a nectosome and that zooids develop straight from the stem, as opposed to "pro-bud" development in calycophorae and physonectae. Within the Rhizophysidae family, Bathyphysa mainly differ from their relatives, Rhyzophysa, in that their gastrozooids develop wing-like ptera to increase surface area and buoyancy.

There is debate over whether the third species, Bathyphysa japonica, should be considered a valid group. Recent research suggests it has no distinct characteristics from other species in the genus.

== Morphology ==
Species belonging to the Bathyphysa genus are siphonophores composed of various zooids that serve to function together as a single organism. Similar to the members of the order Cystonectae, these colonies harbor a pneumatophore, a gas filled chamber that contributes to their buoyancy, which also bears different zooid types. These zooids each have their own respective roles in a siphonophores biology, including feeding and reproduction. A defining feature of siphonophore colony organization illustrates the high degree of specialization among zooids in their lineage.

Research on siphonophore morphology has examined feeding structures within the genus. For most siphonophores, prey is captured with tentilla, used to immobilize prey through the complex arrangements of nematocysts. However, studies on siphonophore tentilla evolution suggests that the Bathyphysa conifera lacks this specialized structure. The lack of this trait has been interpreted as an evolutionary loss within certain cystonect lineages and has been used in broader studies investigating the evolution of feeding morphology in siphonophores.

Studies of development in siphonophore colonies provide further insight into the more structural organization of the genus. Asexual budding along the colony stem, where zooid types emerge as the colony grows are how zooids produce. Feeding zooids (gastrozooids) and reproductive structures (gonodendra) arise through budding directly along the stem, contributing to the modular organization of the colony. This strategy of development allows siphonophore colonies to maintain a division of labor among zooids, maintaining unity and coordination.

== Habitat ==
There have been many sightings of Bathyphysa species since their discovery in 1908. Bathyphysa conifera have been found on trawls and nets in the Atlantic Ocean, the Gulf of Mexico, the Pacific Ocean, and the Indian Ocean, suggesting that they are distributed worldwide. They tend to be found below the surface in the bathypelagic zone, making sightings by submersible vehicles rare, and rendering it difficult to approximate their population.

Bathyphysa sibogae sightings aren't as well documented, although they have been collected within the upper 30 meters of the Sargasso Sea, and may be distributed closer to surface than conifera.

== Ecology ==
For the bathypelagic siphonophore species, they inhabit the deep, pelagic environment. Here, they function as gelatinous predators in midwater ecosystems. While they are usually found in deeper zones of the ocean, some species like the well studied Bathyphysa conifera, have been recorded in shallow waters. This illustrates some flexibility or evolution in vertical distribution they inhabit that can be influenced by environmental conditions or life stages.

Similar to most siphonophores, the Bathyphysa species are also composed of specialized zooids, characteristic of colonial organisms. These zooids are specialized for digestion and capturing prey. Tentillas are elongated tentacles that bear various nematocysts that paralyze prey upon contact and are very good prey capture tactics for zooplankton and small nekton.

The colonial organization characterized by division of labor among zooids enhances the feeding efficiency and survival in a nutrient limited deep sea environment. Research on the Bathyphysa sibogae show that some members of this genus contribute to trophic transfer by consuming pelagic organisms. Phylogenetic and developmental research studies show that this kind of specialization is key in ecological success and diversity of siphonophores in open ocean ecosystems.
