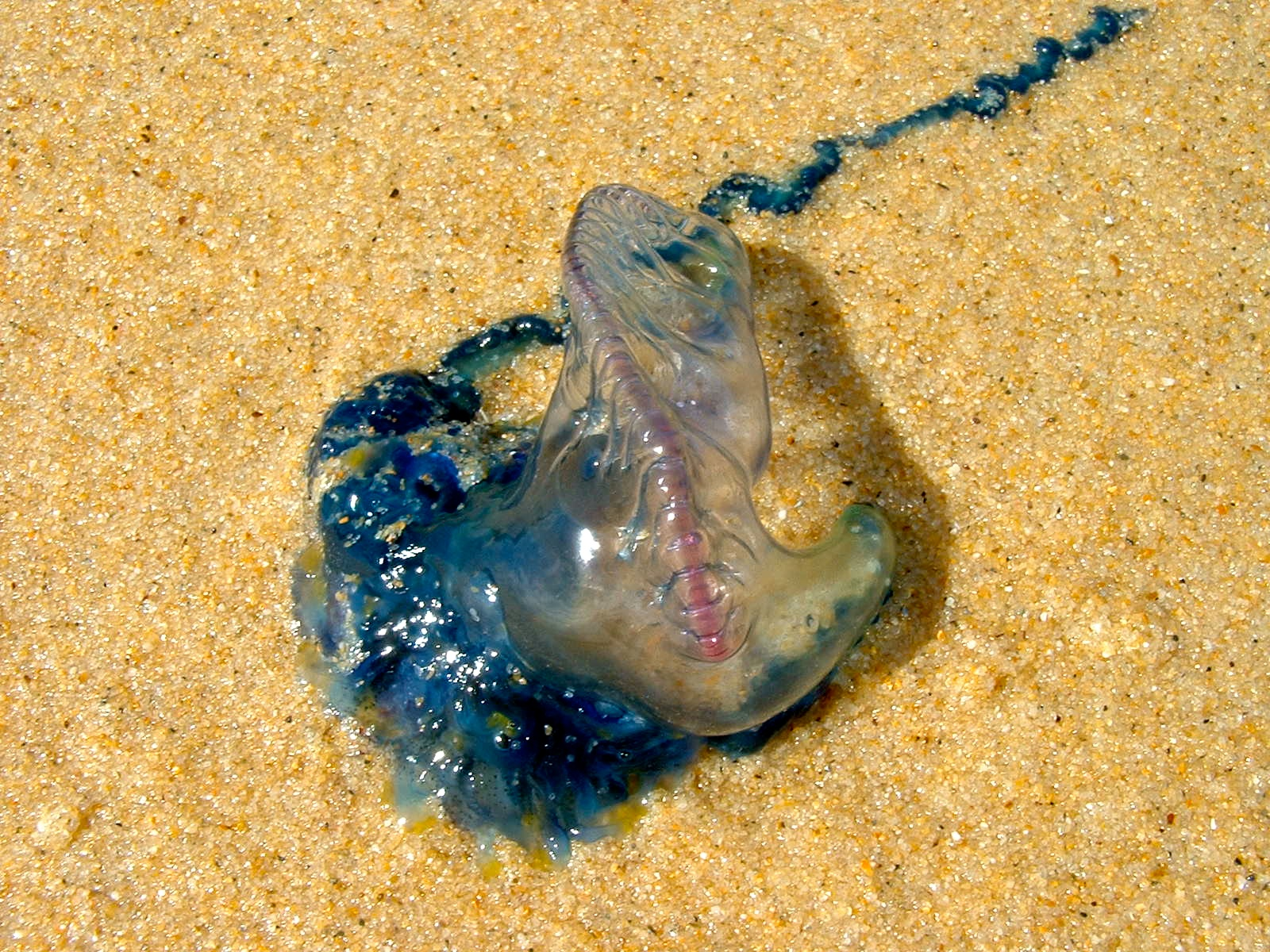
- A blue bottle washed ashore at a beach in Australia

Scientific classification
- Kingdom: Animalia
- Phylum: Cnidaria
- Class: Hydrozoa
- Order: Siphonophorae
- Family: Physaliidae
- Genus: Physalia
- Species: P. utriculus

Binomial name
- Physalia utriculus (Gmelin, 1788)

= Physalia utriculus =

Marine hydrozoan

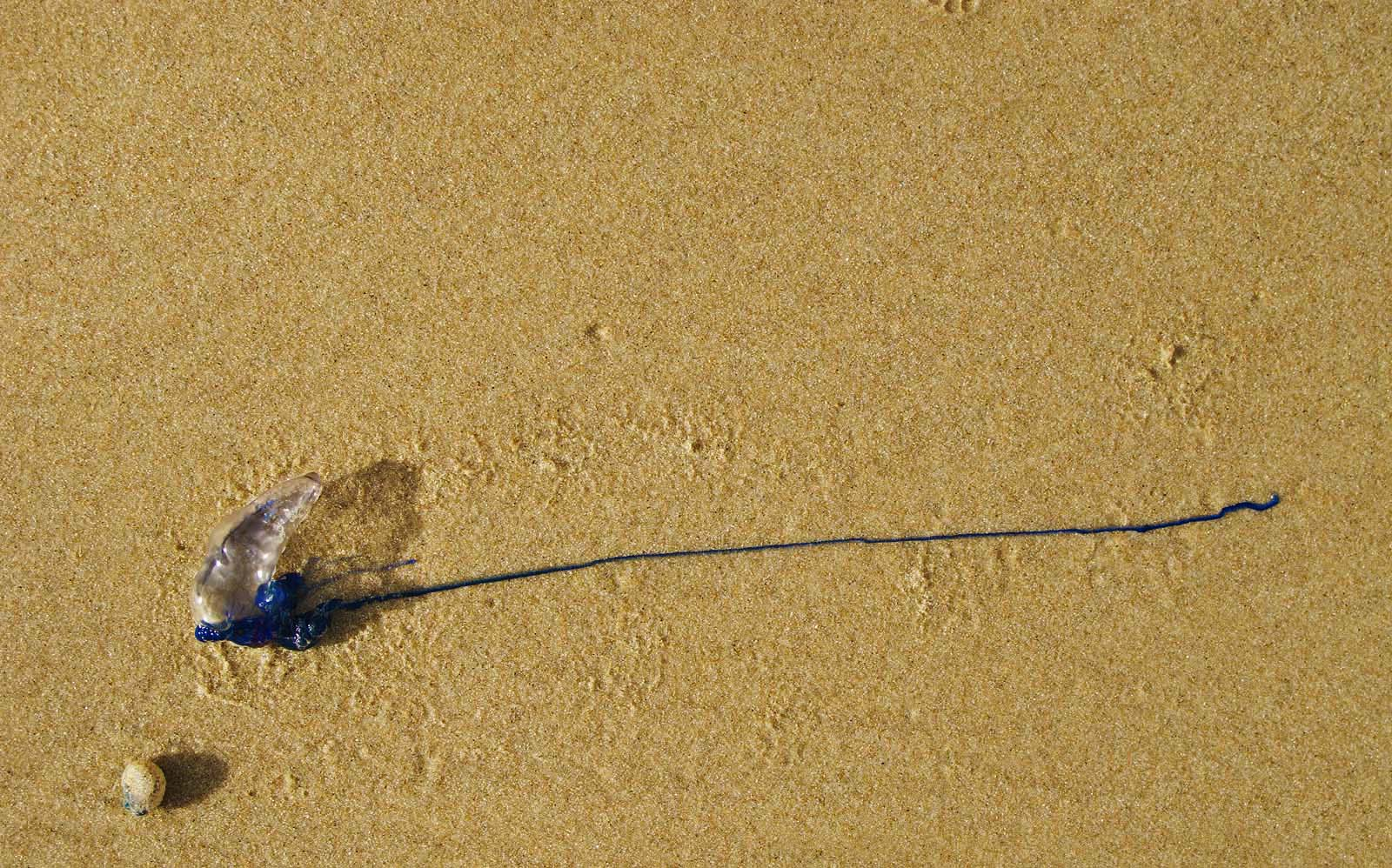
Stranded blue bottle with its typical blue tentacle

Physalia utriculus, also called bluebottle or Indo-Pacific Portuguese man o' war, is a marine hydrozoan of the order Siphonophorae found in the Indian, Atlantic, and Pacific Oceans. A gas-filled bladder allows it to float on the surface, propelled by currents, tides, and by a sail at the top of the bladder. A single long tentacle of venomous cnidocytes, hanging below the float, provides the animal with a means of capturing prey. They can cause painful injuries to humans when encountered at beaches, on which they are sometimes stranded in large numbers.

== Description ==
Like the Atlantic man o' war, Physalia physalis, the Indo-Pacific Portuguese species resembles a jellyfish but is a siphonophore, a composite of specialised organisms that function cooperatively. It is composed of four separate colonies of polyps and medusoids. The colony consists of a gas-filled polyp that keeps it afloat, and three other polyp types called the gastrozooids, gonozooids and dactylozooids. Dactylozooids form tentacles that hang below the water's surface and detect and attack prey, and drag the prey towards the gastrozooids for digestion. The gonozooids are adjacent to the gastrozooids and constitute the reproductive structures of the colony, dispersing eggs or sperm.

Physalia utriculus is distinguished from the Portuguese man o' war (Physalia physalis) by the smaller size of the float (six inches (16 cm) compared with twelve (30 cm)) and by having a single long fishing tentacle. Like its larger relative, P. utriculus often occurs in swarms.

== Distribution ==
Physalia utriculus is less widely distributed than the larger P. physalis, but it is the most common species on Australian coasts. It is also found in Hawaiian waters, where it is informally named ‘ili mane‘o or palalia.

== Hazards ==
Individuals of P. utriculus sometimes become stranded on beaches, where their toxic nematocysts can remain potent for weeks or months in moist conditions. P. utriculus is responsible for most of the reported injuries on Australian beaches. On the east coast of Australia 10,000 to 30,000 stings per year from animals of the genus Physalia are reported. Most of the incidents are on the eastern coast, with only 500 or so in western and southern waters. Eastern coastal areas exposed to strong winds from the northeast account for most 'armadas' becoming beached in summer months, southern and western coasts occur in winter. Unlike P. physalis, which has claimed the lives of three or more swimmers, no fatalities have been recorded for P. utriculus stings.

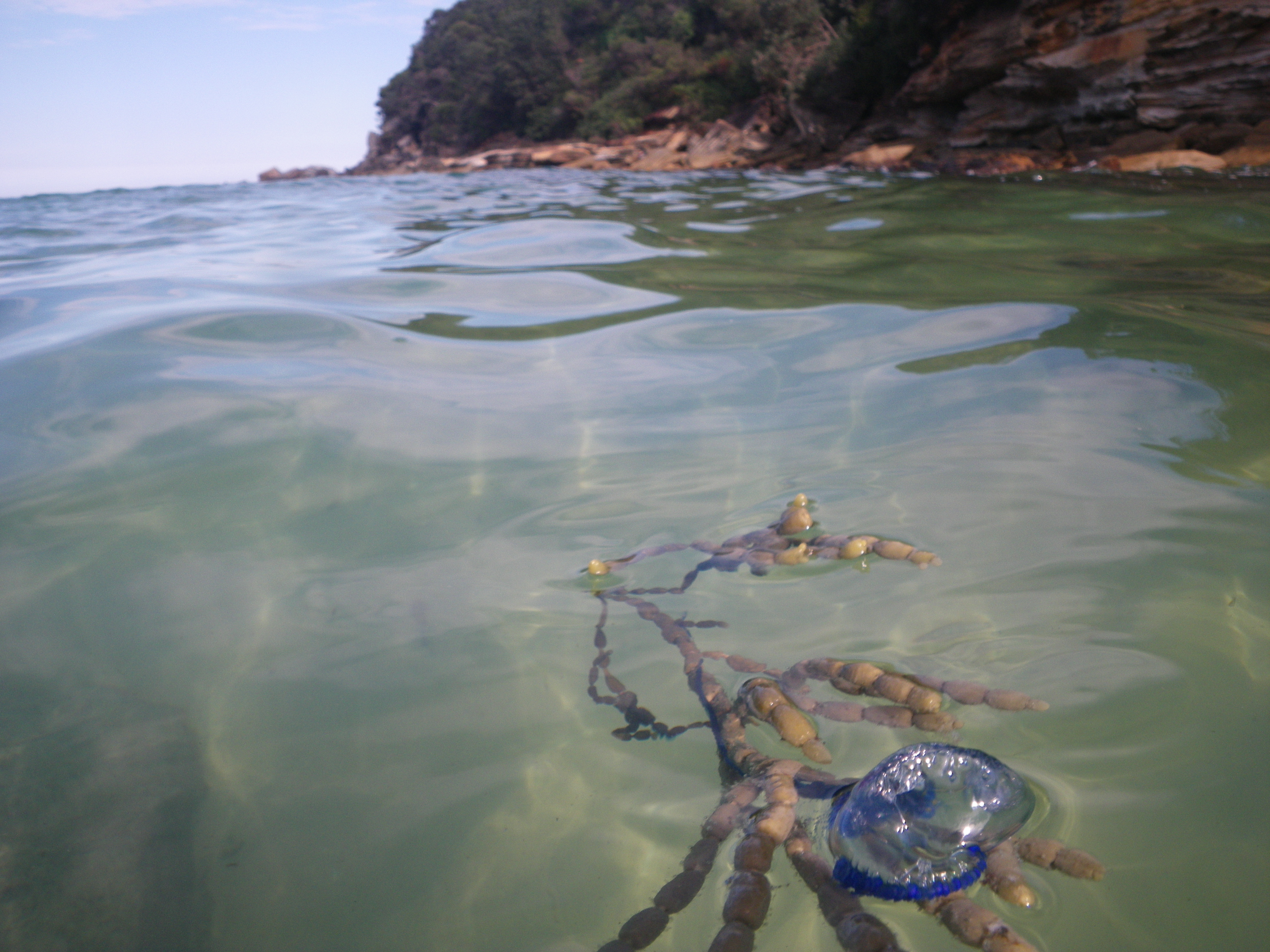
A bluebottle floating in Australia's eastern coastal waters (entangled with seaweed)

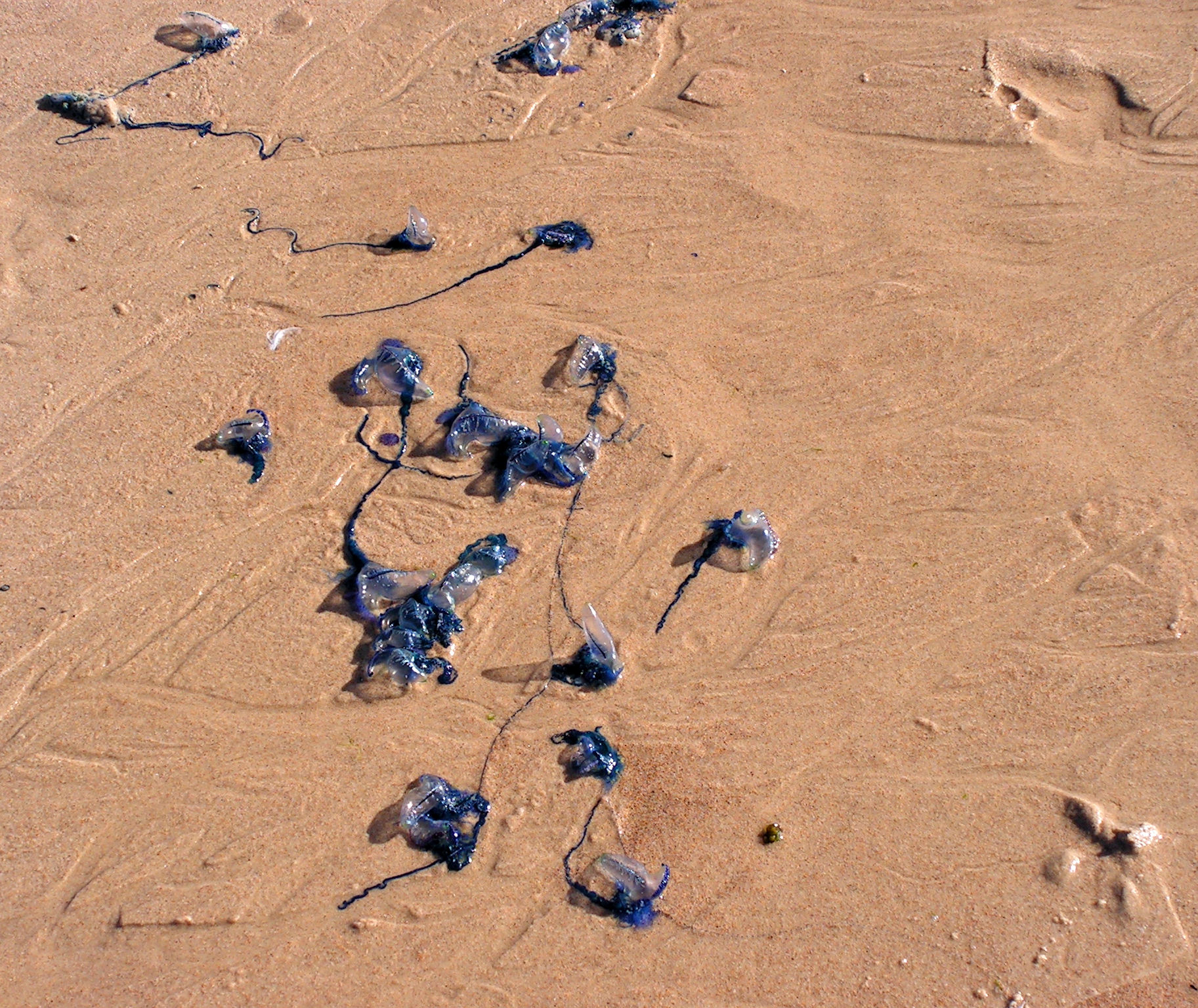
Washed ashore at Maroubra Beach, NSW, Australia
