= Physalia minuta =

Scientific classification
- Kingdom: Animalia
- Phylum: Cnidaria
- Class: Hydrozoa
- Order: Siphonophorae
- Family: Physaliidae
- Genus: Physalia
- Species: P. minuta

Binomial name
- Physalia minuta Church & Dunn in Church et al., 2025

Species of physalid siphonophore

Physalia minuta, also called little bluebottle, is a species of physalid siphonophore native to the oceanic waters around the Southern Hemisphere. Its longer pneumatophore distinguishes it from other species of its genus.

Though many systematists have treated its genus, Physalia, as containing a single species, Physalia physalis, the Portuguese man o' war, recent studies, morphological and genetic, have proven there to be upwards of four to five species in the genus, among them being Physalia minuta. Like all other man o' wars, Physalia minuta is a colonial organism, composed of many organized subunits called zooids; they are genetically indistinct and originate from the same egg.
