= Psenes sio =

Scientific classification
- Domain: Eukaryota
- Kingdom: Animalia
- Phylum: Chordata
- Class: Actinopterygii
- Order: Scombriformes
- Family: Nomeidae
- Genus: Psenes
- Species: P. sio

Binomial name
- Psenes sio Haedrich, 1970

Species of ray-finned fish

Psenes sio is a species of scombriform ray-finned fish in the family Nomeidae (driftfishes).
