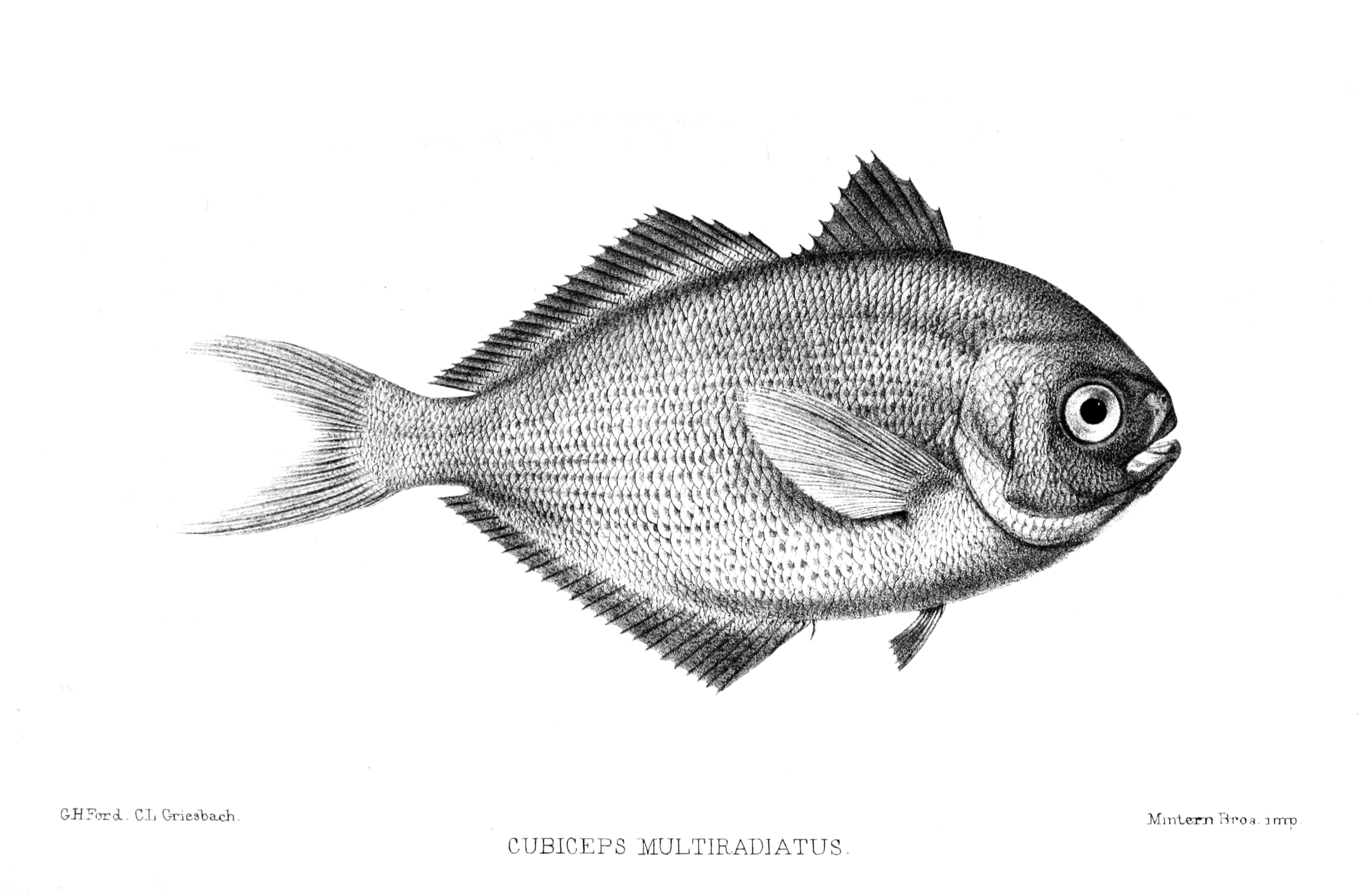

Scientific classification
- Kingdom: Animalia
- Phylum: Chordata
- Class: Actinopterygii
- Order: Scombriformes
- Family: Nomeidae
- Genus: Psenes
- Species: P. cyanophrys

Binomial name
- Psenes cyanophrys Valenciennes, 1833

= Psenes cyanophrys =

Species of ray-finned fish

Psenes cyanophrys of freckled driftfish is a species of scombriform ray-finned fish in the family Nomeidae (driftfishes).
