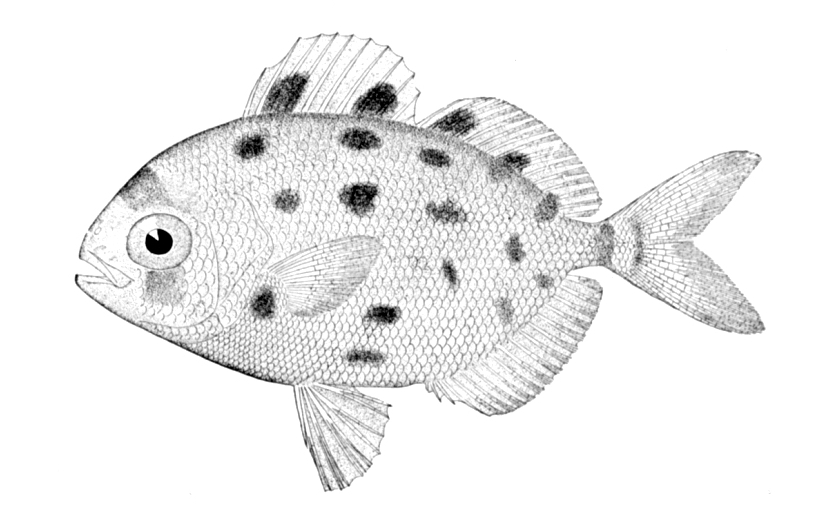
- Silver Driftfish (P. maculatus)

Scientific classification
- Domain: Eukaryota
- Kingdom: Animalia
- Phylum: Chordata
- Class: Actinopterygii
- Order: Scombriformes
- Family: Nomeidae
- Genus: Psenes; Valenciennes, 1833

Type species
- Psenes cyanophrys Valenciennes, 1833

Synonyms
- Icticus Jordan & Thompson, 1914; Papyrichthys J. L. B. Smith, 1934; Thecopsenes Fowler, 1944; Caristioides Whitley, 1948; Parapsenes J. L. B. Smith, 1949; Alepidichthys Torres-Orozco & Castro-Aguirre, 1983

= Psenes =

Psenes Temporal range: Early Oligocene to Present

Genus of ray-finned fishes

Psenes is a genus of driftfishes native to the Indian, Atlantic and Pacific oceans.

== Species ==
There are currently six recognized species in this genus:

- Psenes arafurensis Günther, 1889 (Banded driftfish)
- Psenes cyanophrys Valenciennes, 1833 (Freckled driftfish)
- Psenes hillii Ogilby, 1915
- Psenes maculatus Lütken, 1880 (Silver driftfish)
- Psenes pellucidus Lütken, 1880 (Bluefin driftfish)
- Psenes sio Haedrich, 1970 (Twospine driftfish)
