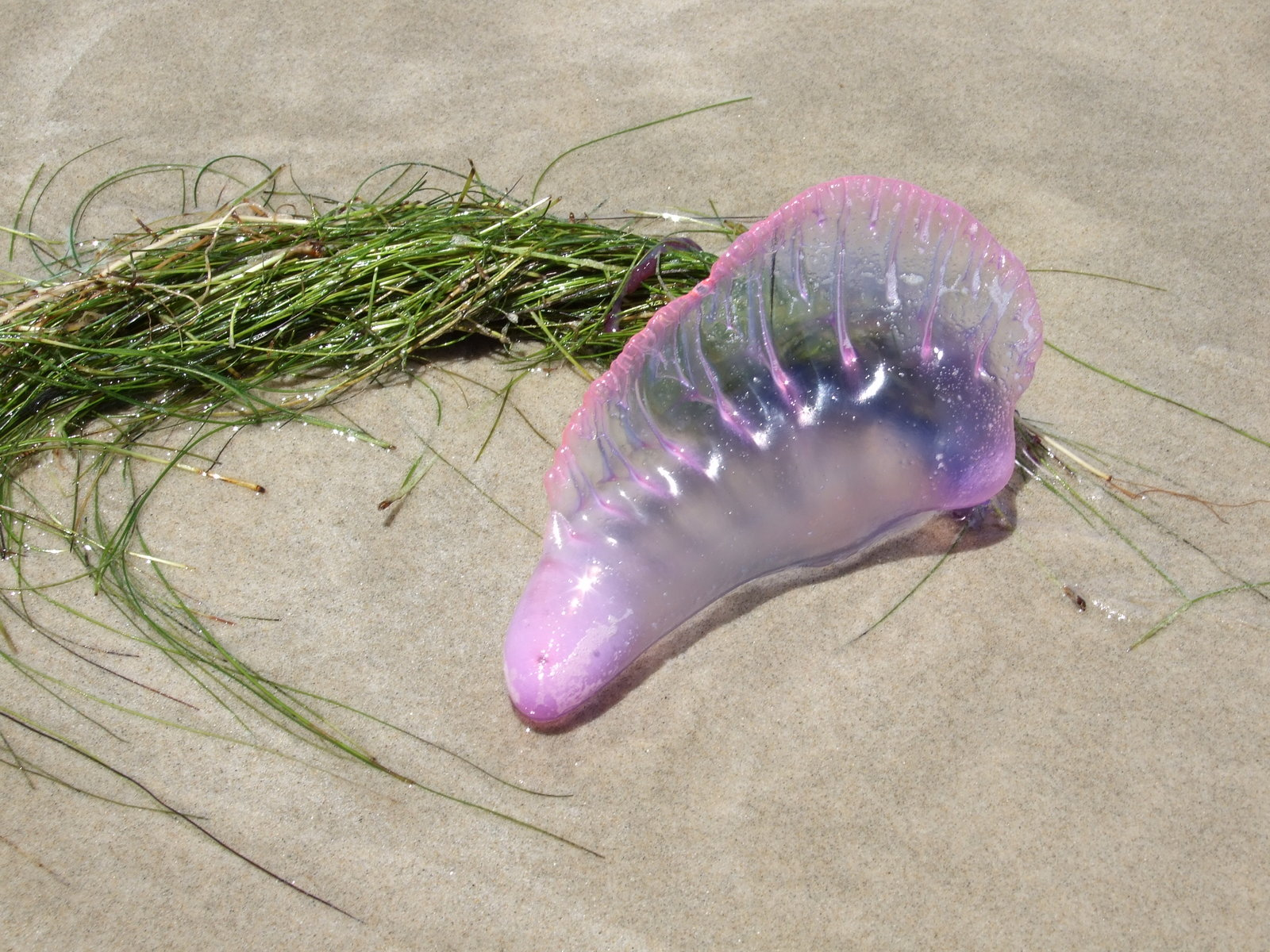
- Physalia physalis, the Atlantic Portuguese man o' war

Scientific classification
- Kingdom: Animalia
- Phylum: Cnidaria
- Class: Hydrozoa
- Order: Siphonophorae
- Suborder: Cystonectae
- Family: Physaliidae; Brandt, 1835
- Genus: Physalia; Lamarck, 1801

Type species
- Physalia physalis (Linnaeus, 1758)

Species
- 5, see text

Synonyms
- List: Family synonymy; Physalidae Brandt, 1835 (original spelling) Genus synonymy; Arethusa Oken, 1815; Physalis Tilesius, 1810

= Physalia =

Genus of marine hydrozoans

Physalia is a genus of hydrozoan cnidarians within the monotypic family Physaliidae, commonly known as man o' wars or bluebottles. They are siphonophores, colonial organisms composed of specialized individual zooids that function together as a single unit. Unlike most siphonophores, which are planktonic, Physalia species are neustonic, living at the ocean-air interface.

== Taxonomy and systematics ==
The genus Physalia was established by Jean-Baptiste Lamarck in 1801. The type species, the Atlantic Portuguese man o' war, was first described by Carl Linnaeus in 1758 as Holothuria physalis.

For much of the 20th and early 21st centuries, the genus was often considered monotypic, containing only P. physalis, with other observed forms considered regional variants or growth stages. However, morphological studies noted significant variation, and genetic analyses have since provided strong evidence for multiple, reproductively isolated species.

A pivotal 2025 population genomics study of specimens collected globally identified five distinct genetic lineages, supporting the recognition of at least four species. This study integrated whole-genome sequencing with morphological analysis of thousands of citizen-science images from iNaturalist, linking genetic clusters to recognizable morphologies. It confirmed the validity of historically proposed species like P. utriculus and P. megalista, and described the new species P. minuta.

Also in 2025, Physalia mikazuki was described from Japan based on distinct morphology and mitochondrial DNA sequences.

Physalia is the sole genus in the family Physaliidae, within the siphonophore suborder Cystonectae. Cystonectae represents the earliest-diverging lineage of siphonophores.

== Species ==
The genus currently contains five recognized species:

Image	Common name	Scientific name	Description / Distinguishing features	Distribution
	Portuguese man o' war	Physalia physalis (Linnaeus, 1758)	Largest species; long, multiple tentacle clusters; tall sail crest.	Atlantic Ocean
	Indo-Pacific man o' war Bluebottle	Physalia utriculus (Gmelin, 1788)	Smaller float; often a single long fishing tentacle; shorter sail.	Indo-Pacific
	Southern man o' war	Physalia megalista Lesueur & Petit, 1807	Long, slender pneumatophore.	Southern Hemisphere
	Little bluebottle	Physalia minuta Church & Dunn, 2025	Small, green-tinted float; short sail; short tentacles.	Southwest Pacific.
	Crescent Helmet man o' war	Physalia mikazuki Yongstar, Ochiai & Ames, 2025	Crescent-moon shaped float (diagnostic).	Northwestern Pacific (Japan), Pakistan, and Mexico
