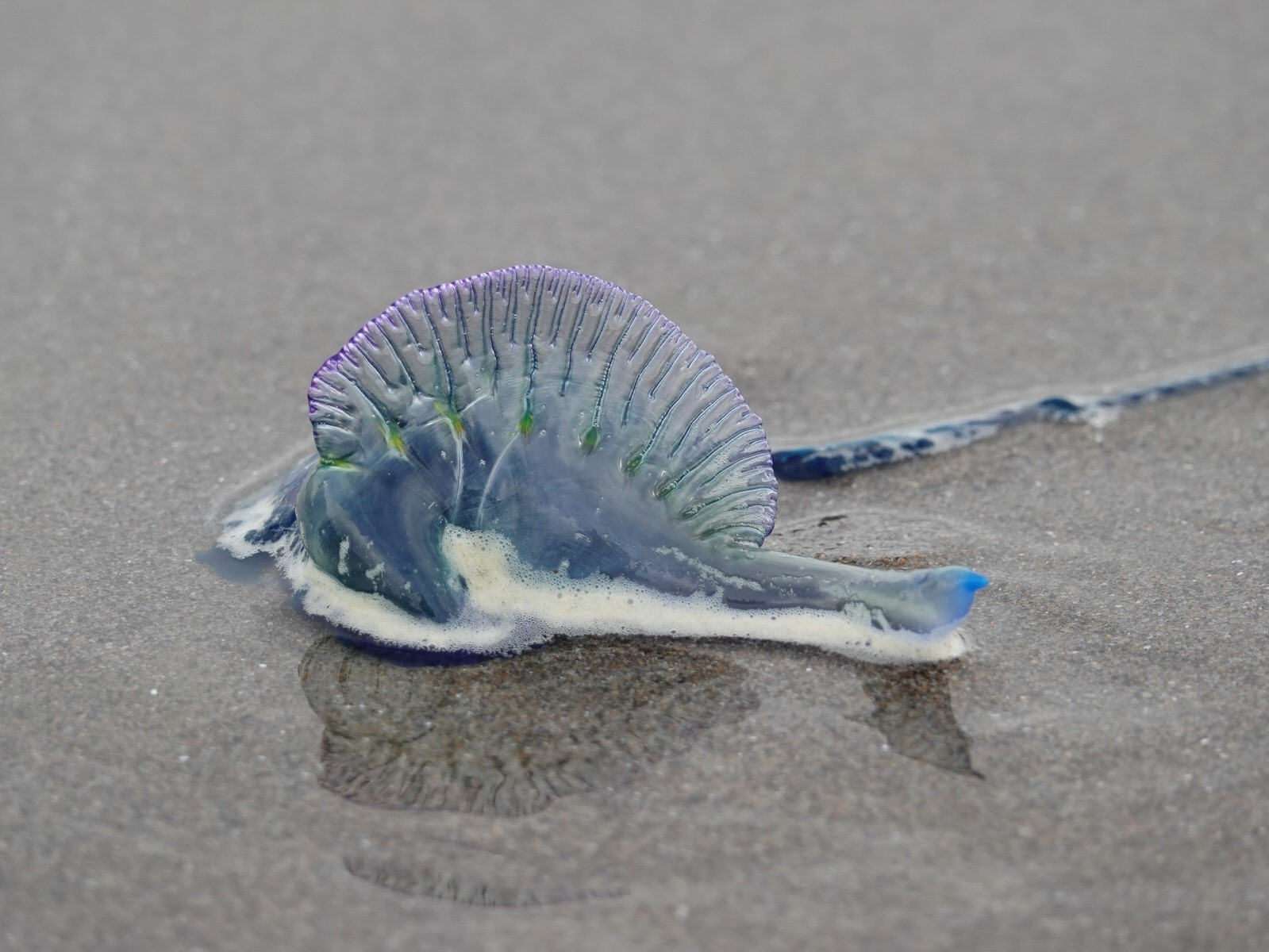
- Physalia megalista at Piha beach, Auckland, New Zealand

Scientific classification
- Kingdom: Animalia
- Phylum: Cnidaria
- Class: Hydrozoa
- Order: Siphonophorae
- Family: Physaliidae
- Genus: Physalia
- Species: P. megalista

Binomial name
- Physalia megalista Lesueur and Petit, 1807

= Physalia megalista =

Species of marine cnidarian

Physalia megalista is a marine hydrozoan found in the Atlantic, Indian, and Pacific oceans.

== Taxonomy ==
In the 20th century, P. megalista was considered a synonym of P. physalis. However, Gershwin et al. (2010) synonymized megalista with P. utriculus. A 2024 study using specimens from around the world identified P. megalista (with a long and slender pneumatophore as a distinct species, further noting that the neotype designation for P. megalista was invalid.
