= Bathyphysa sibogae =

Scientific classification
- Kingdom: Animalia
- Phylum: Cnidaria
- Class: Hydrozoa
- Order: Siphonophorae
- Family: Rhizophysidae
- Genus: Bathyphysa
- Species: B. sibogae

Binomial name
- Bathyphysa sibogae Lens & van Riemsdijk, 1908

Species of siphonophore

Bathyphysa sibogae is a rare species of siphonophore in the family Rhizophysidae. It is found at a depth of 500 to 2000 meters deep in the Atlantic Ocean.

== Description ==
The longest specimen of B. sibogae was 72 cm in length, its pneumatophore 9 mm long and 4 mm wide. Porus is visible but without pigmentation. Siphons attain a length of 10-30 mm. In the 21st group, a 13 mm tentacle with tentilla at the base of the siphon is noticeable.

The siphonophore hangs vertically in the water, stem below the pneumatophore and tentacles trailing behind. It does not swim by contraction of the ptera.

An amphipod, Schizoscelus ornatus, is known to be associated with colonies.
