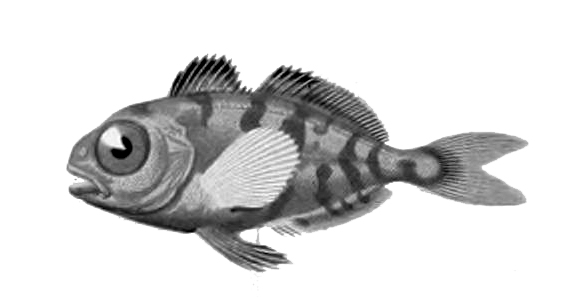

Conservation status
- Least Concern (IUCN 3.1)

Scientific classification
- Kingdom: Animalia
- Phylum: Chordata
- Class: Actinopterygii
- Order: Scombriformes
- Family: Nomeidae
- Genus: Psenes
- Species: P. maculatus

Binomial name
- Psenes maculatus Lütken, 1880

= Psenes maculatus =

Species of ray-finned fish

Psenes maculatus is a species of marine ray-finned fish of the order Scombriformes in the family Nomeidae (driftfishes).
