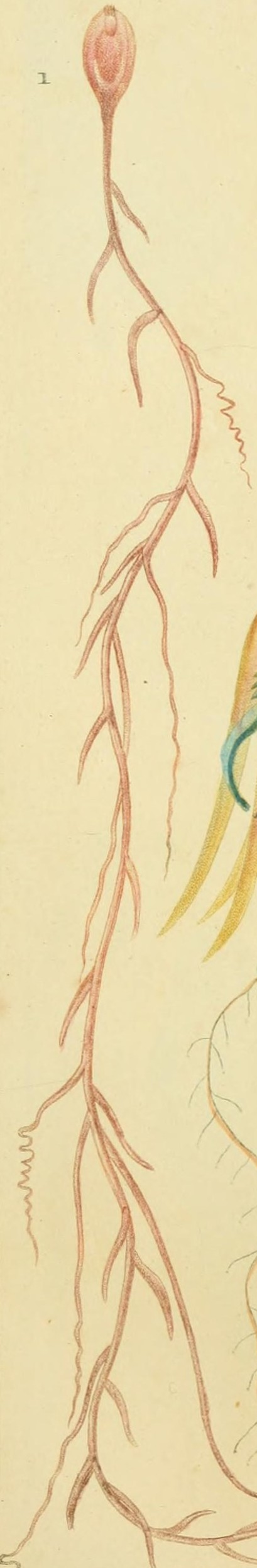
- Illustration of Rhizophysa filiformis

Scientific classification
- Kingdom: Animalia
- Phylum: Cnidaria
- Class: Hydrozoa
- Order: Siphonophorae
- Suborder: Cystonectae
- Family: Rhizophysidae; Brandt, 1835

Genera and species
- Bathyphysa Studer, 1878; Bathyphysa conifera (Studer, 1878); Bathyphysa sibogae Lens & van Riemsdijk, 1908; Bathyphysa japonica Kawamura, 1943 (taxon inquirendum); Epibulia Eschscholtz, 1829 (taxon inquirendum); Epibulia ritteriana Haeckel, 1888 (taxon inquirendum); Epibulia (Brachysoma) Brandt, 1835 (nomen dubium); Epibulia erythrophysa Brandt, 1835 (nomen dubium); Rhizophysa Péron & Lesueur, 1807; Rhizophysa chamissonis Eysenhardt, 1821 (taxon inquirendum); Rhizophysa eysenhardtii Gegenbaur, 1859; Rhizophysa filiformis (Forsskål, 1775); Rhizophysa uvaria Fewkes, 1886 (taxon inquirendum)

= Rhizophysidae =

Family of hydrozoans

Rhizophysidae is a family of siphonophores in the suborder Cystonectae. It includes Bathyphysa conifera, sometimes called the "flying spaghetti monster".

In Japanese, the family is called ボウズニラ (bouzunira).
