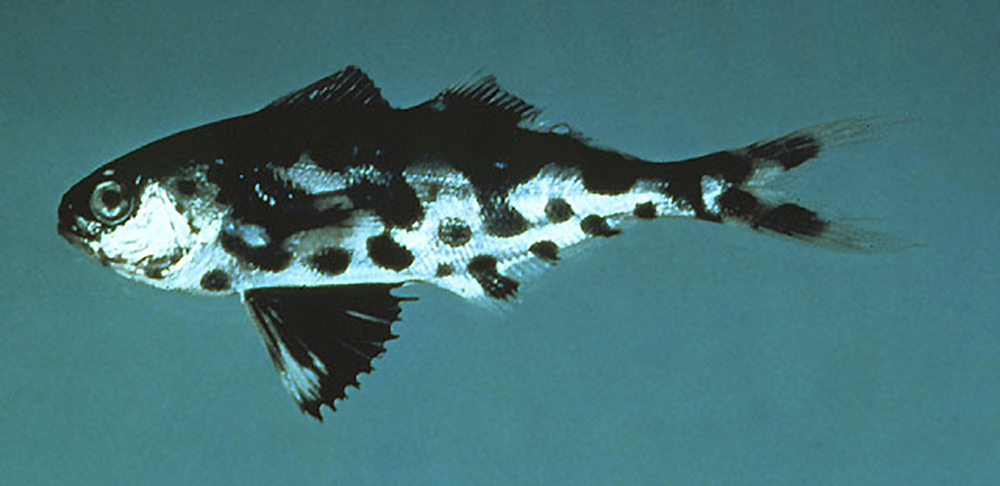

Conservation status
- Least Concern (IUCN 3.1)

Scientific classification
- Kingdom: Animalia
- Phylum: Chordata
- Class: Actinopterygii
- Order: Scombriformes
- Family: Nomeidae
- Genus: Nomeus; G. Cuvier, 1816
- Species: N. gronovii

Binomial name
- Nomeus gronovii (J. F. Gmelin, 1789)

Synonyms
- Gobius albula Meuschen, 1781 (ambiguous); Gobius gronovii J. F. Gmelin, 1789; Eleotris mauritii Bloch & Schneider, 1801; Nomeus mauritii (Bloch & J. G. Schneider, 1801); Nomeus maculosus Bennett, 1831; Nomeus peronii Valenciennes, 1833; Nomeus maculatus Valenciennes, 1840; Nomeus oxyurus Poey, 1860; Nomeus dyscritus Whitley, 1931

= Man-of-war fish =

Species of fish

Nomeus gronovii, the man-of-war fish or bluebottle fish, is a species of fish in the family Nomeidae, the driftfish. It is a distinct species characterized by an elongated body, large eyes, and blackish-blue stripes, growing up to 39 cm long. Inhabiting warm, deep pelagic zones of the Atlantic, Pacific, and Indian Oceans between 200 and 1,000 meters deep, this fish lives within the tentacles of the Portuguese man o' war, feeding on its tentacles and gonads. Although it possesses resistance to the toxin produced by the man o' war, this species actively avoids larger tentacles and occasionally feeds on smaller ones. The species' agility, high vertebrae count, and specialized skin features contribute to its toxin avoidance. It is the sole known species in its genus and undergoes a lifestyle shift from pelagic to demersal as it matures. Reproduction involves egg release by females, yielding larvae adapted to open water life, with each female capable of producing 100 to 1000 offspring.

== Description ==
The fish has an elongate body with large eyes, distinct dorsal fins, and is striped with blackish-blue blemishes covering its body, and the caudal fin is extremely forked. It can reach a length of 39 cm (15 in). They form large groups rather than being solitary and can live up to five years. This species is from the Atlantic, Pacific, and Indian Oceans, typically living in warm, deep pelagic zones between 200 and 1,000 meters (660 and 3,280 feet) in the open ocean. It is more common in the Pacific and Indian Oceans but less so in the eastern Atlantic. It is a carnivore/planktivore and is notable for its ability to live within the deadly tentacles of a siphonophore, the Portuguese man o' war, upon whose tentacles and gonads it feeds. It is of minor importance to commercial fisheries. This species is the only known member of its genus.

== Toxin avoidance ==
The fish is known to live within the dangerous tentacles of the Portuguese man-o'-war. Rather than using mucus to prevent nematocysts from firing, as is seen in some of the clownfish sheltering among sea anemones, the fish appears to use highly agile swimming to physically avoid tentacles.

The fish has a very high number of vertebrae (41), which may add to its agility and primarily uses its pectoral fins for swimming—a feature of fish that specialize in maneuvering tight spaces. It also has a complex skin design and at least one antigen to the man o' war's toxin. Despite its apparent tenfold greater resistance to the toxin compared to other fish, this species can still be stung by the dactylozooides (large tentacles), which it actively avoids. The smaller gonozooids do not seem to sting the fish and the fish is reported to frequently "nibble" on these tentacles.

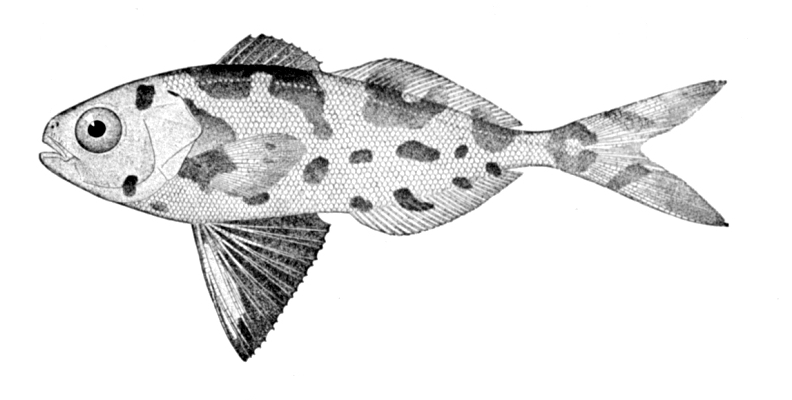
Man-of-war fish (Nomeus gronovii)

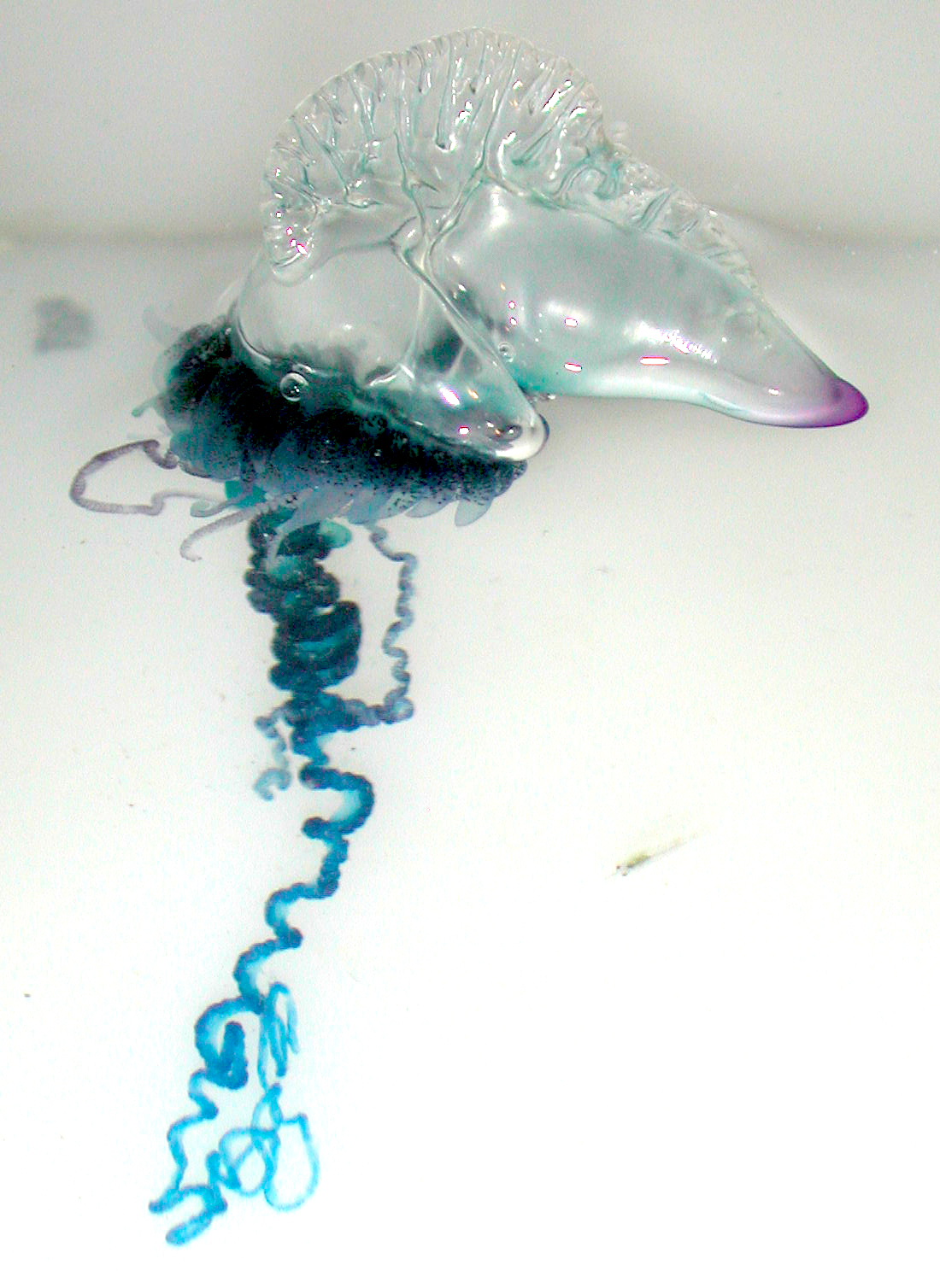
Portuguese man o' war (Physalia physalis)

== Naming ==
The specific name honours the Dutch zoologist Laurentius Theodorus Gronovius (1730–1777). Its name refers to the juvenile phase where they tend to be pelagic and swim next to the man of war. As they mature they become demersal, living close to the ocean floor.

== Reproduction ==
The man-of-war fish reproduces by releasing eggs from the female, subsequently fertilized. These eggs, along with the ensuing larvae, are specialized to thrive in open water. Generally, these fish can yield anywhere between 100 and 1000 offspring, with the fertilized eggs hatching within 4–5 days.

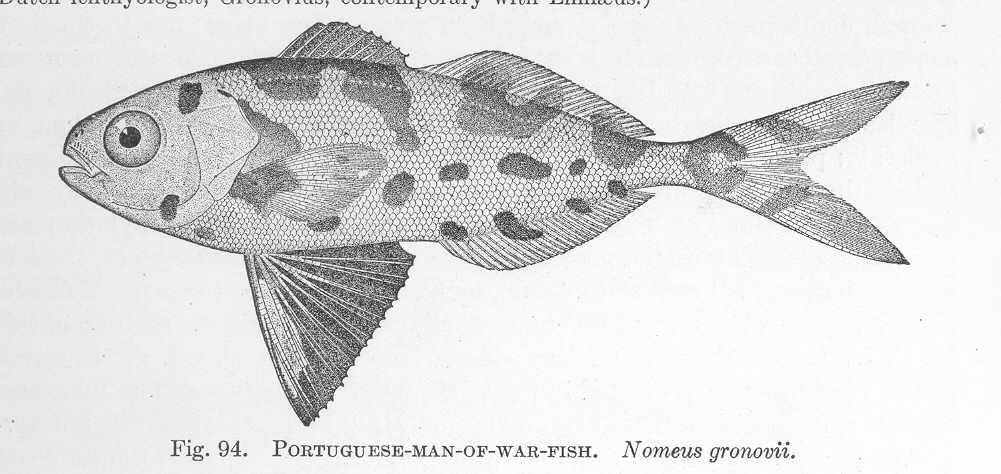

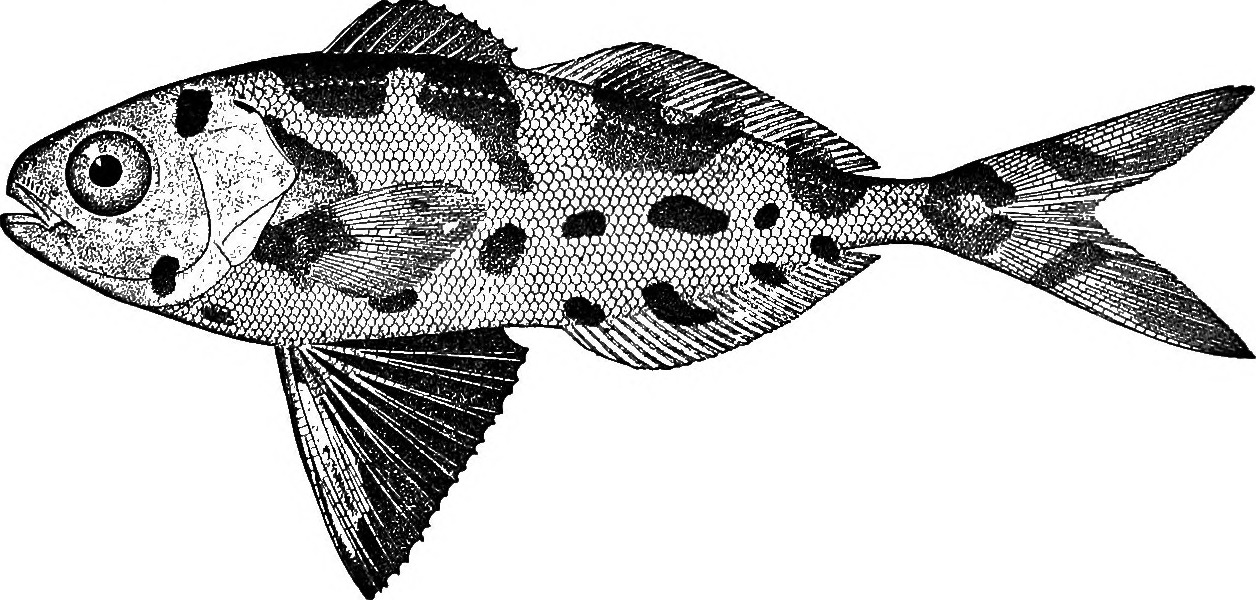

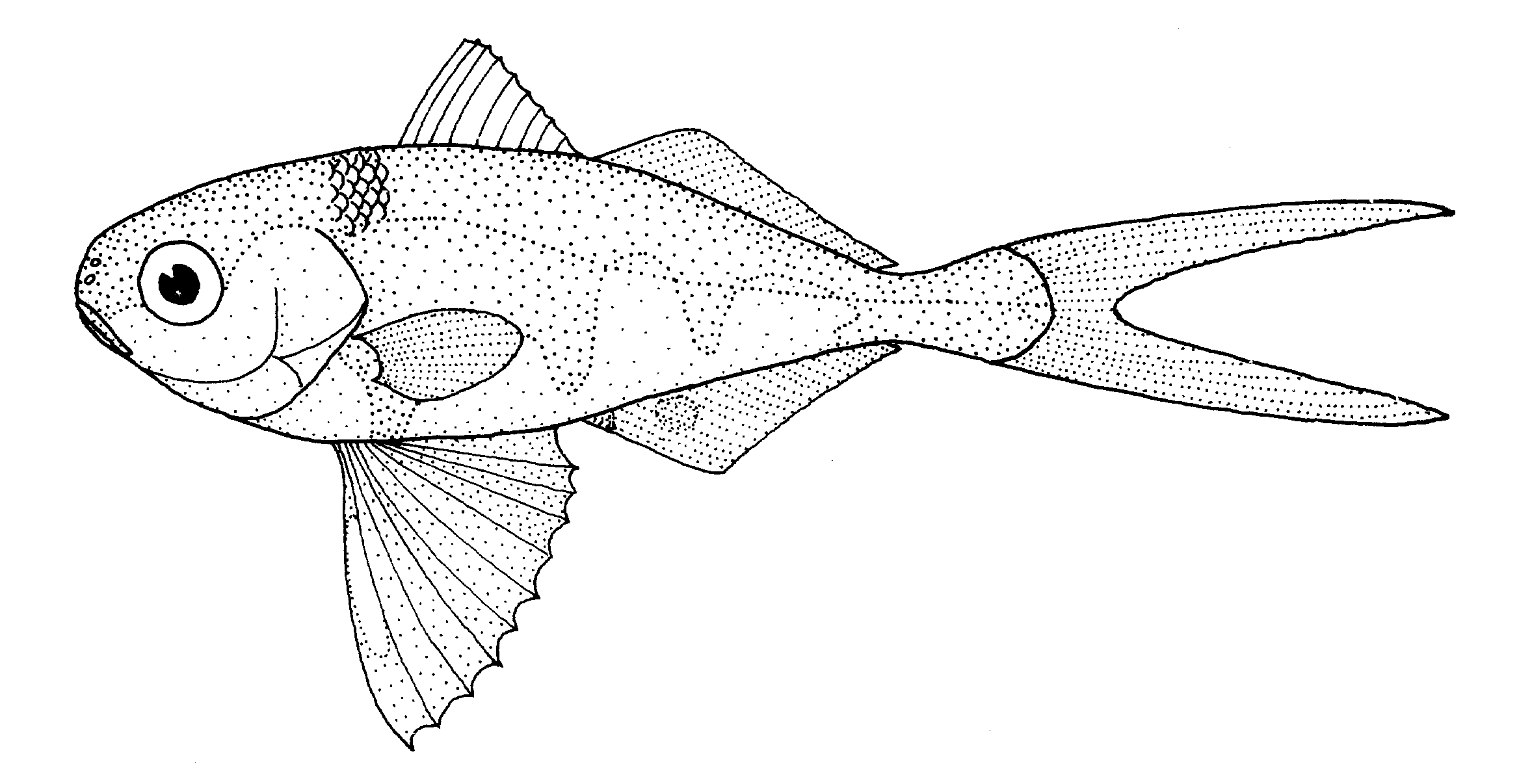
