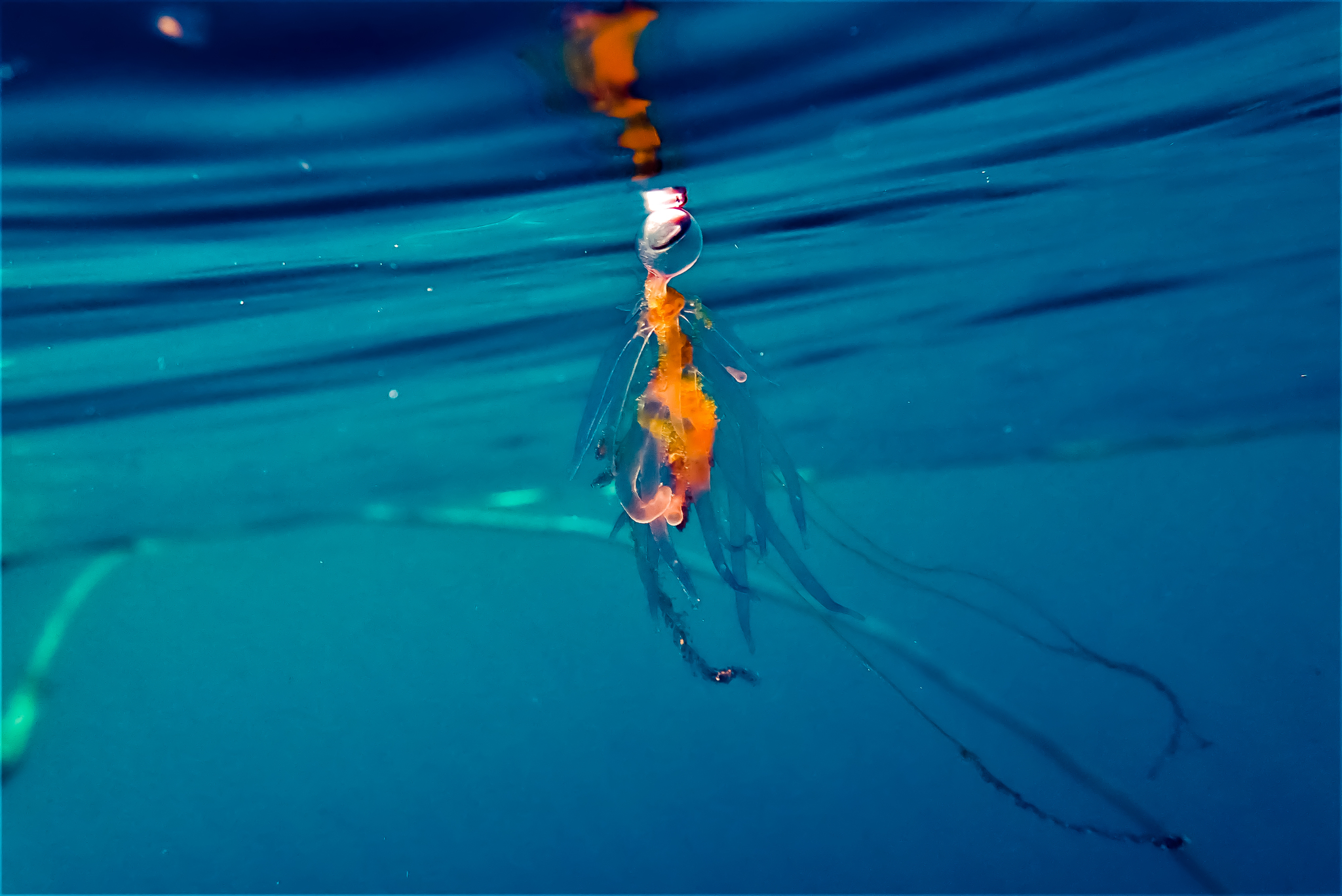

Scientific classification
- Domain: Eukaryota
- Kingdom: Animalia
- Phylum: Cnidaria
- Class: Hydrozoa
- Order: Siphonophorae
- Family: Rhizophysidae
- Genus: Rhizophysa
- Species: R. filiformis

Binomial name
- Rhizophysa filiformis (Forsskål, 1775)

Synonyms
- List: Epibulia (Macrosoma) mertensii Brandt, 1835; Galeolaria filiformis (Forsskål, 1775); Physsophora filiformis Forsskål, 1775; Pneumophysa gegenbauri Haeckel, 1888; Pneumophysa mertensii (Brandt, 1835); Rhizophysa planestoma Péron & Lesueur, 1807

= Rhizophysa filiformis =

Species of siphonophore

Rhizophysa filiformis is a species of siphonophore, a group of colonial marine organisms that are closely related to jellyfish. It belongs to the family Rhizophysidae.

== Habitat and distribution ==
This species is pelagic and occurs in the western Atlantic.
