= Epibulia =

Scientific classification
- Domain: Eukaryota
- Kingdom: Animalia
- Phylum: Cnidaria
- Class: Hydrozoa
- Order: Siphonophorae
- Family: Rhizophysidae
- Genus: Epibulia; Eschscholtz, 1829

Genus of hydrozoans

Epibulia is a genus of hydrozoans belonging to the family Rhizophysidae.

The species of this genus are found in Northern America.

Species:

- Epibulia erythrophysa Brandt, 1835
- Epibulia ritteriana Haeckel, 1888
