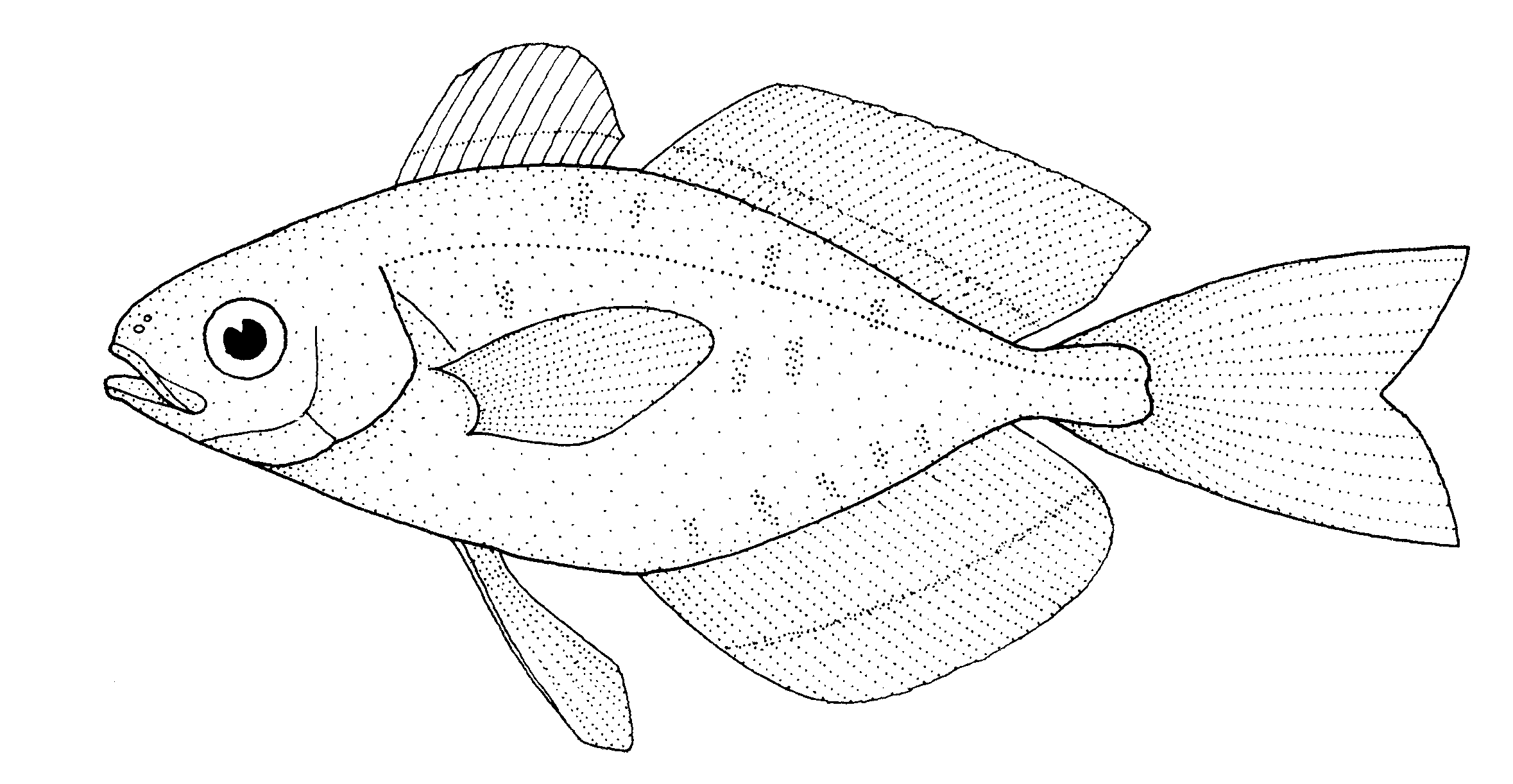
- Drawing by Dr Tony Ayling

Conservation status
- Least Concern (IUCN 3.1)

Scientific classification
- Kingdom: Animalia
- Phylum: Chordata
- Class: Actinopterygii
- Order: Scombriformes
- Family: Nomeidae
- Genus: Psenes
- Species: P. pellucidus

Binomial name
- Psenes pellucidus Lütken, 1880

Synonyms
- Papyrichthys pellucidus (Lütken, 1880); Psenes edwardsii C. H. Eigenmann, 1901; Icticus ischanus Jordan & Thompson, 1914; Caristioides amplipinnis Whitley, 1948; Cubiceps ismaelensis Dieuzeide & Roland, 1955; Cubiceps niger Nümann, 1958

= Bluefin driftfish =

Species of ray-finned fish

Psenes pellucidus, the bluefin driftfish, is a species of driftfish native to the Atlantic, Indian, and Pacific oceans where it is found in deep waters to a depth of 1000 m. It is also present in low abundance since the mid-20th century in the western Mediterranean Sea which it most likely entered via the Strait of Gibraltar. It can reach a length of 80 cm TL.
