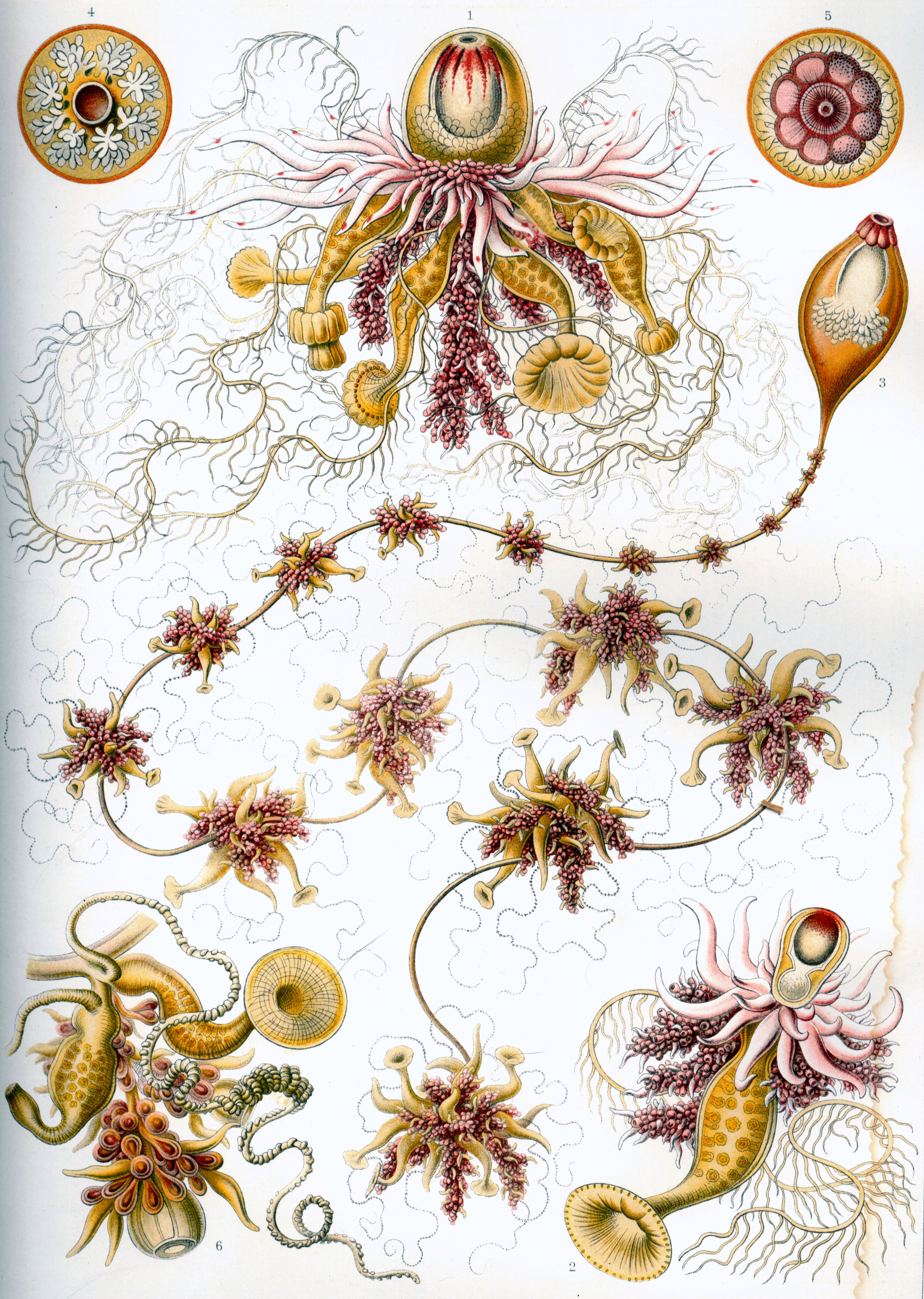
- A few species from the Rhizophysa genus

Scientific classification
- Domain: Eukaryota
- Kingdom: Animalia
- Phylum: Cnidaria
- Class: Hydrozoa
- Order: Siphonophorae
- Family: Rhizophysidae
- Genus: Rhizophysa; Péron & Lesueur, 1807

= Rhizophysa =

Genus of hydrozoans

Rhizophysa is a genus of cnidarians belonging to the family Rhizophysidae.

The species of this genus are found in Malesia, Northern America.

Species:

- Rhizophysa chamissonis Eysenhardt, 1821
- Rhizophysa eysenhardtii Gegenbaur, 1859
- Rhizophysa filiformis (Forsskål, 1775)
- Rhizophysa uvaria Fewkes, 1886
