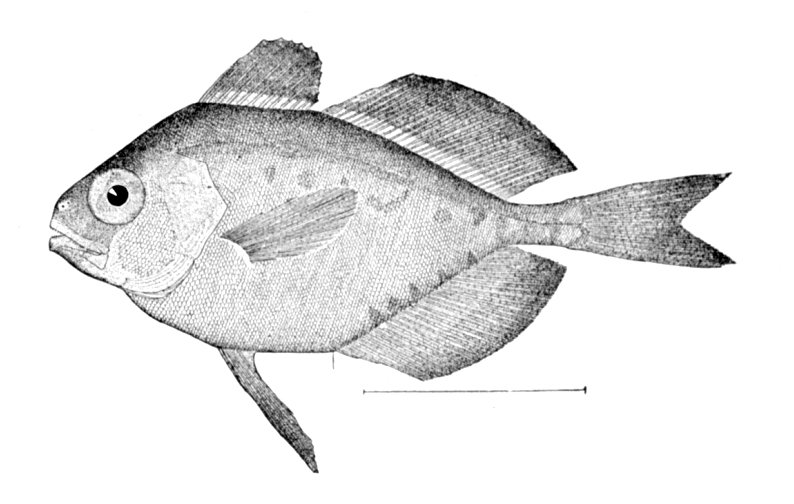
- Bluefin driftfish, Psenes pellucidus

Scientific classification
- Kingdom: Animalia
- Phylum: Chordata
- Class: Actinopterygii
- Order: Scombriformes
- Suborder: Stromateoidei
- Family: Nomeidae; Günther, 1860

Genera
- Cubiceps; Nomeus; Psenes

= Driftfish =

Driftfishes Temporal range: Bartonian–present

Family of ray-finned fishes

Nomeidae, the driftfishes, are a family of scombriform ray-finned fishes found in tropical and subtropical waters throughout the world. The family includes about 16 species. The largest species, such as the Cape fathead, Cubiceps capensis, reach 1 m in length.

Several species are found in association with siphonophores (which are colonies of tiny individual animals that have specialised functions which resemble jellyfish) such as the Portuguese man o' war; the man-of-war fish, Nomeus gronovii, is known to eat its tentacles and gonads, as well as feeding on other jellyfishes. Other species of driftfishes are associated with the floating seaweed Sargassum. The Cape fathead feeds mainly on salps. Some species of Cubiceps are occasionally caught on pelagic longlines set for swordfish.

Fossil genera include Psenicubiceps Daniltshenko, 1980, ?Psenes macrolepis Arambourg, 1967, and Rybapina Bannikov, 1993 from the Early Oligocene of the North Caucasus and Iran. An older, indeterminate Rybapina specimen from the middle Eocene (Bartonian) of the North Caucasus represents the earliest record of the group. Cubariomma Bannikov, 2018 from the Early Oligocene of the North Caucasus may also be either a nomeid or an ariommatid.

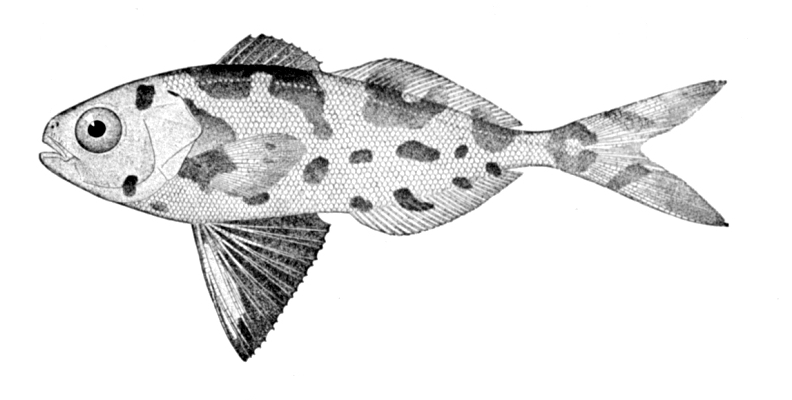
Man-of-war fish, Nomeus gronovii

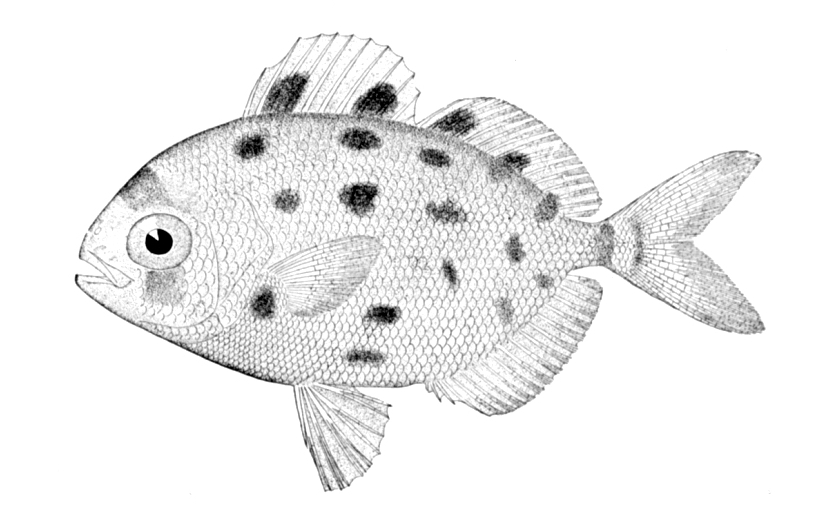
Silver driftfish, Psenes maculatus
