= Théophile Rudolphe Studer =

Swiss ornithologist and marine biologist

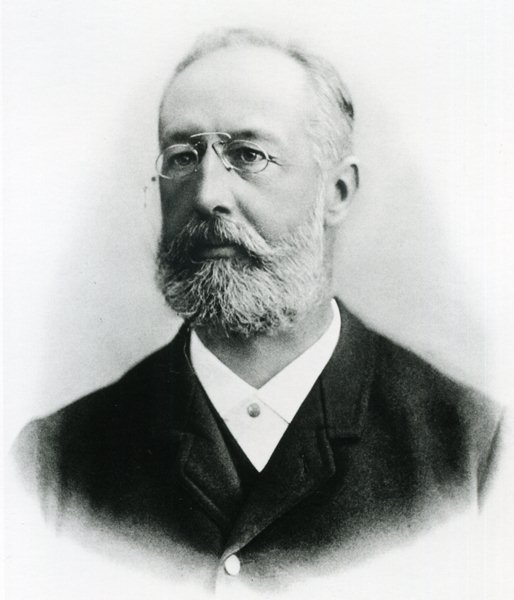

Théophile Rudolphe Studer or Theophil Studer (27 November 1845 – 12 February 1922) was a Swiss ornithologist and marine biologist. He worked on the collections made on the voyage of the SMS Gazelle and produced a catalogue of the birds of the Switzerland. Another major work was on the study of dog skeletons associated with prehistoric human settlements. He worked as a professor of zoology at the University of Bern from 1873.

== Life and work ==
Studer was born in Bern to Gottlieb and Henriette Kappeler. He studied medicine from 1865 to 1870 at Bern and became a military doctor, serving during the Franco-German war. He then studied zoology at Leipzig under Rudolf Leuckart. From 1871 to 1922 he was a curator of zoological collections at the museum of natural history in Bern. In 1874–1876 he took part in a scientific journey aboard the German steam frigate SMS Gazelle, sent in part to study the 1874 transit of Venus. Two years after his return he was a professor of zoology and comparative anatomy at the school of veterinary medicine in Bern. He conducted studies on the remains of canines from Neolithic and Paleolithic archeological digs. He presided over the Swiss Society of Natural Sciences from 1887 to 1992.

== Published works ==
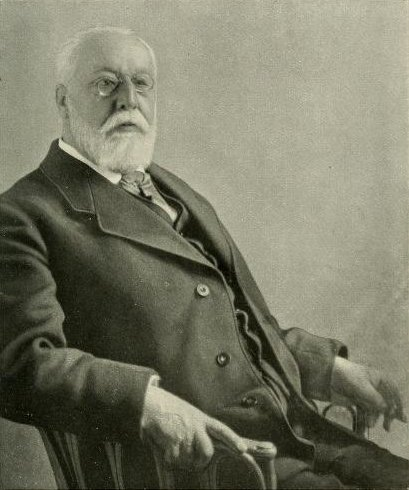
Théophile Rudolphe Studer

With Victor Fatio (1838–1906), he published the first three installments of Catalogue des oiseaux de la Suisse (Catalogue of birds of Switzerland). Other writings by Studer include:

- Übersicht ūber die Ophiuriden welche während der Reise S.M.S. Gazelle um die Erde 1874-1876 gesammelt Wurden, 1882 - Overview of Ophiuroidea, collected by the S.M.S. Gazelle voyage of 1874–1876.
- Verzeichniss der Crustaceen welche während der Reise S.M.S. Gazelle an der Westküste von Afrika, Ascension und dem Cap der guten Hoffnung gesammelt wurden, 1882 - Directory of crustaceans, collected by the S.M.S. Gazelle voyage to the west coast of Africa, Ascension Island and the Cape of Good Hope.
- Isopoden, gesammelt während der Reise S.M.S. Gazelle um die Erde 1874-76, 1884 - Isopoda collected by the S.M.S. Gazelle voyage of 1874–76.
- Verzeichniss der während der Reise S.M.S. Gazelle um die Erde, 1874-1876, gesammelten Asteriden und Euryalideen, 1884 - Directory of the S.M.S. Gazelle voyage, collections of Asteridea and Euryalida.
- "Supplementary report on the Alcyonaria collected by H.M.S. Challenger during the years 1873-76", published in English in 1889.
- Fauna helvetica. Oiseaux, 1895 - Swiss fauna, birds.
- Fauna helvetica. Mollusques, 1896 - Swiss fauna, mollusks.
