= Phronimoidea =

Scientific classification
- Kingdom: Animalia
- Phylum: Arthropoda
- Class: Malacostraca
- Order: Amphipoda
- Parvorder: Physocephalatidira
- Superfamily: Phronimoidea; Rafinesque, 1815

Families
- See text

Superfamily of crustaceans

Phronimoidea is a superfamily of planktonic amphipod crustaceans in the sub-order Hyperiidea.

== Families ==
- Bougisidae Zeidler, 2004
- Cystisomatidae Willemöes-Suhm, 1875
- Dairellidae Bovallius, 1887
- Hyperiidae Dana, 1852
- Iulopididae Zeidler, 2004
- Lestrigonidae Zeidler, 2004
- Phronimidae Rafinesque, 1815
- Phrosinidae Dana, 1852
