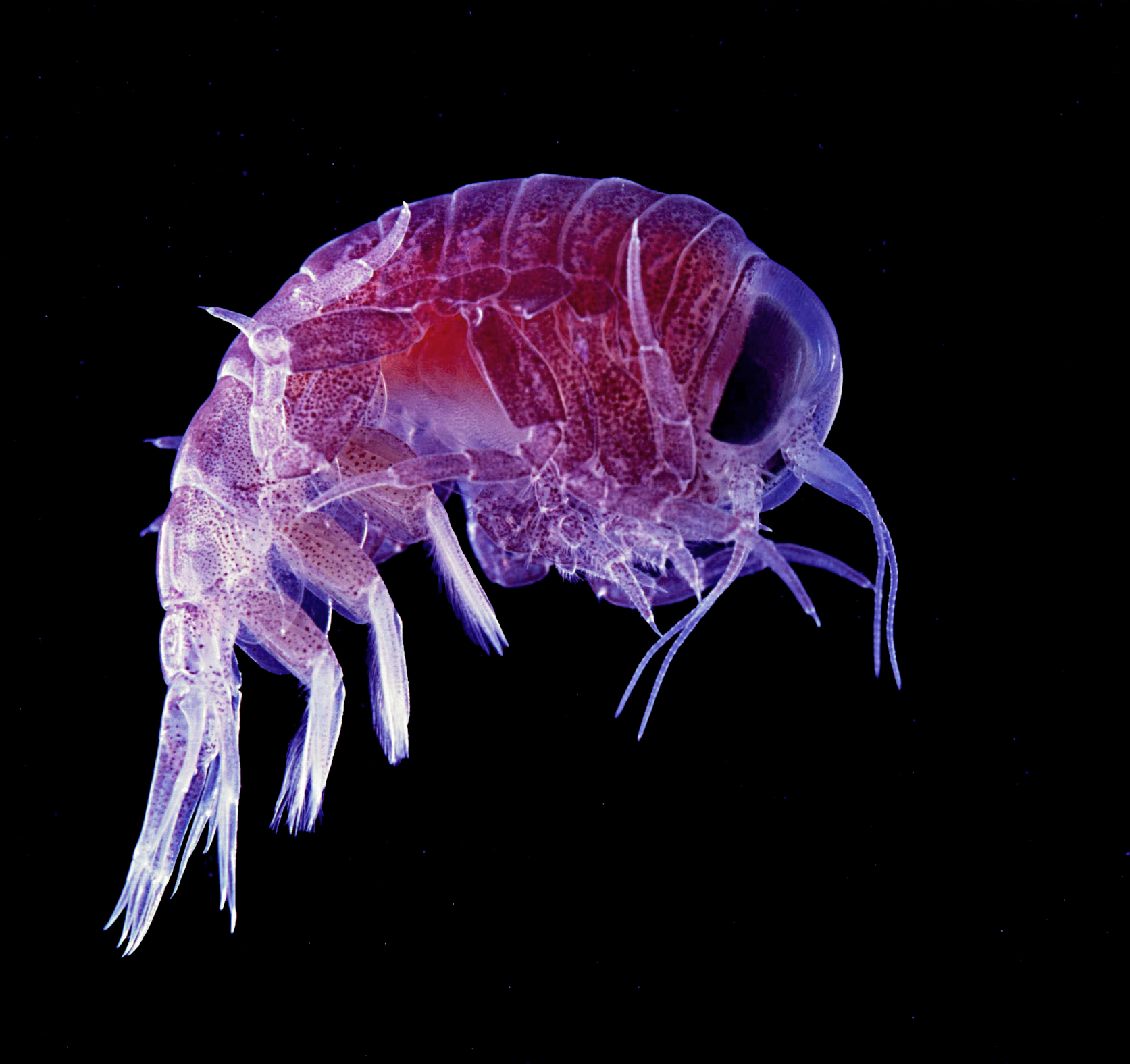
- Hyperia (Hyperiidae)

Scientific classification
- Kingdom: Animalia
- Phylum: Arthropoda
- Clade: Pancrustacea
- Class: Malacostraca
- Order: Amphipoda
- Suborder: Hyperiidea; H. Milne-Edwards, 1830

Families
- See text

= Hyperiidea =

Suborder of crustaceans

The Hyperiidea is one of the six suborders of amphipods, small aquatic crustaceans. Unlike some other suborders of Amphipoda, hyperiids are exclusively marine and do not occur in fresh water. Hyperiids are distinguished by their large eyes and planktonic habitat. Most species of hyperiids are parasites or predators of salps and jellyfish in the plankton, although a significant minority (~1/3 of genera) are free-swimming predators.

== Gallery ==
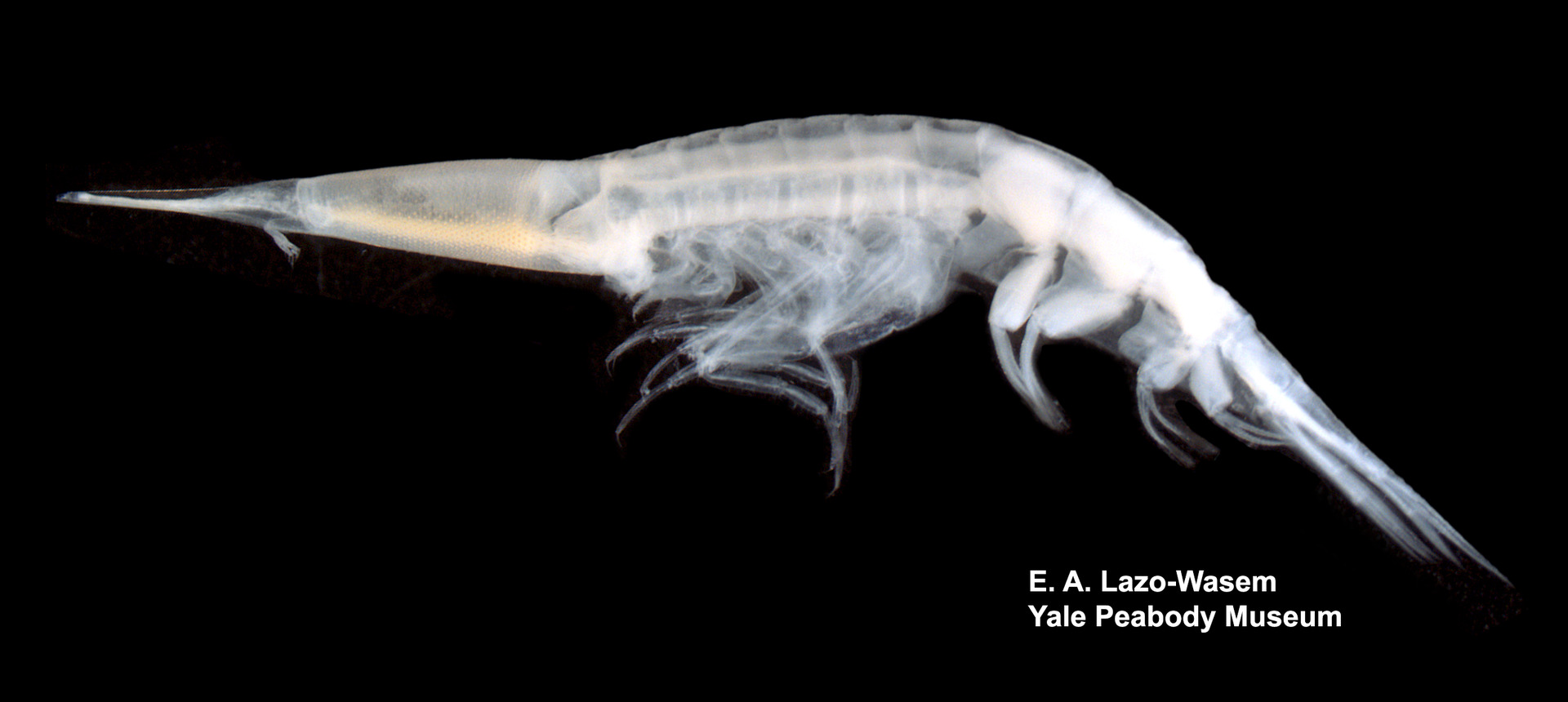
Specimen of Streetsia challengeri (Oxycephalidae). Its left and right eyes are fused to form a single cylindrical eye made of ~2500 ommatidia. It can see all around, but not ahead or behind.

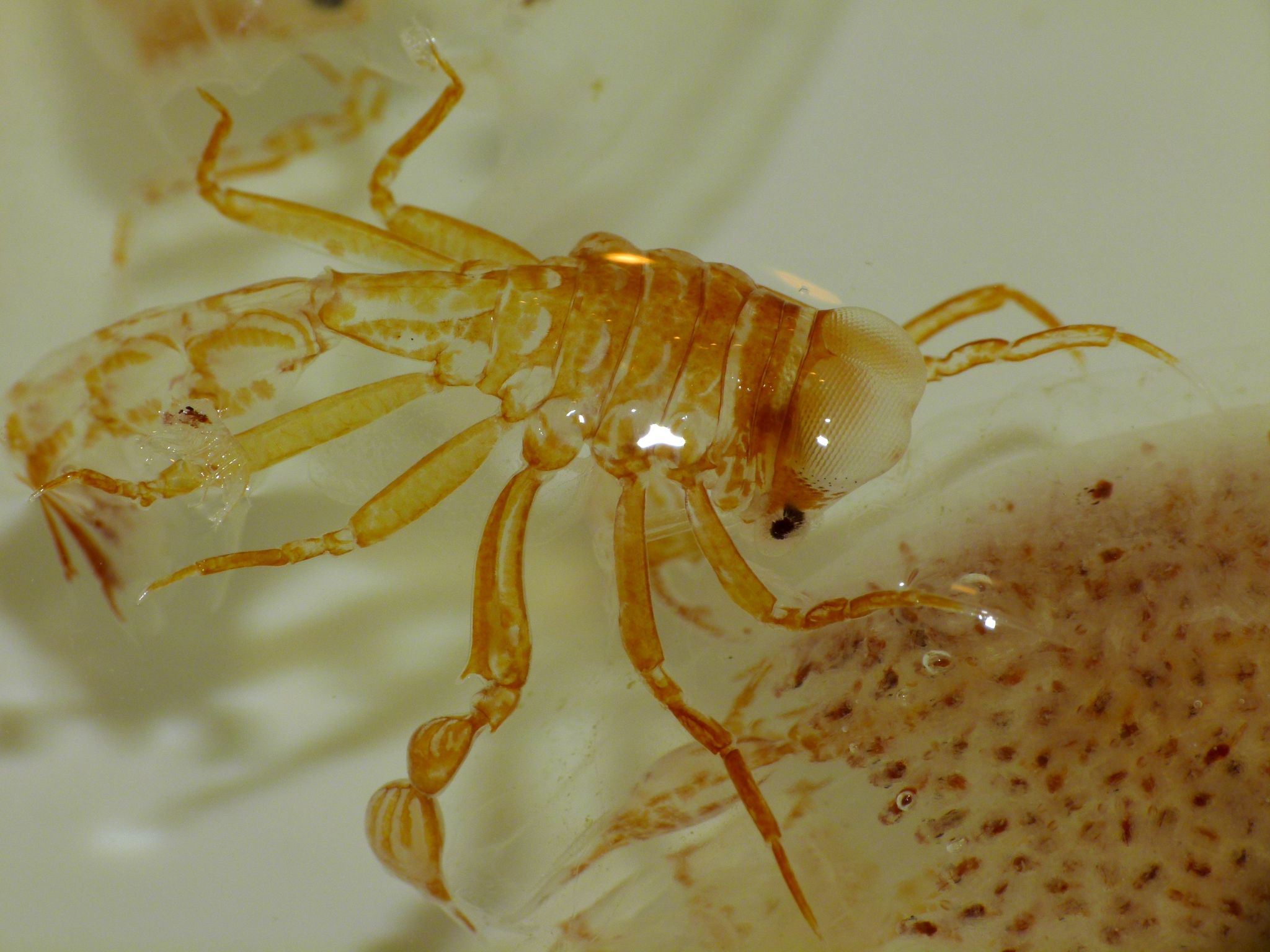
Specimen of Phronima sedentaria (Phronimidae)

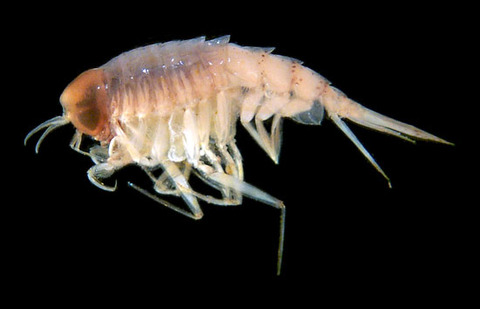
Specimen of Themisto (Hyperiidae)

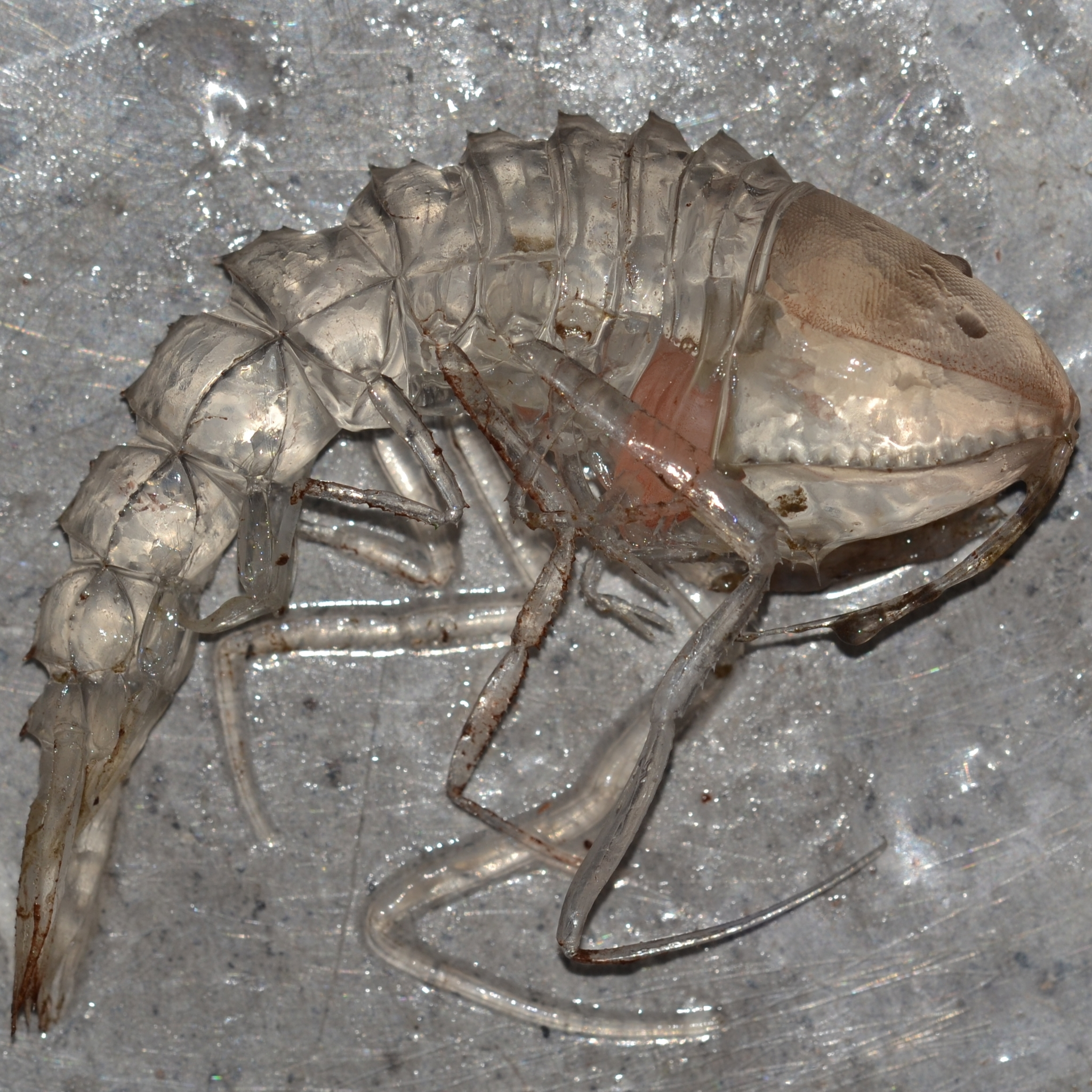
Specimen of Cystisoma (Cystisomatidae)

== Taxonomy ==
According to World Amphipoda Database, 284 species of Hyperiidea are known in 2025.

Some controversy exists as to the number of families in the Hyperiidea, being given as between 20 and 23 depending on whether groups like the Thaumatopsidae are considered distinct or not. The taxonomy of Hyperiidea currently accepted by the World Register of Marine Species is as follows:

Infraorder Physocephalata Bowman & Gruner, 1973

- Parvorder Physocephalatidira Bowman & Gruner, 1973
  - Superfamily Phronimoidea Rafinesque, 1815
    - Family Bougisidae Zeidler, 2004
    - Family Cystisomatidae Willemöes-Suhm, 1875
    - Family Dairellidae Bovallius, 1887
    - Family Hyperiidae Dana, 1852
    - Family Iulopididae Zeidler, 2004
    - Family Lestrigonidae Zeidler, 2004
    - Family Phronimidae Rafinesque, 1815
    - Family Phrosinidae Dana, 1852
  - Superfamily Platysceloidea Spence Bate, 1862
    - Family Amphithyridae Zeidler, 2016
    - Family Anapronoidae Bowman & Gruner, 1973
    - Family Brachyscelidae Stephensen, 1923
    - Family Eupronoidae Zeidler, 2016
    - Family Lycaeidae Claus, 1879
    - Family Lycaeopsidae Chevreux, 1913
    - Family Oxycephalidae Dana, 1852
    - Family Parascelidae Bovallius, 1887
    - Family Platyscelidae Spence Bate, 1862
    - Family Pronoidae Dana, 1852
    - Family Thamneidae Zeidler, 2016
    - Family Tryphanidae Boeck, 1871
  - Superfamily Vibilioidea Dana, 1852
    - Family Cyllopodidae Bovallius, 1887
    - Family Paraphronimidae Bovallius, 1887
    - Family Vibiliidae Dana, 1852

Infraorder Physosomata Pirlot, 1929

- Parvorder Physosomatidira Pirlot, 1929
  - Superfamily Lanceoloidea Bovallius, 1887
    - Family Chuneolidae Woltereck, 1909
    - Family Lanceolidae Bovallius, 1887
    - Family Megalanceolidae Zeidler, 2009
    - Family Metalanceolidae Zeidler, 2009
    - Family Microphasmidae Stephensen & Pirlot, 1931
    - Family Mimonecteolidae Zeidler, 2009
    - Family Prolanceolidae Zeidler, 2009
  - Superfamily Scinoidea Stebbing, 1888
    - Family Archaeoscinidae K. H. Barnard, 1930
    - Family Microscinidae Zeidler, 2012
    - Family Mimonectidae Bovallius, 1885
    - Family Mimoscinidae Zeidler, 2012
    - Family Scinidae Stebbing, 1888

== Distribution ==
Hyperiidea are known from many oceans of the world, including 69 species in the Southern Ocean.
