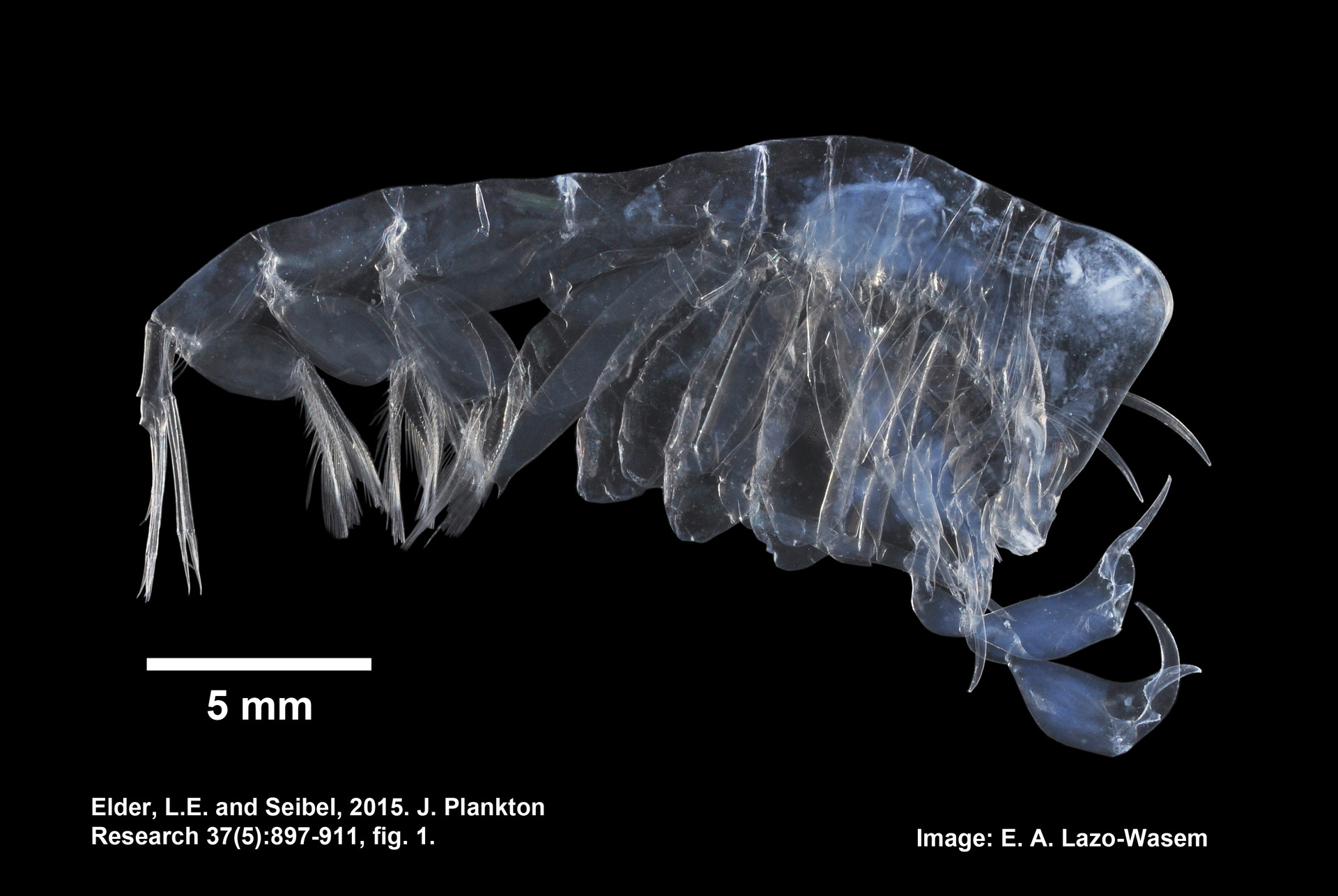

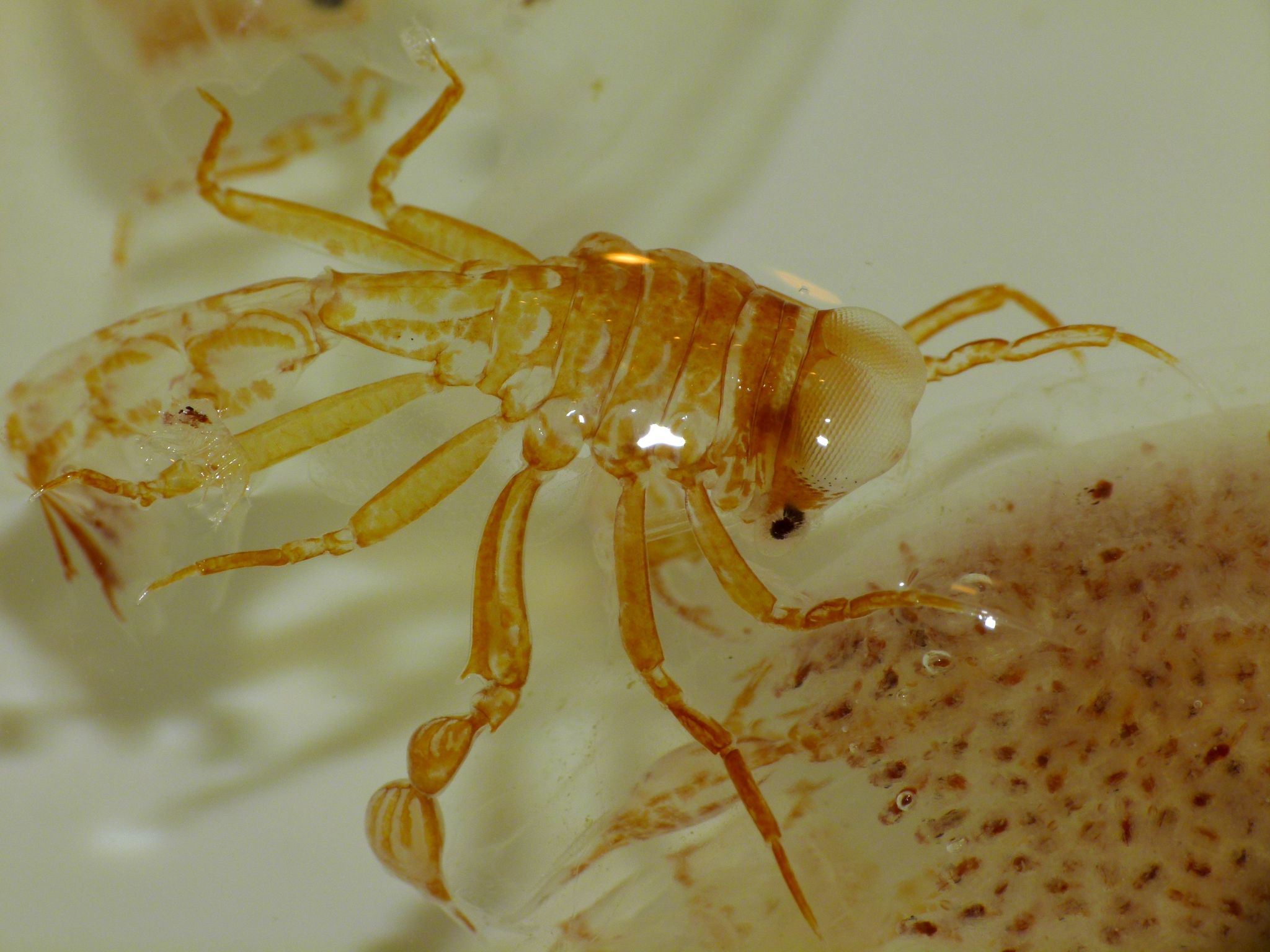
- Specimens of Phronima sedentaria

Scientific classification
- Kingdom: Animalia
- Phylum: Arthropoda
- Clade: Pancrustacea
- Class: Malacostraca
- Order: Amphipoda
- Family: Phronimidae
- Genus: Phronima; Latreille, 1802

Type species
- Cancer sedentarius Forsskål, 1775

Species
- Phronima atlantica Phronima bowmani Phronima bucephala Phronima colletti Phronima curvipes Phronima dunbari Phronima pacifica Phronima sedentaria (Type Species); Phronima solitaria Phronima stebbingi

= Phronima =

Genus of crustaceans

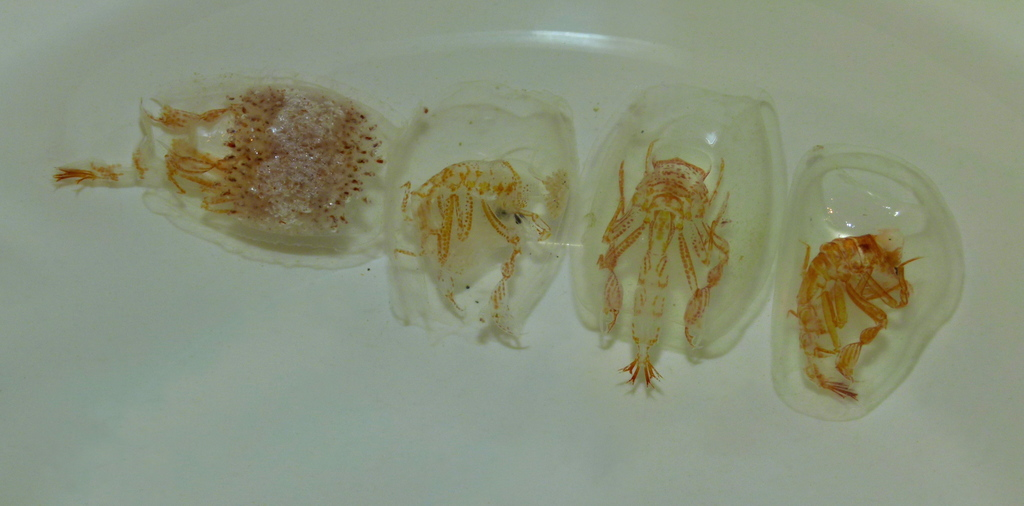
Photnima sedentaria Offspring

Phronima is a genus of small, deep sea hyperiid amphipods of the family Phronimidae. It is found throughout the world's oceans, except in polar regions. Phronima species live in the pelagic zone of the deep ocean. Their bodies are semitransparent. Although commonly known as parasites, they are more technically correctly called parasitoids. Instead of constantly feeding on a live host, females attack salps, using their mouths and claws to eat the animal and hollow out its gelatinous shell. Phronima females then enter the barrel and lay their eggs inside, then propel the barrel through the water as the larvae develop, providing them with fresh food and water.

It is sometimes thought to be an inspiration for the fictional xenomorphs.

Phronima species possess unique compound eyes adapted to detect blue-green wavelengths of light, which are prominent in the bioluminescent flashes of potential prey and predators. These specialized visual adaptations aid Phronima in navigating the dim mid-ocean environment, where bioluminescence serves as an important ecological signal.

== Classification ==
The genus Phronima contains these 10 species:

- Phronima atlantica Guérin-Méneville, 1836
- Phronima bowmani Shih, 1991
- Phronima bucephala Giles, 1888
- Phronima colletti Bovallius, 1887
- Phronima curvipes Vosseler, 1901
- Phronima dunbari Shih, 1991
- Phronima pacifica Streets, 1877
- Phronima sedentaria (Forskål, 1775) (type species)
- Phronima solitaria Guérin-Méneville, 1844
- Phronima stebbingi Vosseler, 1901
