= Muggiaea kochii =

Scientific classification
- Kingdom: Animalia
- Phylum: Cnidaria
- Class: Hydrozoa
- Order: Siphonophorae
- Family: Diphyidae
- Genus: Muggiaea
- Species: M. kochii

Binomial name
- Muggiaea kochii (Will, 1844)

Synonyms
- Diphyes kochii Will, 1844; Ersaea pyramidalis Will, 1844; Eudoxia eschscholtzi Busch, 1851; Muggiaea pyramidalis (Will, 1844)

Species of hydrozoan

Muggiaea kochii is a species of small hydrozoan, a siphonophore in the family Diphyidae.

== Description ==
Muggiaea kochii is very similar in appearance to the closely related Muggiaea atlantica. It consists of a single nectophore (swimming bell), the exterior of which has five complete longitudinal ridges, the bases of which bend dorsally. The hydroecium (ventral cavity) is shallow and the somatocyst (part of the gastrovascular system) extends to about half the height of the nectophore. The eudoxid stage (reproductive element) is indistinguishable from that of M. atlantica.

== Distribution and habitat ==
Muggiaea kochii is found in the neritic zone on both sides of the warm temperate and subtropical Atlantic Ocean. It is present on the Gulf Coast of the United States where it often occurs in brackish water in bays. In the Mediterranean Sea it is often most abundant in the period April to June, but this varies from year to year. It also occurs in the Adriatic Sea where it was joined in the 1990s by the non-native M. atlantica. This species was first detected in the marine lakes on the island of Mljet in southern Croatia in 2001, and since then, seems to have displaced M. kochii in the Great Lake there.

In the Atlantic Ocean, the ranges of M. kochii and M. atlantica only overlap to a limited extent; where one is abundant, the other tends to be uncommon. M. kochii is a warm-temperate species, being found between 48°N and 36°S, while M. atlantica is a cool-temperate species occurring between 55°N and 37°S.

== Ecology ==
Muggiaea kochii feeds mostly on copepods while predators such as hyperiid amphipods feed on M. kochii.

Reproduction in Muggiaea kochii is by an alternation of generations between an asexual polygastric form (bearing both asexual and reproductive elements) and the sexual eudoxid form which becomes separated from the nectophore. The complete cycle takes two weeks at 24 °C (75 °F) and three weeks at 18 °C (64 °F). When the water temperature falls to 13 °C (55 °F), the animal becomes lethargic and unmoving.
