= Aporosa (coral) =

Suborder of corals

Aporosa was a suborder of the stony corals (order Scleractinia) first described in the classification of Milne-Edwards and Haime (1857), where it contrasted with the suborder Perferata. The distinction between the two suborders was based on the structure of the coral skeletons. Beginning with the taxonomy of Vaughan and Wells (1943), the stony corals were divided in subgroups based on more than just skeletal structures and since then Aporosa is no longer used as a classification of the stony corals.
