= Diphyes =

Diphyes may refer to:

- Diphyes (cnidarian), a genus of hydrozoans in the family Diphyidae
- Diphyes, a genus of plants in the family Orchidaceae, synonym of Bulbophyllum
- Diphyes, a genus of wasps in the family Ichneumonidae, synonym of Diphyus
