= Glossocephalus milneedwardsi =

Scientific classification
- Domain: Eukaryota
- Kingdom: Animalia
- Phylum: Arthropoda
- Class: Malacostraca
- Order: Amphipoda
- Suborder: Hyperiidea
- Family: Oxycephalidae
- Genus: Glossocephalus
- Species: G. milneedwardsi

Binomial name
- Glossocephalus milneedwardsi Bovallius, 1887

Species of Malacostraca

Glossocephalus milneedwardsi is a species of amphipod in the family Oxycephalidae. It is epipelagic and lives in association with ctenophores.
