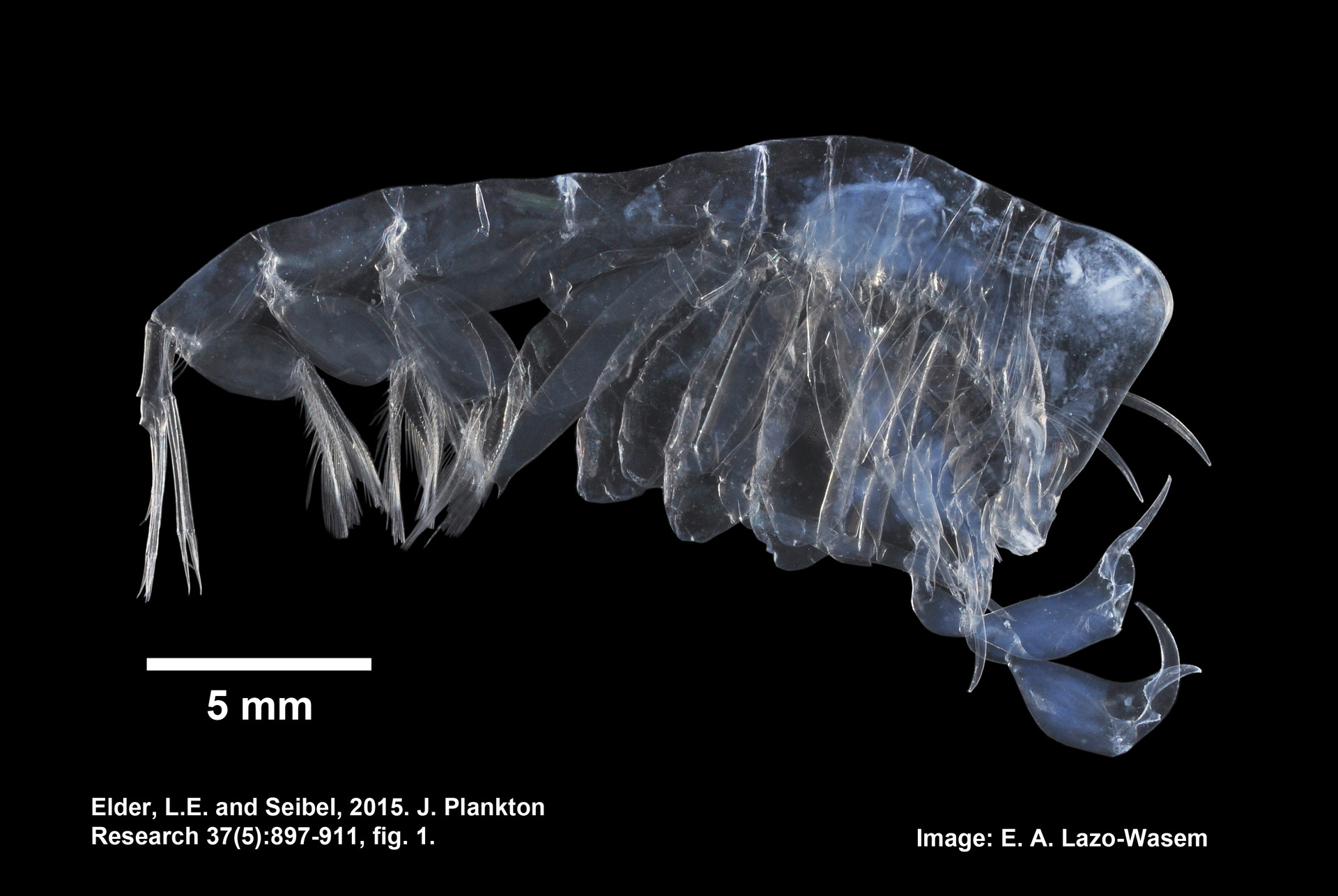

Scientific classification
- Kingdom: Animalia
- Phylum: Arthropoda
- Clade: Pancrustacea
- Class: Malacostraca
- Order: Amphipoda
- Family: Phronimidae
- Genus: Phronima
- Species: P. sedentaria

Binomial name
- Phronima sedentaria (Forsskål, 1775)

Synonyms
- Cancer sedentarius Forskål, 1775; Phronima atlantica Guérin-Meneville, 1836

= Phronima sedentaria =

Species of crustacean

Phronima sedentaria is a species of amphipod crustaceans found in oceans at a depth of up to 1 km (0.6 mi). They are large in size relative to other members of the family Phronimidae. Individuals may be found inside barrel-like homes, created most commonly from the tunics of select species of pelagic tunicates; Phronima females appropriate these tunics and rear their young within. P. sedentaria is known to employ multiple feeding strategies and other interesting behaviors, including daily vertical migration. The species is also known by the more common names pram bug and barrel shrimp.

== Description ==
Phronima sedentaria is the largest and most abundant species in the family Phronimidae. Sexual dimorphism is reflected between male and female members in the more extended and prominent antennae of the males relative to the short, reduced ones of females. More obviously, the size discrepancy between males and females distinguishes them further. Females measure up to 42 mm (1.7 in) long, while males are only 15 mm (0.6 in) long. This species also possesses a complex optical system which involves the use of two sets of compound eyes. Both sets use bundles of crystalline cones to process visual information: one set ("medial eyes") faces dorsally and one set faces laterally ("lateral eyes").

The medial eyes have a very small retina, but very large compound eyes. The compound eyes occupy the entire dorsal surface of the head, collecting light, and guides the light down crystalline cones like optical fibers, until they hit the medial retina. This is hypothesized to be camouflage against mid-water predators. While most of its body is transparent, retinas are necessarily opaque to function effectively. By using optical fibers, a large light-collecting surface can be combined with a small retina.

The medial compound eyes are extremely fine, with an angle of $0.25^\circ$ between ommatidia. However, this was at the price of a restricted visual field; each eye can only see an angular width of $15^\circ$, and both visual fields are largely overlapping, meaning that they have fine binocular vision in a narrow beam aimed directly above.

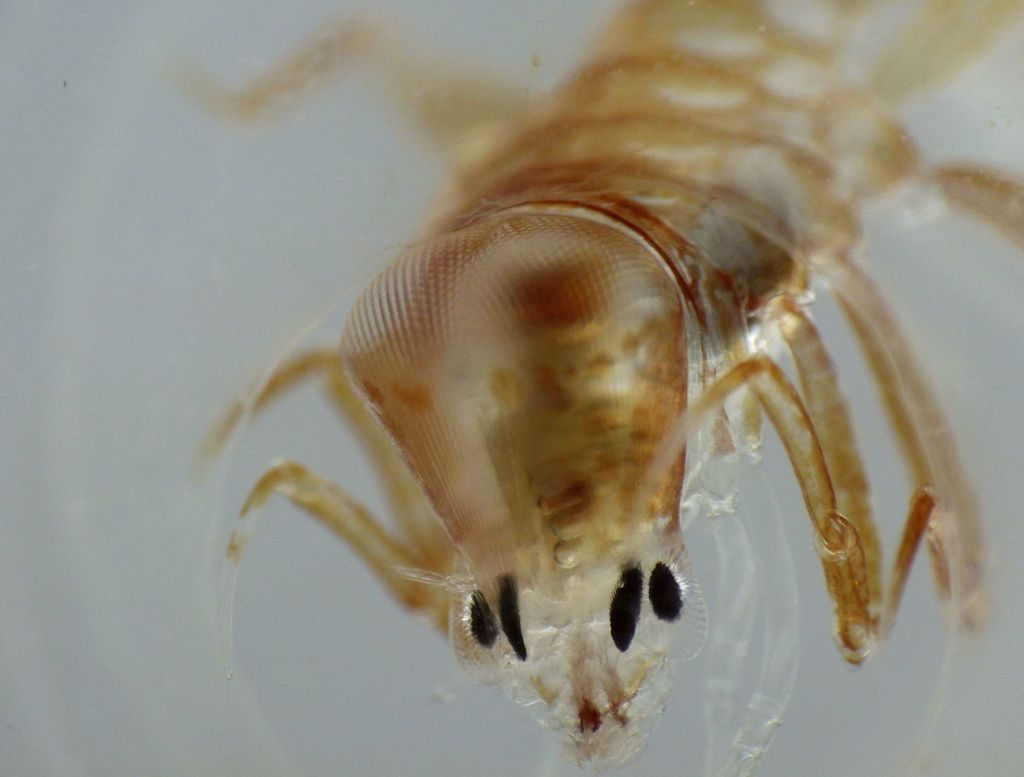
The cones which comprise the eyes of P. sedentaria may be seen in this image. They appear as stalks which run from the top surface of the head (the compound eyes) downward toward the black retinae of the organism.

== Distribution ==
Phronima sedentaria is found in temperate, subtropical, and tropical waters of all the world's oceans, including the Mediterranean Sea. It is usually found in midwater pelagic habitats, but can be found migrating all the way to the surface.

== Ecology ==
Phronima sedentaria most commonly exhibits a symbiotic relationship with tunicates of the genera Pyrosoma, Doliolum, and Salpa. It is not entirely certain how to classify the symbiotic relationship between P. sedentaria and its hosts, as instances of commensalism, parasitism, and predation have all been observed. However, some research has suggested that the majority of suborder Hyperiidea members exhibit parasitic behavior. Females of P. sedentaria live in the barrel-like bodies of salps, pyrosomes, and cnidarians, and use their strong pleopods to propel their homes through the water. They can somersault rapidly in their barrels, thus quickly changing direction. However, speed is reduced by a factor of three to four when swimming while inside a barrel compared to swimming without one. The shape of the barrel is generally asymmetrical, with one opening three times larger than that of the other. In order to construct their barrels, females first locate a suitable salp, pyrosome, or cnidarian host and either cut into the host or enter through an existing opening. Once inside, the female consumes the organism within and carves out the gelatinous inside, killing it and leaving nothing but the tunic. The cells on the tunic layer may serve various functions for the P. sedentaria, including protection from UV light, storage of acid, and defense against microorganisms, like bacteria. In laboratory experiments with restricted access to potential hosts, females have additionally displayed competition for barrels.

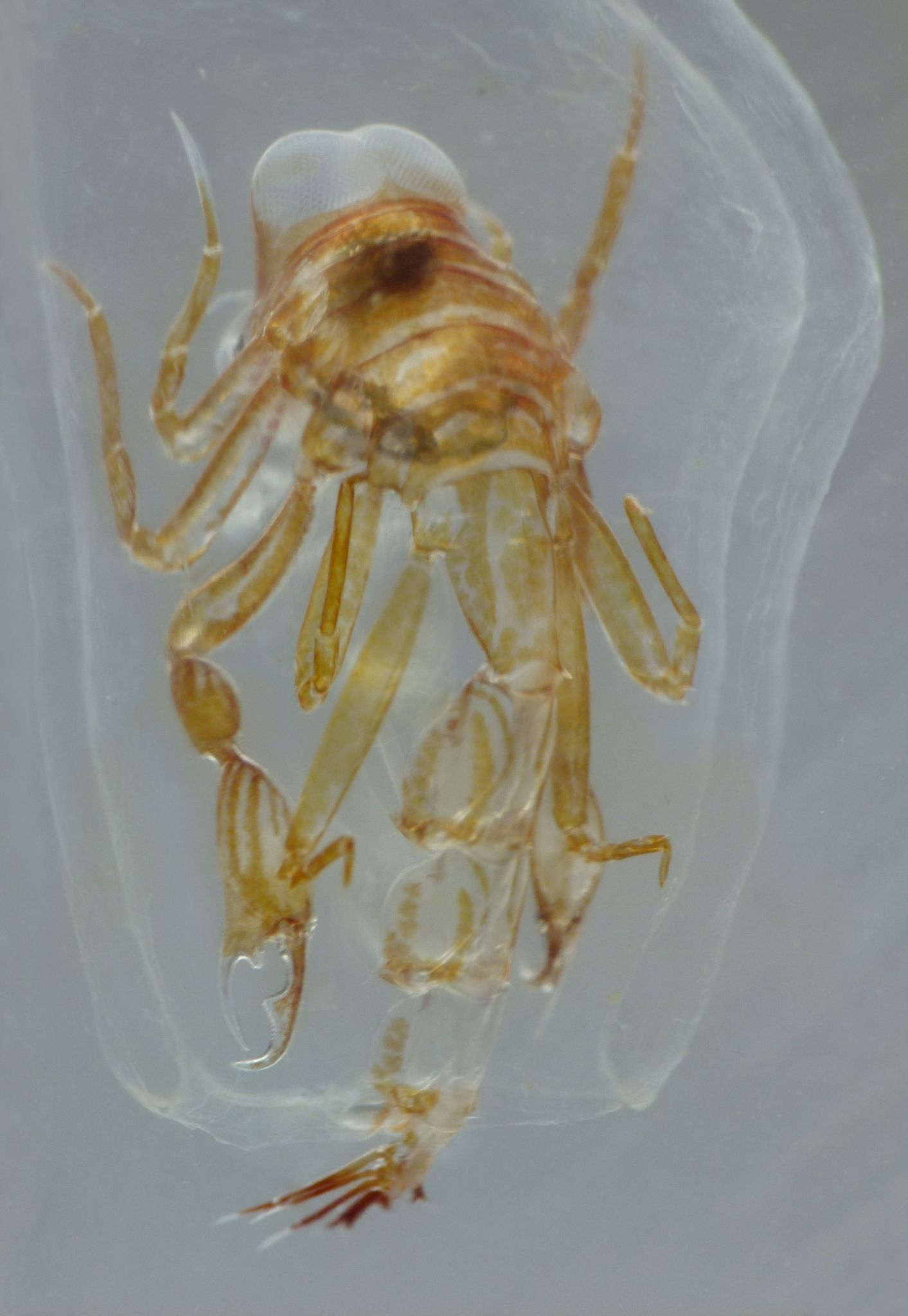
Posterior view of a P. sedentaria amphipod inhabiting a host salp. Its dorsal set of compound eyes and legs (pereiopods and pleopods) are visible from this angle.

While certain prey (salps, pyrosomes, and cnidaria) have additional uses for P. sedentaria in hosting their young and providing feeding platforms, the species also pursues other zooplankton, such as krill, arrowworms, and other crustaceans. P. sedentaria use different feeding techniques depending on the food source, but the leading sets of pereiopods (front legs) are primarily used in all cases. The various feeding apparati, such as the mandible, maxillipeds, and maxillae, manipulate the food into small pieces which are then able to fit through the esophagus. Feeding preferentially occurs at nighttime when members of this species undergo a vertical migration of around 200–350 meters to the ocean's surface. Research has shown this species is susceptible to temperature fluctuations outside of the range 8-25 degrees Celsius (46-77 degrees Fahrenheit), which explains the desire for cooler deep water (300–600 meters deep) throughout the day and warmer shallow waters (0–25 meters deep) at night. P. sedentaria typically migrate to hypoxic areas (such as the Oxygen Minimum Zone) during the day, causing low metabolic rates and physical activity.

Known predators of P. sedentaria include the longnose lancetfish, European flying squid, Pacific pomfret, albacore, and skipjack tuna.

=== Reproduction & life cycle ===
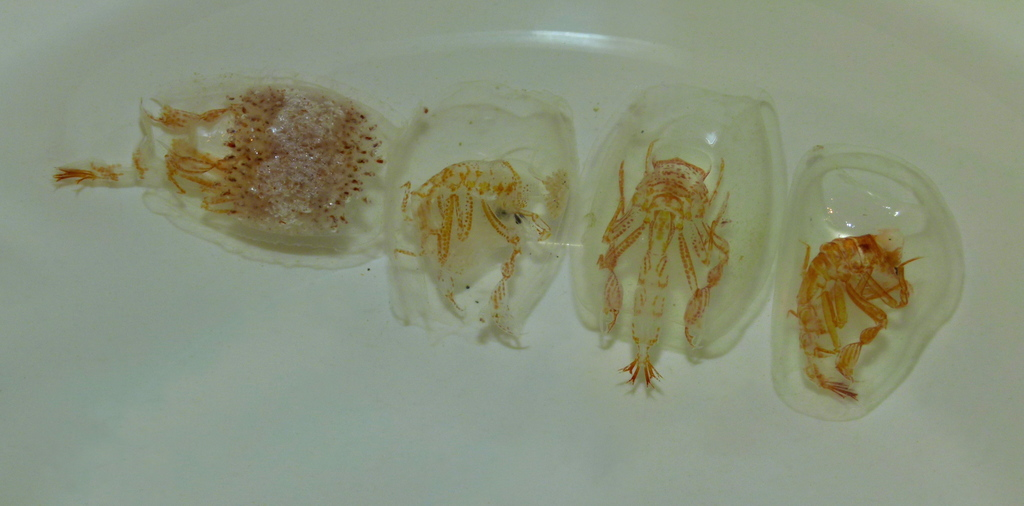
Four specimens of adult P. sedentaria in their barrels are seen here, one being a female with hundreds of offspring. The offspring are positioned in a characteristic band around the middle of the barrel.

Female Phronima sedentaria are capable of producing up to 600 eggs at a time. Juveniles spend their early development within the mother in a specialized pouch called the marsupium. After finding a suitable host, the female begins to transform the barrel into a nursery for its young. She uses her pleopods and anterior pereiopods to remove offspring from the marsupium, while her posterior pereiopods maintain stability and grasp onto the barrel. Once inside, the young organize themselves into a medial ring around the interior of the barrel. This shape is maintained until the mother delivers food, which the offspring then feed on and return to formation afterwards. Young P. sedentaria use the barrel as another food source. The offspring of P. sedentaria develop within their barrel homes until reaching prematurity, after which they are able to feed and survive independently. Development is characterized by growth stages in which molting occurs. Each molt adds a new segment to the sets of pleopods in the rear. The emergence of sexual dimorphism occurs soon after prematurity.
