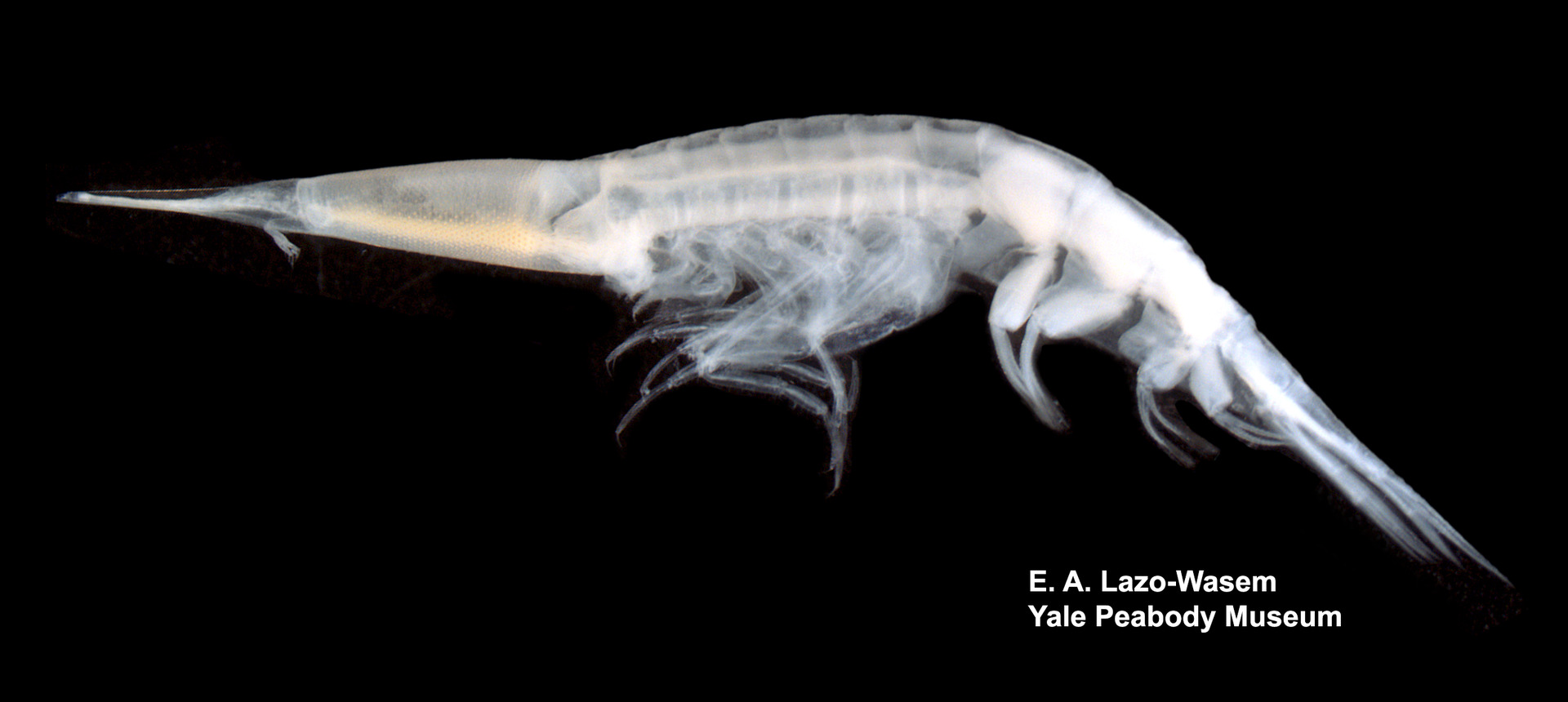
- Specimen; YPM

Scientific classification
- Kingdom: Animalia
- Phylum: Arthropoda
- Clade: Pancrustacea
- Class: Malacostraca
- Order: Amphipoda
- Family: Oxycephalidae
- Genus: Streetsia
- Species: S. challengeri

Binomial name
- Streetsia challengeri Stebbing, 1888

Synonyms
- Oxycephalus pronoïdes Bovallius, 1887; Streetsia pronoides (Bovallius, 1887); Streetsia stebbingi Chevreux, 1900; Streetsia washingtoni Senna, 1902; Streetsia gaussi Spandl, 1927

= Streetsia challengeri =

Species of marine amphipod

Streetsia challengeri is a species of amphipod in the family Oxycephalidae. The species is the type of the genus Streetsia, and was described based on a female type captured from the North Pacific by the Challenger expedition. It has subsequently been found in other locales, such as the East Pacific and the Gulf of Mexico.

The species possesses an elongated head, rostrum, and eyes, along with "complexly" subchelate gnathopods. The compound eyes completely cover the sides of the cylindrical head, and are effectively fused together. The 2500 or so ommatidia are arranged in such a way that it provides almost circumferential vision, though has blindspots directly ahead and behind. It is thought that the eyes are optimized for acuity and sensitivity, and that parallax may be important for distance estimation.
