= Dairellidae =

Scientific classification
- Domain: Eukaryota
- Kingdom: Animalia
- Phylum: Arthropoda
- Class: Malacostraca
- Order: Amphipoda
- Suborder: Hyperiidea
- Superfamily: Phronimoidea
- Family: Dairellidae

Family of crustaceans

Dairellidae is a family of amphipods belonging to the order Amphipoda.

Genera:

- Dairella Bovallius, 1887
