= Brachyscelidae =

Scientific classification
- Domain: Eukaryota
- Kingdom: Animalia
- Phylum: Arthropoda
- Class: Malacostraca
- Order: Amphipoda
- Suborder: Hyperiidea
- Superfamily: Platysceloidea
- Family: Brachyscelidae

Family of crustaceans

Brachyscelidae is a family of amphipods belonging to the order Amphipoda.

Genera:

- Brachyscelus Spence Bate, 1861
