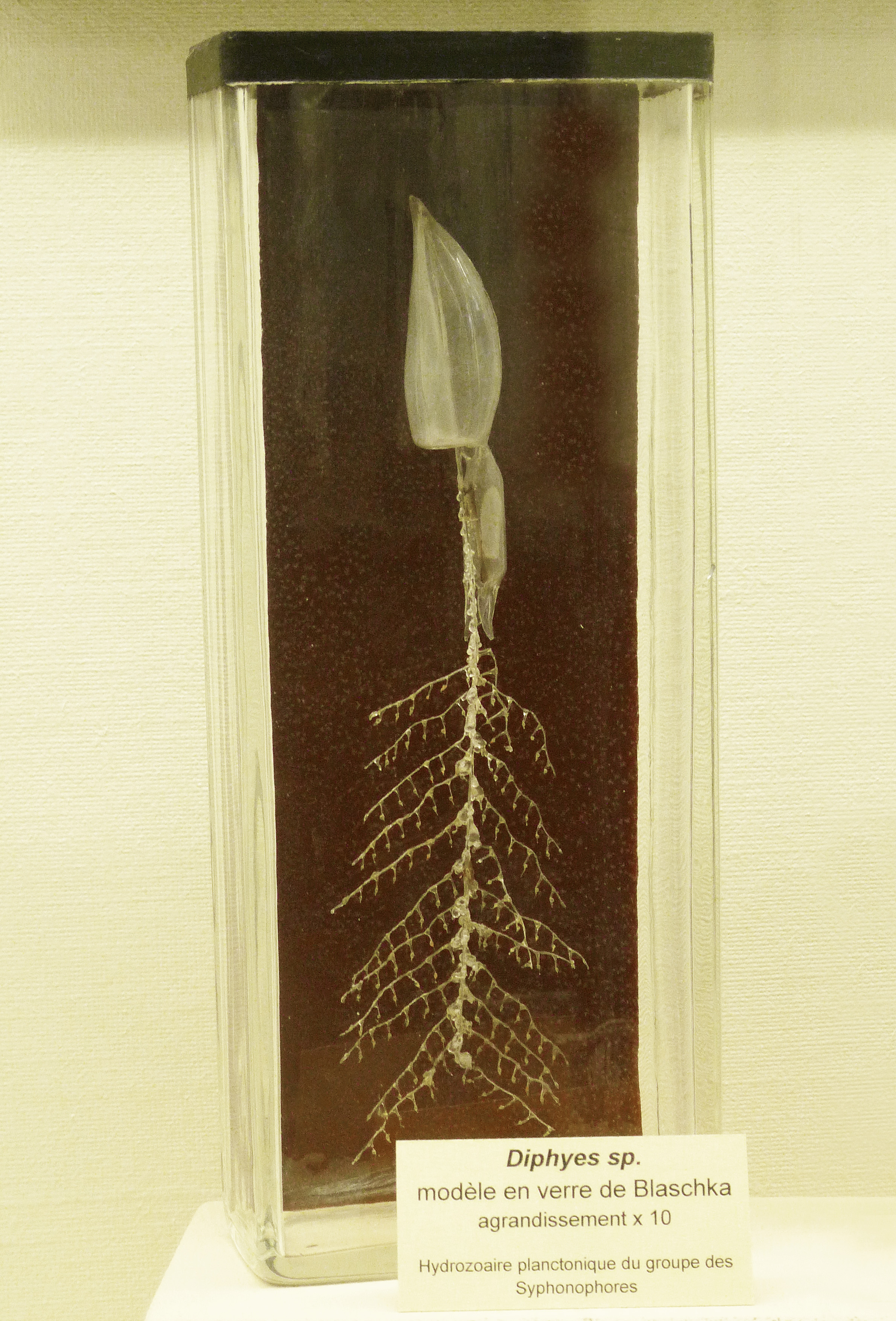
- Diphyes sp. from the Black Sea

Scientific classification
- Kingdom: Animalia
- Phylum: Cnidaria
- Class: Hydrozoa
- Order: Siphonophorae
- Suborder: Calycophorae
- Family: Diphyidae; Quoy & Gaimard, 1827

Genera
- See text

= Diphyidae =

Family of hydrozoans

The Diphyidae are a family of siphonophores. These are colonial siphonophores with two nectophores (swimming bells) arranged one behind the other. The front one includes a somatocyst (extension of the gastrovascular system), while the hind one does not. The somatocyst often contains an oil droplet for buoyancy control. A nectosac (central cavity with muscular walls) in each nectophore allows the organism to swim efficiently.

== Systematics ==
The World Register of Marine Species includes the following taxa in the family Diphyidae:

- Subfamily Diphyinae Quoy & Gaimard, 1827
  - Genus Chelophyes Totton, 1932
    - Chelophyes appendiculata (Eschscholtz, 1829)
    - Chelophyes contorta (Lens & van Riemsdijk, 1908)
  - Genus Dimophyes Moser, 1925
    - Dimophyes arctica (Chun, 1897)
  - Genus Diphyes Cuvier, 1817
    - Diphyes antarctica Moser, 1925
    - Diphyes bojani (Eschscholtz, 1825)
    - Diphyes chamissonis Huxley, 1859
    - Diphyes dispar Chamisso & Eysenhardt, 1821
  - Genus Eudoxoides Huxley, 1859
    - Eudoxoides mitra (Huxley, 1859)
    - Eudoxoides spiralis (Bigelow, 1911)
  - Genus Lensia Totton, 1932
    - Lensia achilles Totton, 1941
    - Lensia ajax Totton, 1941
    - Lensia asymmetrica Stepanjants, 1970
    - Lensia campanella (Moser, 1917)
    - Lensia challengeri Totton, 1954
    - Lensia conoidea (Keferstein & Ehlers, 1860)
    - Lensia cordata Totton, 1965
    - Lensia cossack Totton, 1941
    - Lensia exeter Totton, 1941
    - Lensia fowleri (Bigelow, 1911)
    - Lensia gnanamuthui Daniel & Daniel, 1963
    - Lensia grimaldii Leloup, 1933
    - Lensia hardy Totton, 1941
    - Lensia havock Totton, 1941
    - Lensia hostile Totton, 1941
    - Lensia hotspur Totton, 1941
    - Lensia hunter Totton, 1941
    - Lensia leloupi Totton, 1954
    - Lensia lelouveteau Totton, 1941
    - Lensia meteori (Leloup, 1934)
    - Lensia multicristata (Moser, 1925)
    - Lensia panikkari Daniel, 1971
    - Lensia quadriculata Pages, Flood & Youngbluth, 2006
    - Lensia subtilis (Chun, 1886)
    - Lensia subtiloides (Lens & van Riemsdijk, 1908)
    - Lensia zenkevitchi Margulis, 1970
  - Genus Muggiaea Busch, 1851
    - Muggiaea atlantica Cunningham, 1892
    - Muggiaea bargmannae Totton, 1954
    - Muggiaea delsmani Totton, 1954
    - Muggiaea kochii (Will, 1844)
- Subfamily Giliinae Pugh & Pages, 1995
  - Genus Gilia Pugh & Pages, 1995
    - Gilia reticulata (Totton, 1954)
- Subfamily Sulculeolariinae Totton, 1954
  - Genus Sulculeolaria Blainville, 1830
    - Sulculeolaria biloba (Sars, 1846)
    - Sulculeolaria chuni (Lens & van Riemsdijk, 1908)
    - Sulculeolaria monoica (Chun, 1888)
    - Sulculeolaria quadrivalvis de Blainville, 1830
    - Sulculeolaria turgida (Gegenbaur, 1854)
