= Physocephalatidira =

Scientific classification
- Domain: Eukaryota
- Kingdom: Animalia
- Phylum: Arthropoda
- Class: Malacostraca
- Order: Amphipoda
- Suborder: Hyperiidea
- Infraorder: Physocephalata
- Parvorder: Physocephalatidira; Bowman & Gruner, 1973

Superfamilies
- Phronimoidea Rafinesque, 1815; Platysceloidea Spence Bate, 1862; Vibilioidea Dana, 1852

Group of crustaceans

Physocephalatidira is a parvorder of plankton in the sub-order Hyperiidea. It is the only taxon within the infraorder Physocephalata, making its parent a monotypic taxon.
