= Diphyes antarctica =

Scientific classification
- Kingdom: Animalia
- Phylum: Cnidaria
- Class: Hydrozoa
- Order: Siphonophorae
- Family: Diphyidae
- Genus: Diphyes
- Species: D. antarctica

Binomial name
- Diphyes antarctica Moser, 1925

Species of hydrozoan

Diphyes antarctica is a species of siphonophores in the family Diphyidae.
