= Lensia =

Scientific classification
- Kingdom: Animalia
- Phylum: Cnidaria
- Class: Hydrozoa
- Order: Siphonophorae
- Family: Diphyidae
- Genus: Lensia; Totton, 1932

Genus of hydrozoans

Lensia is a genus of hydrozoans belonging to the order Siphonoporae and the family Diphyidae. This genus is colonial and consists of many different types of highly specialized zooids. The genus Lensia was first established in 1932 by Dr. Arthur Knyvett Totton, who would also describe and add another 11 species during his career. As of March 2023, the genus consists of only 26 described and accepted species and an additional seven uncertain species, according to the World Register of Marine Species.

== Morphology ==
=== Clades ===
The genus Lensia is broken down into two clades separated by anatomical differences in their nectophore; the two clades are 5-ridged and 7-ridged, which indicates the number of ridges on their nectophore when they are in their eudoxid stage. The 5-ridged Lensia consist of those with 5 ridges that join at the apex of the nectophore, creating a pentagonal shape. In contrast, the 7-ridges Lensia consists of those with 5 weak ridges that do not join at the apex, 5 ridges that join at the apex with an additional 2 ridges not joining at the apex, more than 7 ridges, and finally 7 ridges at the apex.

=== Anatomical Organization ===
Species of the genus Lensia belong to the order Siphonophorae, composed of unique and highly specialized Zooids. Additionally, the suborder Calycophorae lack a pneumatophore, which is a gas filled zooid used to float and instead utilize oils within their somatocyst for floatation and nutritional storage. Furthermore, Since the genus Lensia belongs to the family Diphyidae, it is additionally characterized by the presence of two nectophores, which are linearly attached to the stalk. The stalk serves as the attachment point for the colony and is divided into two regions, the nectosome and the siphosome; the nectosome is responsible for propulsion, and contains the nectophores, and the siphosome is the attachment point for all other zooids in the colony.

Long chains of cormidia are attached to the siphosome in a species-specific pattern and typically consists of a gastrozooid with a single tentacle, one or more gonozooids, and a bract. In the genus Lensia, each tentacle has many branches called tentilla that consist of a pedicel, a nematocyst and a terminal filament. Each cormidia is capable of breaking away and becoming a free-living reproductive stage called a eudoxid.

=== Zooids ===
There are many types of specialized zooids that make up the genus Lensia, each zooid is an individual organism that is attached to the stalk and rely on each other for survival. Below is a general description of each type of zooid within the genus Lensia:

Gastrozooid - digestive zooid which uses tentacles containing toxins to paralyze, kill, and finally entangle prey for digestion by the gastrozooid.

Gonozooid - reproductive zooid that produces gonophores which undergo sexual reproduction and produces the larval form, restarting the lifecycle.

Nectophore - Asexual medusoid specialized for propulsion; lacking feeding and reproductive structures; typically two in lensia species.

=== Movement ===
Hydrozoans are distinct from other Cnidarians due to the presence of a velum. A velum is an addition of tissue surrounding the opening on the bottom of the nectophore that can be contracted, causing a jet of water that Hydrozoans use for propulsion. In Lensia, the siphosome region of the stem can be retracted into the hydroecium to reduce fluid resistance, resulting in more efficient swimming.

== Reproduction ==
Diphyidae is distinct from other Siphonophorae families due to their ability to alternate between sexual and asexual reproduction based on their life stages; they are asexual in the polygastric stage and exhibit sexual reproduction in the eudoxid stage.

== Feeding ==
Cnidarians are characterized by the presence of nematocysts which contain toxins and are used to paralyze and kill their prey. Many species of Lensia display diel vertical migration patterns, following their prey to the surface at night and returning to the edge of the daylight zone during the day.

== Distribution and habitat ==
This genus has a cosmopolitan distribution, meaning its species can be found anywhere within species-specific latitudes. Additionally, most species are found in either the epipelagic or mesopelagic zones.

== Species ==
=== Accepted Species ===
- Lensia achilles Totton, 1941
- Lensia ajax Totton, 1941
- Lensia asymmetrica Stepanjants, 1970
- Lensia campanella Moser, 1917
- Lensia challengeri Totton, 1954
- Lensia conoidea Keferstein & Ehlers, 1860
- Lensia cordata Totton, 1965
- Lensia cossack Totton, 1941
- Lensia exeter Totton & Leloup, 1941
- Lensia fowleri Bigelow, 1911
- Lensia gnanamuthui Daniel & Daniel, 1963
- Lensia grimaldii Leloup, 1933
- Lensia hardy Totton, 1941
- Lensia havock Totton, 1941
- Lensia hostile Totton, 1941
- Lensia hotspur Totton, 1941
- Lensia hunter Totton, 1941
- Lensia leloupi Totton, 1954
- Lensia lelouveteau Totton,1941
- Lensia meteori Leloup, 1934
- Lensia multicristata Moser, 1925
- Lensia panikkari Daniel, 1971
- Lensia quadriculata Pages, Flood, & Youngbluth, 2006
- Lensia subtilis Chun, 1886
- Lensia subtiloides Lens & Van Riemsdijk, 1908
- Lensia zenkevitchi Margulis, 1970

=== Uncertain Species ===
- Lensia beklemishevi Margulis & Alekseev, 1986
- Lensia lebedevi Alekseev, 1984
- Lensia minuta Patriti, 1970
- Lensia multilobata Rengarajan, 1973
- Lensia patritii Alekseev, 1984
- Lensia tiwarii Daniel, 1971
- Lensia tottoni Daniel & Daniel, 1963
