= Microphasmidae =

Scientific classification
- Domain: Eukaryota
- Kingdom: Animalia
- Phylum: Arthropoda
- Class: Malacostraca
- Order: Amphipoda
- Suborder: Hyperiidea
- Superfamily: Lanceoloidea
- Family: Microphasmidae

Synonyms
- Microphasmatidae

Family of crustaceans

Microphasmidae is a family of crustaceans belonging to the order Amphipoda.

Genera:

- Microphasma Woltereck, 1909
- Microphasmoides Vinogradov, 1960
