= Eudoxoides =

Scientific classification
- Kingdom: Animalia
- Phylum: Cnidaria
- Class: Hydrozoa
- Order: Siphonophorae
- Family: Diphyidae
- Genus: Eudoxoides; Huxley, 1859

Genus of hydrozoans

Eudoxoides is a genus of hydrozoans belonging to the family Diphyidae. It was first described by Huxley in 1859.

== Species ==
- Eudoxoides mitra Huxley, 1859
- Eudoxoides spiralis (Bigelow, 1911)

The genus has semi-cosmopolitan distribution.
