= Scinidae =

Scientific classification
- Domain: Eukaryota
- Kingdom: Animalia
- Phylum: Arthropoda
- Class: Malacostraca
- Order: Amphipoda
- Suborder: Hyperiidea
- Superfamily: Scinoidea
- Family: Scinidae

Synonyms
- Tyronidae

Family of crustaceans

Scinidae is a family of amphipods belonging to the order Amphipoda.

Genera:

- Acanthoscina Vosseler, 1900
- Ctenoscina Wagler, 1926
- Fortunata Chun, 1889
- Scina Prestandrea, 1833
- Spinoscina Bowman & Gruner, 1973
