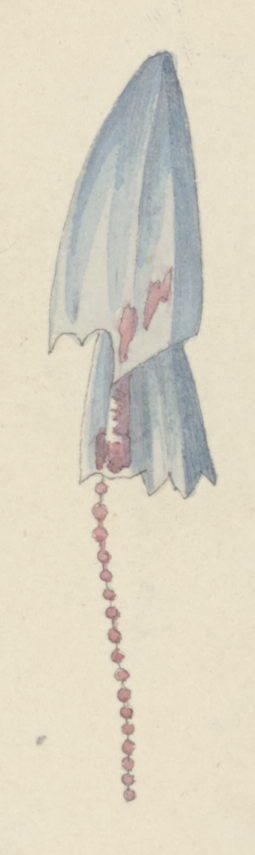

Scientific classification
- Kingdom: Animalia
- Phylum: Cnidaria
- Class: Hydrozoa
- Order: Siphonophorae
- Family: Diphyidae
- Genus: Diphyes
- Species: D. dispar

Binomial name
- Diphyes dispar Chamisso & Eysenhardt, 1821

Synonyms
- Diphyes boryi Blainville, 1830; Diphyes campanulifera Eschscholtz, 1829; Diphyopsis campanulifera (Eschscholtz, 1829); Diphyopsis compressa Haeckel, 1888; Diphyopsis dispar (Chamisso & Eysenhardt, 1821); Doramasia picta Chun, 1888; Ersaea angustata Agassiz & Mayer, 1902; Ersaea campanulifera (Eschscholtz, 1829); Ersaea compressa Haeckel, 1888; Ersaea dispar (Chamisso & Eysenhardt, 1821); Ersaea gaimardi Eschscholtz, 1829; Ersaea lessonii (Eschscholtz, 1829); Eudoxia lessonii Eschscholtz, 1829

= Diphyes dispar =

Species of hydrozoan

Diphyes dispar is a species of siphonophores in the family Diphyidae.
