= Anapronoe =

Scientific classification
- Domain: Eukaryota
- Kingdom: Animalia
- Phylum: Arthropoda
- Class: Malacostraca
- Order: Amphipoda
- Suborder: Hyperiidea
- Family: Anapronoidae
- Genus: Anapronoe; Stephensen, 1925

Genus of crustaceans

Anapronoe is a genus of crustaceans belonging to the monotypic family Anapronoidae.

The species of this genus are found in the Central Atlantic Ocean.

Species:

- Anapronoe bowmani Zeidler, 1997
- Anapronoe reinhardti Stephensen, 1925
