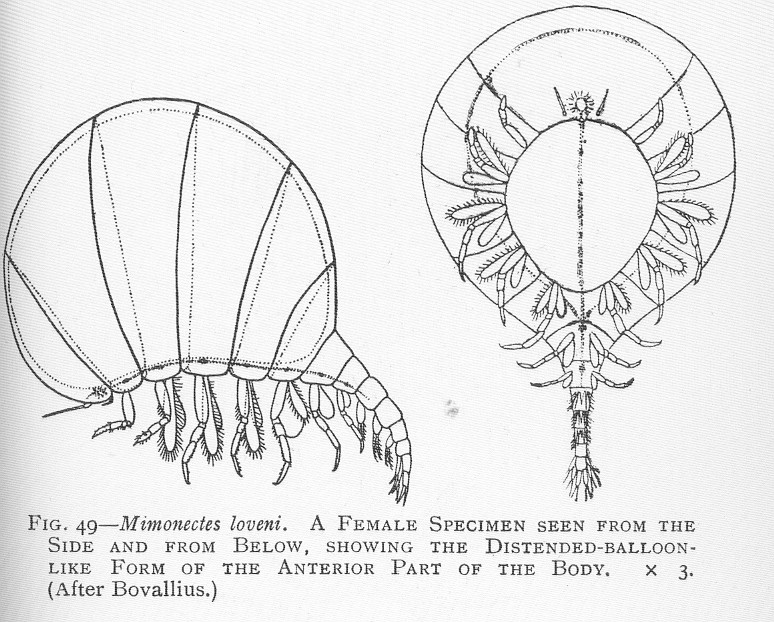
- Drawing of a female Mimonecles loveni from the side and below

Scientific classification
- Domain: Eukaryota
- Kingdom: Animalia
- Phylum: Arthropoda
- Class: Malacostraca
- Order: Amphipoda
- Suborder: Hyperiidea
- Superfamily: Scinoidea
- Family: Mimonectidae

Synonyms
- Proscinidae Pirlot, 1933

= Mimonectidae =

Family of crustaceans

Mimonectidae is a family of amphipods belonging to the order Amphipoda.

Genera:

- Cheloscina Shih & Hendrycks, 1996
- Mimonectes Bovallius, 1885
- Pseudomimonectes Vinogradov, 1960
