= Diphyes chamissonis =

Scientific classification
- Kingdom: Animalia
- Phylum: Cnidaria
- Class: Hydrozoa
- Order: Siphonophorae
- Family: Diphyidae
- Genus: Diphyes
- Species: D. chamissonis

Binomial name
- Diphyes chamissonis Huxley, 1859

Synonyms
- Diphyopsis chamissonis (Huxley, 1859); Diphyopsis weberi Lens & Van Riemsdijk, 1908

Species of hydrozoan

Diphyes chamissonis is a species of siphonophores in the family Diphyidae.
