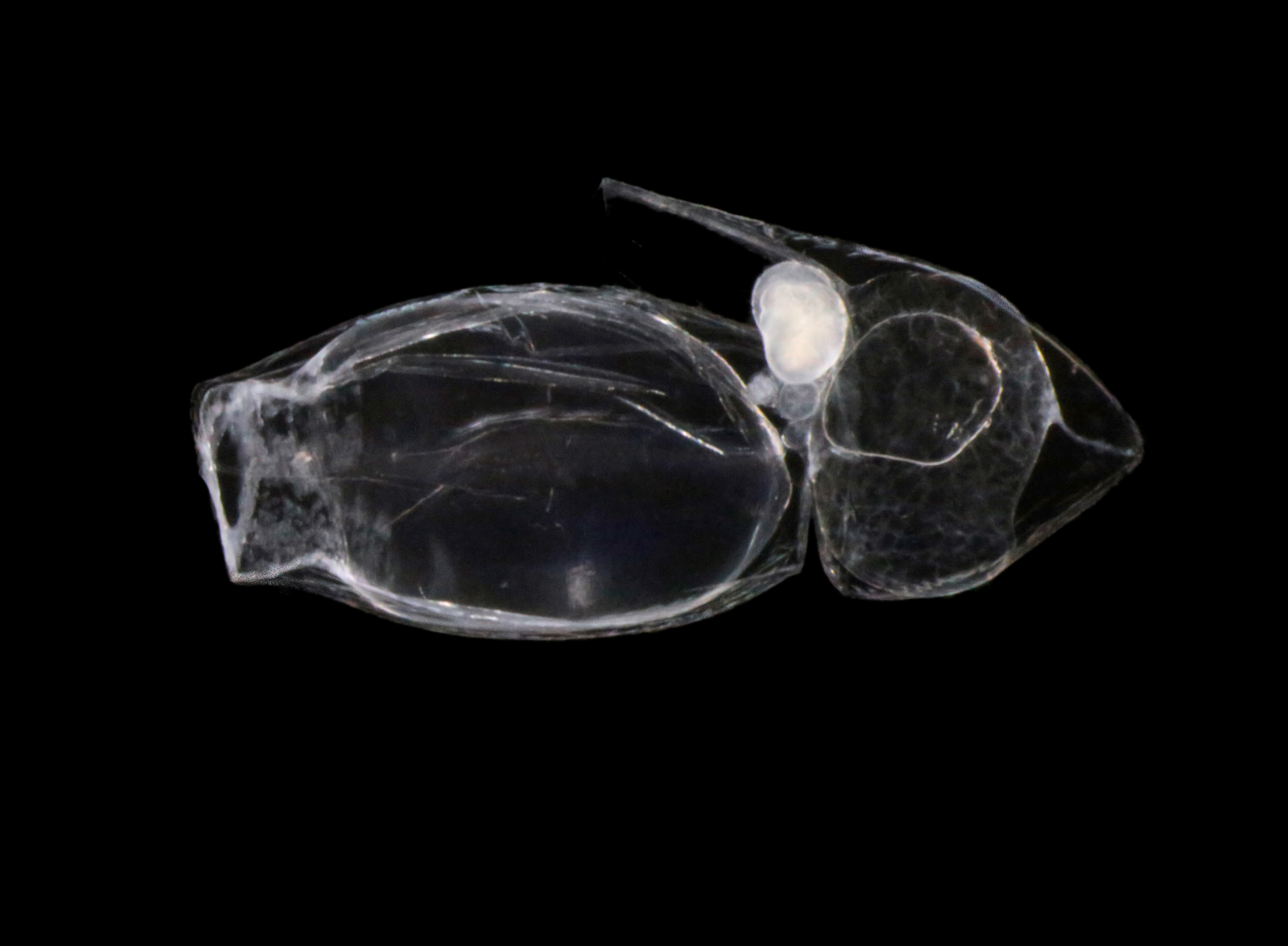
- Dimophyes arctica

Scientific classification
- Kingdom: Animalia
- Phylum: Cnidaria
- Class: Hydrozoa
- Order: Siphonophorae
- Family: Diphyidae
- Genus: Dimophyes; Moser, 1925
- Species: D. arctica

Binomial name
- Dimophyes arctica (Chun, 1897)

= Dimophyes =

Monotypic genus of hydrozoans

Dimophyes is a monotypic genus of hydrozoans belonging to the family Diphyidae. The only species is Dimophyes arctica.

The species has cosmopolitan distribution.
