= Lycaeopsis =

Scientific classification
- Domain: Eukaryota
- Kingdom: Animalia
- Phylum: Arthropoda
- Class: Malacostraca
- Order: Amphipoda
- Suborder: Hyperiidea
- Family: Lycaeopsidae
- Genus: Lycaeopsis; Claus, 1879

Genus of crustaceans

Lycaeopsis is a genus of crustaceans belonging to the monotypic family Lycaeopsidae.

The species of this genus are found in America and New Zealand.

Species:

- Lycaeopsis themistoides Claus, 1879
- Lycaeopsis zamboangae (Stebbing, 1888)
