= Diphyes bojani =

Scientific classification
- Kingdom: Animalia
- Phylum: Cnidaria
- Class: Hydrozoa
- Order: Siphonophorae
- Family: Diphyidae
- Genus: Diphyes
- Species: D. bojani

Binomial name
- Diphyes bojani Eschscholtz, 1825

Synonyms
- Diphyes serrata Chun, 1888; Diphyes steenstrupi Gegenbaur, 1859; Diphyopsis bojani (Eschscholtz, 1825); Ersaea bojani Chun, 1888; Ersaea picta Chun, 1892; Eudoxia bojani Eschscholtz, 1825; Eudoxia serrata Chun, 1888

Species of hydrozoan

Diphyes bojani is a species of siphonophores in the family Diphyidae.
