= Tryphanidae =

Scientific classification
- Domain: Eukaryota
- Kingdom: Animalia
- Phylum: Arthropoda
- Class: Malacostraca
- Order: Amphipoda
- Suborder: Hyperiidea
- Superfamily: Platysceloidea
- Family: Tryphanidae

Family of crustaceans

Tryphanidae is a family of amphipods belonging to the order Amphipoda.

Genera:

- Tryphana Boeck, 1871
