= Phrosinidae =

Scientific classification
- Domain: Eukaryota
- Kingdom: Animalia
- Phylum: Arthropoda
- Class: Malacostraca
- Order: Amphipoda
- Suborder: Hyperiidea
- Superfamily: Phronimoidea
- Family: Phrosinidae

Family of crustaceans

Phrosinidae is a family of amphipods belonging to the order Amphipoda.

Genera:

- Anchylomera Milne Edwards, 1830
- Euprimnus Fraser, 1961
- Hieraconyx Guérin, 1838
- Phrosina Risso, 1822
- Primno Guérin-Méneville, 1836
