= Paraphronima =

Scientific classification
- Domain: Eukaryota
- Kingdom: Animalia
- Phylum: Arthropoda
- Class: Malacostraca
- Order: Amphipoda
- Suborder: Hyperiidea
- Family: Paraphronimidae
- Genus: Paraphronima; Claus, 1879

Genus of crustaceans

Paraphronima is a genus of crustaceans belonging to the monotypic family Paraphronimidae.

The genus has almost cosmopolitan distribution.

Species:

- Paraphronima crassipes Claus, 1879
- Paraphronima gracilis Claus, 1879
