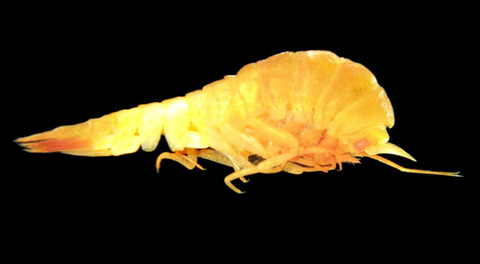

Scientific classification
- Domain: Eukaryota
- Kingdom: Animalia
- Phylum: Arthropoda
- Class: Malacostraca
- Order: Amphipoda
- Suborder: Hyperiidea
- Superfamily: Lanceoloidea
- Family: Lanceolidae

= Lanceolidae =

Family of crustaceans

Lanceolidae is a family of amphipods belonging to the order Amphipoda.

Genera:

- Lanceola Say, 1818
- Scypholanceola Woltereck, 1905
