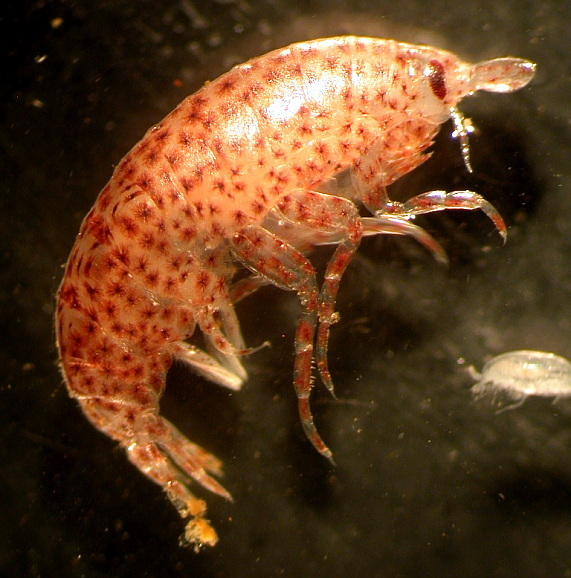
- Vibilia propinqua

Scientific classification
- Domain: Eukaryota
- Kingdom: Animalia
- Phylum: Arthropoda
- Class: Malacostraca
- Order: Amphipoda
- Suborder: Hyperiidea
- Superfamily: Vibilioidea
- Family: Vibiliidae; Dana, 1852

Synonyms
- Rhabdochiridae

= Vibiliidae =

Family of crustaceans

Vibiliidae is a family of amphipods belonging to the order Amphipoda.

Genera:

- Vibilia Milne Edwards, 1830
- Vibilioides Chevreux, 1905
