= Platyscelidae =

Scientific classification
- Domain: Eukaryota
- Kingdom: Animalia
- Phylum: Arthropoda
- Class: Malacostraca
- Order: Amphipoda
- Suborder: Hyperiidea
- Superfamily: Platysceloidea
- Family: Platyscelidae

Family of crustaceans

Platyscelidae is a family of amphipods belonging to the order Amphipoda.

Genera:

- Dithyrus Dana, 1852
- Hemityphis Claus, 1879
- Paratyphis Claus, 1879
- Platyscelus Spence Bate, 1861
- Tetrathyrus Claus, 1879
