= Chelophyes =

Scientific classification
- Domain: Eukaryota
- Kingdom: Animalia
- Phylum: Cnidaria
- Class: Hydrozoa
- Order: Siphonophorae
- Family: Diphyidae
- Genus: Chelophyes; Totton, 1932

Genus of hydrozoans

Chelophyes is a genus of hydrozoans belonging to the family Diphyidae.

Species:

- Chelophyes appendiculata (Eschscholtz, 1829)
- Chelophyes contorta (Lens & van Riemsdijk, 1908)
