= Pronoidae =

Scientific classification
- Domain: Eukaryota
- Kingdom: Animalia
- Phylum: Arthropoda
- Class: Malacostraca
- Order: Amphipoda
- Suborder: Hyperiidea
- Superfamily: Platysceloidea
- Family: Pronoidae

Family of crustaceans

Pronoidae is a family of amphipods belonging to the order Amphipoda.

Genera:

- Eupronoe Claus, 1879
- Paralycaea Claus, 1879
- Parapronoe Claus, 1879
- Pronoe Guérin-Méneville, 1836
