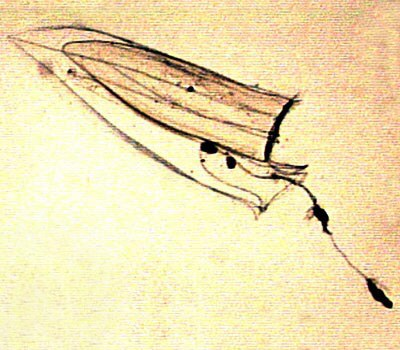
- Muggiaea atlantica

Scientific classification
- Kingdom: Animalia
- Phylum: Cnidaria
- Class: Hydrozoa
- Order: Siphonophorae
- Family: Diphyidae
- Genus: Muggiaea; Busch, 1851

Species
- See text

= Muggiaea =

Genus of hydrozoans

Muggiaea is a genus of siphonophores in the family Diphyidae. Members of this family are colonial siphonophores with two nectophores (swimming bells) arranged one behind the other, but in the genus Muggiaea, the posterior nectophore is absent. The anterior one has a complete dorsal ridge. The somatocyst (extension of the gastrovascular system) is very close to the nectosac (central cavity with muscular walls) wall.

== Species ==
The World Register of Marine Species includes the following species in the genus:

- Muggiaea atlantica Cunningham, 1892
- Muggiaea bargmannae Totton, 1954
- Muggiaea delsmani Totton, 1954
- Muggiaea kochii (Will, 1844)
