= Eudoxoides mitra =

Scientific classification
- Kingdom: Animalia
- Phylum: Cnidaria
- Class: Hydrozoa
- Order: Siphonophorae
- Family: Diphyidae
- Genus: Eudoxoides
- Species: E. mitra

Binomial name
- Eudoxoides mitra Huxley, 1859

Synonyms
- Diphyes mitra Huxley, 1859; Diphyopsis mitra (Huxley, 1859)

Species of cnidarian

Eudoxoides mitra is a species of Hydrozoa in the family Diphyidae. It was first described by Huxley in 1859.
