= Parascelidae =

Scientific classification
- Kingdom: Animalia
- Phylum: Arthropoda
- Class: Malacostraca
- Order: Amphipoda
- Suborder: Hyperiidea
- Superfamily: Platysceloidea
- Family: Parascelidae

Family of crustaceans

Parascelidae is a family of crustaceans belonging to the order Amphipoda.

Genera:

- Eusceliotes Stebbing, 1888
- Hemiscelus
- Parascelus Claus, 1879
- Schizoscelus Claus, 1879
- Thyropus Dana, 1852
