= Eudoxoides spiralis =

Scientific classification
- Kingdom: Animalia
- Phylum: Cnidaria
- Class: Hydrozoa
- Order: Siphonophorae
- Family: Diphyidae
- Genus: Eudoxoides
- Species: E. spiralis

Binomial name
- Eudoxoides spiralis Bigelow, 1911

Synonyms
- Diphyes spiralis Bigelow, 1911; Muggiaea spiralis (Bigelow, 1911)

Species of cnidarian

Eudoxoides spiralis is a species of Hydrozoa in the family Diphyidae. It was first described by Bigelow in 1911.
