= Lycaeidae =

Scientific classification
- Domain: Eukaryota
- Kingdom: Animalia
- Phylum: Arthropoda
- Class: Malacostraca
- Order: Amphipoda
- Suborder: Hyperiidea
- Superfamily: Platysceloidea
- Family: Lycaeidae

Family of crustaceans

Lycaeidae is a family of crustaceans belonging to the order Amphipoda.

Genera:

- Lycaea Dana, 1852
- Simorhynchotus Stebbing, 1888
