= Diphyes (cnidarian) =

Scientific classification
- Kingdom: Animalia
- Phylum: Cnidaria
- Class: Hydrozoa
- Order: Siphonophorae
- Family: Diphyidae
- Subfamily: Diphyinae
- Genus: Diphyes; Cuvier, 1817

Genus of hydrozoans

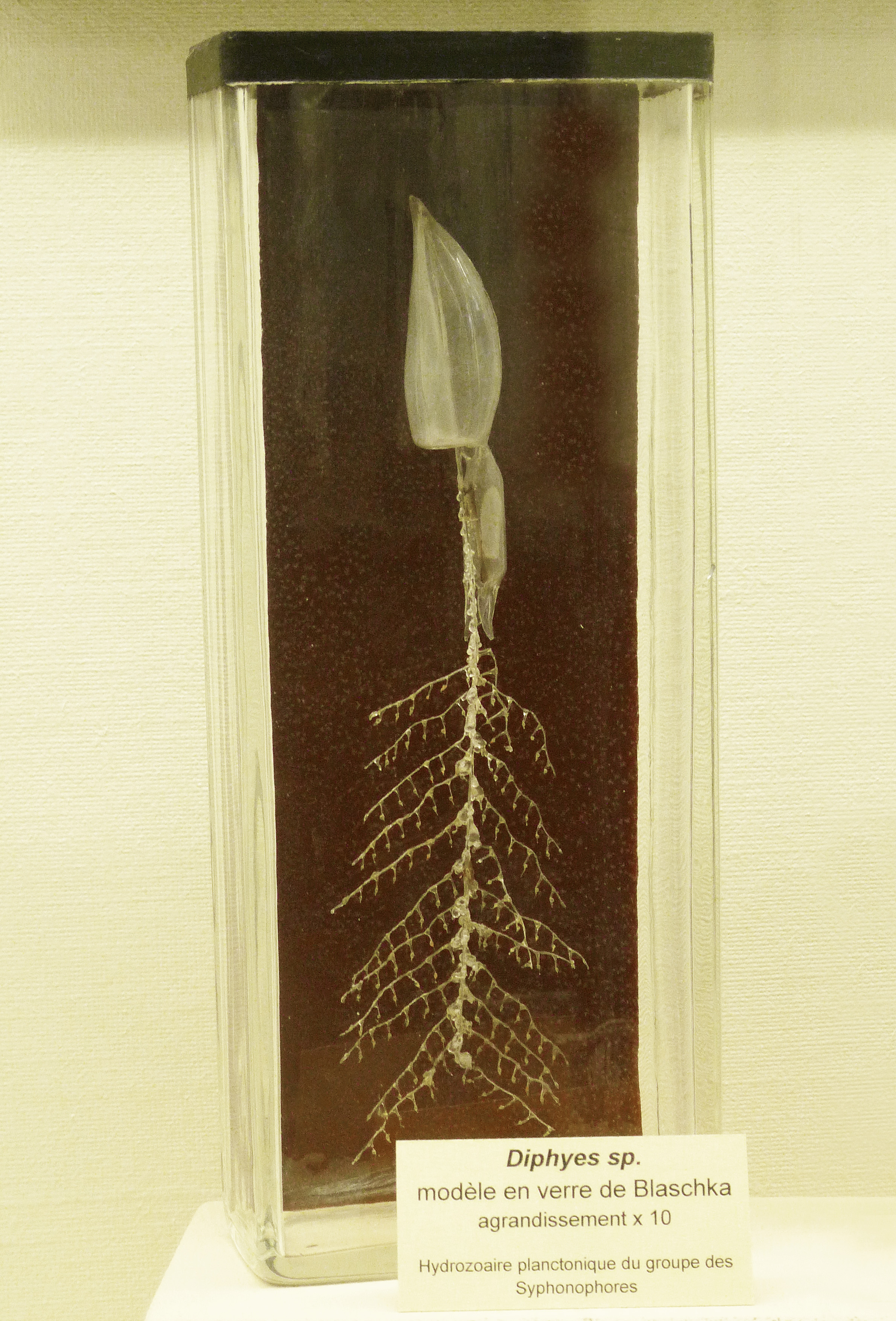
Diphyes sp., at the Strasbourg Zoological Museum

Diphyes is a genus of hydrozoans belonging to the family Diphyidae.

The genus has cosmopolitan distribution.

Species:

- Diphyes antarctica Moser, 1925
- Diphyes bojani (Eschscholtz, 1825)
- Diphyes chamissonis Huxley, 1859
- Diphyes dispar Chamisso & Eysenhardt, 1821
