= Oxycephalidae =

Scientific classification
- Domain: Eukaryota
- Kingdom: Animalia
- Phylum: Arthropoda
- Class: Malacostraca
- Order: Amphipoda
- Suborder: Hyperiidea
- Superfamily: Platysceloidea
- Family: Oxycephalidae

Family of crustaceans

Oxycephalidae is a family of crustaceans belonging to the order Amphipoda.

== Genera ==
According to WoRMS:

- Calamorhynchus Streets, 1878
- Cranocephalus Bovallius, 1890
- Glossocephalus Bovallius, 1887
- Leptocotis Streets, 1877
- Oxycephalus H. Milne Edwards, 1830 [=Orio Cocco, 1832]
- Rhabdosoma White, 1847 [=Macrocephalus Spence Bate, 1858; Rhabdonectes Bovalius, 1887; Xiphocephalus Bovallius, 1890]
- Streetsia Stebbing, 1888
- Tullbergella Bovallius, 1887
