= Bougisia =

Bougisia ornata

Scientific classification
- Kingdom: Animalia
- Phylum: Arthropoda
- Clade: Pancrustacea
- Class: Malacostraca
- Order: Amphipoda
- Family: Bougisidae; Zeidler, 2004
- Genus: Bougisia; Laval, 1966
- Species: B. ornata

Binomial name
- Bougisia ornata Laval, 1966

Family of crustaceans

Bougisia is a genus of plankton in the sub-order Hyperiidea–a type of so-called "hyperid" amphipoda. The genus Bougisia is the only subordinate taxon in the monotypic family Bougisidae. The genus Bougisia is also monotypic, being represented by the single species, Bougisia ornata. This species lives as plankton in tropical and sub-tropical salt water. Hyperiidea species normally have a physique that differs from other types of amphipod.

== Taxonomy ==
The taxonomy of the genus Bougisia is complicated, has been revised on a number of occasions, and different group affiliation is possible. Prior to 2004, the genera Iulopis and Bougisia were part of the family Hyperiidae, but Zeidler suggested creating two new families for the genera. The group's taxonomy was updated in 2013. A modern updating of the system is based on the 2013 revision with its basis in the WoRMS-database.
