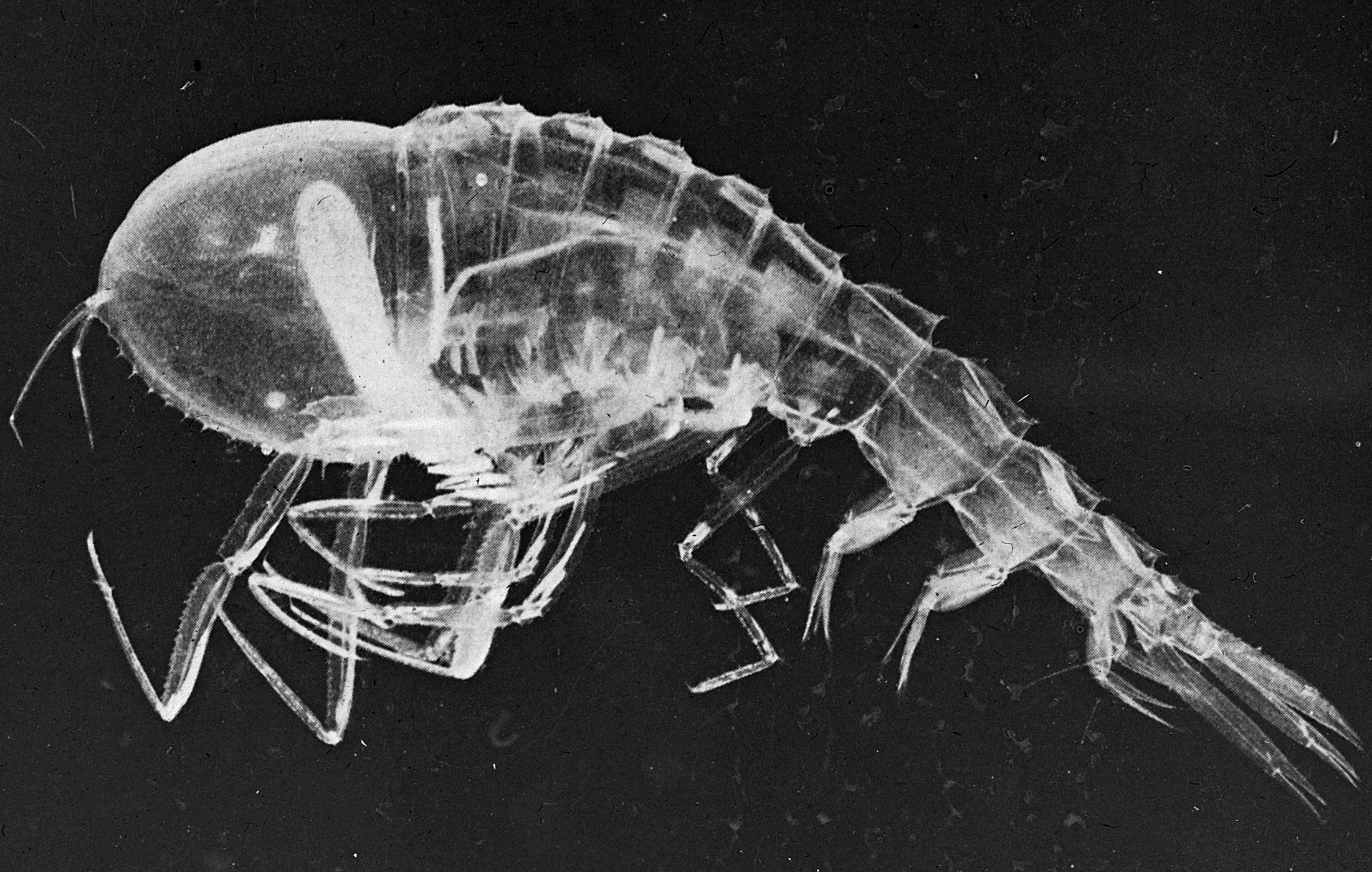
- Photograph of Cystisoma in lateral view
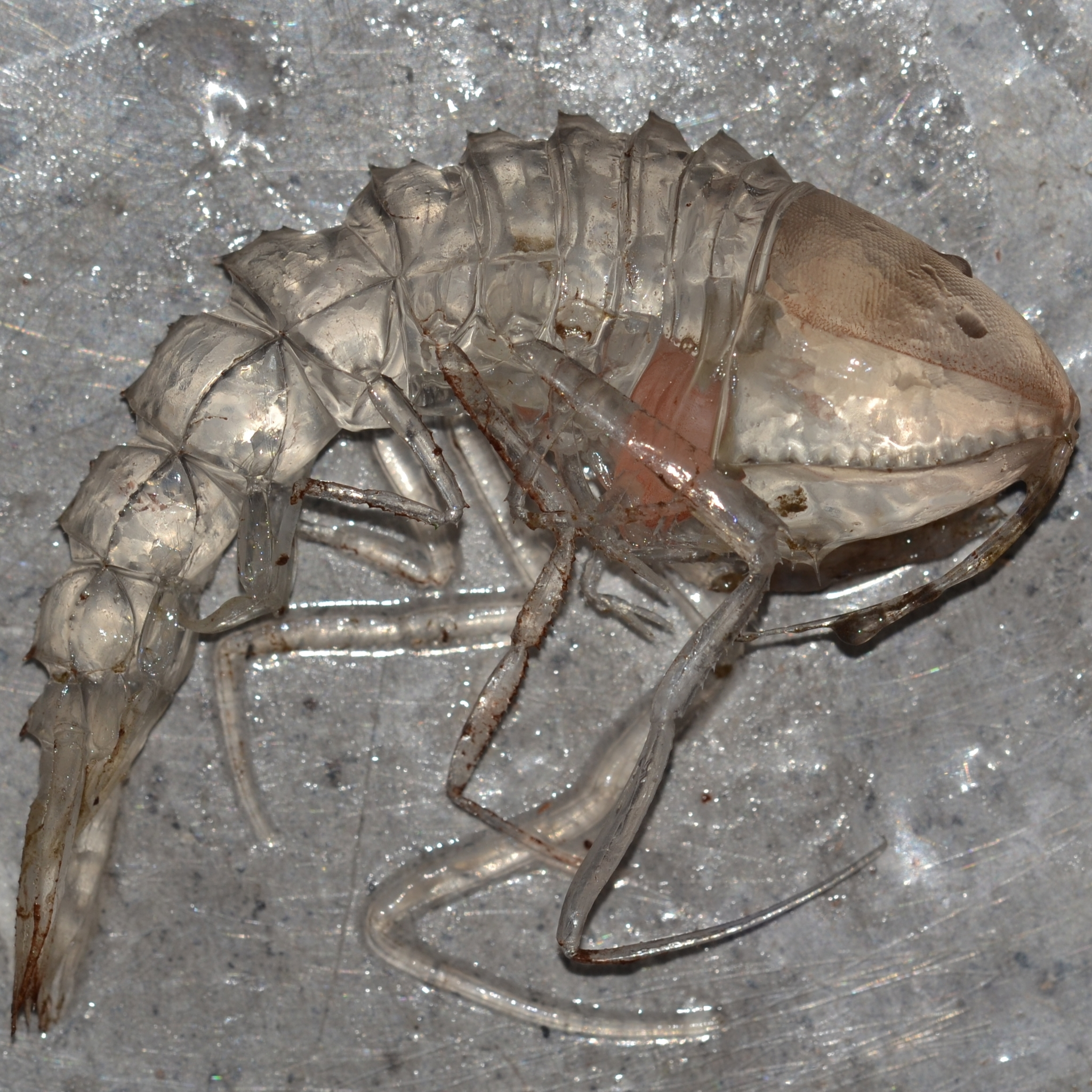
- Caught C. magna specimen collected in Hawaii

Scientific classification
- Kingdom: Animalia
- Phylum: Arthropoda
- Class: Malacostraca
- Order: Amphipoda
- Family: Cystisomatidae; Willemöes-Suhm, 1875
- Genus: Cystisoma; Guérin-Méneville, 1842

Synonyms
- Cysteosoma Bovallius; Cystosoma Spence Bate; Thaumatops Martens

= Cystisoma =

Genus of crustaceans

Cystisoma is a genus of amphipod. It is the only member of the family Cystisomatidae within the Hyperiidea. The genus is noted for its nearly completely transparent body, adapted for life in low light waters.

== Description ==
=== Gallery ===
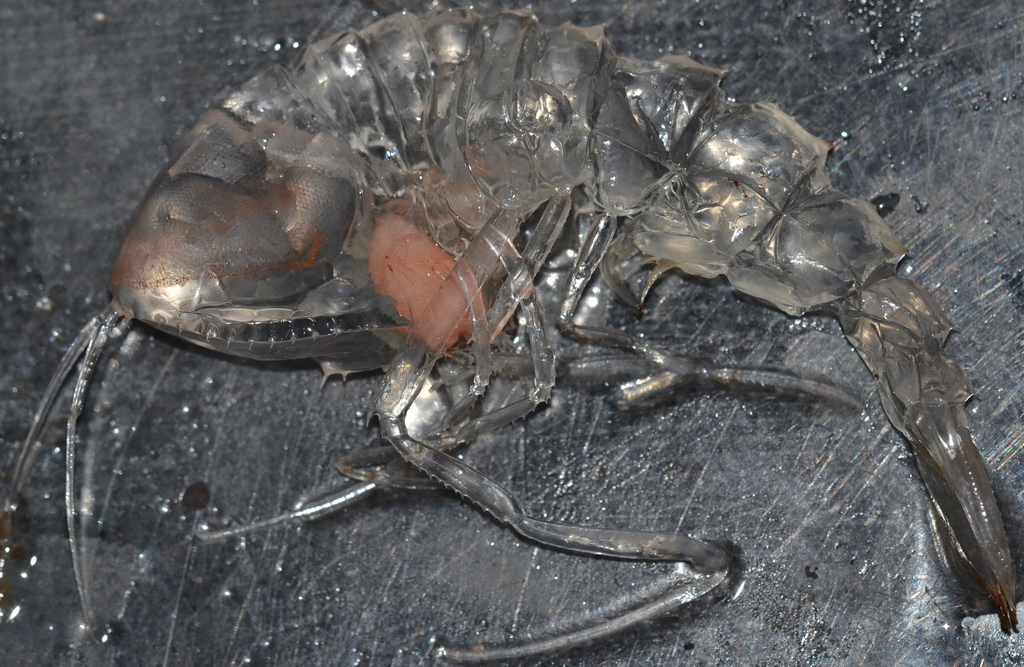
Specimen in side view

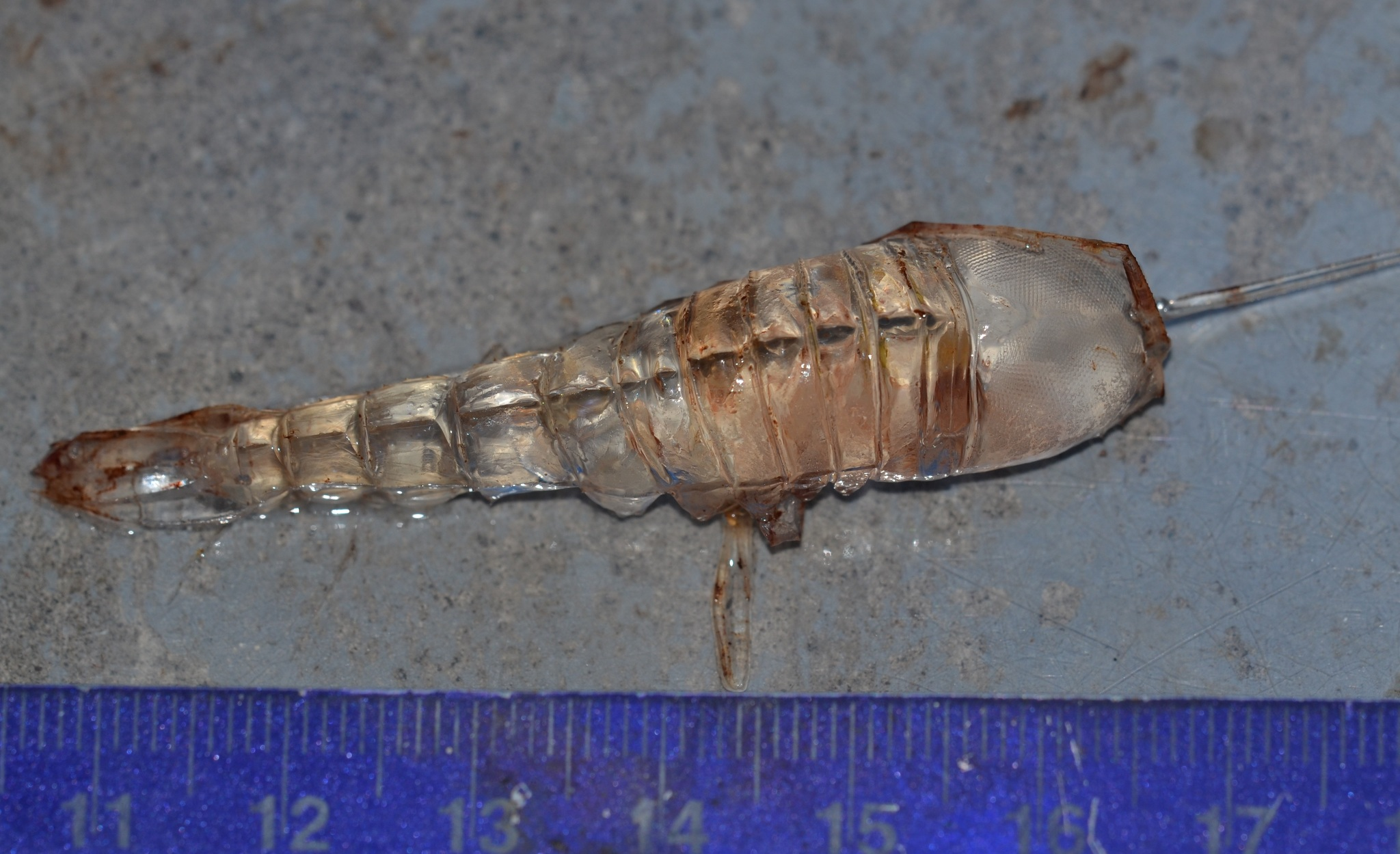
Specimen in dorsal view

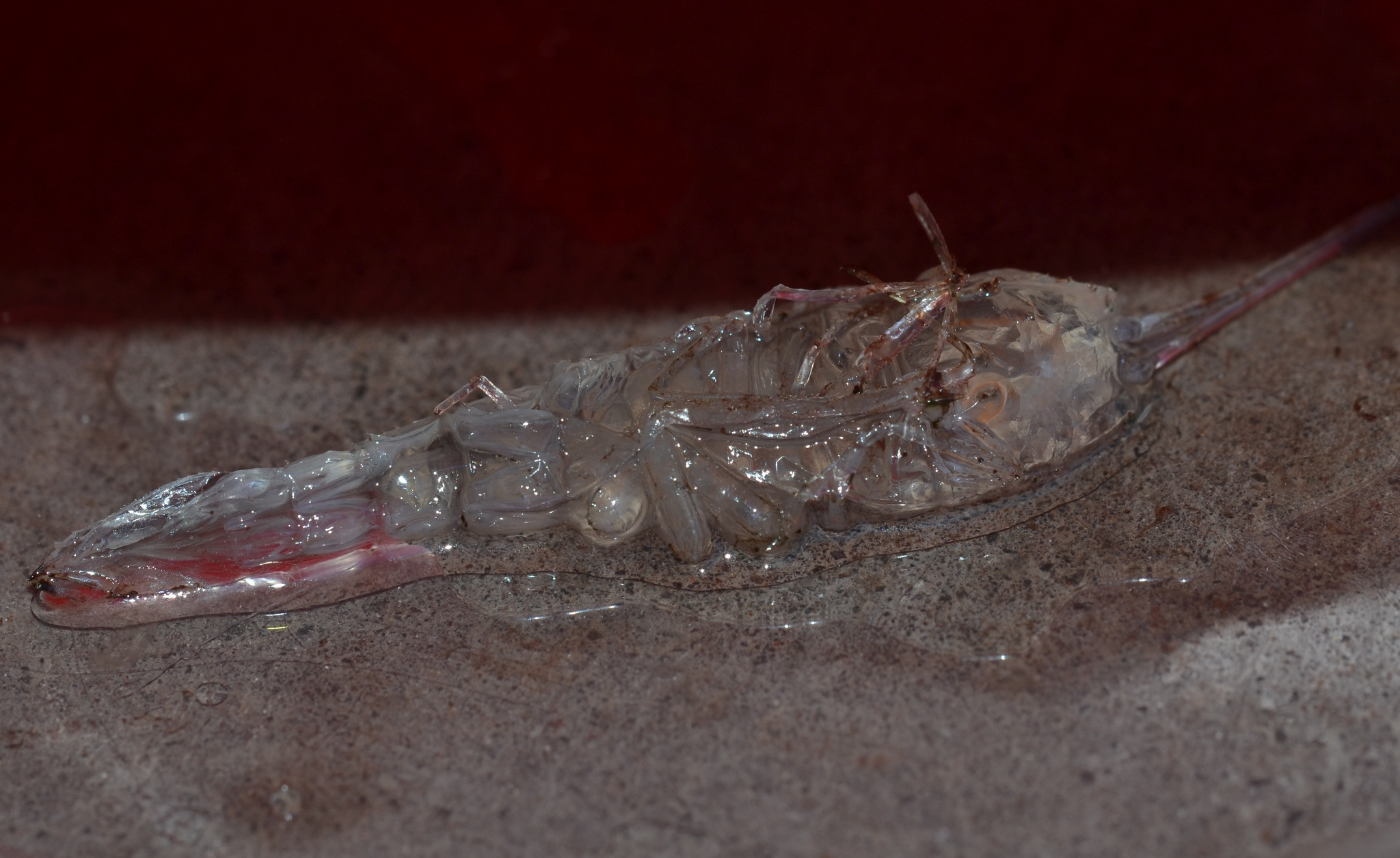
Underside view

Cystisoma are characterized by unpigmented, transparent bodies which render them essentially invisible in water unless under precisely angled lighting. Only their eyes are pigmented. There is only a single pair of eyes which are large and directed upwards, being spread into a thin sheet on the upper surface of the head. This is likely an adaption of life in the ocean depths, where the only major light source is from above.

Marine biologists at Duke University and the Smithsonian analyzed the crustacean's shell and discovered that it was covered in microscopic spheres that significantly reduce reflected light, thus giving the organism an antireflective coating. The spheres are believed to be bacteria due to their morphology and method of reproduction. Minute structures called nanoprotuberances were also observed on the Cystisoma's body, notably on the organism's legs. Researchers believe that they act as a buffer between light and the amphipod's body, significantly reducing surface reflection.

=== Size ===
Cystisoma are the largest of hyperiids, reaching lengths over 100 mm.

== Distribution ==
Cystisoma inhabit the dim epipelagic and mesopelagic zones. They can be found in all of the world's oceans. They appear to be freely swimming organisms and unlike other hyperiids, do not appear to be closely associated with salps.

== Species ==
- Cystisoma fabricii (Stebbing, 1888)
- Cystisoma gershwinae (Zeidler, 2003)
- Cystisoma latipes (Stephensen, 1918)
- Cystisoma longipes (Bovallius, 1886)
- Cystisoma magna (Woltereck, 1903)
- Cystisoma pellucida (Willemöes-Suhm, 1873)
