= Chuneola =

Scientific classification
- Kingdom: Animalia
- Phylum: Arthropoda
- Class: Malacostraca
- Order: Amphipoda
- Family: Chuneolidae
- Genus: Chuneola; Woltereck, 1909

Family of crustaceans

Chuneola is a genus of crustaceans belonging to the monotypic family Chuneolidae.

The species of this genus are found in the southernmost Southern Hemisphere.

Species:

- Chuneola major Vinogradov, 1957
- Chuneola paradoxa Woltereck, 1909
- Chuneola parasitica
- Chuneola spinifera Vinogradov, 1960
