= Henri Milne-Edwards =

French zoologist (1800–1885)

Henri Milne-Edwards ForMemRS
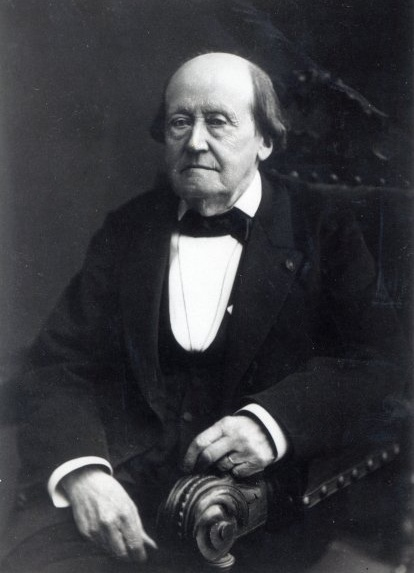
- Born: 23 October 1800; Bruges, French First Republic
- Died: 29 July 1885 (aged 84); Paris, French Third Republic
- Education: University of Paris
- Awards: Copley Medal (1856)
- Scientific career
- Fields: Zoology
- Academic advisors: Georges Cuvier
- Author abbrev. (zoology): Milne-Edwards

Henri Milne-Edwards (23 October 1800 – 29 July 1885) was a French zoologist.

== Biography ==
Henri Milne-Edwards was the 27th child of William Edwards, an English planter and colonel of the militia in Jamaica and Elisabeth Vaux, a Frenchwoman. Henri was born in Bruges, in present-day Belgium, where his parents had retired; Bruges was then a part of the newborn French Republic. His father had been jailed for several years for helping some Englishmen in their escape to their country. Henri spent most of his life in France. He was brought up in Paris by his older brother Guillaume Frederic Edwards (1777–1842), a distinguished physiologist and ethnologist. His father was released after the fall of Napoleon. The whole family then moved to Paris.

At first he turned his attention to medicine, in which he graduated as an MD at Paris in 1823. His passion for natural history soon prevailed, and he gave himself up to the study of the lower forms of animal life. He became a student of Georges Cuvier and befriended Jean Victoire Audouin.

He married Laura Trézel. They had nine children, including the biologist Alphonse Milne-Edwards.

=== Name ===
Originally the name Milne was one of the first names of Henri, but, to avoid confusion with his numerous relatives, he added it to his surname Edwards. He usually wrote it as "Milne Edwards", whilst his son Alphonse always used "Milne-Edwards". In taxon-authorship, the hyphenated name "Milne-Edwards" is most often used for both father and son.

== Works ==
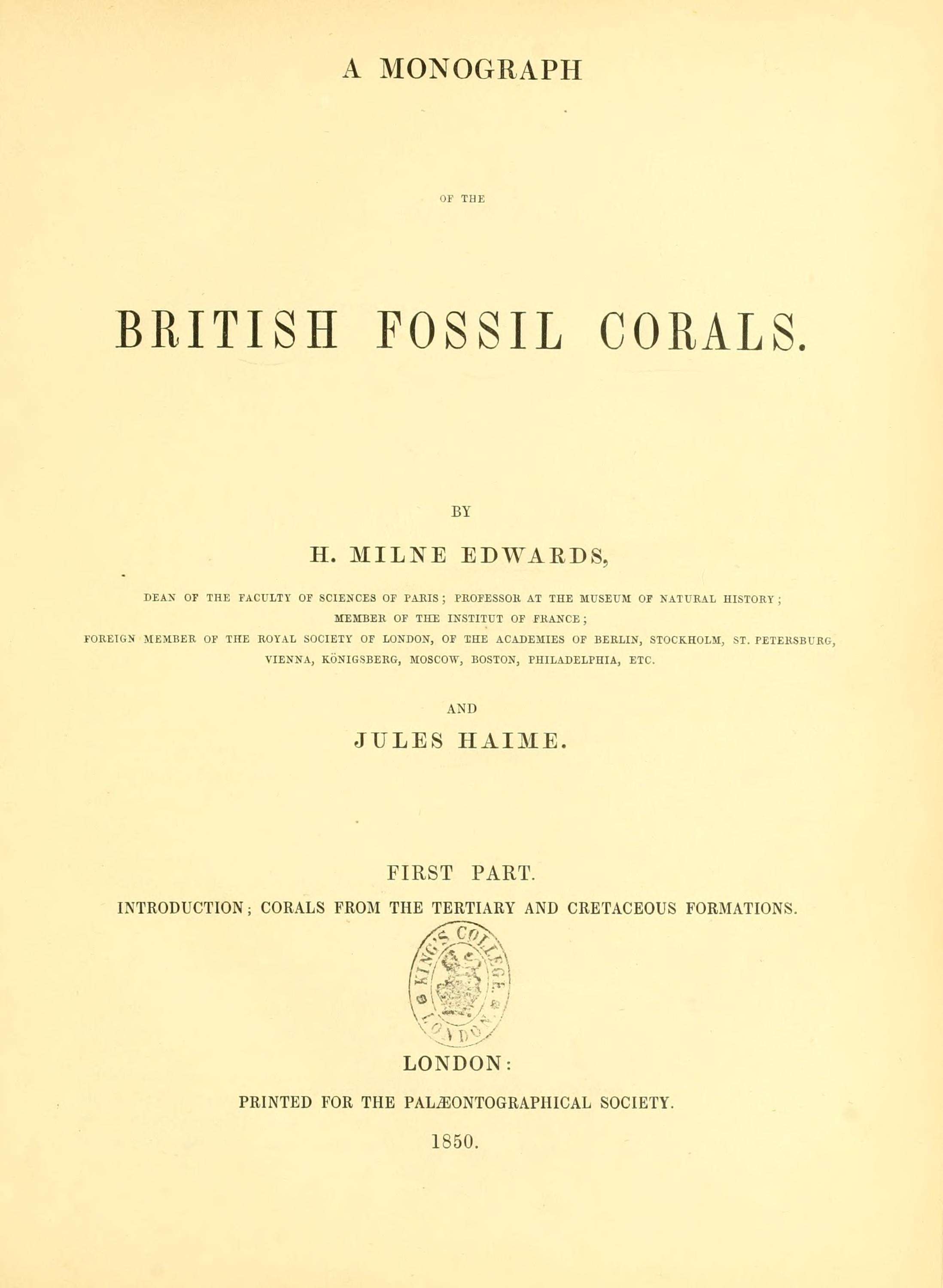
A monograph of the British fossil corals by H. Milne Edwards and Jules Haime.

One of his earliest papers (Recherches anatomiques sur les crustacés), which was presented to the French Academy of Sciences in 1829, formed the theme of an elaborate and eulogistic report by Cuvier in the following year. It embodied the results of two dredging expeditions undertaken by him and his friend Audouin during 1826 and 1828 in the neighbourhood of Granville, and was remarkable for clearly distinguishing the marine fauna of that portion of the French coast into four zones.

Also in 1829, working in the scientific field of herpetology, he described and named five new species of lizards.

He became professor of hygiene and natural history in 1832 at the Collège Central des Arts et Manufactures. In 1841, after the death of Audouin, he succeeded him at the chair of entomology at the Muséum National d'Histoire Naturelle. In 1862 he succeeded Isidore Geoffroy Saint-Hilaire in the long-vacant chair of zoology.

Much of his original work was published in the Annales des sciences naturelles, with the editorship of which he was associated from 1834. Of his books may be mentioned the Histoire naturelle des Crustacés (3 vols., 1837–1841), which long remained a standard work; Histoire naturelle des coralliaires, published in 1858–1860, but begun many years before; Leçons sur la physiologie et l'anatomie comparée de l'homme et des animaux (1857–1881), in 14 volumes; and a little work on the elements of zoology, originally published in 1834, but subsequently remodelled, which enjoyed an enormous circulation.

In 1842, he was elected a foreign member of the Royal Society. The Royal Society in 1856 awarded him the Copley Medal in recognition of his zoological investigations. He was elected an international member of the American Philosophical Society in 1860. He died in Paris. His son, Alphonse Milne-Edwards (1835–1900), who became professor of ornithology at the museum in 1876, devoted himself especially to fossil birds and deep-sea exploration.

A diagram of the natural classification of vertebrate animals, from Milne-Edwards, 1844.

An important early classification scheme for vertebrates, diagrammed as a series of nested sets, was illustrated in Milne-Edwards (1844).

== Taxon described by him ==
- See Category:Taxa named by Henri Milne-Edwards

== Honour ==
Taxa named after
Henri Milne-Edwards

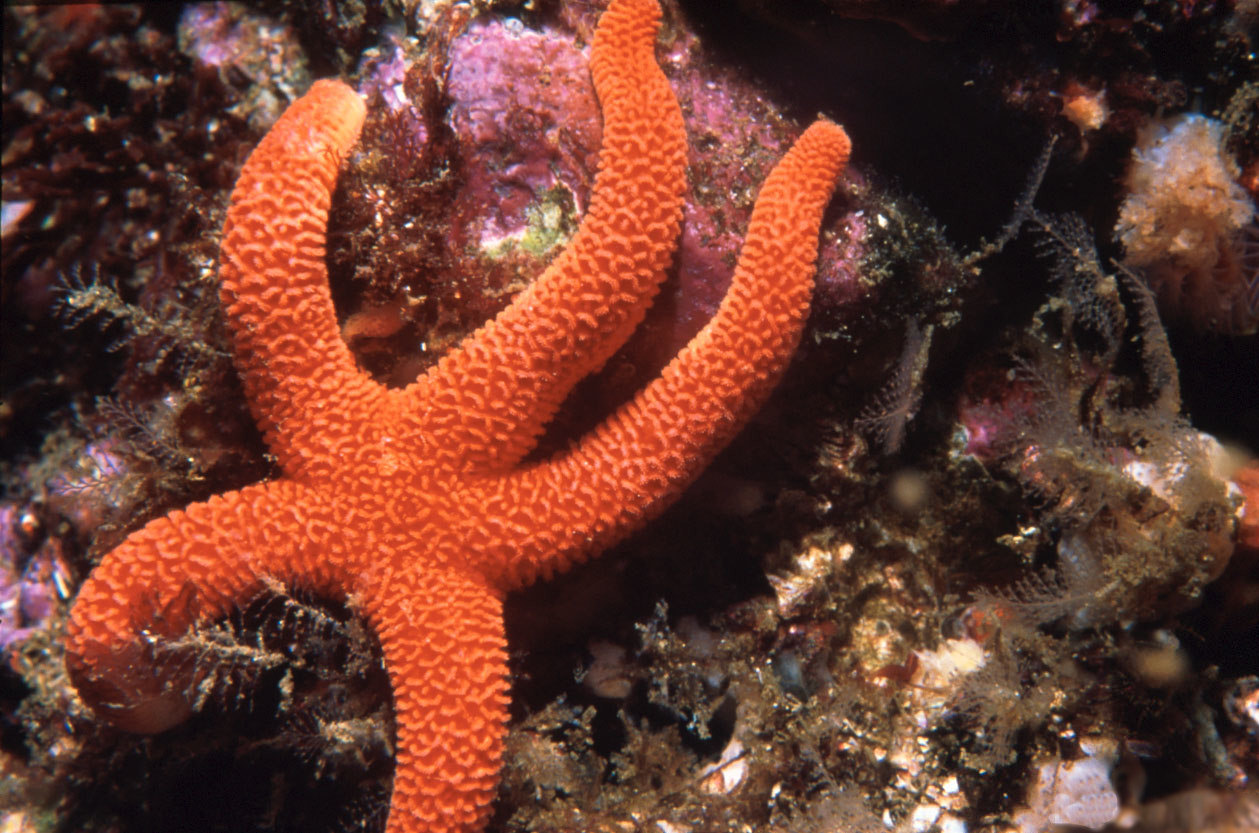
Blood star (Henricia leviuscula)

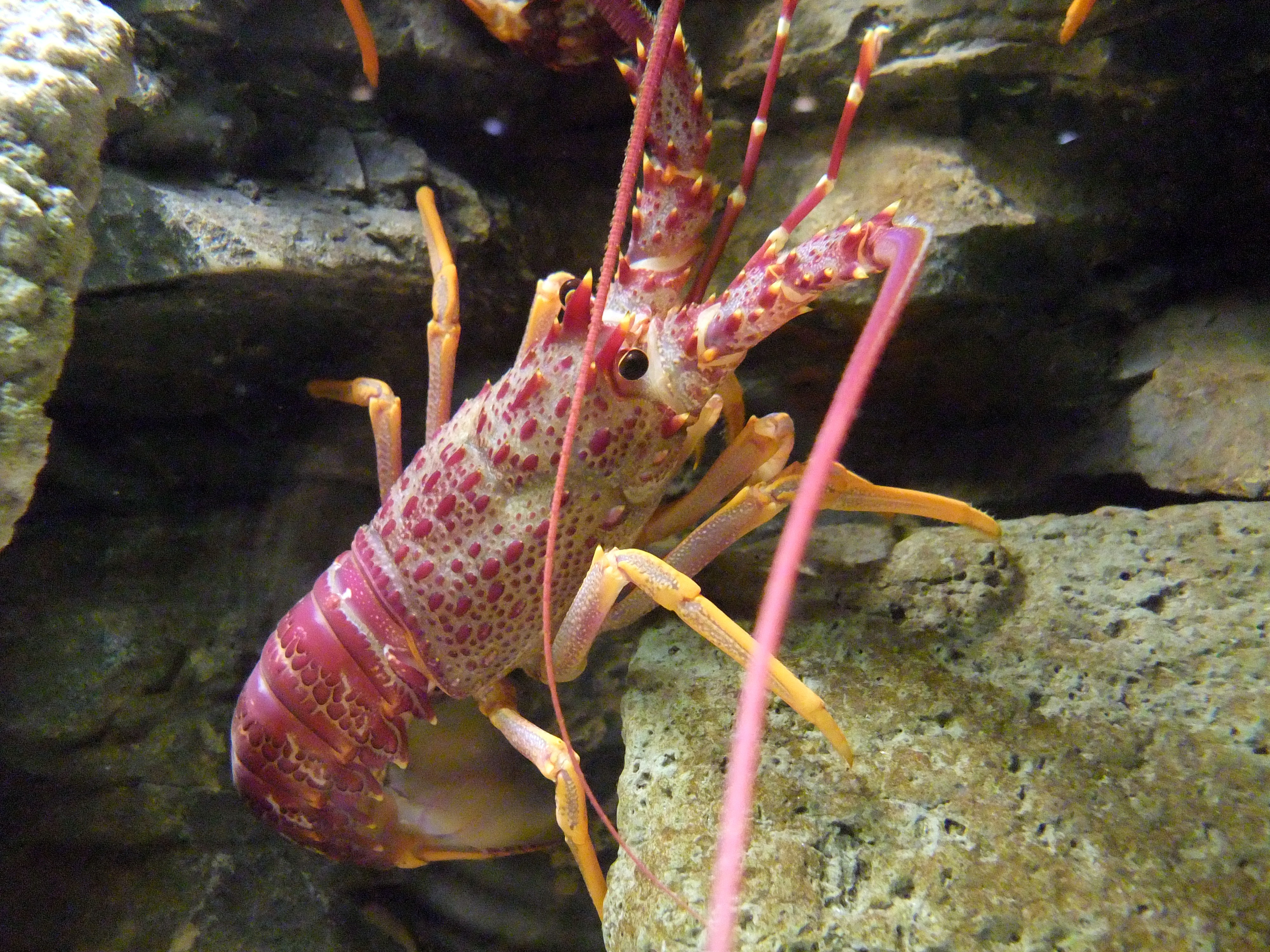
The southern rock lobster, Jasus edwardsii

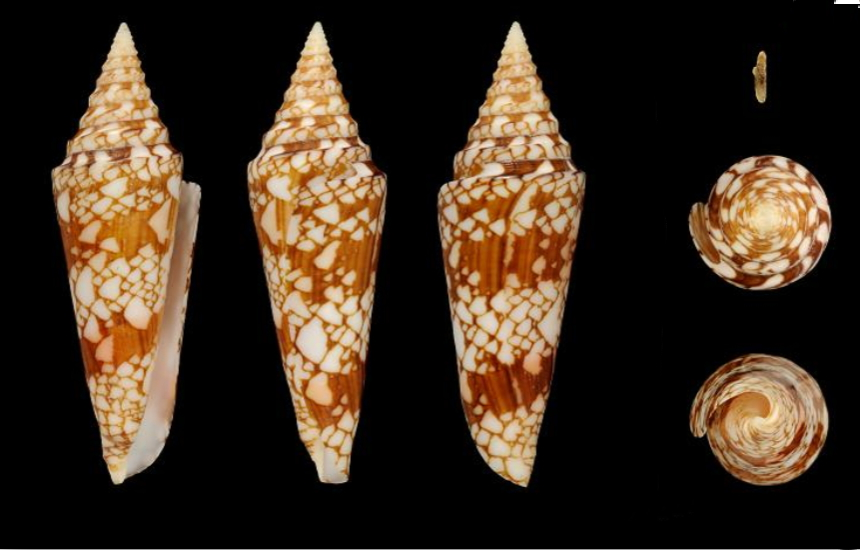
Conus milneedwardsi

The name of Henri Milne-Edwards is honoured in several names of genera and species, such as:

- Edwardsia (de Quatrefages, 1841)
- Edwardsiella (Andres, 1883)
- Henricia (J. E. Gray, 1840)
- Milneedwardsia (Bourguignat, 1877)
- Milnesium (Doyère, 1840)
- Alpheus edwardsii (Audouin, 1826)
- Archaeoniscus edwardsii (Westwood, 1854)
- Aristaeopsis edwardsiana (Johnson, 1868)
- Boeckosimus edwardsii (Krøyer, 1846)
- Calliostoma milneedwardsi (Locard, 1898)
- Cancer edwardsi (Bell, 1835)
- Chirostylus milneedwardsi (Henderson, 1885)
- Ciona edwardsi (Roule, 1886)
- Colobomatus edwardsi (Richiardi, 1876)
- Colpaster edwardsi (Perrier, 1882)
- Conus milneedwardsi (F. P. Jousseaume, 1894)
- Costa edwardsii (Roemer, 1838)
- Diastylis edwardsi (Krøyer, 1841)
- Diogenes edwardsii (de Haan, 1849)
- Discodoris edwardsi (Vayssière, 1902)
- Dynamene edwardsi (Lucas, 1849)
- Ebalia edwardsii (Costa, 1838)
- Fedora edwardsi (Jullien, 1882)
- Forskalia edwardsi (Kölliker, 1853)
- Glossocephalus milneedwardsi (Bovallius, 1887)
- Goniastrea edwardsi (Chevalier, 1971)
- Grapsicepon edwardsi Giard & Bonnier, 1888
- Jasus edwardsii (Hutton, 1875)
- Lithophyllon edwardsi (Rosseau, 1850)
- Lophoura edwardsi (Kölliker, 1853)
- Maasella edwardsi (de Lacaze-Duthiers, 1888)
- Montipora edwardsi (Bernard, 1879)
- Myrianida edwardsi (de Saint-Joseph, 1887)
- Neoamphitrite edwardsii (de Quatrefages, 1865)
- Ocenebra edwardsii (Payraudeau, 1826)
- Odontozona edwardsi (Bouvier, 1908)
- Onisimus edwardsii (Krøyer, 1846)
- Pagurus edwardsi (Dana, 1852)
- Periclimenes edwardsi (Paulson, 1875)
- Pisoides edwardsi (Bell, 1835)
- Plesionika edwardsii (Brandt, 1851)
- Propithecus edwardsi (Grandidier, 1871)
- Sadayoshia edwardsii (Miers, 1884)
- Salmincola edwardsi (Olsson, 1869)
- Sergestes edwardsii (Krøyer, 1855)
- Tergipes edwardsii (Nordmann, 1844)
- Teuchopora edwardsi (Jullien, 1882)

== Bibliography ==
- Marcelin Berthelot, Notice historique sur Henri Milne Edwards, Didot, Paris 1891.
- Trevor Norton: Stars beneath the sea, Carroll & Graf, New York 2000. ISBN 0-7867-0750-X
