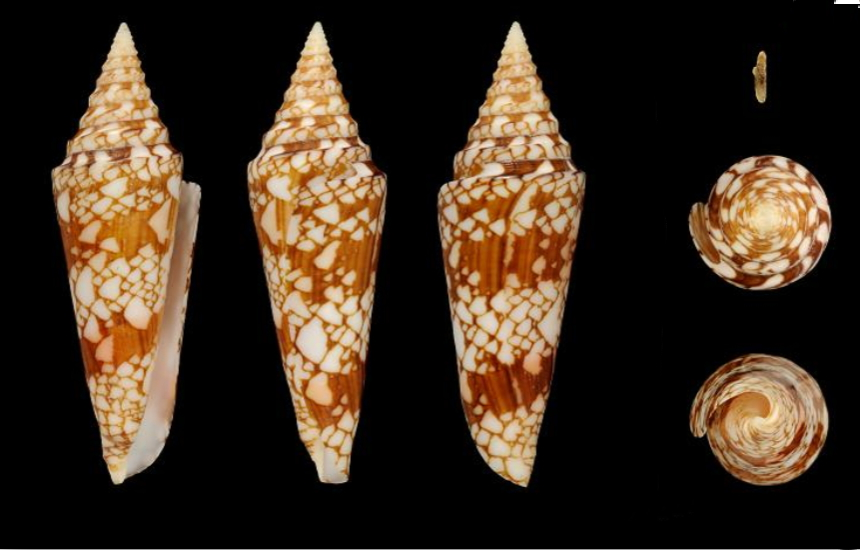
- Shell and protoconch of Conus milneedwardsii (specimen at the Smithsonian Institution)

Conservation status
- Least Concern (IUCN 3.1)

Scientific classification
- Kingdom: Animalia
- Phylum: Mollusca
- Class: Gastropoda
- Subclass: Caenogastropoda
- Order: Neogastropoda
- Superfamily: Conoidea
- Family: Conidae
- Genus: Conus
- Species: C. milneedwardsi

Binomial name
- Conus milneedwardsi Jousseaume, 1894

Synonyms
- Conus (Leptoconus) milneedwardsi Jousseaume, 1894 · accepted, alternate representation; Leptoconus milneedwardsi (Jousseaume, 1894)

= Conus milneedwardsi =

Species of sea snail

Conus milneedwardsi, known to collectors as the "Glory of India", is a species of sea snail, a marine gastropod mollusk in the family Conidae, the cone snails and their allies.

Like all species within the genus Conus, these snails are predatory and venomous. They are capable of stinging humans, therefore live ones should be handled carefully or not at all.

Subspecies

- Conus milneedwardsi clytospira Melvill & Standen, 1899
- Conus milneedwardsi eduardi Delsaerdt, 1997
- Conus milneedwardsi lemuriensis Wils & Delsaerdt, 1989
- Conus milneedwardsi milneedwardsi Jousseaume, 1894: common name: the Glory of India cone

== Description ==
The size of an adult shell varies between 46 mm and 193 mm. This species has a rather thin and slender shell with a smooth surface, an acuminate Spire and an angulate shoulder. The color of the shell is white with two chocolate spiral bands on the body whorl. This body whorl shows a pattern of axial reddish brown reticulated lines forming white triangles or quadrangular markings.

== Distribution ==
This marine species occurs off Madagascar and off the African coast from KwaZulu-Natal, South Africa, to the Red Sea; in the China Sea; in the Indian Ocean off Bombay.

The subspecies C. m. clytospira Melvill & Standen, 1899 occurs from Pakistan to India and Sri Lanka, C. m. lemuriensis Wils & Delsaerdt, 1989 in the Indian Ocean along Réunion and Mauritius.
