= Archaeoscinidae =

Scientific classification
- Kingdom: Animalia
- Phylum: Arthropoda
- Clade: Pancrustacea
- Class: Malacostraca
- Order: Amphipoda
- Superfamily: Scinoidea
- Family: Archaeoscinidae

Family of crustaceans

Archaeoscinidae is a family of crustaceans belonging to the order Amphipoda.

== Genera ==
- Archaeoscina Stebbing, 1904
- Paralanceola Barnard, 1930
