= Phronimidae =

Scientific classification
- Kingdom: Animalia
- Phylum: Arthropoda
- Clade: Pancrustacea
- Class: Malacostraca
- Order: Amphipoda
- Superfamily: Phronimoidea
- Family: Phronimidae; Rafinesque, 1815

Family of crustaceans

The Phronimidae are a family of amphipod crustaceans, containing two genera:

- Phronima Latreille, 1802
- Phronimella Claus, 1862
