= Megabalanus stultus =

Scientific classification
- Domain: Eukaryota
- Kingdom: Animalia
- Phylum: Arthropoda
- Class: Thecostraca
- Subclass: Cirripedia
- Order: Balanomorpha
- Family: Balanidae
- Genus: Megabalanus
- Species: M. stultus

Binomial name
- Megabalanus stultus (Darwin, 1854)

Synonyms
- Balanus stultus Darwin, 1854

Species of barnacle

Megabalanus stultus is a species of barnacle first described by Charles Darwin in 1854. It lives on fire corals of the genus Millepora in the Atlantic Ocean from Florida to southern Brazil.

== Ecology ==
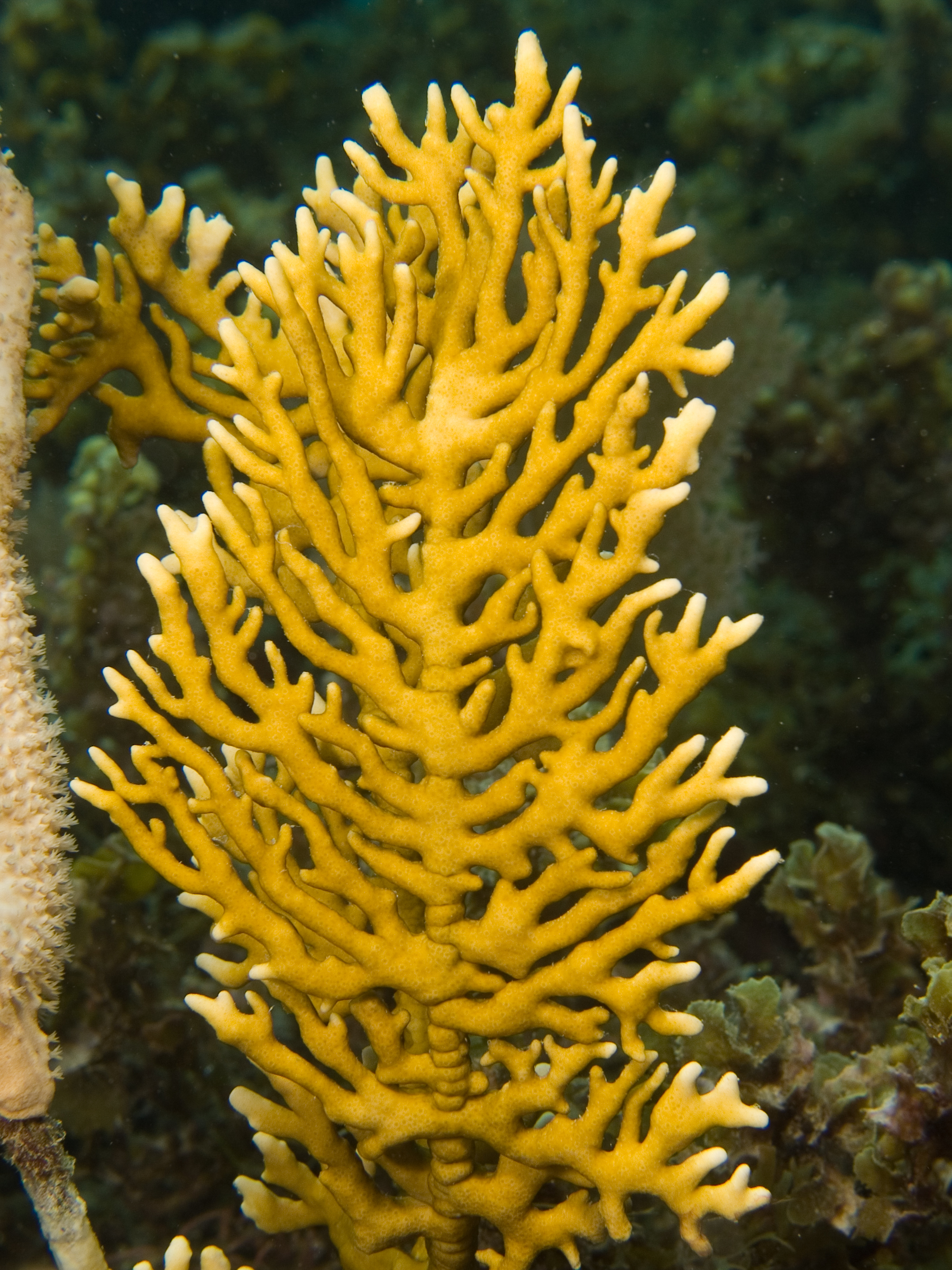
Millepora alcicornis, one of the species of fire coral inhabited by Me. stultus

Megabalanus stultus is one of three species of barnacle that live on fire corals (the genus Millepora). Savignium milleporae lives in the Indo-Pacific and lives on 9 species of Millepora; Megabalanus ajax lives in the western Pacific and lives on Millepora platyphylla; Me. stultus lives in the western Atlantic, and lives on Mi. alcicornis and Mi. complanata. The nature of the relationship between M. stultus and the coral is unclear. At low densities, the barnacle has no discernible effect on the coral, but high-densities of coral-inhabiting barnacles can disrupt the growth of the colony.

== Distribution ==
In his original description of the species, Darwin reported that M. stultus occurred in Singapore and the West Indies. In 1968, Arnold Ross considered the reports of M stultus from the Pacific Ocean to be erroneous, limiting the type locality to the West Indies. M. stultus has subsequently been reported from Taiwan in the western Pacific, and those records have been reassessed as referring to the related species Megabalanus ajax.

M. stultus is now thought to occur exclusively in the western Atlantic, including the Caribbean Sea, from Florida to Rio de Janeiro, Brazil.

== Description ==
Megabalnus stultus differs from the other species of Megabalanus in that the basal margin is sinuous, rather than straight, and protrudes medially, whereas in other species it protrudes little if at all. The shell is "dirty white" in colour, often with a purple tinge, and pale blue in parts.

== Taxonomic history ==
Megabalanus stultus was first described by Charles Darwin in 1854, under the name Balanus stultus. It was placed in the subgenus Megabalanus by Ross in 1968, which was raised to the rank of genus in 1976.
