= Blade fire coral =

Blade fire coral is a common name used for two different species of fire coral. It may refer to:

- Millepora complanata, found in the Caribbean Sea
- Millepora platyphylla, found in the Indo-Pacific
