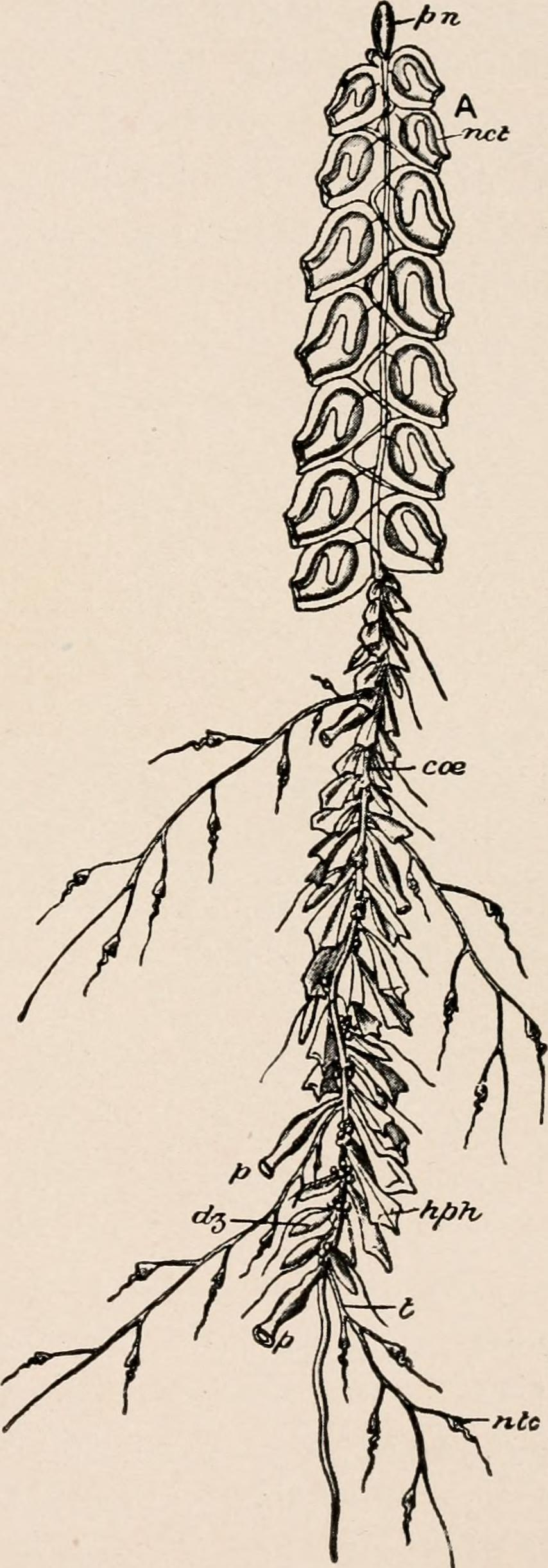

Scientific classification
- Kingdom: Animalia
- Phylum: Cnidaria
- Class: Hydrozoa
- Order: Siphonophorae
- Family: Agalmatidae
- Genus: Nanomia
- Species: N. bijuga

Binomial name
- Nanomia bijuga Delle Chiaje, 1844

= Nanomia bijuga =

Species of hydrozoan

Nanomia bijuga is a species of siphonophores in the family Agalmatidae, a colonial organism like other siphonophores, which possess specialized zooids such as the jet-propulsive nectophores. They can be found in coastal and open-ocean environments in the North Atlantic and Pacific Oceans, occupying the epipelagic and the mesopelagic zones of the ocean. N. bijuga participates in the Diel Vertical Migration, moving up to the epipelagic zone to feed on plankton at night and then back down to the mesopelagic zone during the day.

== Taxonomy ==
Nanomia bijuga was first scientifically documented by the French zoologist Félix Dujardin in 1843. Its initial description marked a significant milestone in the understanding of these colonial marine organisms, shedding light on their complex biology and ecological roles within oceanic ecosystems. N. bijuga was described by Italian zoologist Stefano Delle Chiaje in 1844, as Physophora bijuga.

== Anatomy and morphology ==
Nanomia bijuga, like other siphonophores, is made up of genetically identical but highly specialized zooids, arranged in an elongate colony structure. The zooids' functions encompass prey capture, propulsion, and reproduction, all orchestrated within a translucent or transparent body, aiding in camouflage amidst its oceanic habitat. The organism is composed of two main body segments: the nectosome on the anterior end and the siphosome as the posterior. The nectosome contains a gas-filled pneumatophore at its end as well as nectophores, bell-shaped structures that assist in locomotion. The siphosome contains zooids specialized for feeding, digestion, reproduction, and protection. These zooids are organized in repeating sequences called cormidia. Each cormidium contains one feeding zooid, the gastrozooid, with multiples of the other zooid types. Gonophores and gonodendrons, the male and female reproductive zooids respectively, occur together in pairs.

Each gastrozooid has its own tentillum, which is used to capture and subdue prey. These tentilla house nematocysts, stinging cells that deliver toxins into the prey organism. There are four different types of nematocysts found within the tentilla. Heteronemes, the largest of the nematocysts, possess a wider stinging apparatus than the other types and are primarily found at the proximal end of the tentilla. Haplonemes, the most abundant type, are smaller than heteronemes and structured similarly with open tips for stinging but no distinct spiny shaft. The final two types are desmonemes and rhopalonemes which are both used for adhesion to prey in order to prevent it from escaping as the stinging cells perform their function.

A matured pneumatophore of N. bijuga contains five different tissues, two layers of ectoderm, two layers of endoderm, and a layer of ectodermal cells that are not connected to any basement membrane. One set of ectoderm/endoderm layers exists on the outside of the pneumatophore while the other set exists inside the external layer and acts as the gas chamber.

== Distribution and habitat ==
Nanomia bijuga is widely distributed across all major oceans of the world except the Antarctic Ocean. A few of its sighted locations are the Monterey Bay, the Gulf of Mexico, the Sagami Bay of Japan the Hansa Bay of Papua New Guinea, and the Bantry Bay of Ireland.

== Biology ==
Nanomia bijuga is an epi/meso-pelagic species that can vertically migrate up to 1000 m in depth, though it predominantly thrives at depths of 200-400m. Their ability for long range vertical migration makes them key contributors to the deep scattering layer. These organisms are frequently found in warm or temperate waters on the Western Coast of North America where their abundance was measured to be 47 per 1000 m^{3}.

Their abundance is significantly correlated with seasonality and primary production. Notably, sightings coincide at spring phytoplankton blooms in the Sagami Bay. Similarly, collection rates of Nanomia bijuga in the Bantry Bay of Ireland heightened in the months of May–September, with peak density in May/June, which correlated with the annual phytoplankton blooms in the region.
