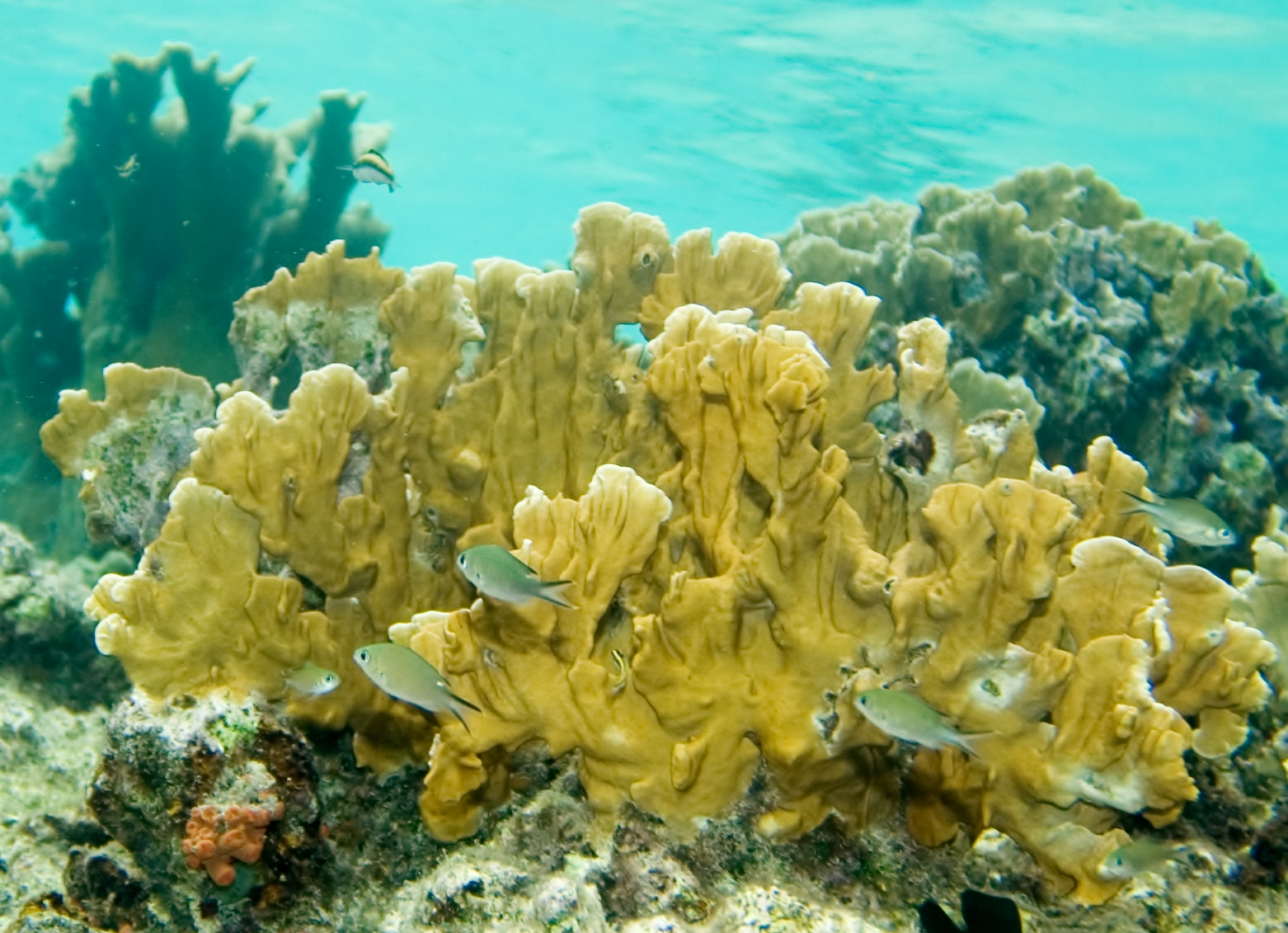

Conservation status
- Critically Endangered (IUCN 3.1)
- CITES Appendix II

Scientific classification
- Kingdom: Animalia
- Phylum: Cnidaria
- Class: Hydrozoa
- Order: Anthoathecata
- Family: Milleporidae
- Genus: Millepora
- Species: M. complanata

Binomial name
- Millepora complanata Lamarck, 1816

Synonyms
- Millepora alcicornis plicata Esper, 1790; Millepora sancta Duchassaing & Michelotti, 1864

= Millepora complanata =

Species of hydrozoan

Millepora complanata, commonly known as blade fire coral, is a species of fire coral in the family Milleporidae. It is found in shallow waters in the Caribbean Sea where it is a common species. The International Union for Conservation of Nature has assessed its conservation status as being critically endangered.

== Description ==
Fire corals are colonial coral-like organisms that secrete calcareous skeletons. Colonies of Millepora complanata have an encrusting base and thin upright plates or blades growing to a height of about 50 centimetres (20 in). The plates of Millepora complanata grow perpendicular to the current direction, with some colonies not growing larger than the encrusted base if the current is too strong. The surface of the blades is smooth and the outer margins irregular, with many stumpy protrusions. This fire coral is pale brown or cream coloured, with white tips to the blades. The feeding and defensive polyps are hair-like and project through fine pores on the surface of the blades. Contact with this fire coral by bare skin can cause a severe stinging sensation.

== Distribution and habitat ==
Millepora complanata has a widespread distribution in the Caribbean Sea. It often grows in areas with vigorous water movement and turbid waters, and is tolerant of siltation.

== Biology ==
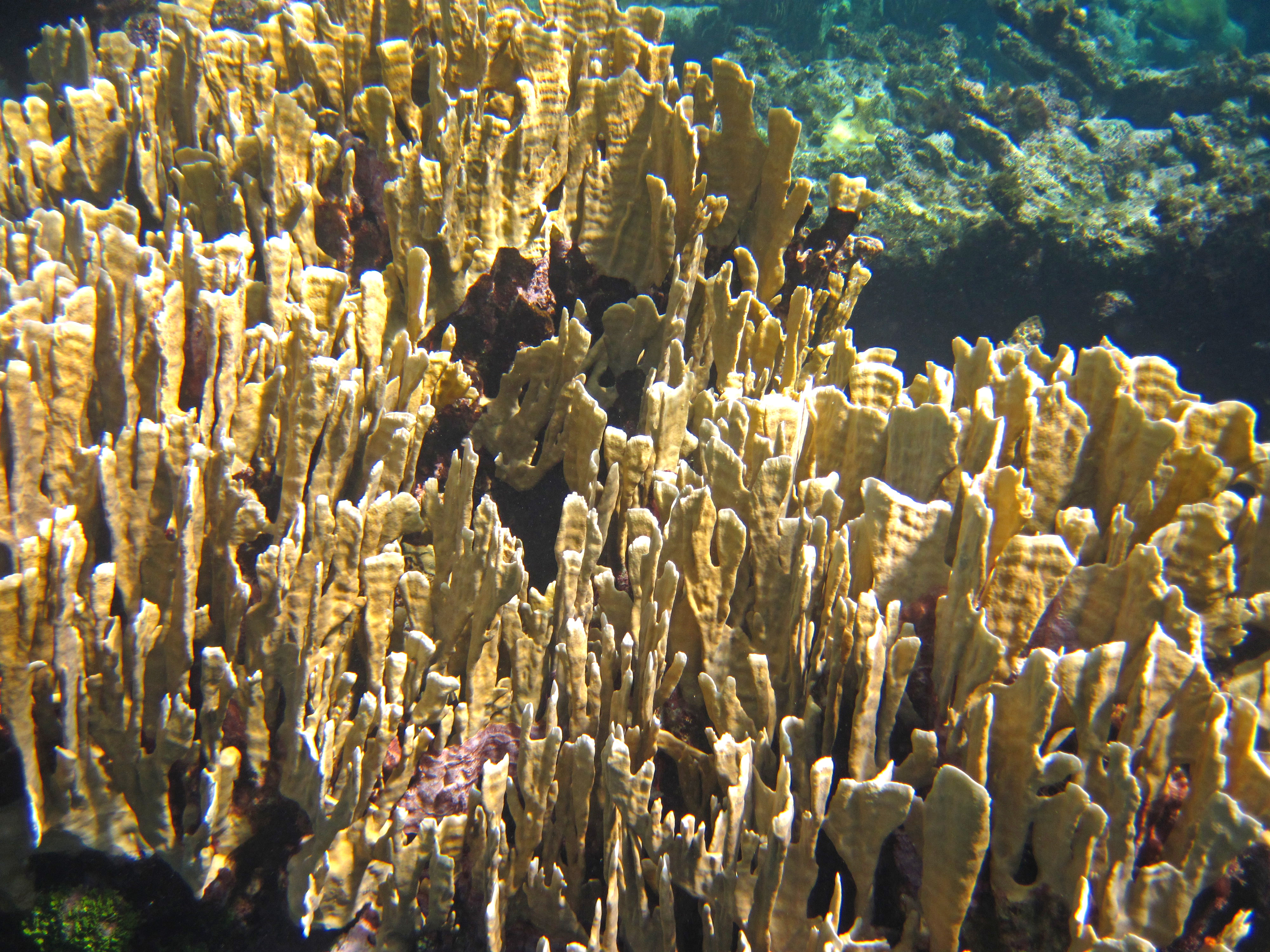
Growing at San Salvador Island, Bahamas

Some of the polyps of Millepora complanata are dactylozooids with hair-like processes and stinging cells that detect the presence of zooplankton and help entrap it. The nematocyst in the dactylozooid is discharged and injects venom into the prey, all within three milliseconds. Other polyps are gastrozooids and their chief function is the ingestion of food for the colony. Copepods form the main part of the diet. The soft tissues of M. complanata contain zooxanthellae, symbiotic photosynthetic dinoflagellates. These provide much of the organic carbon needed by the fire coral. The M. complanata can feed during both day and night, but tend to feed mostly at night.

The reproduction of fire corals is complex and involves an alternation of asexual and sexual generations. The encrusting parts of the coral expand by the growth of stolons, and the edges of blades expand by sympodial growth. Sexual reproduction involves a sessile polyploid stage and the budding off of planktonic medusae. Broken off fragments of coral blades can successfully reattach to the substrate and M. complanata is one of the first coral species to recolonise damaged reefs.

Millepora complanata is susceptible to coral bleaching, a process by which stressed corals expel their zooxanthellae and turn white. In a mass bleaching event in the Caribbean in 1998 caused by thermal stress, both M. complanata and the closely related Millepora alcicornis were affected but M. alcicornis more severely so. Many colonies were killed but some, especially colonies of M. complanata, recovered and regained their colour over the course of a few months.
