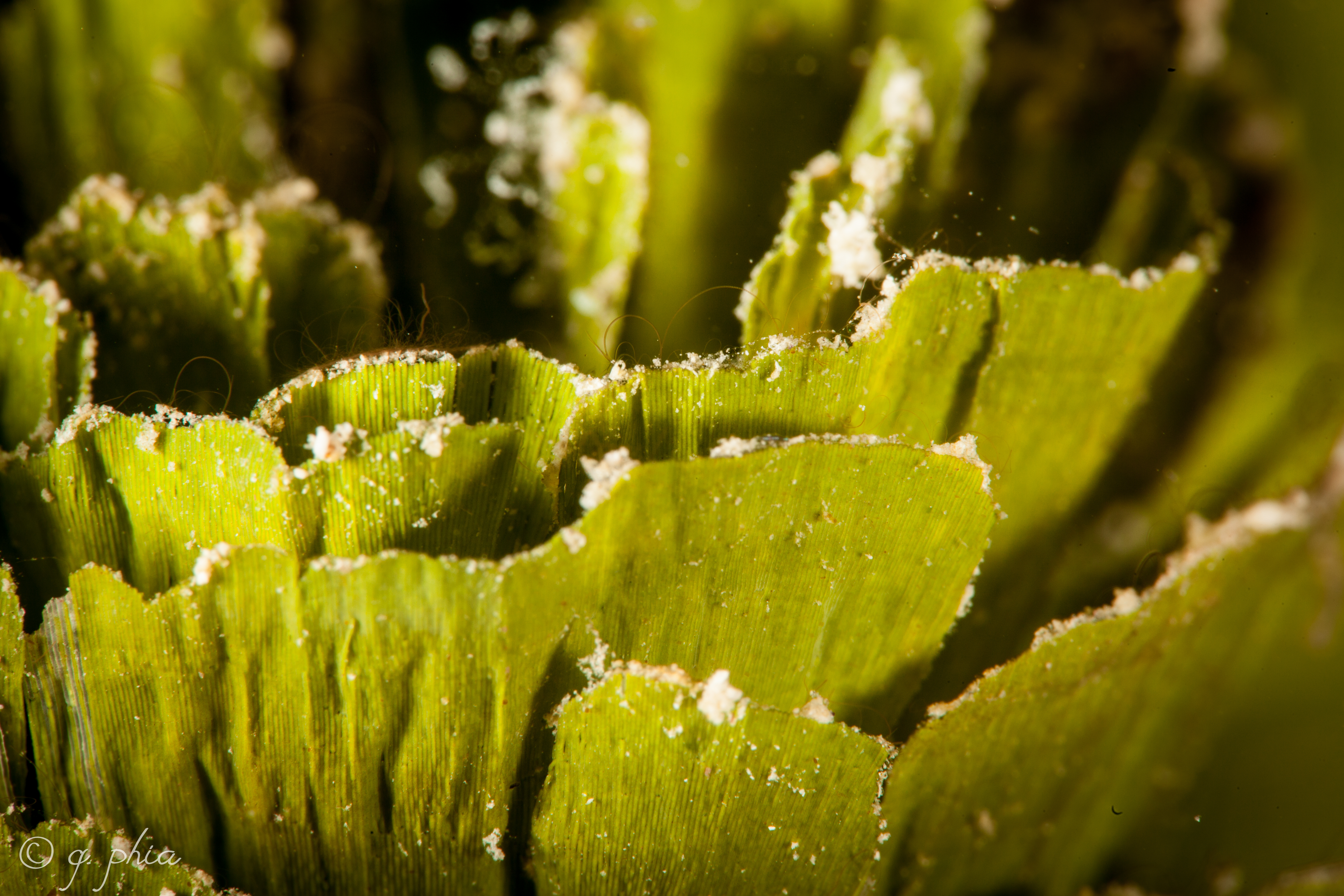

Conservation status
- Critically Endangered (IUCN 3.1)
- CITES Appendix II (CITES)

Scientific classification
- Kingdom: Animalia
- Phylum: Cnidaria
- Class: Hydrozoa
- Order: Anthoathecata
- Family: Milleporidae
- Genus: Millepora
- Species: M. squarrosa

Binomial name
- Millepora squarrosa Lamarck, 1816

Synonyms
- Millepora faveolata Duchassaing & Michelotti, 1864; Millepora folliata Milne Edwards, 1860; Millepora tuberculata Duchassaing, 1850

= Millepora squarrosa =

Species of hydrozoan

Millepora squarrosa is a species of fire coral that can be found in the Caribbean Sea as well as in the western Atlantic. They are very common on fringing reefs in patches. They have a smooth surface covered in tiny pores from which polyps protrude. They can reach up to 5 centimeters in height and can range from brown or tan in color with slight purple or red tints. It is commonly known as "box fire coral", which refers to its box-like structure and the stinging sensation felt when touched with a bare hand. These corals are important to reef-building.

== Description ==
The irregular patches of this coral appear different depending on age. Younger patches are made up of corals with rounded edges, while older patches tend to have sharper edges, the resulting shape can be known as 'box-like' or 'honeycombed'. With age, the corals can appear square, and connected masses create a cube shape. M. squarrosa differ from other corals in the genus due to the high number of dactylozooids on the surface, the dactylopores they reside in are also smaller when compared to other corals in this genus. These corals produce calcium carbonate skeletons.

== Habitat ==
Millepora squarrosa prefer shallow water and hard substrate, and tend to be more common where there is heavy surf. These corals are found up to 20m of water and are located in various parts of reefs, including the "reef crest, reef flat, and reef front". They are located in the intertidal zone.

== Distribution ==
Outside of the Caribbean Sea this species can be found as far south as Brazil in the Western Atlantic. There is discussion about what separates species of the Millepora genus, however the most recent literature references M.squarrosa in the Caribbean Sea and in Brazil, although less frequently. The patches of these corals are not continuous.

== Adaptations ==
The heavier surf that these corals are found in may have resulted in the coral being more sturdy, through compact and wide bases. The name fire coral comes from the stinging sensation that occurs when they are touched. This is due to nematocysts.

== Diet ==
Corals are suspension feeders that filter water, and consume plankton. Millepora corals feed by "feeding polyps" (gastrozoids) and "defensive polyps" (dactylozoids), which capture plankton as it is carried by the current. In order to get the necessary nutrients for calcium carbonate skeleton production Millepora corals have a symbiotic relationship with Symbiodiniaceae, and the specific algae depends on location.

== Reproduction ==
These corals undergo asexual and sexual reproduction. Along with this, the reproduction occurs once colonies become mature in the spring or summer. The specific date is unknown, however each species spawns at a different period which prevents genetic material interacting with other fire coral species.

=== Sexual ===
There are male and female colonies and both release their respective genetic material into the water column. This is where fertilization occurs. First, an ampullae is made on the surface of the coral, this is where the genetic material is made. The release of the contents (referred to as spawning) occurs before dark, and the material will be fertilized or dead within 12 hours of spawning. Depending on conditions the fertilized material (larvae) can live in the water column up to a month. Once that larva has attached to a substrate it will begin asexual reproduction.

=== Asexual ===
Millepora produce a large amount of offspring and can reproduce through fragmentation. The main use of asexual reproduction is once larvae has attached to a substrate asexual reproduction, budding in this case, will be used.

== Life Stages ==
Fertilization occurs in the water column, followed by settlement, metamorphosis, and the formation of coral. The larvae stage, in between the fertilizations and water column, and the formation of coral is outlined below.

Larvae: The larvae can attach to any hard substrate, i.e.. naturally occurring or manmade. Prior to attachment the larvae are pelagic.

Coral formation: As the corals age they create complex structures that serve as habitats for other organisms. Due to pieces of the coral breaking off, as many are located in high surf areas, new colonies can form throughout the reef through clonal propagation.

== Movement ==
As with all corals, M. squarrosa are sessile after the larvae has attached to substrate.

== Threats ==
When coral bleaching occurs the genus Millepora is often the first effected. The bleaching events have caused local extinction of Millepora species. Ocean acidification is causing harm to corals in the Millepora genus due to a reduction in the calcium carbonate that can be used by the corals. Along with this, many predators are deterred due to the stinging cells on M. squarrosa.

=== Conservation ===
They are categorized as endangered.
