= Rudjakovia =

Scientific classification
- Domain: Eukaryota
- Kingdom: Animalia
- Phylum: Cnidaria
- Class: Hydrozoa
- Order: Siphonophorae
- Family: Agalmatidae
- Genus: Rudjakovia; Margulis, 1982
- Species: R. plicata

Binomial name
- Rudjakovia plicata Margulis, 1982

Synonyms
- Genus synonymy: Stepanyantsia Margulis, 1982; Species synonymy: Stepanyantsia polymorpha Margulis, 1982

Genus of marine invertebrates

Rudjakovia is a monotypic genus of cnidarians belonging to the family Agalmatidae. The only species is Rudjakovia plicata.

The species was described by R. Y. Margulis in 1982.

The species inhabits marine environment.
