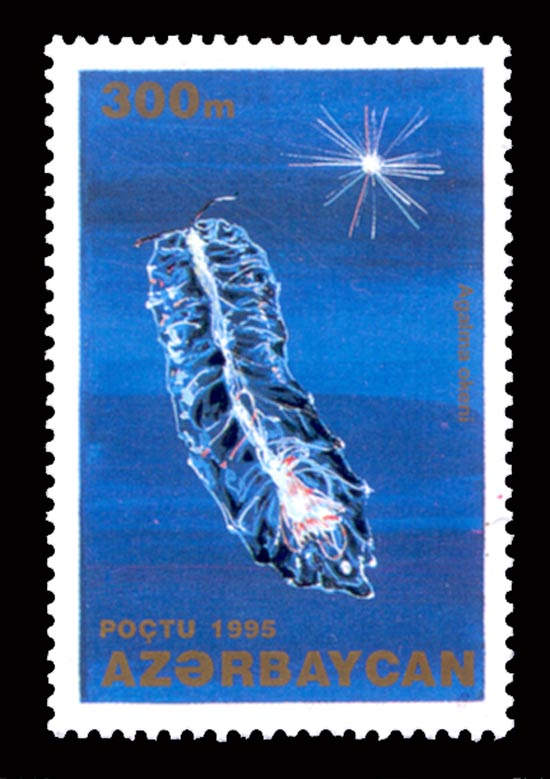

Scientific classification
- Kingdom: Animalia
- Phylum: Cnidaria
- Class: Hydrozoa
- Order: Siphonophorae
- Family: Agalmatidae
- Genus: Agalma
- Species: A. okenii

Binomial name
- Agalma okenii Eschscholtz, 1825

Synonyms
- Agalma okeni Eschscholtz, 1825; Agalma rigidum (Haeckel, 1869); Crystallodes rigidum Haeckel, 1869; Crystallodes vitrea Haeckel, 1888a; Crystallomia polygonata Dana, 1858; Crystallomia rigidum (Haeckel, 1869)

= Agalma okenii =

Species of hydrozoan

Agalma okenii is a species of siphonophore in the family Agalmatidae. It was first described by Johann Friedrich von Eschscholtz , who collected it on his second voyage. It was described again by James Dwight Dana in 1859, who named it Crystallomia polygonata.
