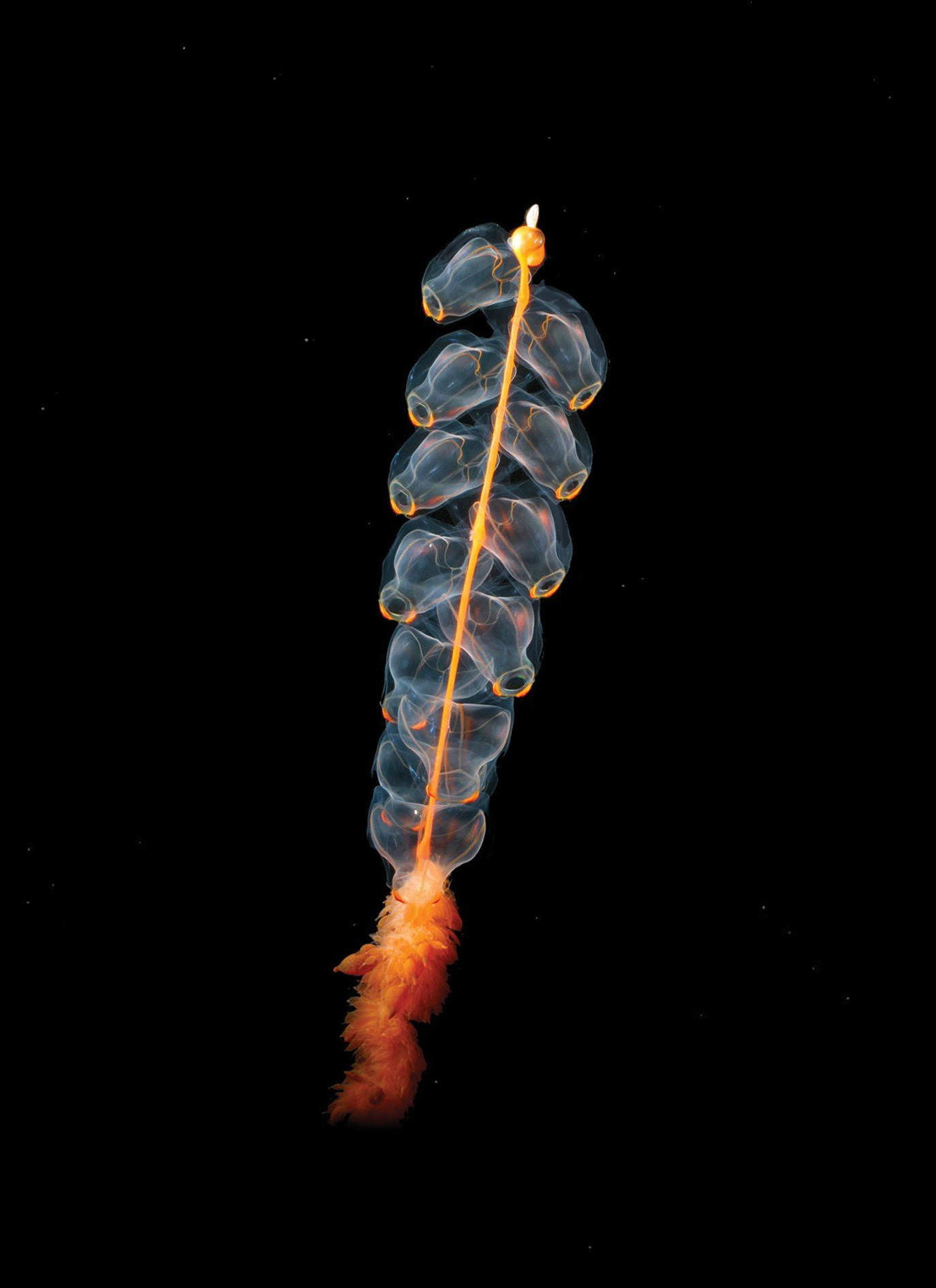
- Marrus orthocanna

Scientific classification
- Kingdom: Animalia
- Phylum: Cnidaria
- Class: Hydrozoa
- Order: Siphonophorae
- Suborder: Physonectae
- Family: Agalmatidae; Brandt, 1834

= Agalmatidae =

Family of hydrozoans

Agalmatidae, or Agalmidae, is a family of siphonophores.

== Systematic list ==
- Genus Agalma Eschscholtz, 1825
  - Agalma clausi Bedot, 1888
  - Agalma elegans (Sars, 1846)
  - Agalma okenii Eschscholtz, 1825
- Genus Athorybia Eschscholtz, 1829
  - Athorybia lucida Biggs, 1978
  - Athorybia rosacea (Forskål, 1775)
- Genus Frillagalma Daniel, 1966
  - Frillagalma vityazi Daniel, 1966
- Genus Halistemma Huxley, 1859
  - Halistemma cupulifera Lens & van Riemsdijk, 1908
  - Halistemma foliacea (Quoy & Gaimard, 1833)
  - Halistemma maculatum Pugh & Baxter, 2014
  - Halistemma rubrum (Vogt, 1852)
  - Halistemma striata Totton, 1965
  - Halistemma transliratum Pugh & Youngbluth, 1988
- Genus Lychnagalma Haeckel, 1888
  - Lychnagalma utricularia (Claus, 1879)
- Genus Marrus Totton, 1954
  - Marrus antarcticus Totton, 1954
  - Marrus claudanielis Dunn, Pugh & Haddock, 2005
  - Marrus orthocanna (Kramp, 1942)
  - Marrus orthocannoides Totton, 1954
- Genus Melophysa Haeckel, 1888
  - Melophysa melo (Quoy & Gaimard, 1827)
- Genus Nanomia A. Agassiz, 1865
  - Nanomia bijuga (Delle Chiaje, 1844)
  - Nanomia cara Agassiz, 1865
- Genus Rudjakovia Margulis, 1982
  - Rudjakovia plicata Margulis, 1982

=== Former genera ===
- Agalmopsis Sars, 1846 accepted as Agalma Eschscholtz, 1825
- Lynchagalma accepted as Lychnagalma Haeckel, 1888
- Moseria Totton, 1965 accepted as Resomia Pugh, 2006

=== Nomen dubium ===
The following names of uncertain status have been placed in the family.

- Paragalma Margulis, 1976
- Stepanyantsia
