= Millepora striata =

Conservation status
- Vulnerable (IUCN 3.1)
- CITES Appendix II (CITES)

Scientific classification
- Kingdom: Animalia
- Phylum: Cnidaria
- Class: Hydrozoa
- Order: Anthoathecata
- Family: Milleporidae
- Genus: Millepora
- Species: M. striata

Binomial name
- Millepora striata Duchassaing & Michelotti, 1864

Species of hydrozoan

Millepora striata is a species of fire coral currently found in Belize, Colombia, Honduras, Panama, Venezuela, and Bolivia, but also found in fossil deposits in Guadeloupe and Cuba.
