= Athorybia =

Scientific classification
- Kingdom: Animalia
- Phylum: Cnidaria
- Class: Hydrozoa
- Order: Siphonophorae
- Family: Agalmatidae
- Genus: Athorybia; Eschscholtz, 1829

Synonyms
- Angela Lesson, 1843 (Preocc.); Anthophysa Brandt, 1835; Ploeophysa Fewkes, 1888

Genus of cnidarians

Athorybia is a genus of cnidarians belonging to the family Agalmatidae.

The species of this genus are found in tropical regions.

== Species ==
- Athorybia lucida Biggs, 1978
- Athorybia rosacea (Forsskål, 1775)
