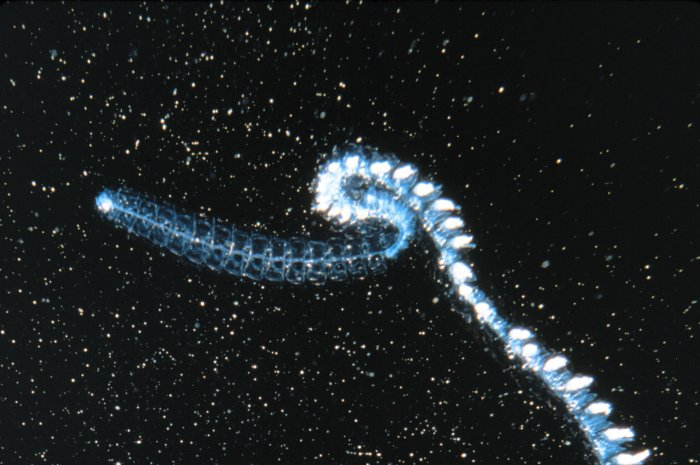
- Nanomia cara

Scientific classification
- Kingdom: Animalia
- Phylum: Cnidaria
- Class: Hydrozoa
- Order: Siphonophorae
- Family: Agalmatidae
- Genus: Nanomia

Synonyms
- Anthemodes Haeckel, 1869; Cupulita Quoy & Gaimard, 1824; Nanomya Agassiz, 1883

= Nanomia =

Genus of hydrozoans

Nanomia is a genus of cnidarians belonging to the family Agalmatidae.

The genus has almost cosmopolitan distribution.

Species:

- Nanomia bijuga (Delle Chiaje, 1844)
- Nanomia cara Agassiz, 1865
