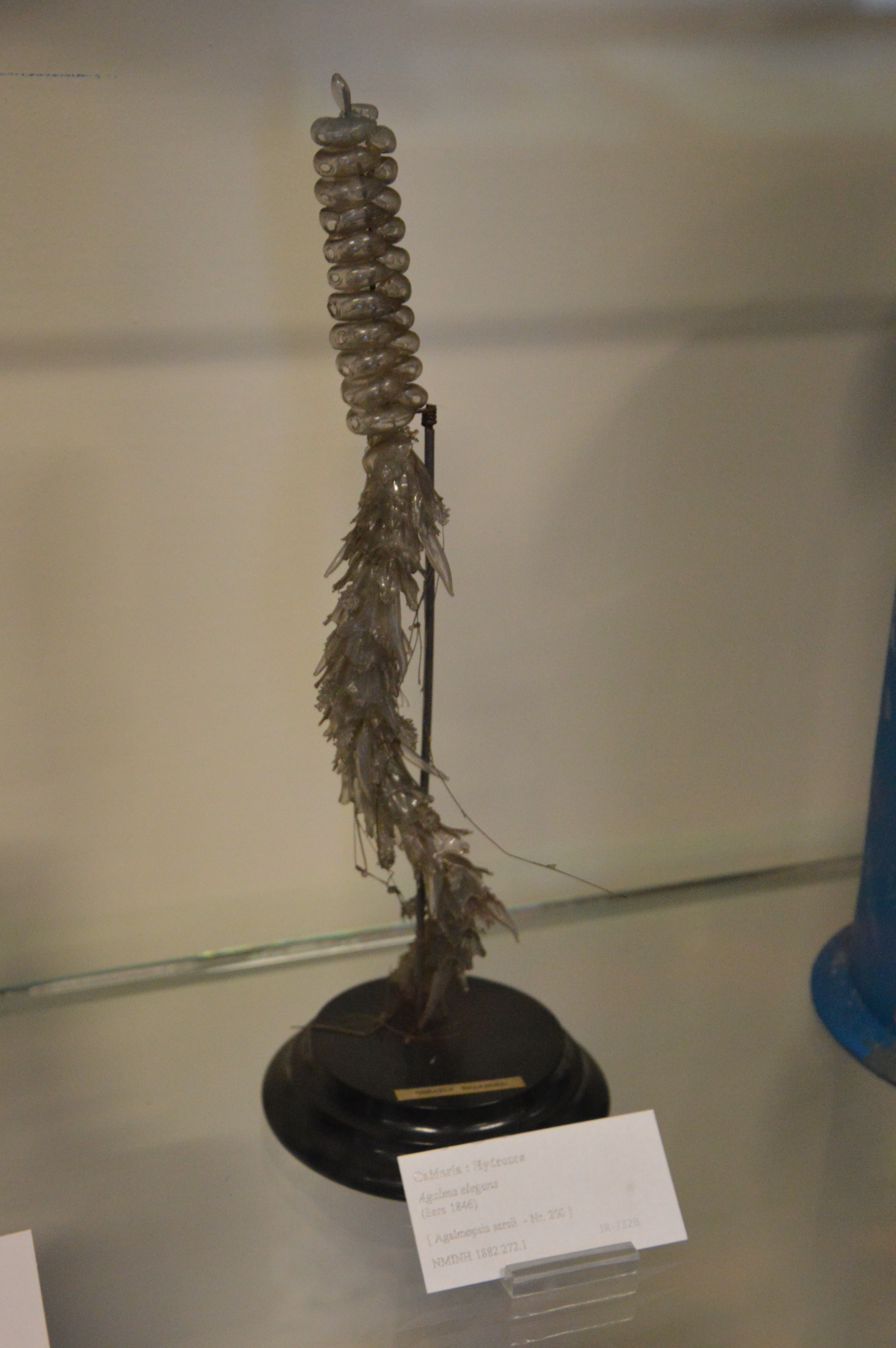
- Agalma elegans at the Natural History Museum (National Museum of Ireland) in Dublin.

Scientific classification
- Kingdom: Animalia
- Phylum: Cnidaria
- Class: Hydrozoa
- Order: Siphonophorae
- Family: Agalmatidae
- Genus: Agalma; Eschscholtz, 1825

Synonyms
- Agalmoides Fewkes, 1891; Agalmopsis Sars, 1846; Crystallodes Haeckel, 1869; Crystallomia Dana, 1858; Cuneolaria Chamisso & Eysenhardt, 1821

= Agalma (cnidarian) =

Genus of hydrozoans

Agalma is a genus of siphonophores in the family Agalmatidae. Siphonophores are colonial hydrozoans that feed on zooplankton.

== Species ==
- Agalma clausi Bedot, 1888
- Agalma elegans (Sars, 1846)
- Agalma okenii Eschscholtz, 1825

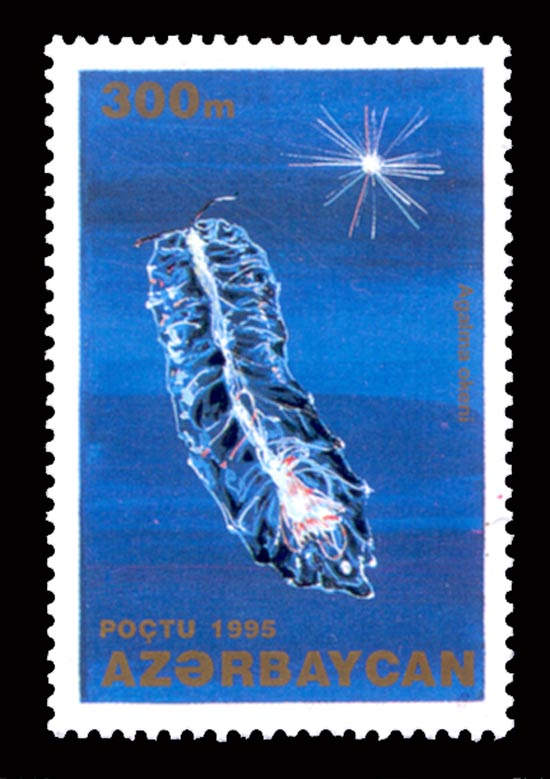
Agalma okenii on a 1995 stamp from Azerbaijan
