= Athorybia rosacea =

Scientific classification
- Kingdom: Animalia
- Phylum: Cnidaria
- Class: Hydrozoa
- Order: Siphonophorae
- Family: Agalmatidae
- Genus: Athorybia
- Species: A. rosacea

Binomial name
- Athorybia rosacea Forsskål, 1775

Synonyms
- Angela cytherea Lesson, 1843; Anthophysa formosa (Fewkes, 1882); Anthophysa rosea Brandt, 1835; Athorybia formosa Fewkes, 1882; Athorybia longifolia Kawamura, 1954; Diphyes formosa (Fewkes, 1882); Physsophora rosacea Forsskål, 1775; Ploeophysa Agassizii Fewkes, 1888; Rhizophysa heliantha Quoy & Gaimard, 1827

Species of hydrozoan

Athorybia rosacea is a species of siphonophores in the family Agalmatidae. It was first described by Peter Forsskål in 1775.
