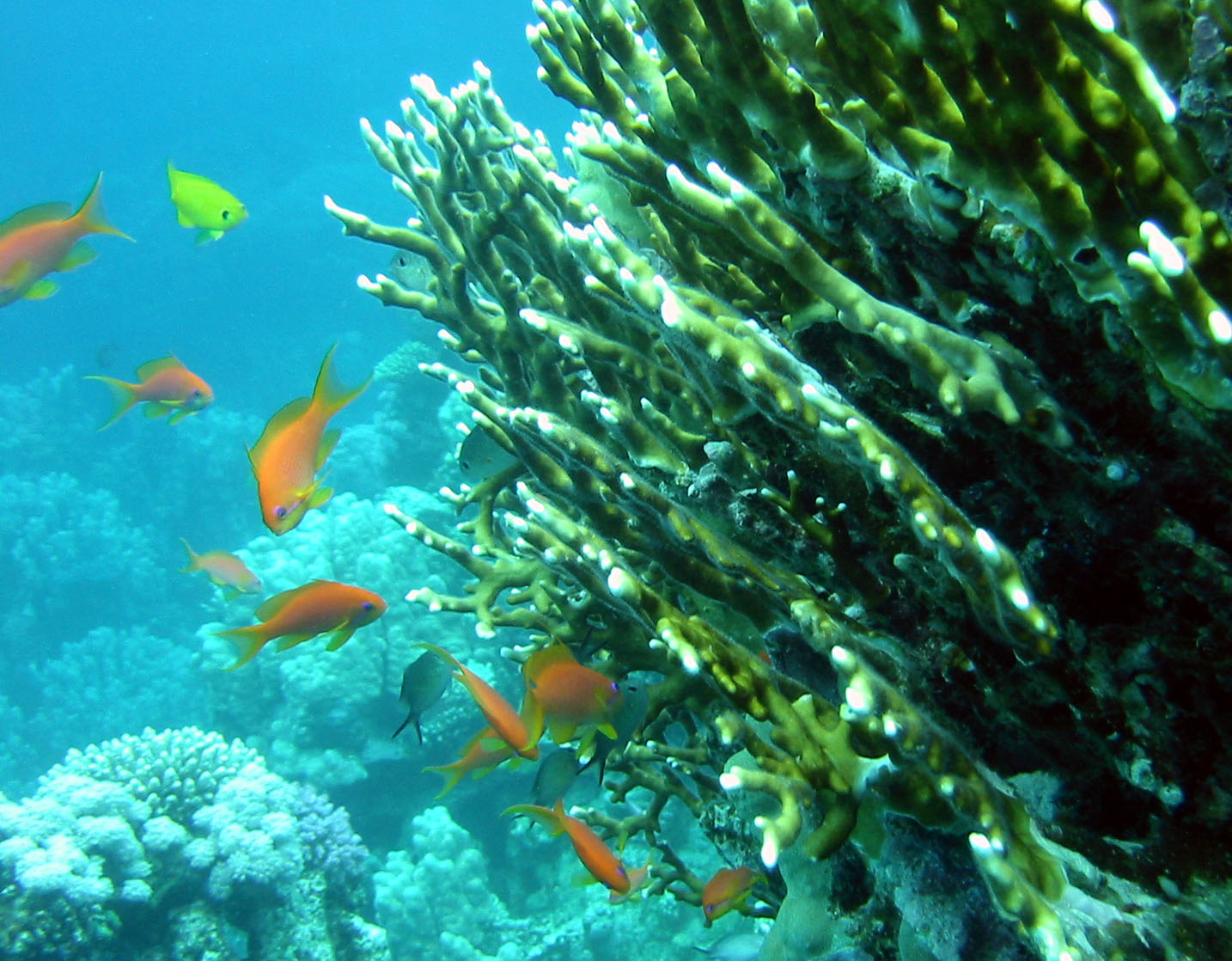
- Millepora dichotoma

Scientific classification
- Kingdom: Animalia
- Phylum: Cnidaria
- Class: Hydrozoa
- Order: Anthoathecata
- Suborder: Capitata
- Family: Milleporidae; Fleming, 1828
- Genus: Millepora; Linnaeus, 1758

Diversity
- 15 species
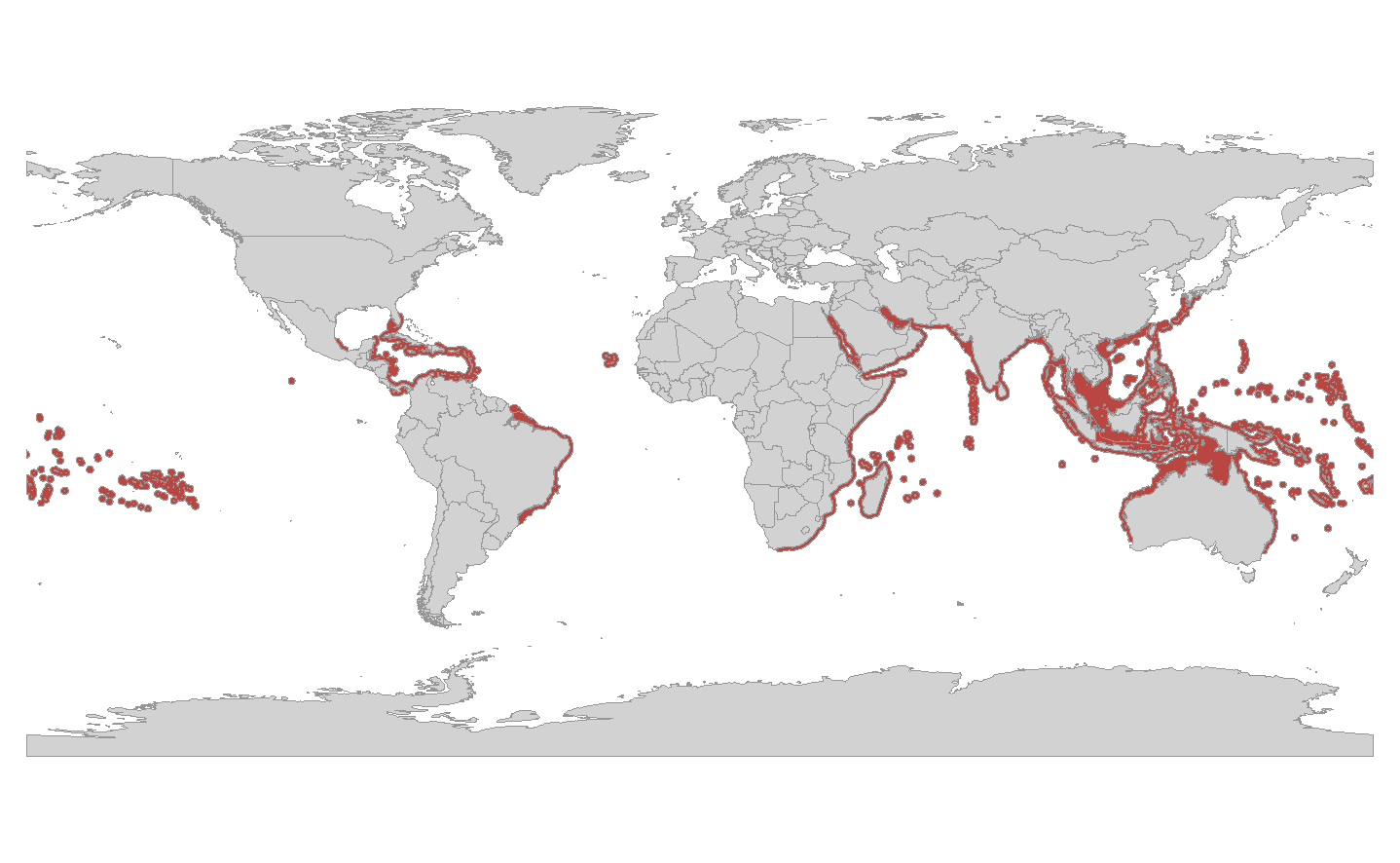
- Fire coral range

Synonyms
- (Family): Milleporadae (lapsus); (Genus): Palmipora de Blainville, 1830

= Fire coral =

Genus of hydrozoans

Fire corals (Millepora) are a genus of colonial marine organisms that exhibit physical characteristics similar to that of stony coral. While coral is in the name, fire corals are not true (stony) corals but are instead more closely related to Hydra and other hydrozoans, making them a part of the organism known as hydrocorals. Fire Corals make up the only genus in the monotypic family Milleporidae.

The name "fire coral" comes from not only the flame like shape of the corals branches or the yellow, orange, and brown colors, but, also because of the burning sensation felt by victims when they get stung by this species.

== Anatomy and Reproduction ==
While most fire corals are yellow or orange, they can also be found in shades of brown, green, and even blue, providing a vibrant display underwater.

Fire coral has several common growth forms; these include branching, plate, and encrusting. Branching fire coral adopts a calcareous structure which branches off into rounded, finger-like tips. Plate-growing fire coral forms a shape similar to that of fellow cnidarian lettuce corals - erect, thin sheets, which group together to form a colony. In encrusting fire coral, growth takes place on the surface structure of calcareous coral or gorgonian structures.

The gonophores in the family Milleporidae arise from the coenosarc (the hollow living tubes of the upright branching individuals of a colony), within chambers embedded entirely in the coenosteum (the calcareous mass forming the skeleton of a compound coral).

Reproduction in fire corals is more complex than in other reef-building corals. It begins when the polyp of fire coral releases a medusa. This medusa then distributes its eggs in the water stream. Next, another male medusa fertilizes the eggs with its sperm, which produces a planula. After that, this planula floats in the water until it finds a reef it is able to attach to and grow back into a polyp, settling on a hard surface. Finally, the cycle repeats.

== Biology and Behaviors ==
Most of the polyps of fire corals can be found embedded in the skeleton. They are microscopic in size and connected by a network of minute canals. All that is visible on the smooth surface are two types of pores: gastropores and dactylopores. These pores work together as a system to capture prey and provide the coral with nutrients. This process starts with dactylozooids, which are long, hair-like stinging polyps that protrude from the dactylopores and possess clusters of stinging cells. These dactylozooids first capture the prey then the prey obtained is engulfed by gastrozooids, or feeding polyps, which are situated within the gastropores. While this method of capturing prey is one form of obtaining nutrients, fire corals also gain nutrients via their special symbiotic relationship with algae known as zooxanthellae. The zooxanthellae live inside the tissues of the coral, and provide the coral with food, which they produce through photosynthesis, therefore requiring sunlight. In return, the coral provides the algae with protection and access to this said sunlight. The hollow tubes in fire coral can also be used to store oxygen to offset any organism that bumps into it.

== Stings, symptoms, and treatments ==
Upon initial contact with fire coral, an intense pain can be felt. This feeling of pain can last from two days to two weeks. Occasional relapses of post-treatment inflammation are common. Prominent side effects can include skin irritation, stinging or burning pain, erythema (skin redness), fever, and/or urticarial (hives) lesions. These side effects are due to venom released from the nematocyte, as venom is part of the defense mechanism of the fire coral. Despite its mild to moderate potential for pain, the venom is nonlethal to humans. The very small nematocysts on fire corals contain tentacles, protruding from numerous surface pores (similar to jellyfish stingers). In addition, fire corals have a sharp, calcified external skeleton that can scrape the skin and cause further irritation.

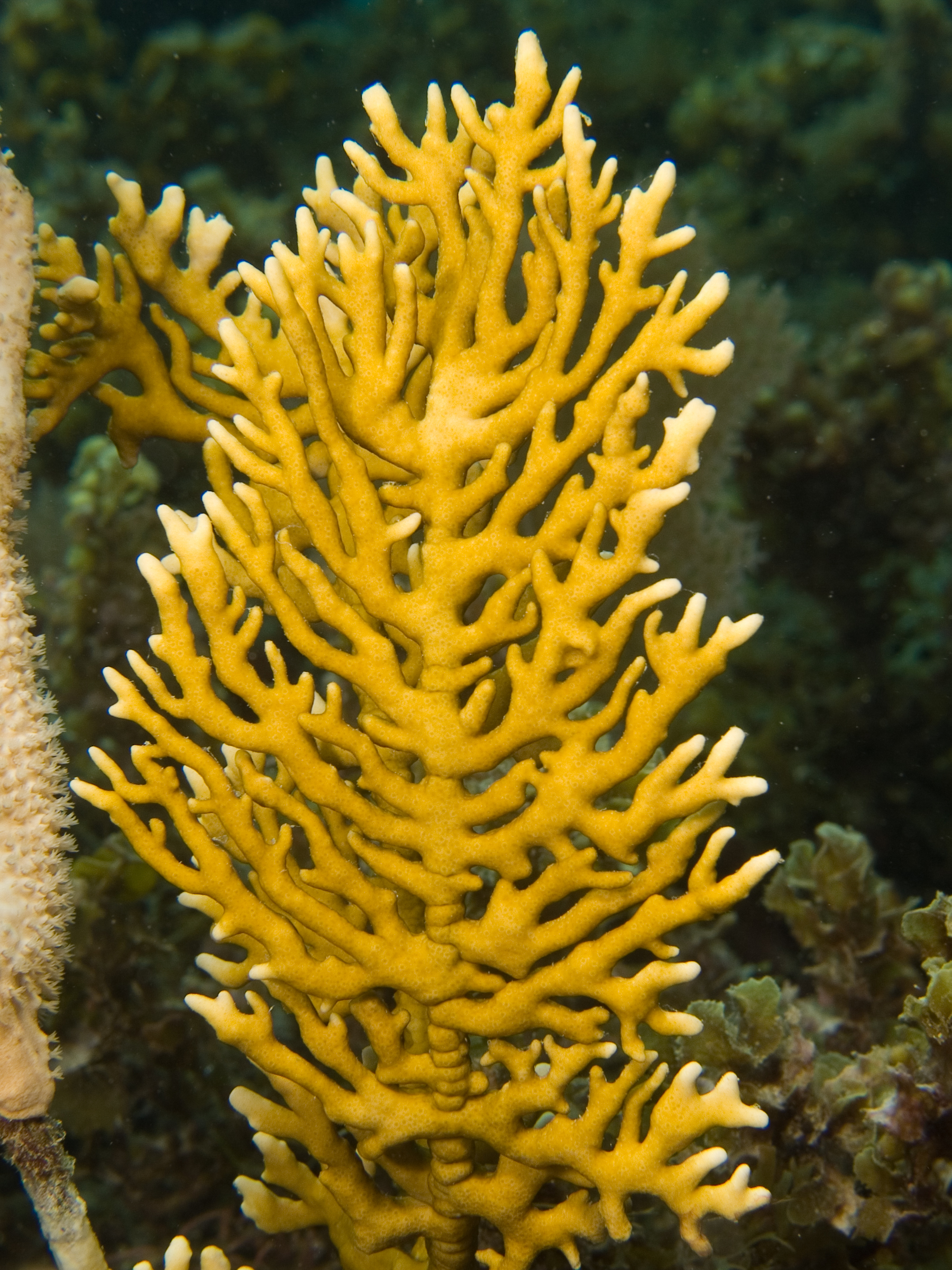
Image of Branching Fire Coral- Millepora Alcicornis

The following treatments are suggestions; always seek a medical professional first.

1. Rinse with seawater. Freshwater will cause the cnidae to release more venom, which will increase pain, so stay clear of freshwater.
2. Apply vinegar or isopropyl alcohol. This helps to deactivate the venom.
3. Heat can also help to deactivate the venom.
4. Remove any parts of the fire coral; tweezers and tape work very well.
5. Keep the infected area still because movement can cause the venom to spread.
6. Apply hydrocortisone cream two to three times daily as needed for itching. Stop immediately if any signs of infection appear.

Again, these are just suggestions; always seek a medical professional first.

== Habitat and Predators ==
Fire corals are found on reefs in tropical and subtropical waters, such as the Indian Ocean, Pacific Ocean, and Atlantic Ocean and the Caribbean Sea. They are found in shallow reefs where the most sunlight is able to reach them, allowing for a higher rate of photosynthesis of the algae that lives in their tissues. Fire corals thrive in an environment with a high, strong current, and warm water. They are found in almost all places in the world, except for cold coastal regions. They are also abundant on upper reef slopes and in lagoons, and can occur down to 40 meters (131 ft) in depth from the surface.

Fire corals' predatory threats are mainly from fire worms, certain nudibranchs, and filefish. They are also predators to the algae that lives within them, as well as zooplankton/phytoplankton.

== Threats and conservation ==
Fire corals continue to face the many threats that are impacting coral reefs globally, including poor land management, practices that release more sediment, nutrients, and pollutants into the oceans, and other stress on the fragile reef ecosystem. They are also effected by Overfishing, as it has ‘knock-on’ effects that result in the increase of macroalgae that can outcompete and smother corals. Additionally, certain methods of fishing can be destructive to and physically devastate the reef. A further potential threat is the increase of coral bleaching events, as a result of global climate change.

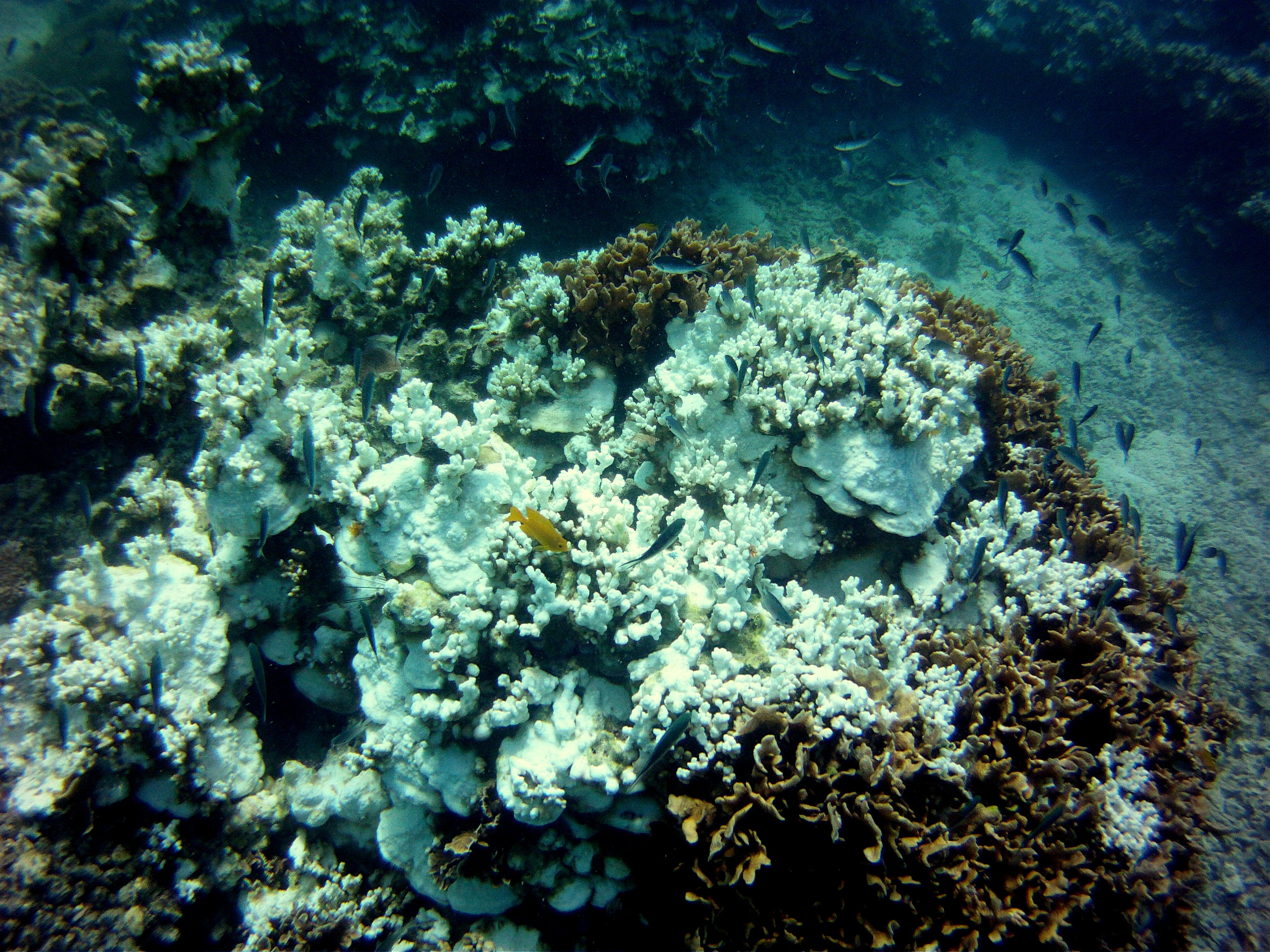
Coral Bleaching Event in the Gulf of Thailand

Coral bleaching is a major threat to all types of coral. Coral bleaching is when the coral expels the zooxanthella that they feed on, which causes them to turn white, hence "bleaching." Corals cannot live long in this state, but these events can be reversed. If environmental conditions return to normal, then the zooxanthella can return to its original position and the coral that has been affected will begin to become healthy again.

Most fire coral species have brittle skeletons, meaning they can easily be broken. Common instances where they can be broken include during storms, by divers when diving for leisure, or even when collecting fish for the aquarium trade. For instance, the yellowtail damselfish (Chrysiptera parasema) tends to dwell close to the branching fire coral colonies, and retreats into its branches when threatened. In Brazil, fire coral colonies are extensively damaged when harvesting the yellowtail damselfish, as the corals are often deliberately smashed and fishes hiding amongst the branches are ‘shaken out’ into plastic bags.

As of today, Fire Corals are listed on Appendix II of the Convention on International Trade in Endangered Species (CITES) under Class Hydrozoa.

== Species ==
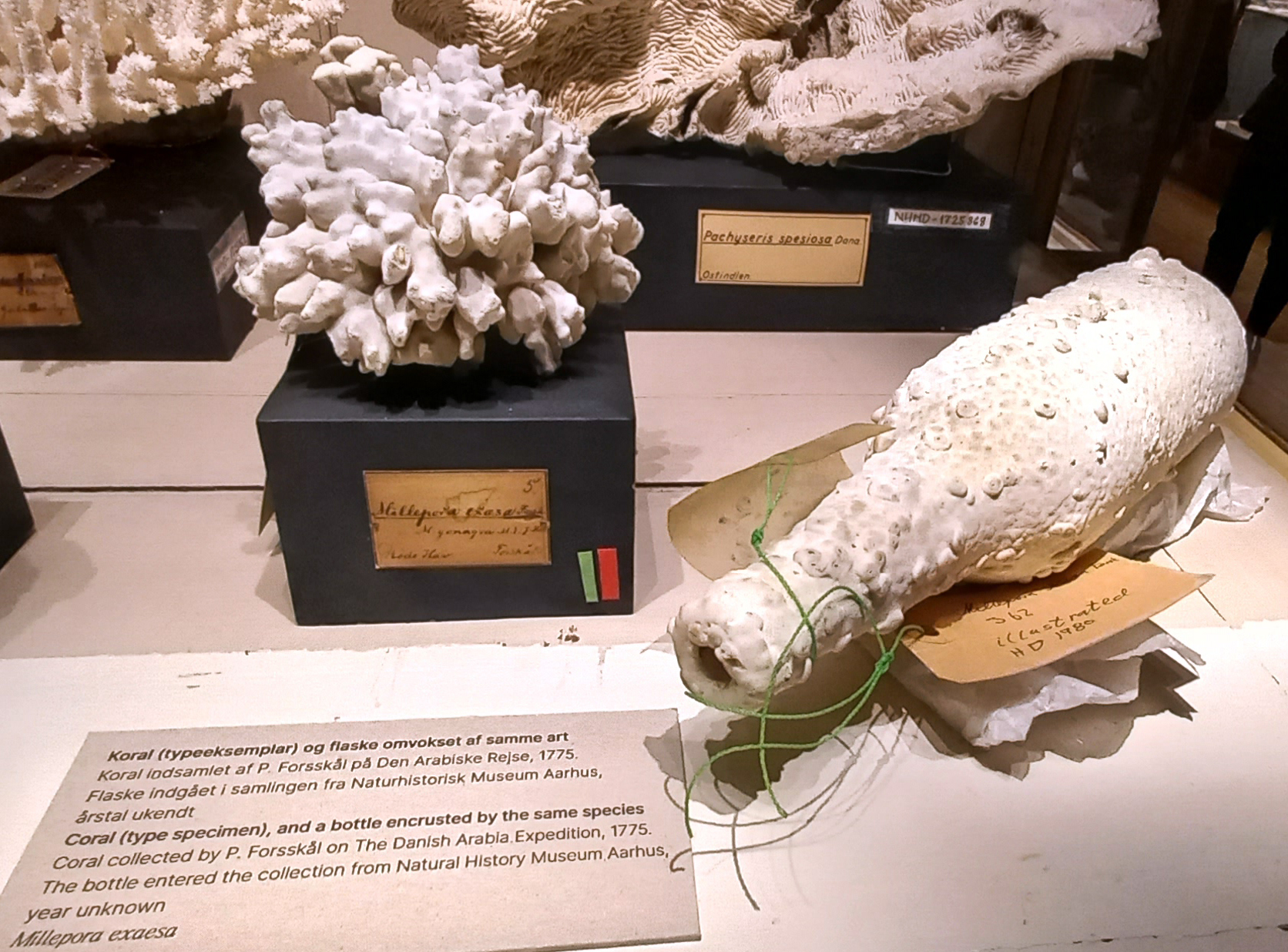
Millepora exaesa holotype specimen and bottle encrusted by the species, Natural History Museum of Denmark

As of 2026, sixteen species of Fire Coral that have been recognized.

- Millepora alcicornis Linnaeus, 1758
- Millepora boschmai de Weerdt & Glynn, 1991
- Millepora braziliensis Verrill, 1868
- Millepora complanata Lamarck, 1816
- Millepora dichotoma (Forsskål, 1775)
- Millepora exaesa (Forsskål, 1775)
- Millepora foveolata Crossland, 1952
- Millepora intricata Milne-Edwards & Haime, 1860
- Millepora laboreli Amaral, 2008
- Millepora latifolia Boschma, 1948
- Millepora nitida Verrill, 1868
- Millepora nodulosa Nemenzo, 1984
- Millepora platyphylla Hemprich & Ehrenberg, 1834
- Millepora squarrosa Lamarck, 1816
- Millepora striata Duchassaing & Michelotti, 1864
- Millepora tenera Boschma, 1948
