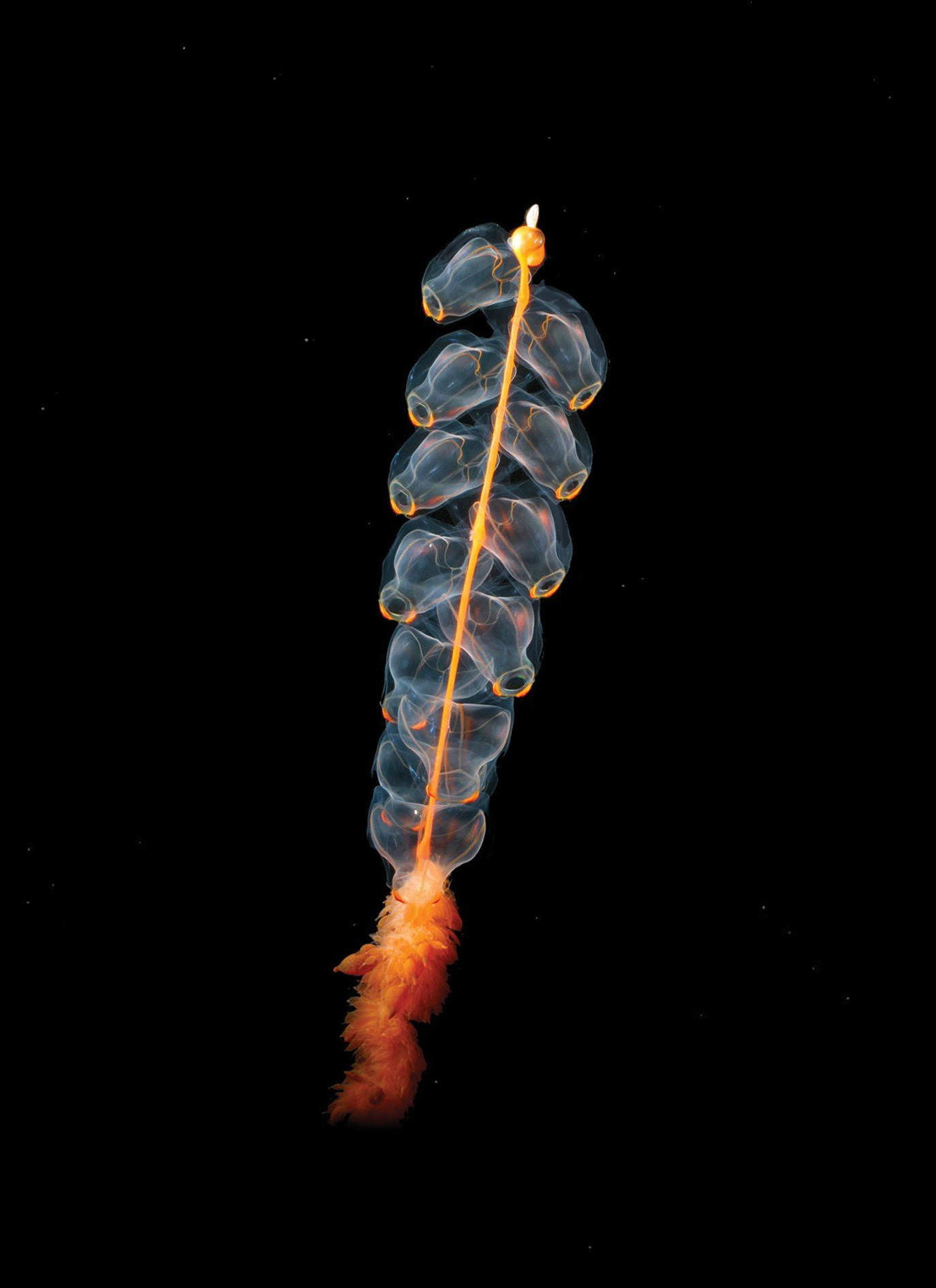

Scientific classification
- Kingdom: Animalia
- Phylum: Cnidaria
- Class: Hydrozoa
- Order: Siphonophorae
- Family: Agalmatidae
- Genus: Marrus
- Species: M. orthocanna

Binomial name
- Marrus orthocanna (Kramp, 1942)

Synonyms
- Stephanomia orthocanna Kramp, 1942

= Marrus orthocanna =

Species of hydrozoan

Marrus orthocanna is a species of pelagic siphonophore, a colonial animal composed of a complex arrangement of zooids, some of which are polyps and some medusae. Swimming independently in the mid-ocean, it lives in the Arctic and other cold, deep waters. It is a colonial creature that is born from a single egg which is fertilized. Later on, a protozoan forms that eventually grows to form more duplicating members of the colony. It belongs to the order Siphonophorae and the genus Marrus, which also includes M. antarcticus, M. claudanielis, and M. orthocannoides.

== Description ==
Like other siphonophores, Marrus orthocanna is a colony composed of a number of specialised zooids linked together by a long stem. They have different functions such as locomotion, capturing prey, waste removal, and reproduction. At the front is the pneumatophore, an orange-colored, gas-filled float, the largest of which can reach estimated sizes of 5–10 centimeters in diameter. Behind this is the nectosome, a region where there are a number of translucent nectophores with red, unlooped radial canals. These are bell-shaped medusae specialised for locomotion. When they contract, water is expelled which causes the colony to move. The coordinations of the medusae contractions enable the organism to swim forwards, sidewards, or backwards. The remaining region is the siphosome. Most of the zooids here are polyps, specialised for collecting food. They do this for the whole colony, spreading their single long tentacles in the water to snare prey. There are also stinging cells that release munitions of toxins that kills or paralyzes the prey. Other zooids in this region undertake digestion and assimilation of food items. Reproductive medusae are found among the polyps in the siphosome and also various other specialised zooids. The various forms are all arranged in a repeating pattern. The main foods of this organism are decapods, krill and other smaller crustaceans.

== Distribution and habitat ==
Marrus orthocanna occurs pelagically in the mesopelagic zone of the Arctic Ocean, the northwestern Pacific Ocean, the Bering Sea, the Sea of Okhotsk, the north Atlantic Ocean and the Mediterranean Sea. It is found at depths ranging between 200 and 800 m (660 and 2,620 ft). The greatest depth at which it has been observed is about 2,000 m (6,600 ft). At these depths the temperature is about 4 °C (39 °F), hardly any light penetrates from the surface and human observation is limited to what can be seen from submersible craft.

== Behavior ==
Like most other siphonophores, pelagic siphonophores are active swimmers. When its bell-shaped echo is contracted, water is pushed out causing the flock to move. The medusa's contractions are coordinated to allow the animal to swim forward, sideways, or backward. It belongs to the family Agalmatidae, they can be found in the deep ocean waters of the Pacific and Atlantic Oceans, and they have asexual reproduction.

== Biology ==
Marrus orthocanna can reach lengths of 2-3 meters long and the tentacles can extend fifty centimeters on either side. It moves forward intermittently before pausing to put out its "fishing lines", ready to ensnare passing creatures. It is a carnivore whose diet is thought to consist mainly of small crustaceans such as decapods, krill, copepods and mysids.

This colonial animal arises from a single fertilised egg. The protozooid that develops from this subsequently buds to form the other members of the colony which are thus genetically identical. The protozooid first thins and elongates, the middle section becoming the stem of the colony. The pneumatophore forms at the opposite end to the mouth. Next a growth zone on the thin stem forms and budding occurs with the formation of the nectophores. As the stem continues lengthening, further zooids develop above these. Another growth zone sees the development of the siphosome and the continuing elongation of the stem carries these zooids down with it. The division of labor among the zooids is an evolutionary advance in the constant struggle for existence in the deep sea. Such organisms as Marrus orthocanna blur the boundaries between the individual polyp and the whole colonial organism; each cannot exist without the other.

== History ==
The first siphonophorae to be described was the Portuguese Man O'War in 1758 by Carl Linnaeus. Until the 19th century, only three more species were described. However in the 19th century itself, 56 new species of siphonophorae were discovered and described. The family Marrus was not discovered until the early 20th century, by A.K. Totton, a British researcher who discovered new species during his lifetime. Marrus orthocanna itself was discovered by Paul Lassenius Kramp as part of the Godthaab Expedition of 1928, as they explored the area to the west of Greenland looking specifically at phytoplankton. A book about the expedition that detailed the Marrus orthocanna was released in 1942.

== See also ==
- Gelatinous zooplankton
