= Millepora boschmai =

Conservation status
- Data Deficient (IUCN 3.1)
- CITES Appendix II (CITES)

Scientific classification
- Kingdom: Animalia
- Phylum: Cnidaria
- Class: Hydrozoa
- Order: Anthoathecata
- Family: Milleporidae
- Genus: Millepora
- Species: M. boschmai

Binomial name
- Millepora boschmai De Weerdt and Glynn 1991

Species of hydrozoan

Millepora boschmai is a species of fire coral. It was previously catalogued in two protected areas in Panama, the Coiba National Park and the Golfo de Chiriquí National Park.

This species was typically found in upper, forereef slopes to deep sand and rubble slopes but they were most abundant at the reef base and deeper outer slopes.

== Conservation status ==
Although this species was previously classified as Possibly Extinct by the IUCN in 2008, this species is still poorly understood, and therefore was given the Data Deficient category in 2024. However, it is still considered rare.
