= Halistemma =

Scientific classification
- Domain: Eukaryota
- Kingdom: Animalia
- Phylum: Cnidaria
- Class: Hydrozoa
- Order: Siphonophorae
- Family: Agalmatidae
- Genus: Halistemma; Huxley, 1859

Genus of hydrozoans

Halistemma is a genus of cnidarians belonging to the family Agalmatidae.

The genus has almost cosmopolitan distribution.

Species:

- Halistemma cupulifera Lens & van Riemsdijk, 1908
- Halistemma foliacea (Quoy & Gaimard, 1833)
- Halistemma maculatum Pugh & Baxter, 2014
- Halistemma rubrum (Vogt, 1852)
- Halistemma striata Totton, 1965
- Halistemma transliratum Pugh & Youngbluth, 1988
