= Athorybia lucida =

Scientific classification
- Kingdom: Animalia
- Phylum: Cnidaria
- Class: Hydrozoa
- Order: Siphonophorae
- Family: Agalmatidae
- Genus: Athorybia
- Species: A. lucida

Binomial name
- Athorybia lucida Biggs, 1978

Species of hydrozoan

Athorybia lucida is a species of siphonophores in the family Agalmatidae. It was first described by Douglas C. Biggs in 1978. The species has a rare distribution, with only 8 specimens ever collected. It lives in the epipelagic zone, from 0-50 meters deep.
