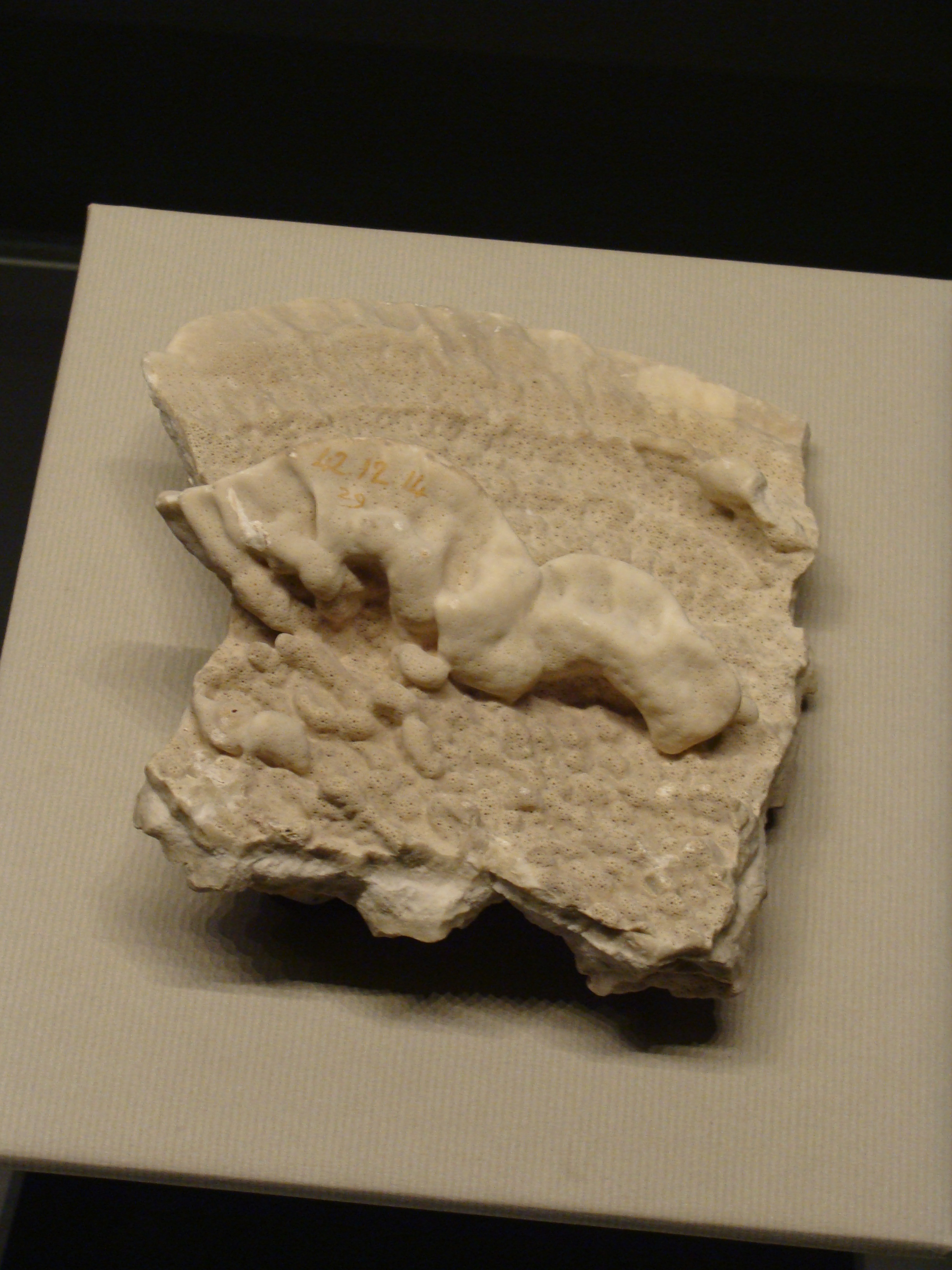

Conservation status
- Endangered (IUCN 3.1)
- CITES Appendix II (CITES)

Scientific classification
- Kingdom: Animalia
- Phylum: Cnidaria
- Class: Hydrozoa
- Order: Anthoathecata
- Family: Milleporidae
- Genus: Millepora
- Species: M. platyphylla

Binomial name
- Millepora platyphylla Hemprich & Ehrenberg, 1834

Synonyms
- Millepora Ehrenbergi Milne Edwards, 1860; Millepora incrassata Milne Edwards, 1860; Millepora insignis Verrill, 1864; Millepora porulosa Ehrenberg, 1834; Millepora verrucosa Milne Edwards, 1860

= Millepora platyphylla =

Species of hydrozoan

Millepora platyphylla is a species of fire coral, a type of hydrocoral, in the family Milleporidae. It is also known by the common names blade fire coral and plate fire coral. It forms a calcium carbonate skeleton and has toxic, defensive polyps that sting. It obtains nutrients by consuming plankton and via symbiosis with photosynthetic algae. The species is found from the Red Sea and East Africa to northern Australia and French Polynesia. It plays an important role in reef-building in the Indo-Pacific region. Depending on its environment, it can have a variety of different forms and structures.

== Description ==
From class Hydrozoa, Millepora platyphylla is not a true coral, distinguishing it from the stony corals and soft corals in class Anthozoa. Like other species of fire coral, it can have diverse growth forms, including branches, fans, plates, blades, or encrusting forms. However, they are generally characterized as plate-like or blade-like, which differentiates them from other species, such as Millepora dichotoma and Millepora exaesa. The morphologies of these corals vary based on the habitats they inhabit. While encrusting forms are better able to resist wave activity, exposed sheet tree forms coupled with the action of breaking waves may facilitate the coral's reproduction through fragmentation.

Similar to other reef-building corals, M. platyphylla constitutes colonies and possesses stinging cells called nematocysts. The presence of these stinging cells is what gives these fire corals their name, as contact with them leads to a burning sensation in humans. The coral has two types of polyps: gastrozooids for feeding and dactylozooids for defense. The structures of the polyps are specialized for their function. The gastrozooid consists of a circular perimeter of short tentacles around an oral cavity, while the dactylozooid lacks the cavity and instead has longer tentacles used for defensive purposes. These polyps occupy gastropores and dactylopores, respectively, arranged as cyclosystems. They have gonophores for reproductive organs.

The size of M. platyphylla colonies can be highly variable, though they often have diameters ranging from 200 to 300 centimeters and heights up to 200 centimeters. The corals can exhibit a yellow-green color or a light-brown color, though their tips may be white.

== Distribution ==
Millepora platyphylla has a wide geographic range, especially compared with those of other species like Millepora latifolia and Millepora tenera. It is commonly found in the Indo-Pacific, which encompasses the Red Sea and French Polynesia. Researchers have studied the species in Indonesia, Egypt, and Moorea, French Polynesia. For a period of time, it was presumed that the species no longer existed in the Eastern Pacific due to bleaching events. However, researchers have confirmed that its range now extends back to that location.

The species is found in the shallows of the reef crest, typically below 5 meters in depth, but they may also be found there at depths up to 10 meters. They can be found at the surf zone and spur and groove zone at depths up to 10 meters. They experience strong wave action around these depths.

== Biology ==
Millepora platyphylla obtains energy from a combination of zooplankton predation and symbiosis with photosynthetic zooxanthellae. The mouths of the gastrozooids open and close in response to the presence of food. The hairs of the fire coral facilitate the feeding process. Zooxanthellae live within the coral tissue, providing it with nutrients via photosynthesis and in turn receiving adequate shelter and better access to sunlight.

Reproduction occurs sexually or asexually. As a species that exhibits gonochorism, Millepora platyphylla releases medusoid reproductive buds, which in turn release gametes into the water for external fertilization. The resulting planula larvae calcify into a polyp after 1 day. Asexual reproduction occurs through the process of fragmentation.

While adults are sessile, planula larvae have the ability to swim or crawl before settling on substrate and undergoing metamorphoses. Fragments of existing colonies can disperse in turbulent waters, colonizing nearby reef areas.
