= Gloeodinium viscum =

Scientific classification
- (unranked): SAR
- Phylum: Dinoflagellata
- Class: Dinophyceae
- Order: Phytodiniales
- Family: Pfiesteriaceae
- Genus: Gloeodinium
- Species: G. viscum

Binomial name
- Gloeodinium viscum Banaszak, Iglestas-Prieto & Trench, 1993

Species of single-celled organism

Gloeodinium viscum is a dinoflagellate symbiont of Millepora dichotoma.
