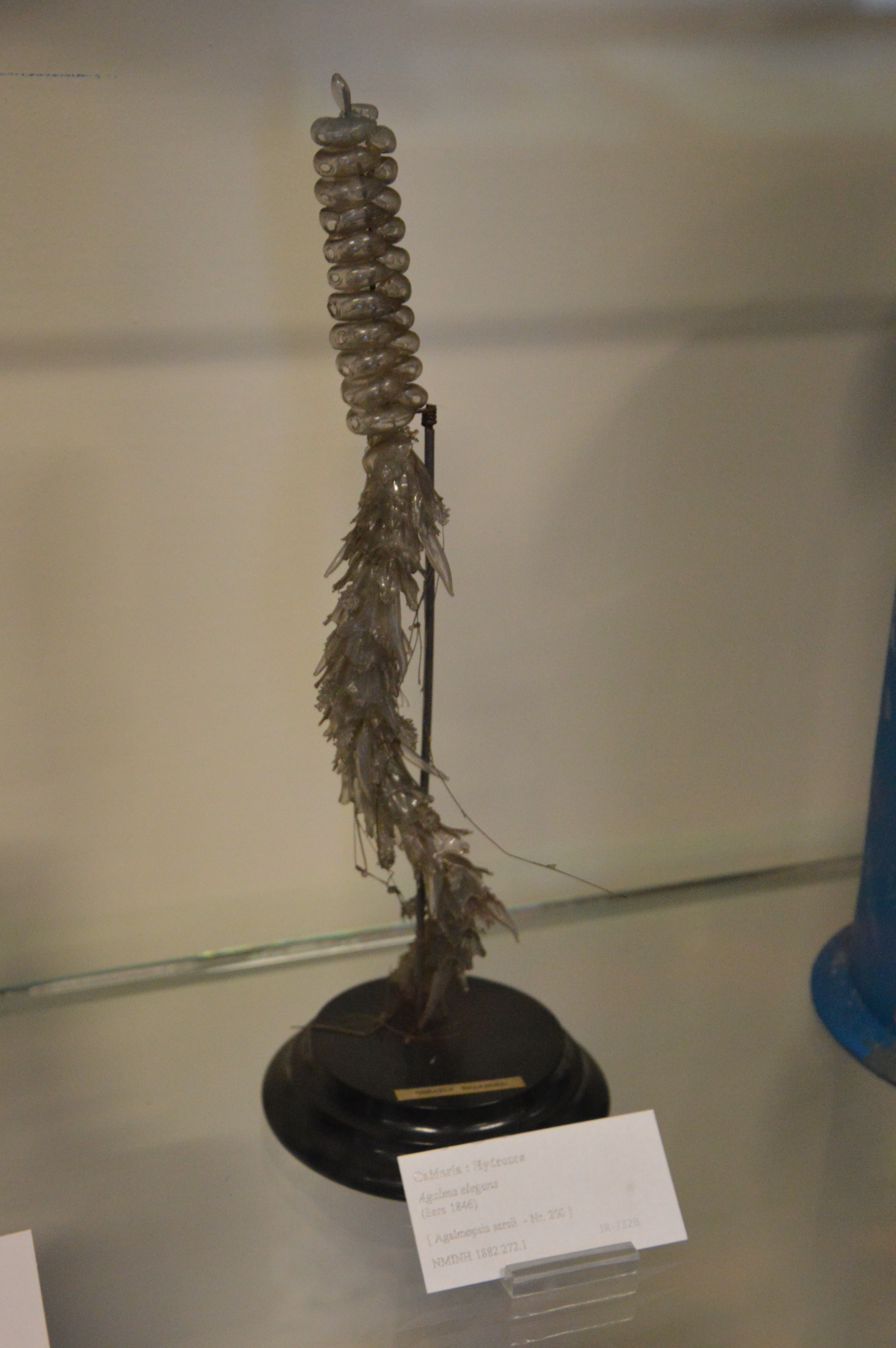
- Agalma elegans at the Natural History Museum (National Museum of Ireland) in Dublin.

Scientific classification
- Domain: Eukaryota
- Kingdom: Animalia
- Phylum: Cnidaria
- Class: Hydrozoa
- Order: Siphonophorae
- Family: Agalmatidae
- Genus: Agalma
- Species: A. elegans

Binomial name
- Agalma elegans (Sars, 1846)

Synonyms
- Agalmopsis elegans Sars, 1846

= Agalma elegans =

Species of hydrozoan

Agalma elegans is a species of siphonophores in the family Agalmatidae. It has been found in a wide variety of locations, including between the Reloncavi Fjord and the Boca del Guafo Passage, in the Chiloe Inland Sea (CIS), Chile.
