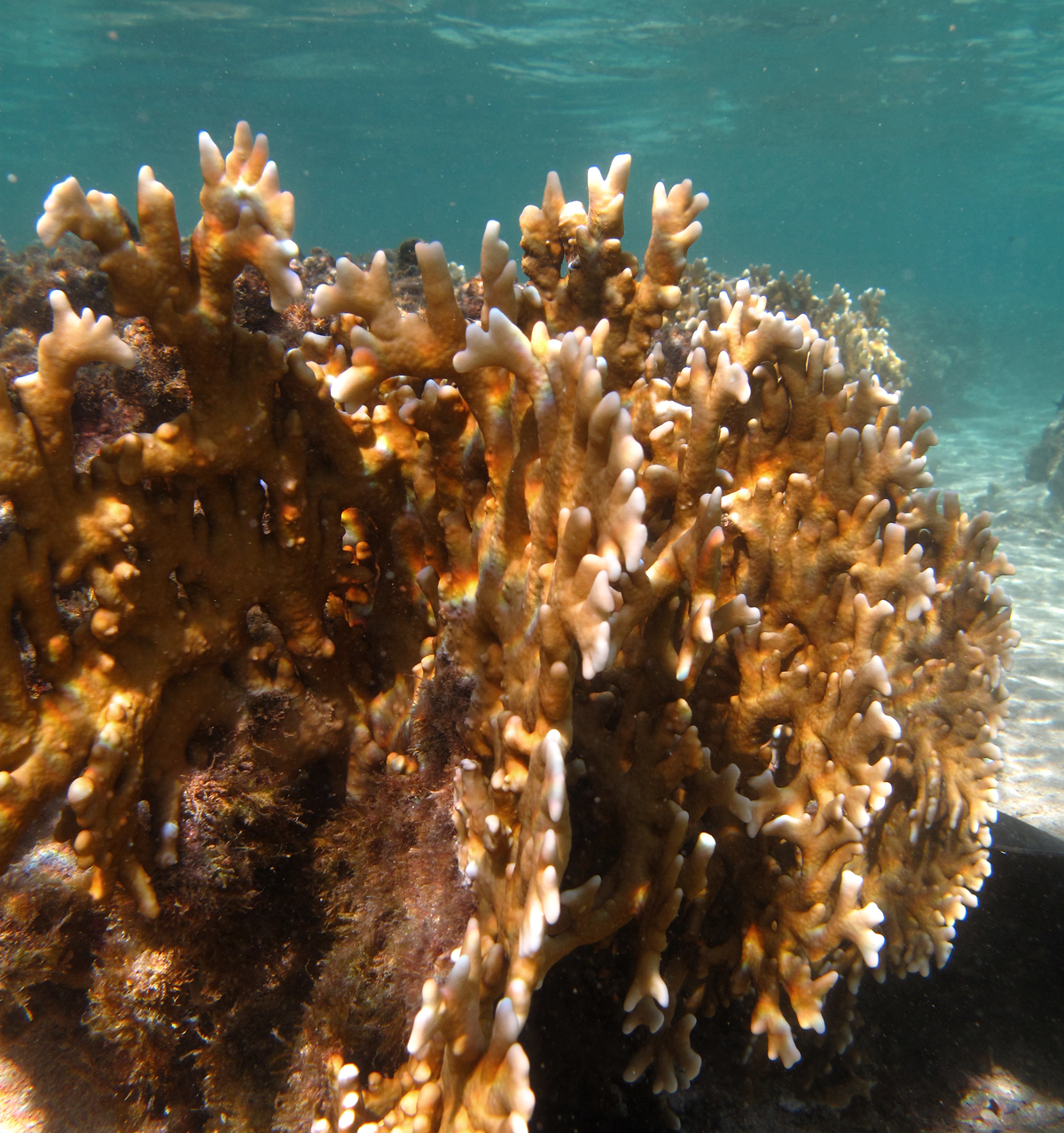

Conservation status
- Endangered (IUCN 3.1)
- CITES Appendix II

Scientific classification
- Kingdom: Animalia
- Phylum: Cnidaria
- Class: Hydrozoa
- Order: Anthoathecata
- Family: Milleporidae
- Genus: Millepora
- Species: M. tenera

Binomial name
- Millepora tenera Boschma, 1949

Synonyms
- Millepora cruzi Nemenzo, 1975; Millepora tenella Ortmann, 1892; Millepora tortuosa Dana, 1848

= Millepora tenera =

Species of hydrozoan

Millepora tenera is a species of fire coral in the family Milleporidae. It is native to the Red Sea and the western Indo-Pacific region and is a zooxanthellate species with a calcareous skeleton. It was first described in 1949 by the Dutch zoologist Hilbrand Boschma.

== Distribution and habitat ==
Millepora tenera is native to the western Indo-Pacific. Its range extends from the Red Sea and the eastern coast of Africa to much of Southeast Asia, Australia, American Samoa, and the Mariana Islands. It is found at depths no greater than 15 metres (49 ft), often in turbid locations where it is tolerant of some degree of siltation.

== Toxicity ==
Like other fire corals, Millepora tenera can cause painful rashes when touched by bare skin. Extracts of this coral contain neurotoxins, and can cause convulsions, respiratory failure and death in mice. The extract causes hemolysis, contains a dermonecrotic factor and has antigenic properties. Rabbits immunised with the extract developed neutralising antibodies that were protective against hemolysis, dermonecrosis and death. The antiserum could also be used to protect against the toxins present in an extract of Millepora alcicornis.

== Conservation status ==
Millepora tenera has a wide range and is common over much of that range. It is subject to coral diseases and is uniquely susceptible to coral bleaching. Under adverse environmental conditions, and like other corals, is threatened by degradation of its coral reef habitat. However it is a rather weed-like species, and is one of the first species to recolonise damaged reefs, though it may take over 8 years to reach maturity. The International Union for Conservation of Nature changed its status from Least Concern in 2014 to Endangered in 2022.
