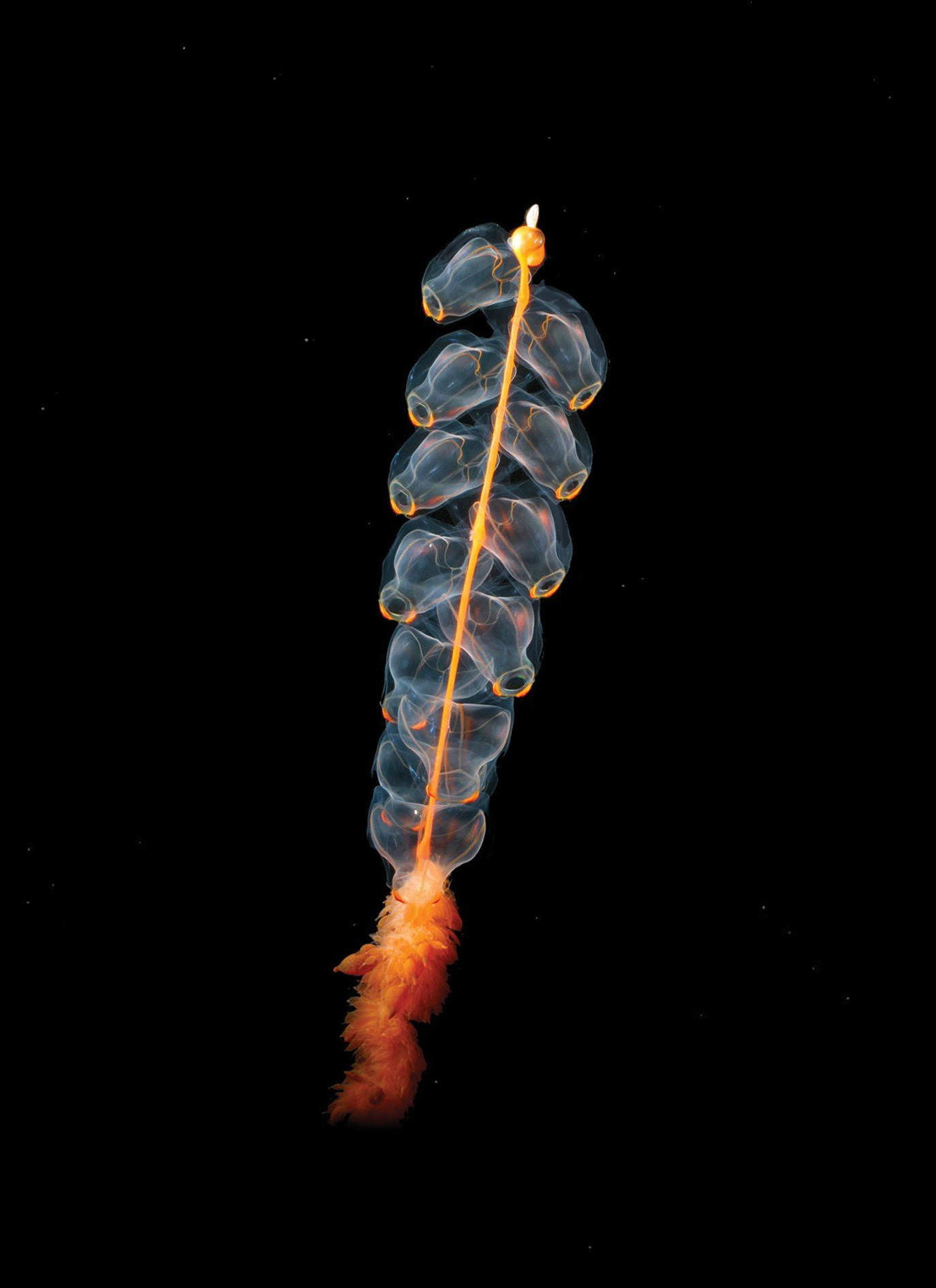
- Marrus orthocanna

Scientific classification
- Domain: Eukaryota
- Kingdom: Animalia
- Phylum: Cnidaria
- Class: Hydrozoa
- Order: Siphonophorae
- Family: Agalmatidae
- Genus: Marrus; Totton, 1954

= Marrus =

Genus of hydrozoans

Marrus is a genus of siphonophores. Species include:

- Marrus antarcticus Totton, 1954
- Marrus claudanielis Dunn, Pugh & Haddock, 2005
- Marrus orthocanna Kramp, 1942
- Marrus orthocannoides Totton, 1954
