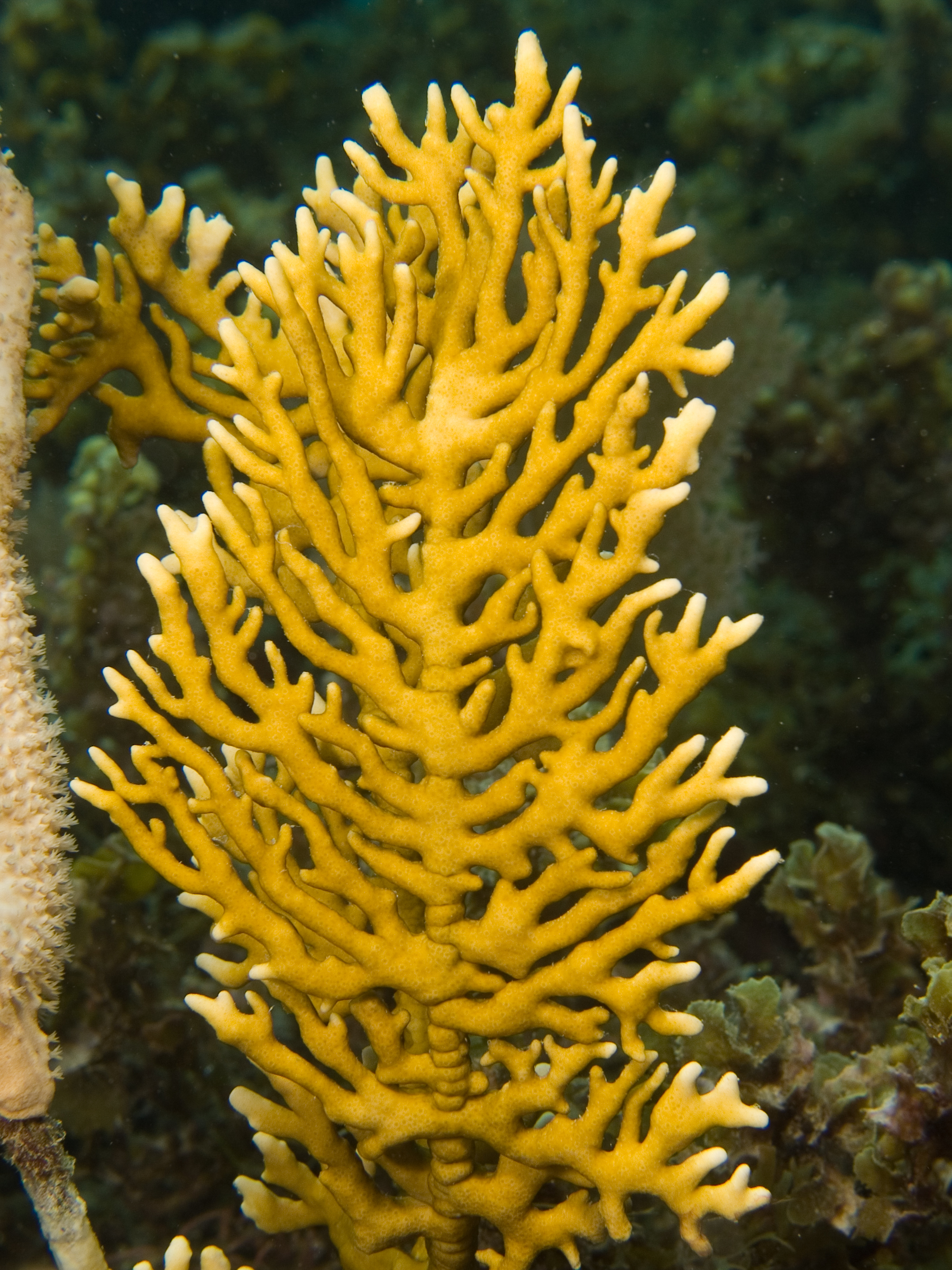

Conservation status
- Endangered (IUCN 3.1)
- CITES Appendix II

Scientific classification
- Kingdom: Animalia
- Phylum: Cnidaria
- Class: Hydrozoa
- Order: Anthoathecata
- Family: Milleporidae
- Genus: Millepora
- Species: M. alcicornis

Binomial name
- Millepora alcicornis Linnaeus, 1758

Synonyms
- List: Millepora candida Duchassaing & Michelotti, 1864; Millepora carthaginiensis Duchassaing & Michelotti, 1864; Millepora crista-galli Duchassaing & Michelotti, 1864; Millepora delicatula Duchassaing & Michelotti, 1864; Millepora digitata Duchassaing & Michelotti, 1864; Millepora Esperi Duchassaing & Michelotti, 1864; Millepora fenestrata Duchassaing & Michelotti, 1864; Millepora forskali Milne Edwards, 1860; Millepora gothica Duchassaing & Michelotti, 1860; Millepora moniliformis Dana, 1848; Millepora pumila Dana, 1848; Millepora schrammi Duchassaing & Michelotti, 1864; Millepora trinitatis Duchassaing & Michelotti, 1864; Palmipora fasciculata Duchassaing, 1850; Palmipora parasitica Duchassaing, 1850

= Millepora alcicornis =

Species of hydrozoan

Millepora alcicornis, or sea ginger, is a species of fire coral with a calcareous skeleton. It is found on shallow water coral reefs in the tropical west Atlantic Ocean. It shows a variety of different morphologies depending on its location. It feeds on plankton and derives part of its energy requirements from microalgae found within its tissues. It is an important member of the reef building community and subject to the same threats as other corals. It can cause painful stings to unwary divers.

== Taxonomy ==
Millepora alcicornis is not a true coral in class Anthozoa but is in class Hydrozoa, and is more closely related to jellyfish than stony corals. Because of the variability in growth habit that this coral exhibits, it has been the subject of much confusion as to its taxonomy, being described under a number of different names from different localities. In 1898, Hickson decided that the variations in morphology were due to environmental factors and that Millepora alcicornis was the valid name for all these species. This conclusion has since been questioned.

The species was first described by Carl Linnaeus in his landmark 1758 10th edition of Systema Naturae, but his type locality is unknown. The scientific name comes from the Latin with Millepora meaning "thousand-pored" and alcicornis meaning "elk-horned". It seems likely that the type locality is in fact the West Indies. Explaining this in 1941 Crossland wrote "I cannot resist the remark that the one thing quite certain about the many forms of Millepora is that none of them have any resemblance to an elk's horn, except perhaps that from the West Indies".

== Description ==
The morphology of Millepora alcicornis is very variable. Most colonies probably start as encrusting forms and adopt a branching structure as they grow. The encrustations can become established on a variety of structures, not only on coral reefs and rocks but also on dead corals and the hulls of wrecked ships. Later development is in the form of plates or blades in habitats with much water movement such as the surf-pounded outer edges of reefs. In calmer waters, such as in deep lagoons or more sheltered parts of the reef, a more upright, leafy or branched structure develops which can grow to 50 centimetres (20 in) tall. The habit of growth is also influenced by the inclination of the surface on which the fire coral grows. On vertical surfaces, the encrusting bases are larger with longer perimeters and the density of branching is lower than it is on horizontal surfaces. The cylindrical branches usually grow in a single plane and span a range of hues from brown to pale, cream-like yellow, while branch tips are white.

Embedded in the calcareous skeleton are numerous microscopic polyps. They are connected internally by a system of canals and are concealed behind pores in the skeleton, the surface of which is smooth and lacks the corallites of true stony corals. The polyps have specialist functions, the gastrozooids processing and digesting the food caught by the dactylozooids which are grouped around them. The gastrozooids are small and plump and extend four to six tentacle stubs through their pores but are otherwise invisible. The dactylozooids have hairlike tentacles covered in cnidoblasts. Stings from the cnidocysts immobilize an item of prey and the tentacles thrust it through the mouth of an adjacent gastrozooid, from where it passes into the stomach for digestion. The polyps also extrude the coenosteum, the calcareous material of which the skeleton is composed. The coenosteum contains certain symbiotic microalgae called zooxanthellae. These are photosynthetic organisms which provide their hosts with energy and in return benefit from a protective environment in a well lit position. About 75% of the fire coral's energy requirements are provided by the zooxanthellae.

== Distribution ==
Millepora alcicornis is found in the Caribbean Sea, the Gulf of Mexico, Florida, the Cape Verde Islands, and along the coast of Central and South America as far south as Brazil. More recently Colonies have also appeared in the Canary Islands and on the island of Madeira. It has also been found in Bermuda, but the morphology at that location is so different from that in the rest of its range that it may be a distinct species. It grows at depths of up to 40 metres (130 ft) and is the only fire coral that often grows at depths greater than 10 metres (33 ft).

== Biology ==
Millepora alcicornis feeds on plankton. The tentacles of the dactylzooids are normally extended all the time. If an object is waved about above the coral, it will cause the tentacles to retract and then the coral can be handled without experiencing the painful stings caused by the cnidocytes.

Reproduction is by either asexual or sexual means. Parts of the coral may get detached from the colony by a storm or other means, and some of these fragments may end up in suitable locations to grow into new colonies which will be genetically identical to the parent colony. This fragmentation is probably the most frequent method of reproduction. Alternatively, certain pores called ampullae contain polyps that bud off short-lived, jellyfish-like medusae, which separate from the colony. They produce gametes which, after fertilisation, develop into planula larvae. These drift with the currents as part of the zooplankton before settling out and developing into new colonies.

== Ecology ==
A number of species of shrimp and fish take refuge among the branches of Millepora alcicornis, seemingly immune to the venom. Hawkfish in particular often perch on top of the fire coral, perhaps protected by their skinless pectoral fins. Perhaps unsurprisingly, Millepora alcicornis has few predators. The fireworm (Hermodice carunculata) sometimes grazes on it, but prefers other corals. Certain nudibranchs in the genus Phyllidia eat it as do filefish in the family Monacanthidae.

It has been found that when Millepora alcicornis grows in close proximity to an arborescent gorgonian sea fan, the fire coral becomes aggressive. It produces "attack" branches which grow out sideways towards the sea fan, develop into hand-like structures and encircle and smother it. The fire coral then uses it as a substrate for new growth. Sometimes this new growth gets separated from the parent colony, and a new colony of fire coral is formed, genetically identical to the original one. This aggressive action is specific to gorgonians and does not happen in response to the close presence of other live or dead corals, other sessile invertebrates or open water. The fire coral seems to be able to detect the gorgonian's presence as a result of water flowing over the surfaces of both.

== Threats ==
Although not a true coral, Millepora alcicornis is subject to the same general threats that corals and coral reefs are facing. The greatest of these is global warming and the consequent rise in sea temperatures. Millepora alcicornis is one of the first corals to show bleaching as the symbiont zooxanthellae are killed. However, it is also more resilient than most and becomes re-established by recruitment earlier than the scleractinian corals. Other general threats to reefs include ocean acidification, pollution, sedimentation, invasive species and other changes in species dynamics, coral diseases, fisheries, leisure activities and tourism. Small quantities of Millepora alcicornis are gathered for sale to collectors.

== Human interactions ==
The cnidocytes of Millepora alcicornis are powerful enough to sting human skin. They can inject a venom that causes a painful burning sensation, skin eruptions, blisters and scarring. The toxin has been investigated and is a water-soluble protein, 40 μg of which provides a median lethal dose to mice weighing 20 grams (0.71 oz).

Millepora alcicornis has no commercial uses but is sometimes kept in reef aquaria. It requires high water movement and bright light to flourish and its health can be judged by its colour, a yellow hue showing health whereas a darker brown colour can indicate too little light. It can be difficult to control because it grows fast and spreads over other objects in the tank.
