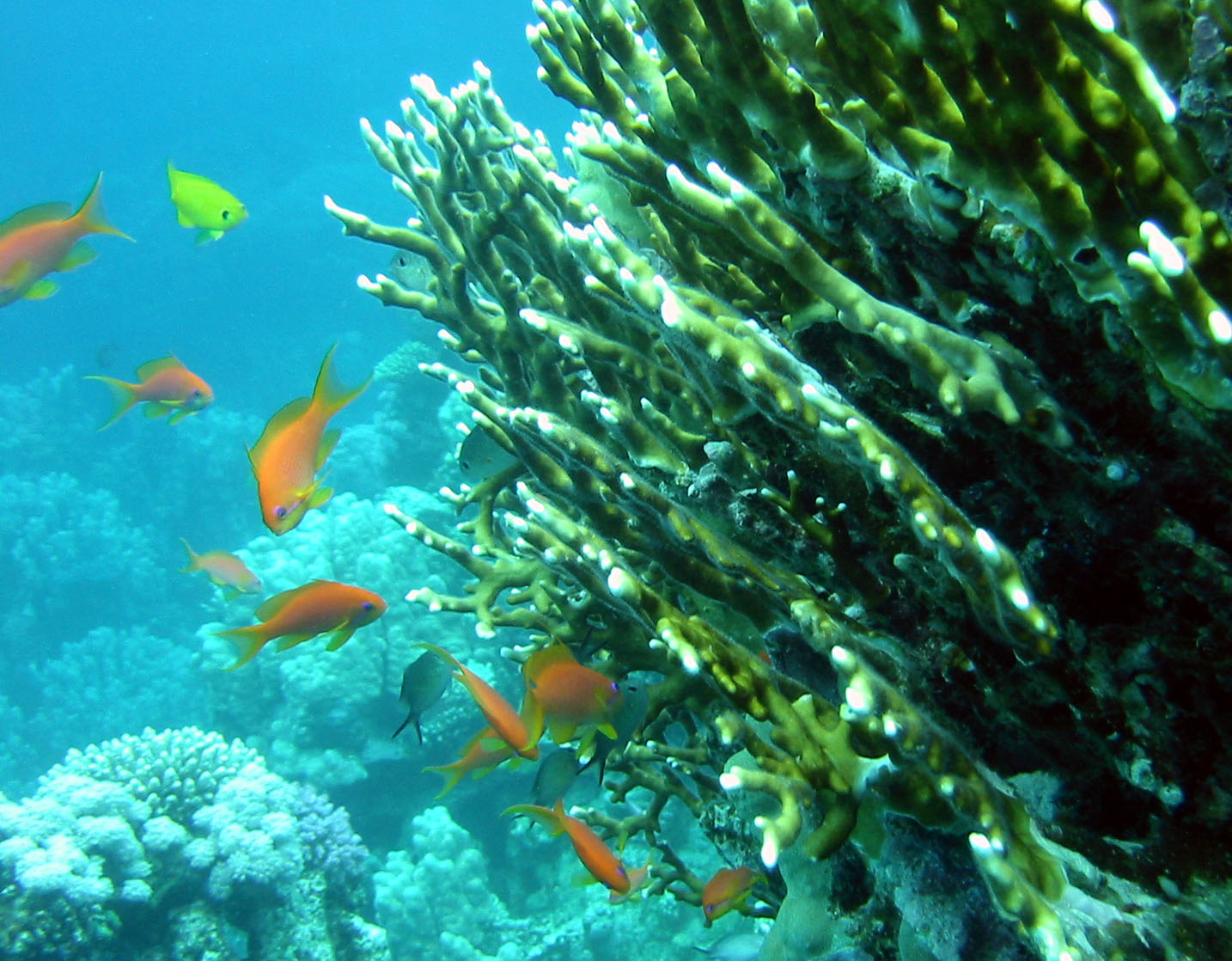

Conservation status
- Endangered (IUCN 3.1)
- CITES Appendix II

Scientific classification
- Kingdom: Animalia
- Phylum: Cnidaria
- Class: Hydrozoa
- Order: Anthoathecata
- Family: Milleporidae
- Genus: Millepora
- Species: M. dichotoma

Binomial name
- Millepora dichotoma Forsskål, 1775

Synonyms
- Millepora cancellata Ehrenberg, 1834; Millepora clavaria Ehrenberg, 1834; Millepora reticularis Milne Edwards, 1860

= Millepora dichotoma =

Net fire coral

Species of hydrozoan

Millepora dichotoma, the net fire coral, is a species of hydrozoan, consisting of a colony of polyps with a calcareous skeleton.

== Description ==
M. dichotoma is a colonial hermatypic coral with a calcareous endoskeleton. They form colonies up to 60 cm wide, but clumps of colonies may be several meters across. They initially build as encrusting coral, adhering themselves to hard substrate. The encrusting formations further develop into other growth forms, such as lace-like, leaf-like blades, and box-work. What growth form an individual develops into is highly dependent on the depth and location of growth as well as on the turbidity of the water in a given location. More fragile structures, such as lace-like, succeed better in deeper, less turbulent waters, whereas box-work forms are able to better succeed in harsher environments. As in other hermatypic corals, part of the metabolism of fire corals relies on zooxanthellae. Symbiotic zooxanthellae give M. dichotoma their vibrant colors, support structural growth, and assist with nutrient cycling. M. dichotoma is within the phylum cnidaria, which means they have nematocysts. Their nematocysts carry venom and are fatal to many organisms, but have not been found to be fatal to humans. However, they can cause humans extreme pain, burn-like wounds, and skin irritation that may continue for up to two weeks.

== Distribution ==
M. dichotoma can be found in the Republic of Mauritius, the Red Sea, and the Indo-West Pacific region. They are a benthic dwelling species that is most commonly found at depths of 0.2–3 meters.

== Diet ==
M. dichotoma are carnivorous suspension feeders. Polyps snare plankton and detritus from the surrounding waters and process their intake in their gastrovascular cavity.

== Reproduction ==
Reproduction occurs between April and May, but gametes can be present through June. A synchronized release of gametes is used to facilitate external fertilization. Male gametes are broadcast slightly before females release their eggs in order to achieve a higher success rate. During their multi-month reproduction period, there are multiple distinct times of gamete release. Fertilized gametes will disperse with currents and eventually settle on the seafloor to establish or add to colonies. After their planktonic stage, the polyps will settle and adhere to hard substrates, become hosts to symbiotic zooxanthellae, and build calcareous skeletons.

== Threats ==
M. dichotoma was classified as Endangered by the IUCN in 2022. Like others in the genus, it encounters physical damage from human activity, such as walking, snorkeling, and diving on and around them. Fragmentation of their colonies can create distinct structural changes. Growth may change from more fragile forms, such as lace-like, to a thicker and less fragile form, like box-work. Additionally, areas with anthropogenic nutrient addition have seen lower numbers of M. Dichotoma when observed over long periods of time. Similar to other coral species that are supported by symbiotic zooxanthellae, M. Dichotoma responds strongly to increases in ocean temperatures with bleaching events.

== See also ==
- Gloeodinium viscum, a dinoflagellate symbiont of millepora dichotoma
