= Colony (biology) =

Living things grouping together, usually for common benefit

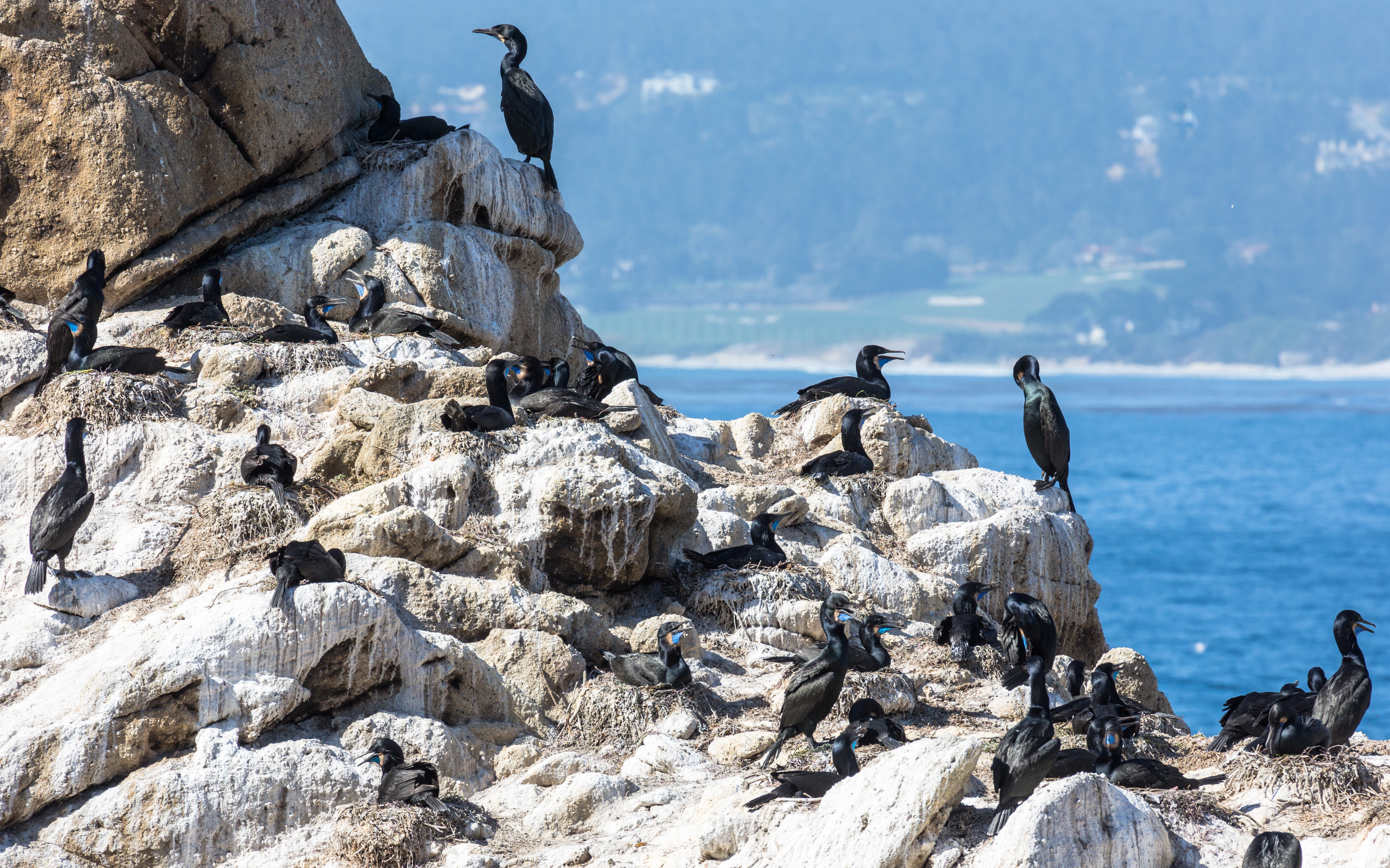
A colony of Brandt's cormorants in Point Lobos, California

In biology, a colony is composed of two or more conspecific individuals living in close association with, or connected to, one another. This association is usually for mutual benefit such as stronger defense or the ability to attack bigger prey.

Colonies can form in various shapes and ways depending on the organism involved. For instance, the bacterial colony is a cluster of identical cells (clones). These colonies often form and grow on the surface of (or within) a solid medium, usually derived from a single parent cell.

Colonies, in the context of development, may be composed of two or more unitary (or solitary) organisms or be modular organisms. Unitary organisms have determinate development (set life stages) from zygote to adult form and individuals or groups of individuals (colonies) are visually distinct. Modular organisms have indeterminate growth forms (life stages not set) through repeated iteration of genetically identical modules (or individuals), and it can be difficult to distinguish between the colony as a whole and the modules within. In the latter case, modules may have specific functions within the colony.

In contrast, solitary organisms – such as jaguars – do not associate with colonies; they are ones in which all individuals live independently and have all of the functions needed to survive and reproduce.

Some organisms are primarily independent and form facultative colonies in reply to environmental conditions while others must live in a colony to survive (obligate). For example, some carpenter bees will form colonies when a dominant hierarchy is formed between two or more nest foundresses (facultative colony), while corals are animals that are physically connected by living tissue (the coenosarc) that contains a shared gastrovascular cavity.

== Types ==
=== Social colonies ===
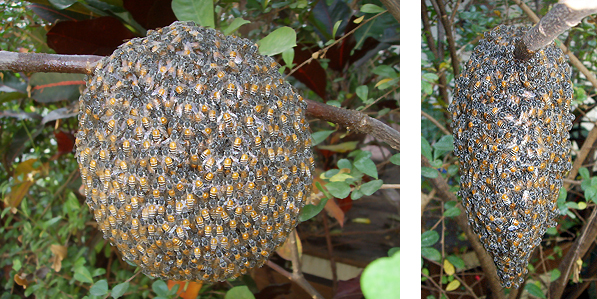
Apis florea colony, Thailand. The nest is 20 cm in diameter and contains approximately 3600 cells on each side. The curtain of bees covering the comb with the queen is 3–4 bees thick (~10 mm).

Unicellular and multicellular unitary organisms may aggregate to form colonies. For example,

- Protists such as slime molds are many unicellular organisms that aggregate to form colonies when food resources are hard to come by, as together they are more reactive to chemical cues released by preferred prey.
- Eusocial insects like ants and honey bees are multicellular animals that live in colonies with a highly organized social structure. Colonies of some social insects may be deemed superorganisms.
- Some animals, including various species of birds and mammals, form breeding or nesting colonies, potentially for more successful mating and to better protect offspring.
  - The Bracken Cave is the summer home to a colony of around 20 million Mexican free-tailed bats, making it the largest known concentration of mammals.

=== Modular organisms ===
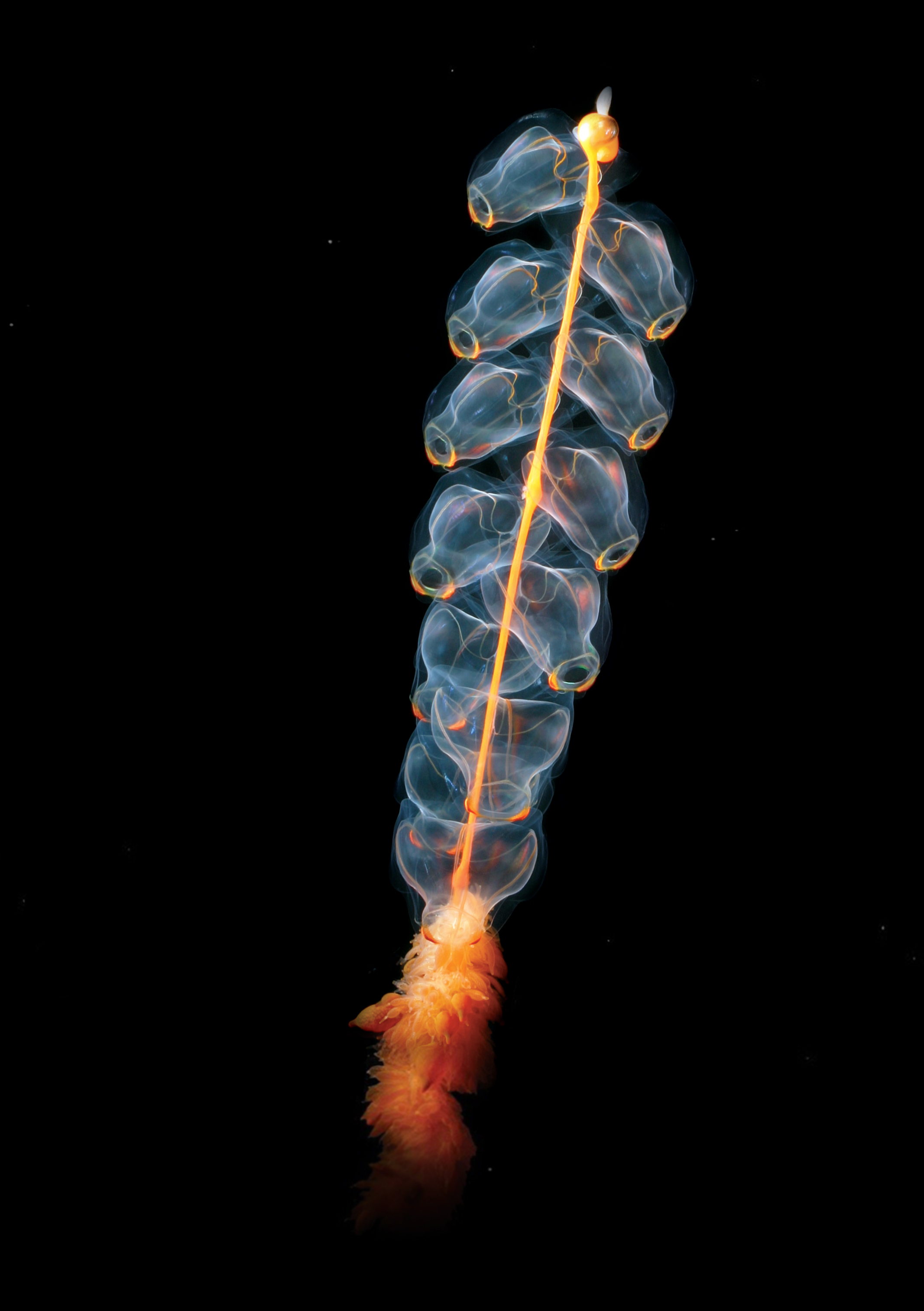
The pelagic Marrus orthocanna is a colonial siphonophore assembled from two types of zooids

Modular organisms are those in which a genet (or genetic individual formed from a sexually-produced zygote) asexually reproduces to form genetically identical clones called ramets.

==== Clonal colony ====
A clonal colony a group of ramets from one genet that live in close proximity or are physically connected. Ramets may have all of the functions needed to survive on their own or be interdependent on other ramets. For example, some sea anemones go through the process of pedal laceration in which a genetically identical individual is asexually produced from tissue broken off from the anemone's pedal disc. In plants, clonal colonies are created through the propagation of genetically identical individuals by stolons or rhizomes.

==== Colonial organisms ====
Colonial organisms are clonal colonies composed of many physically connected, interdependent individuals. The subunits of colonial organisms can be unicellular, as in the alga Volvox (a coenobium), or multicellular, as in the phylum Bryozoa. Colonial organisms may have been the first evolutionary step toward multicellular organisms. Individuals within a multicellular colonial organism may be called ramets, modules, or zooids. Structural and functional variation (polymorphism), when present, designates ramet responsibilities such as feeding, reproduction, and defense. To that end, being physically connected allows the colonial organism to distribute nutrients and energy obtained by feeding zooids throughout the colony. The hydrozoan Portuguese man o' war is a classic example of a colonial organism, one of many in the taxonomic class.

=== Microbial colonies ===
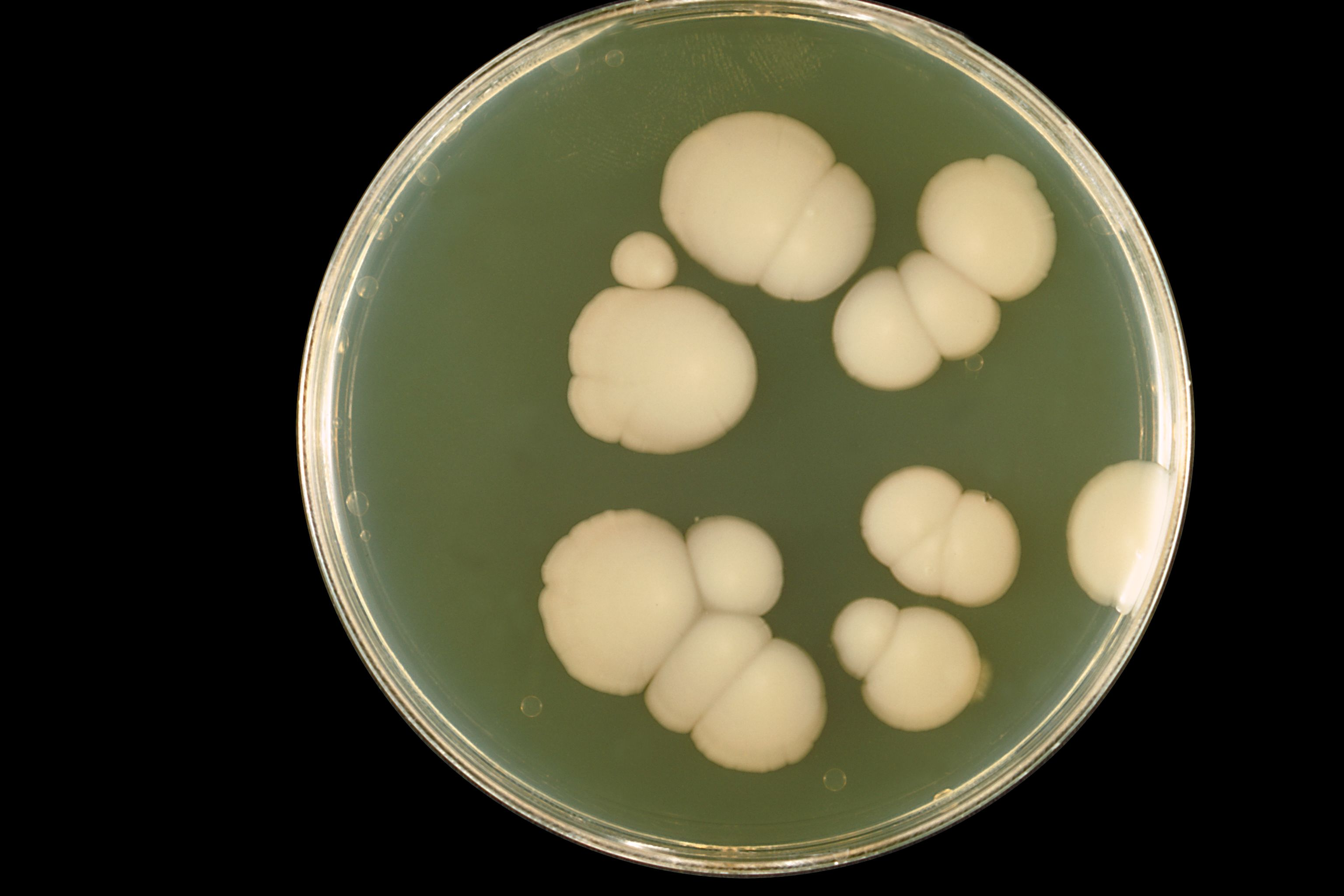
Clonal micro colonies of the fungus Candida albicans on an agar plate

A microbial colony is defined as a visible cluster of microorganisms growing on the surface of or within a solid medium, presumably cultured from a single cell. Because the colony is clonal, with all organisms in it descending from a single ancestor (assuming no contamination), they are genetically identical, except for any mutations (which occur at low frequencies). Obtaining such genetically identical organisms (or pure strains) can be useful; this is done by spreading organisms on a culture plate and starting a new stock from a single resulting colony.

A biofilm is a colony of microorganisms often comprising several species, with properties and capabilities greater than the aggregate of capabilities of the individual organisms.

== Ontogeny in eusocial insects ==
Colony ontogeny refers to the developmental process and progression of a colony. It describes the various stages and changes that occur within a colony from its initial formation to its mature state. The exact duration and dynamics of colony ontogeny can vary greatly depending on the species and environmental conditions. Factors such as resource availability, competition, and environmental cues can influence the progression and outcome of colony development.

During colony ontogeny for eusocial insects such as ants and bees, a colony goes through several distinct phases, each characterised by specific behavioural patterns, division of labor, and structural modifications. While the exact details can vary depending on the species, the general progression typically involves a number of well-defined stages, detailed below.

=== Founding stage ===
In this initial stage, a single female individual or small group of female individuals, often called the foundress(es), queen(s) (and kings for termites) or primary reproductive(s), establish a new colony. The foundresses build a basic nest structure and begin to lay eggs. The foundresses can also perform non-reproductive tasks at this early stage, such as nursing these first eggs and leaving the nest to gather resources.

=== Worker emergence ===
This is also known as the ergonomic stage. As the eggs laid by the foundresses develop, they give rise to the first generation of workers. These workers can assume various tasks, such as foraging, brood care, and nest maintenance. Initially, the worker population is relatively small, and their tasks are not as specialised. As the colony grows, more workers emerge, and the division of labor becomes more pronounced. Some individuals may specialise in tasks like foraging, defense, or tending to the brood, while others may take on general tasks within the nest. These specialised tasks can change throughout the life of a worker.

=== Reproductive phase ===
At a certain point in the colony ontogeny, usually after a period of growth and maturation, the colony produces reproductives, including new virgin queens (princesses) and males. These individuals have the potential to leave the nest and start new colonies, ensuring the transmission of the gene pool of its natal colony.

=== Colony death ===
Over time, colonies may go through a senescence phase where the reproductive output declines, and the colony's overall vitality diminishes. Eventually, the colony may die off or be replaced by a new generation of reproductives. After the death of the queen in a monogyne colony, possible fates other than colony death include serial polygyny (when a virgin queen of the colony replaces the dead queen as the primary reproductive) or colony inheritance (when a worker takes over as primary reproductive).

== Life history ==
Individuals in social colonies and modular organisms receive benefit to such a lifestyle. For example, it may be easier to seek out food, defend a nesting site, or increase competitive ability against other species. Modular organisms' ability to reproduce asexually in addition to sexually allows them unique benefits that social colonies do not have.

The energy required for sexual reproduction varies based on the frequency and length of reproductive activity, number and size of offspring, and parental care. While solitary individuals bear all of those energy costs, individuals in some social colonies share a portion of those costs.

Modular organisms save energy by using asexual reproduction during their life. Energy reserved in this way allows them to put more energy towards colony growth, regenerating lost modules (due to predation or other cause of death), or response to environmental conditions.

== See also ==
- Ant colony
- Bee colony
- Bird colony
- Clonal colony
- Coenocyte
- Colonisation (biology)
- Coral reef
- Eusociality
- Superorganism
- Swarm
- Birth colony
- Austroplatypus incompertus
