= Gastrozooid =

The gastrozooid, also called the trophozooid, is a specialized individual polyp found in colonial organisms, specifically Hydrozoans. This species is specifically responsible for capturing and digesting nutrients such as small marine animals and plankton and are equipped with a mouth and a digestive cavity to process captured food.
