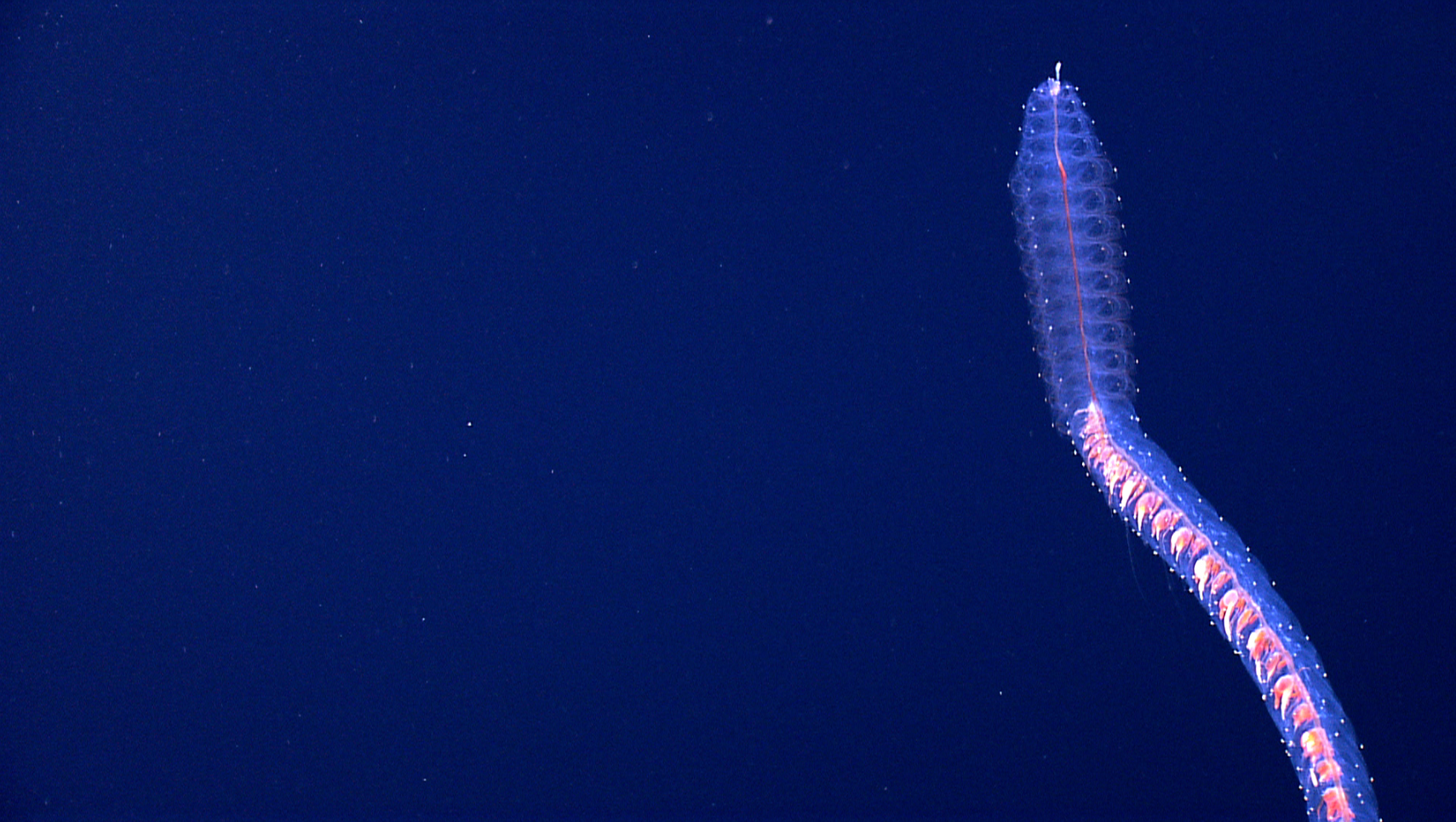
- A physonect siphonophore near Puerto Rico
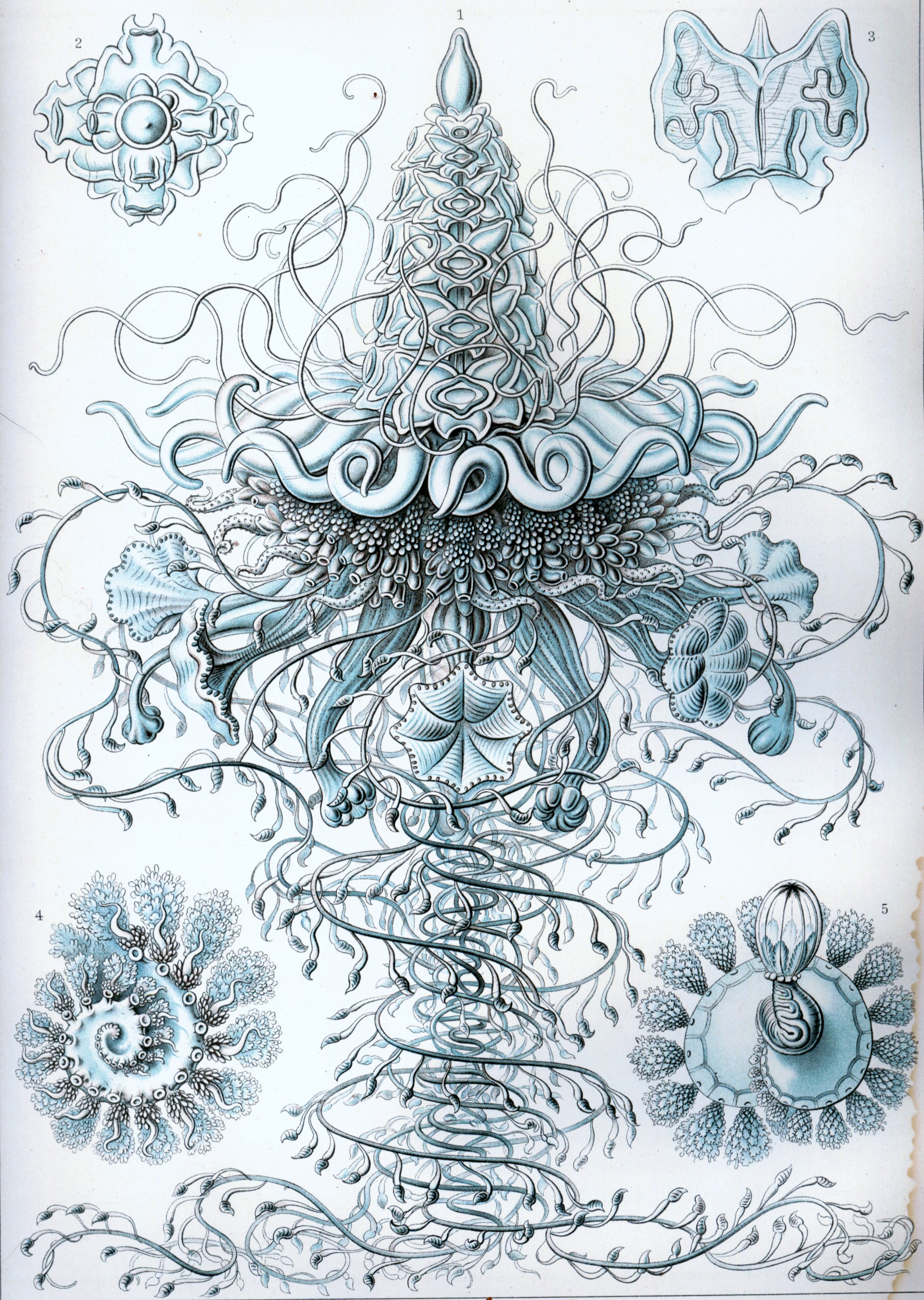
- Illustration of Physophora hydrostatica

Scientific classification
- Kingdom: Animalia
- Phylum: Cnidaria
- Class: Hydrozoa
- Order: Siphonophorae
- Suborder: Physonectae; Haeckel, 1888

Families
- Agalmatidae Brandt, 1834; Apolemiidae Huxley, 1859; Cordagalmatidae Pugh, 2016; Erennidae Pugh, 2001; Forskaliidae Haeckel, 1888; Physophoridae Eschscholtz, 1829; Pyrostephidae Moser, 1925; Resomiidae Pugh, 2006; Rhodaliidae Haeckel, 1888; Stephanomiidae Huxley, 1859; Paraphyletically excluded but cladistically included: Calycophorae

= Physonectae =

Suborder of siphonophores

Physonectae is a suborder of siphonophores. Organisms in the suborder Physonectae follow the classic Siphonophore body plan. They are almost all pelagic, and are composed of a colony of specialized zooids that originate from the same fertilized egg.

== Distribution ==
The majority of physonect siphonophores are pelagic, with the exception of Rhodallidae, which are a family of benthic physonects first collected during the Challenger expedition and described by Ernst Haekel in his Challenger monograph.

Physonects, and siphonophores in general, are known to be widely distributed globally, but are understudied. Few individuals have been collected and are often misidentified. As a result, their exact global distributions are unclear.

== Morphology ==
All physonect siphonophores have an aboral, apical pneumatophore filled with gas, which is formed by invagination of the superficial cell layers of the apical side of the larva. In some species in the suborder Physonectae, the pneumatophore has a pore located either on the apical or basal pole of the organism and plays a role in controlling gas volume and pressure for buoyancy control. Gas in the pneumatophore is high in carbon monoxide and is secreted by the pneumadenia, or gas gland.

Below the pneumatophore, an organism has a long stem with two distinct regions. The nectosome is more apical relative to the siphosome and is composed of asexual nectophores, or swimming bells. These swimming bells are the animal's zooids specialized for swimming. The siphophore includes the gastrozooids (feeding polyps) and sexual medusoids.

== Reproduction ==
Each physonect colony is composed of individual organisms originating from the same fertilized egg, with specialized functions including locomotion, feeding, and reproduction. The ventral budding zone of the nectophores in the animal lies immediately below pneumatophore. As new buds are produced asexually, the swimming bells are displaced downwards.

Sexual reproduction occurs to give rise to a new colony of zooids. The siphosome is made up of groups called cormidia, which consist of a gastrozooid with a tentacle, bracts and palpons, and the gonodentra. The gonodendra bears the gonophores, or sexual bodies. Among physonect Siphonophores, many are monoecious, some are protandrous, and few are dioecious. Eggs and sperm are deposited directly into the water and fertilization happens externally.

== Life stages ==
While the life cycle of physonects has been studied in a limited number of species, in a typical physonect life cycle, external fertilization happens between eggs and sperm released by free-swimming eudoxids, which are released into the water from mature physonects. Like all siphonophores, physonect eggs are yolky, and act as the source of energy for their early development. The sperm are attracted to the egg by species-specific chemicals. A planula forms, which then develops into a bilaterally symmetric siphonula, then mature into a young colony, and eventually into a mature colony. Most physonectae are pelagic for their entire life cycles.

== Diet ==
Physonectae are carnivorous predators and vary in diet depending on the local availability of prey. In a study on the diets epipelagic siphonophores in the Gulf of California in the Sargasso Sea and in Friday Harbor, Washington, it was found that compared to other suborders of Siphonophores, species in the suborder Physonectae have fewer, large gastrozooids. They primarily consume large copepods, some smaller copepods, and a variety of other large, non-copepod prey. Gastrozooid length appears to correlate to preferred and maximum size of prey. In Canadian Pacific waters, physonect diets similarly included larger copepods, but also larger arthropods, chaetognaths, and fish larvae.
