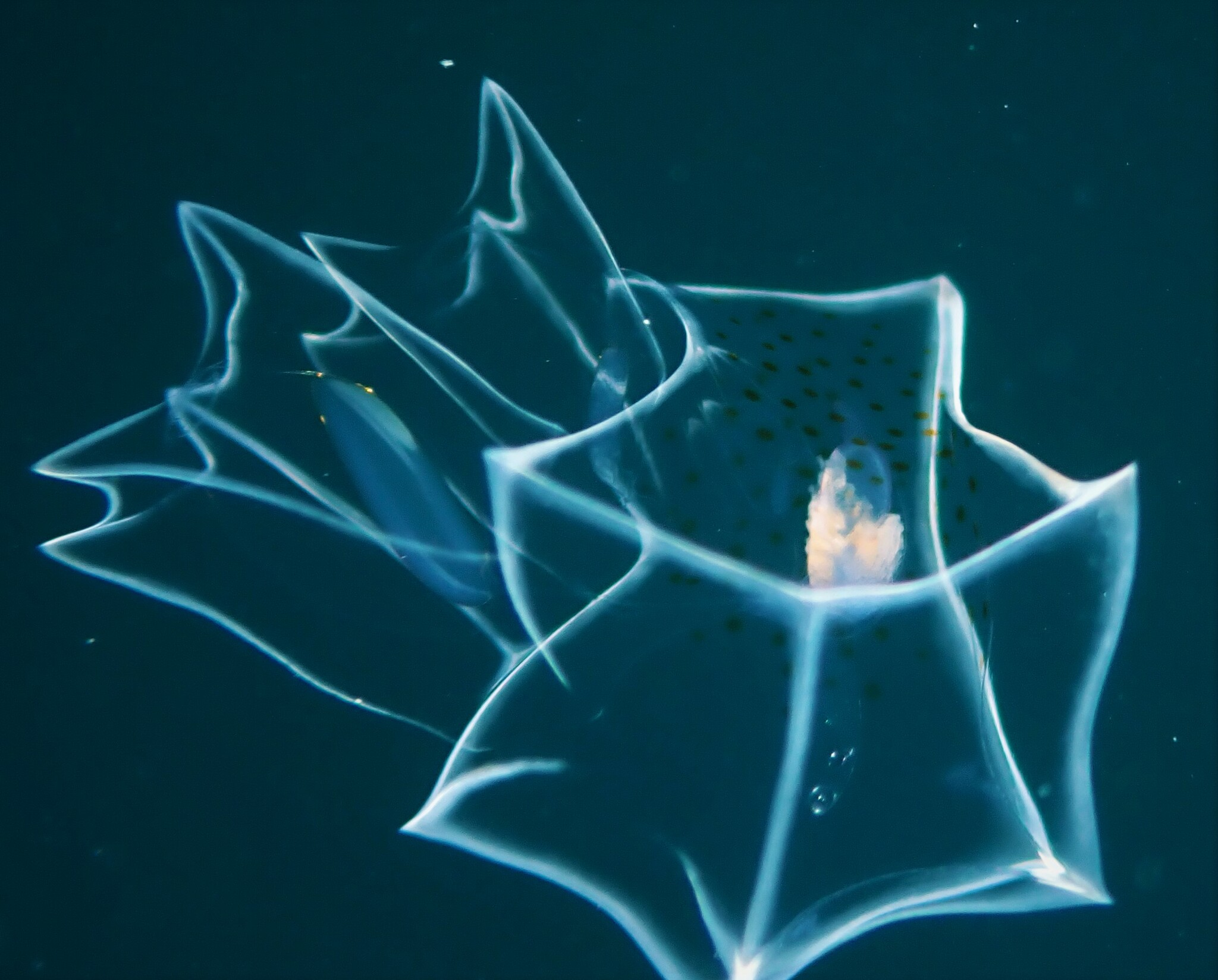

Scientific classification
- Kingdom: Animalia
- Phylum: Cnidaria
- Class: Hydrozoa
- Order: Siphonophorae
- Family: Abylidae
- Genus: Bassia; L. Agassiz, 1862
- Species: B. bassensis

Binomial name
- Bassia bassensis (Quoy & Gaimard, 1833)

Synonyms
- Genus synonymy: Sphenoides Huxley, 1859; Species synonymy: Abyla bassensis Huxley, 1859; Abyla pentagona Mayer, 1900; Abyla perforata Gegenbaur, 1859; Bassia obeliscus Haeckel, 1888a; Bassia quadrilatera Haeckel, 1888b; Bassia tetragona Haeckel, 1888b; Calpe bassensis Lesson, 1843; Diphyes bassensis Quoy & Gaimard, 1833; Sphenoides australis Huxley, 1859; Sphenoides obeliscus Haeckel, 1888a; Sphenoides perforata Haeckel, 1888a

= Bassia bassensis =

Species of cnidarian

Bassia is a monotypic siphonophore genus in the family Abylidae. The genus contains the single species Bassia bassensis.

== Description ==
The species reaches body lengths of 6–8 cm. The body plan is radially symmetric around a central mouth, with a polyhedral shape bearing 4 main ridges which end in short basal teeth. The species is bioluminescent and has a bluish tint on the ridges of the nectophores and is covered in gelatinous sheets that form a "box" around the mouth. As in all cnidarians, there is a single gastrovascular cavity (the coelenteron) and the mouth acts as both mouth and anus; it is surrounded by a layer of tentacles bearing nematocysts.

== Distribution ==
Bassia bassensis is common in warmer and tropical waters in the Atlantic and Pacific oceans, specifically around the African and Asian coasts. It is common in the Humboldt Current system, along with other gelatinous zooplankton off the coast of South America, where three currents mix together. The species is generally found in the top 50 meters of the epipelagic zone of the ocean.

== Ecology ==
The species primarily preys on copepods in the 0.4-1.2 mm size range.

Populations can be among the most abundant species of siphonophores. Abundance may be impacted by small variations in salinity and temperature, leading to great increases at temperatures below 28 degrees Celsius, and dwindling in temperatures greater than 28.5 degrees. Enough food availability in the concerned areas might mitigate the negative effect of low or high salinity waters, given the positive and significant relationship between siphonophore WDV and zooplankton wet weight biomass.
