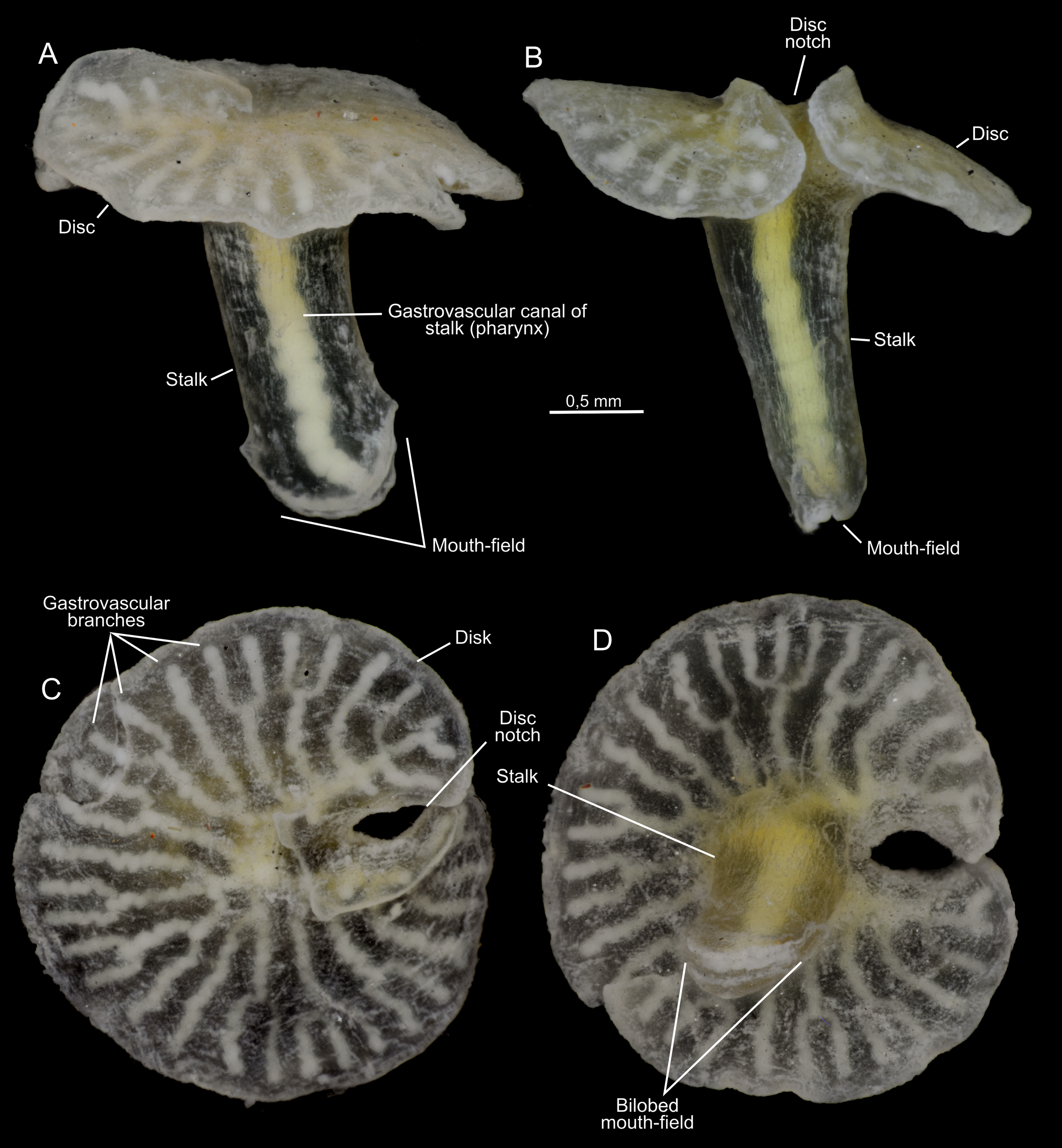
- Dendrogramma enigmatica

Scientific classification
- Kingdom: Animalia
- Phylum: Cnidaria
- Class: Hydrozoa
- Order: Siphonophorae
- Family: Rhodaliidae
- Genus: Dendrogramma; Just, Kristensen, & Olesen, 2014

Type species
- Dendrogramma enigmatica Just, Kristensen, & Olesen, 2014

Species
- D. enigmatica Just, Kristensen, & Olesen, 2014 (=D. discoides)

= Dendrogramma =

Genus of animals belonging to cnidarians and described in 2014

Dendrogramma enigmatica is a species of siphonophore, the only one in its genus. It has been first described in 2014 on the basis of its morphology from a collection of specimens gathered in 1986. Its taxonomic affinity among animals was then unclear, but RNA from new specimens in 2016 allowed it to be identified as a siphonophore by barcoding and phylogenomics. The specimens are presumed to represent parts (bracts) of an entire siphonophore that has not been identified yet.

== Discovery ==
The first Dendrogramma specimens were collected off the south-east coast of Australia during a scientific expedition in 1986. They were collected at water depths of 400 metres (1,300 ft) and 1,000 metres (3,300 ft) on the continental slope near Tasmania, using a sled that was dragged over the sea floor to collect bottom-dwelling animals. The researchers were immediately struck by the unusual characteristics of the 18 specimens they collected. These were preserved in formaldehyde, and later in ethanol, for further study.

On returning to the sample site in 1988, the researchers were unable to find any further specimens. It was not until 2014 that they published the discovery. Jean Just of the University of Copenhagen, who carried out the trawling in 1986, has explained the long delay before publication in terms of the extraordinary nature of the discovery: "Once you think you have something really extraordinary, it takes a long time to study, read, consult left, right and centre, and convince yourself that you've really stumbled across something special."

When initially discovered, Dendrogramma's relationships were unclear. The two purported species were assigned their own genus, Dendrogramma, and family, Dendrogrammatidae; and the researchers even considered putting them in their own phylum. As they put it, however, "we refrain from erecting such a high-level taxon for the time being, because new material is needed to resolve many pertinent outstanding questions." The lead scientist of the identification effort, Jørgen Olesen of the University of Copenhagen, suggested that they represent "an early branch on the tree of life, with similarities to the 600 million-year-old extinct Ediacara fauna." At least three genera of Ediacarans—Albumares, Anfesta, and Rugoconites—share similarities with Dendrogramma; all three appear to have possessed a disc with an internal network of forking channels. This possibility generated considerable excitement: Simon Conway Morris of the University of Cambridge stated that the discovery is "a very interesting surprise, and it poses lots and lots of questions." He noted the "most intriguing similarity to certain Ediacaran forms," but cautioned that "the similarities are exactly that. They are intriguing rather than compelling." Genetic identification was not possible with the original specimens as they were preserved with formaldehyde and alcohol, a method that does not preserve nucleic acids suitably for most analyses.

Consequently, in 2015, the International Institute for Species Exploration named it as one of the "Top 10 New Species" for new species discovered in 2014.

In late 2015, an expedition aboard the RV Investigator rediscovered the organism and collected 85 specimens in a manner that allowed genetic analysis, putting an end to the prior speculation.

== Naming ==
The genus name Dendrogramma derives from the two ancient greek words δένδρον (déndron), meaning "tree", and γράμμα (grámma), meaning "drawing, mathematical figure". It alludes to the branching pattern of the digestive canals, which resemble dendrograms, i.e., branching diagrams frequently used by biologists to illustrate the evolutionary relationships among organisms.

The specific name enigmatica of the type species refers to the mysterious nature of the organisms, while discoides — the species epithet of the purported second species — alluded to the disc-like shape of the animals.

== Description ==
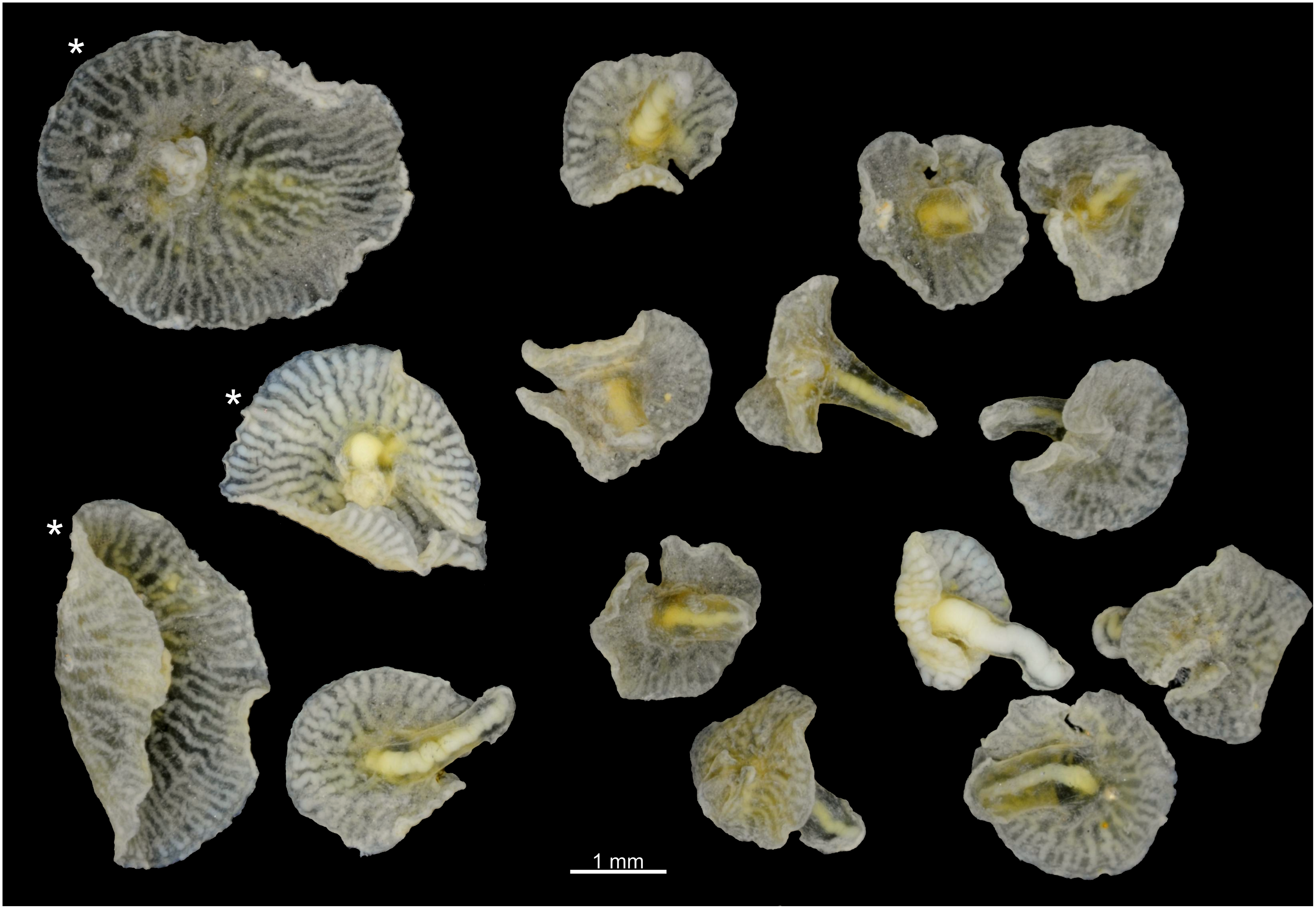
Preserved specimens of Dendrogramma.

The specimens first collected were roughly mushroom-shaped, and with a mostly asymmetrical structure. So far, no sex organs or nervous system have been detected. The specimens consist of a flattened, somewhat circular disc and a stalk with what was originally interpreted as mouth on the end, surrounded by lobes. The "mouth" on the end of the stalk leads to what was presumed to be a digestive canal that forks repeatedly when it reaches the disc. The individuals have an outer skin, with what was taken to be a stomach separated from the skin by a layer of dense gelatinous material (mesoglea). The stalks measure up to 8 millimeters in length, while the disc ranges from 11 to 17 mm in diameter, although the original specimens experienced significant shrinkage in full-strength ethanol after measurements were made.

There were originally thought to be two species, primarily differing in shape of the disc and proportional length of the stalk: D. discoides has a complete disc and proportionally shorter stalk (length about 10% of the disc diameter) while D. enigmatica has a notched disc and proportionally longer stalk (up to 70% of disc diameter). The species were later shown to represent varieties of a single species.

Although they are now interpreted as detached bracts (parts) of the entire siphonophore (which remains unidentified), the specimens were first interpreted as free-living organisms, as they did not appear to show evidence of having been attached to something else, whether a surface or each other.

== Relationships ==
Dendrogramma has a body plan similar to animals in the phyla Cnidaria and Ctenophora, but the observed specimens lack the stinging cells that define cnidarians and the tentacles that define ctenophorans. DNA barcoding based on mitochondrial (COXI and 16S rRNA) and nuclear ribosomal (18S rRNA and 28S rRNA) markers, combined to molecular phylogenetics based on sequences from 155 nuclear genes extracted from the transcriptome, indicate a relationship with the Rhodaliidae siphonophores. More specifically, Dendrogramma appears closely related to members of the families Agalmatidae (Agalma), Abylidae (Abylopsis), and Prayidae (Craseoa).
