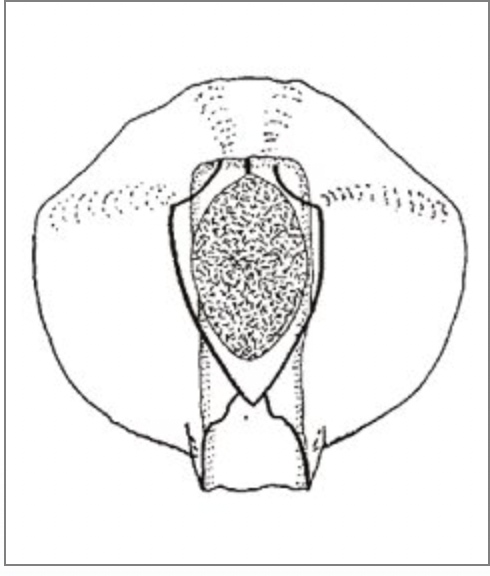
- Anatomy based on Moser 1925

Scientific classification
- Kingdom: Animalia
- Phylum: Cnidaria
- Class: Hydrozoa
- Order: Siphonophorae
- Family: Abylidae
- Genus: Abyla
- Species: A. bicarinata

Binomial name
- Abyla bicarinata Moser, 1925

Synonyms
- Abyla brownia Sears, 1953; Abyla tottoni Sears, 1953

= Abyla bicarinata =

Species of cnidarian

Abyla bicarinata is a colonial siphonophore in the family Abylidae. It was first described in 1925 by Fanny Moser.

== Description ==
A wide anterior nectophore with side ridges creates a wing like appearance and providing wing functions. They are also have rounded edges of facets. There is no transverse ridge between the ventral and apico-ventral facets. On the posterior side the nectophore is both the same width and length reinforcing the round and wing shape. They have combs that contain between 4 and 7 strong ostial teeth.

== Distribution ==
The species has been found off the southeast coast of Hawaii at depths below 1000 m during the summer months. It was also spotted off the coast of California at 200 m. Individuals were found in the South China Sea during winter. There are also records from off the coast of California and Hawaii in the upper 200 m of the water column, rarely below 1000 m.
