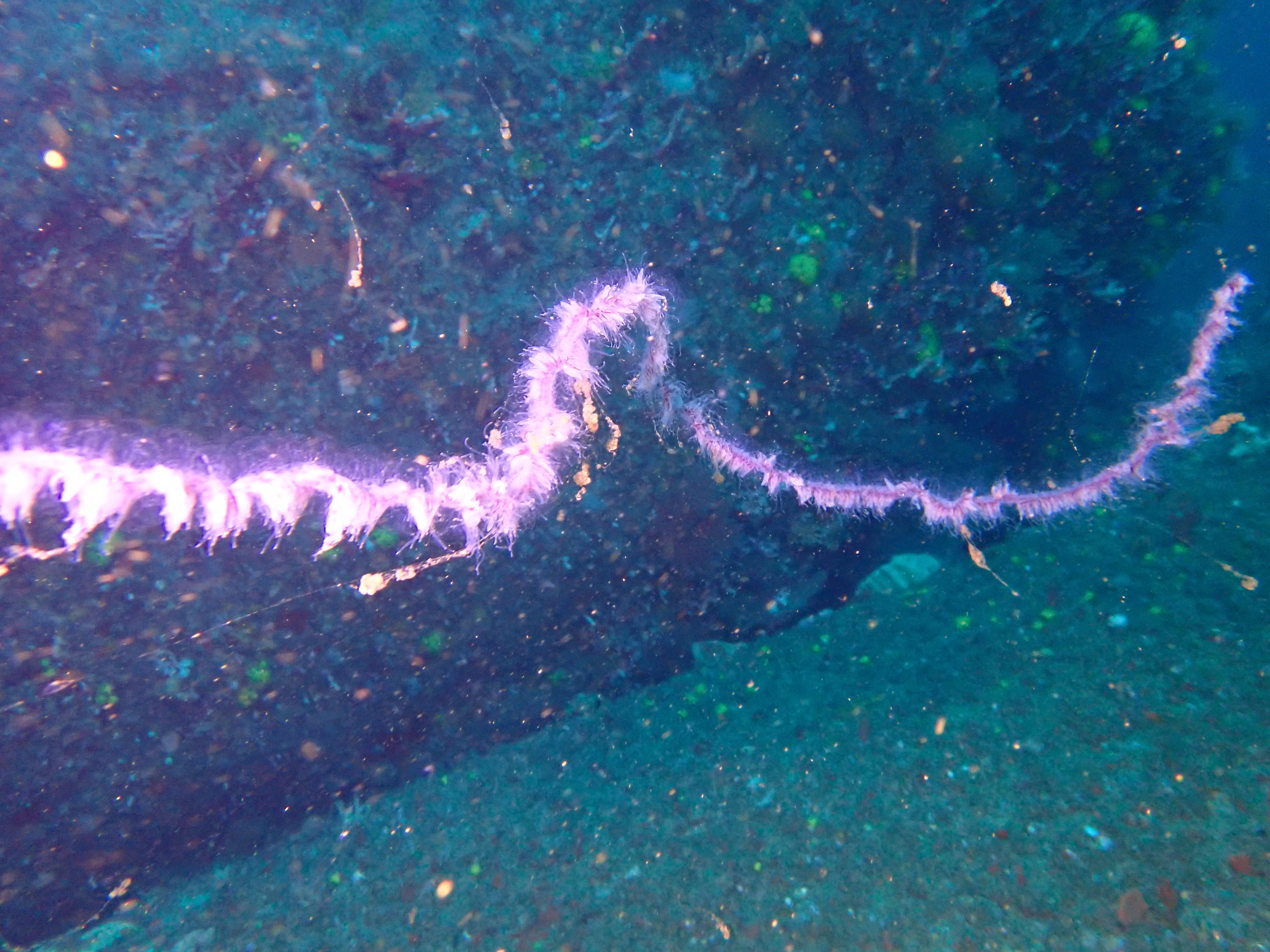

Scientific classification
- Kingdom: Animalia
- Phylum: Cnidaria
- Class: Hydrozoa
- Order: Siphonophorae
- Family: Abylidae
- Genus: Abylopsis
- Species: A. tetragona

Binomial name
- Abylopsis tetragona (Otto, 1823)

= Abylopsis tetragona =

Species of cnidarian

Abylopsis tetragona is a species of siphonophore in the family Abylidae.

== Description / Behavior ==
Abylopsis tetragona is a species of siphonophore in the family Abylidae. Abylopsis tetragona is a colonial organism, which is primarily gelatinous and measures about 1 cm. This species has an anterior nectophore as well as a posterior nectophore that is three times as wide. Both facets are less regularly pentagonal. A. tetragona has radial symmetry and has two basal teeth. This species has an exoskeleton of chitin and are almost entirely marine. The A. tetragona has two body forms; a polyp and a medusa. All hydrozoans have many cells that can form into two tissue types: epidermis and gastrodermis. Abylopsis tetragona's common name is siphonophore and can be defined as eurythermal and euryhaline, meaning that they can endure a wide range of temperatures and salinities. Siphonophores, at first sight, can be thought to be a long mega-animal, as seen in the picture to the right. But looking at it more closely, this mega-organism is made up of individual organisms called zooids (attached polyps medusae). Each zooid has a different role within the colony. Abylopsis tetragona lacks pneumatophores (which aid buoyancy), and has a nectophore. This means that A. tetragona uses its swimming bells to help with the locomotion of the colony. Siphonophores can form bioluminescent structures, enabling them to lure their prey and provide some defense mechanism against their predators. This species attaches itself to shells, seaweed, and other surfaces at the bottom of the ocean.

== Distribution ==
Abylopsis tetragona can be found at depths between 0 and 200m deep from the tropical to temperate oceans. This species is abundant in the Atlantic, Pacific, and Indian Ocean, as well as the Mediterranean Sea. In the Atlantic Ocean and the Mediterranean sea, the Abylopsis tetragona is mainly found between the depths of 50 and 200m. This species lives in both coastal and open waters, and can be found at depths of 100m at night through vertical migration.

== Diet ==
There are no studies on the species specifically. However, calycophoran siphonophores feed on plankton. They are known as voracious predators who primarily feed on fish larvae and herbivorous plankton. This species show selectivity in its eating habits. They digest their food in their simple gastrovascular cavity, which is lined with flagellated cells. These cells help circulate the food in the cavity.

== Life stages ==
This species was only recorded in the medusoid stage. However, more generally, calycophorae siphonophorae, the family of the Abylopsis tetragona, start their life cycle as an egg that forms into protozoid. Then, the protozoid buds with other zooids and grows into a mature colony. After, the members of the colony liberate eggs and sperm, and this starts the cycle again.

== Movement ==
Abylopsis tetragona is known as ocean drifters, which means that they are unable to move on their own. This species also uses vertical migration to allow them to stay away from predators and feed. They go up to depths of 100m at night, while in the day, they can go down to depths of 200m. The gelatinous carnivores increased in the water column due to waters warming. They travel the depths of the waters by means of a gas-filled tissue.

== Reproduction ==
The main breeding period of this species is during the spring (April to June), despite their constant presence in the waters all year round. They reproduce asexually through a budding process, creating daughter polyps. This organism has minimal parental investment. The sperm and eggs that are released in the water are left to survive without parental assistance.
