= Angelopsis =

Scientific classification
- Domain: Eukaryota
- Kingdom: Animalia
- Phylum: Cnidaria
- Class: Hydrozoa
- Order: Siphonophorae
- Family: Rhodaliidae
- Genus: Angelopsis; Fewkes, 1886

Genus of cnidarians

Angelopsis is a genus of hydrozoans belonging to the family Rhodaliidae.

The species of this genus are found in Northern America.

Species:

- Angelopsis euryale Pugh, 1983
- Angelopsis globosa Fewkes, 1886
