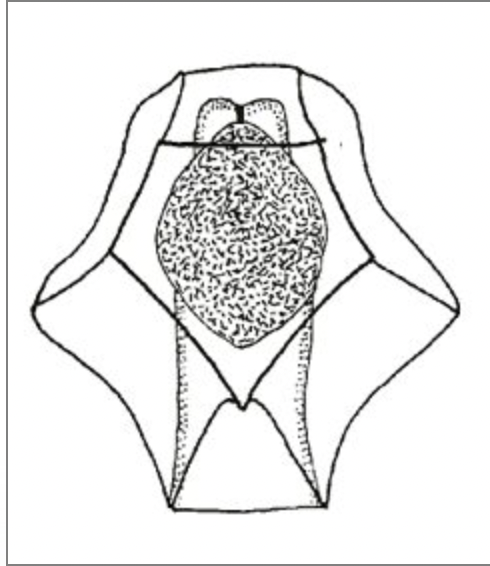
- Anatomy based on Lens and van Riemsdijk 1908

Scientific classification
- Kingdom: Animalia
- Phylum: Cnidaria
- Class: Hydrozoa
- Order: Siphonophorae
- Family: Abylidae
- Genus: Abyla
- Species: A. haeckeli

Binomial name
- Abyla haeckeli Lens & van Riemsdijk, 1908

Synonyms
- Abyla ingeborgae Sears, 1953; Amphiroa dispar Bedot, 1896

= Abyla haeckeli =

Species of cnidarian

Abyla haeckeli is a colonial siphonophore in the family Abylidae. It was described in 1908.

== Description ==
The species has an anterior nectophore that is the same width and length but it does not provide wing functions. A transverse ridge separates the ventral facet from the apico-ventral facet. The posterior nectophore can have up to 5 teeth on one comb. It also has lateral ostial teeth that are closer to the dorsal tooth rather than the ventral teeth.

== Distribution ==
The species has been reported near the Philippines and Japan in the upper parts of the water column.
