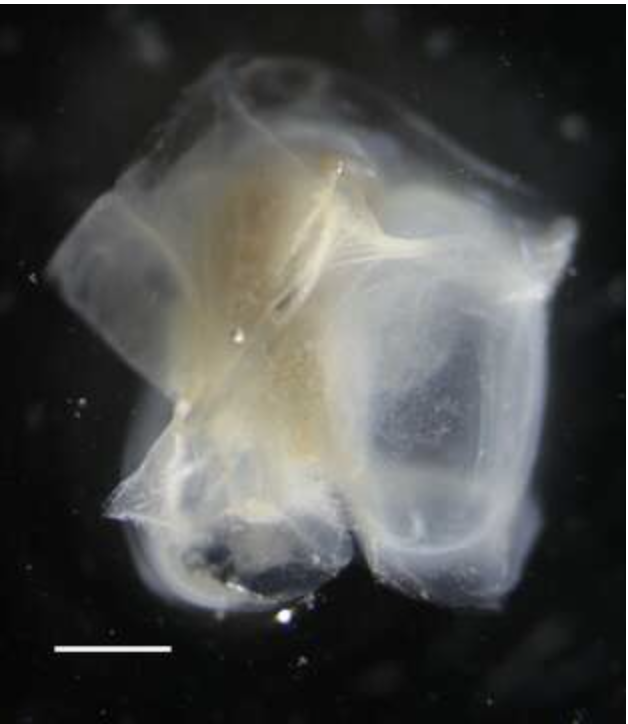
- Abyla haeckeli

Scientific classification
- Kingdom: Animalia
- Phylum: Cnidaria
- Class: Hydrozoa
- Order: Siphonophorae
- Family: Abylidae
- Genus: Abyla; Quoy & Gaimard, 1827

Type species
- Abyla trigona Quoy & Gaimard, 1827

Species
- A. bicarinata Moser, 1925; A. haeckeli Lens & van Riemsdijk, 1908; A. trigona Quoy & Gaimard, 1827

= Abyla (cnidarian) =

Genus of cnidarians

Abyla is a genus of colonial siphonophore in the subfamily Abylinae and the suborder Calycophorae. The genus contains three species and was established by Quoy and Gaimard in 1827.

== Taxonomy ==
Three species are currently recognized:

- A. bicarinata Moser, 1925
- A. haeckeli Lens & van Riemsdijk, 1908
- A. trigona Quoy & Gaimard, 1827

A number of former species in the genus have since been synonymized to these three species.

== Distribution and habitat ==
All species in the genus are strictly marine, inhabiting mostly the pelagic zone. They are mainly found in tropico-equatorial and subtropic regions.
