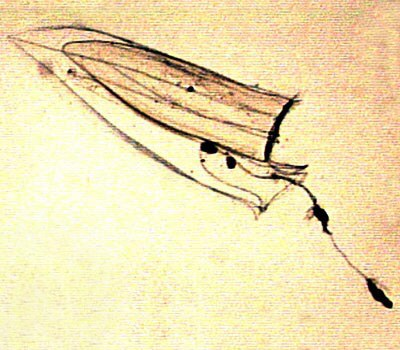
- Morphology of a Calycophorae with aligned nectophores (Muggiaea atlantica)

Scientific classification
- Kingdom: Animalia
- Phylum: Cnidaria
- Class: Hydrozoa
- Order: Siphonophorae
- Suborder: Calycophorae; Leuckart, 1854

Families
- Abylidae L. Agassiz, 1862; Clausophyidae Totton, 1965; Diphyidae Quoy & Gaimard, 1827; Hippopodiidae Kölliker, 1853; Prayidae Kölliker, 1853; Sphaeronectidae Huxley, 1859; Tottonophyidae Pugh, Dunn & Haddock, 2018

= Calycophorae =

Suborder of Siphonophorae

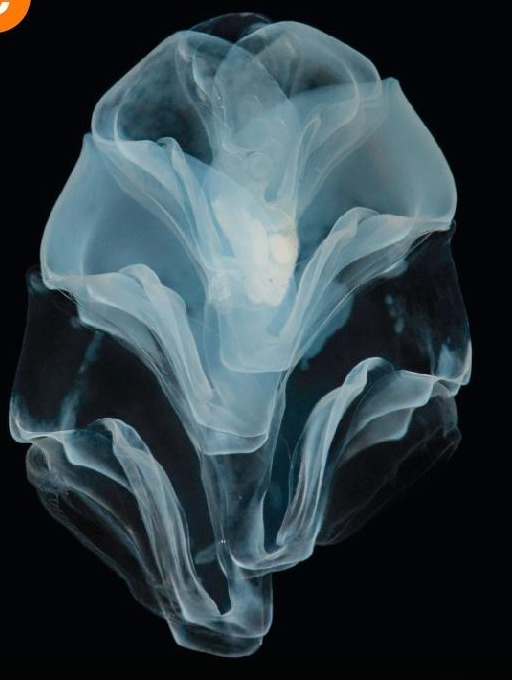
Hippopodius hippopus with several nectophores.

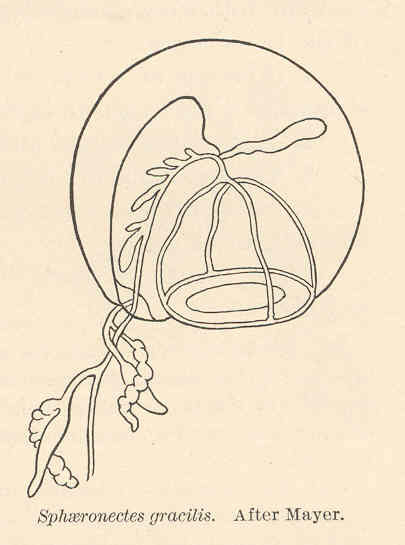
A typical sphaeronectidae with one nectophore (Spheronectes gracilis)

Calycophorae is a suborder of Siphonophores alongside two other suborders Physonectae and Cystonectae. This suborder includes the giant siphonophore (Praya dubia), one of the longest lengthwise extant creatures (40–50m). While the Physonectae have a pneumatophore (a float), nectophore (or nectosome), and a siphosome, Cystonectae lack a nectophore, and Calycophorae lack a pneumatophore. From the bell-shaped nectophores, Physonectae and Calycophorae are called Codonophores or Greek for bell-bearers. The distribution, morphology, and behaviors of Calycophorae species are vast and greatly depend on the species. Calycophoraes typically consist of two nectophores with a siphosome that have many tentacles that grow out of the siphosome. The Calycophoraes move by propelling water out of the nectophore much like how jellyfishes move. The tentacles act as fishing nets where the nematocysts on the tentacles paralyze their prey which are then later fed on. Calycophorae have three life stages, which are the larval development stage, the polygastric stage, and the eudoxid maturation stage. Each Calycophorae colony forms from one fertilized egg.

== Distribution ==
Calycophorae are found generally in every deep sea pelagic environments. The location and depth of distribution depends on the species of Calycophorae. The species Muggiaea bargmannae belongs to the family Diphyidae which have been found at depths between 400 and 2000 meters at both poles at a latitude between 36~87°N and 43~71°S. The species Hippopodius hippopus of the family Hippopodiidae on the other hand, have been observed to live at a depth between 0 and 300 meters at the latitudes 50°N~38°S.

== Morphology ==
All Siphonophores including Calycophorae are composed of zooids, which each have a function within the organism including but not limited to feeding, reproduction, and locomotion. The body plan of a Calycophorae can be divided into its nectophore and its siphosome. A typical Calycophorae has two nectophores that have ostia that are either facing the opposite or same directions. For aligned nectophores, the nectophores are classified as anterior and posterior with the latter being the one behind. Within the nectophore are the somatocyst and the hydroecium. The somatocyst is an additional structure that is seen in the mesoglea of Calycophorans where oil globules are stored as a food source and also serve to provide buoyancy. The hydroecium is a ventral cavity that exists in the posterior nectophore. The siphosome is the stem of the Calycophoran on which the bracts, gastrozooids, and gonophores are attached to with the bracts serving as a protective cover. The bracts also contain a phyllocyst that also contains oil globules. Each group of these zooids is called a cormidium and repeats itself throughout the siphosome. Each gastrozooid has an elongated tentacle that has several side tentacles called tentilla that have pads or batteries of nematocysts which are connected to the tentacle by a pedicel. There are some exceptions to this common morphology such as the Hippopodiids that have several overlapping nectophores and Sphaeronectids that have one nectophore.

== Locomotion ==
The nectophores contract to push water out of the ostium and propels the organism forward. In some Calycophorans, the siphosome can be retracted into the hydroecium to reduce drag. Some Calycophorans have replaced up to 75% of heavy sulfate ions in their bracts with lighter chloride ions to increase their buoyancy to compensate for their lack of pneumatophores.

== Feeding ==
All Siphonophores are predatory carnivores including the Calycophorans. The nematocysts on the tentilla inject toxins into prey that come in contact with the nematocysts. The toxins paralyze the prey immobilizing it, which is then brought to the gastrozooid for digestion and redistribution of nutrients. The prey of Calycophorans depend on the species but are commonly small crustaceans such as copepods, gelatinous zooplankton, or even small fish.

== Reproduction ==
The Calycophorae are monoecious and have three stages in their life cycle which are the larval development stage, the polygastric stage (maturity stage), and the eudoxid stage (sexual reproduction stage). The bracts which contain gastrozooids and gonophores on a Calycophorae detach from the siphosome once maturity is reached. This detached bract becomes a free living eudoxid that releases male or female gametes depending on its determined sex. A successfully fertilized gamete enters the larval development stage in which asexual reproduction takes over to recreate a full polygastric colony.

== Taxonomy ==
From molecular phylogenetics it has been confirmed that Calycophorae evolved from the Physonectae. 175 species of Siphonophores have been identified of which 5 are of Cystonectae (which includes the Portuguese man o' war) and the rest are of Codonophora. There are 16 families under Codonophora and 7 families under Calycophorae: Prayidae, Hippopodiidae, Clausophyidae, Sphaeronectidae, Diphyidae, Abylidae, and Tottonophyidae.

== Other relevant information ==
=== Current debates ===
The differences in the structure and function of zooids are often studied to determine the different species of Siphonophores, and the loss or addition of zooids usually signify speciation. Current debates contemplate whether or not the Siphonophores including Calycophorans as a whole are losing or gaining zooid types.

=== Specimen collection ===
Siphonophores in general are fragile and using nets would shred the organism into pieces. For descriptive analysis, specimens need to be carefully collected by research submersibles into capsules which takes much more time and effort. These complications are a setback to the study of Calycophorans. However, some locations such as the bay at Villefranche-Sur-Mer, have special abiotic conditions that push up Siphonophores to the shore. These specimens are readily collectible and have contributed to much of our knowledge of Siphonophores.
