= Moseria =

Moseria may refer to:

- Moseria, a genus of beetles in the family Chrysomelidae, synonym of Burumoseria
- Moseria, a genus of cnidarians in the family Resomiidae, synonym of Resomia
- Moseria, a genus of fossil mites in the family Tarsonemidae, synonym of Iponemus
