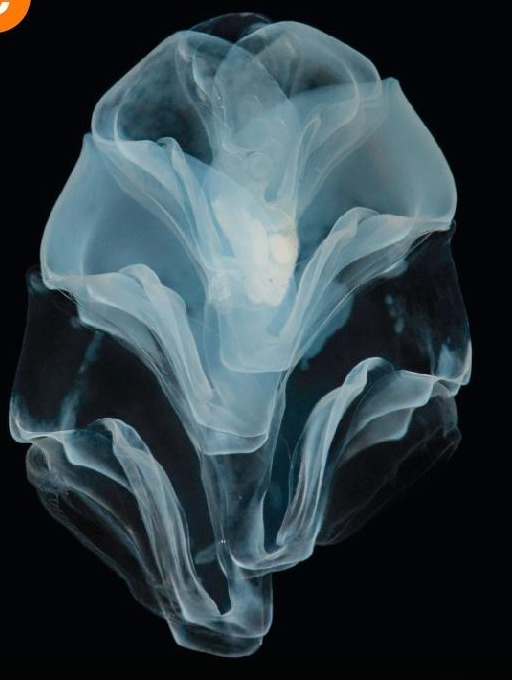
- Hippopodius hippopus

Scientific classification
- Domain: Eukaryota
- Kingdom: Animalia
- Phylum: Cnidaria
- Class: Hydrozoa
- Order: Siphonophorae
- Family: Hippopodiidae
- Genus: Hippopodius; Quoy & Gaimard, 1827

Synonyms
- Elephantopes Lesson, 1843; Hippopus delle Chiaje, 1841; Polyphyes Haeckel, 1888; Protomedea de Blainville

= Hippopodius =

Genus of cnidarians

Hippopodius is a genus of cnidarians belonging to the family Hippopodiidae.

The genus has cosmopolitan distribution.

This genus now contains only a single species, Hippopodius hippopus, although historically it contained more:

- Hippopodius cuspitatus Moser, 1925 accepted as Nectopyramis natans (Bigelow, 1911)
- Hippopodius glabrus (Bigelow, 1918) accepted as Vogtia glabra Bigelow, 1918
- Hippopodius gleba Leuckart, 1854 accepted as Hippopodius hippopus (Forsskål, 1776)
- Hippopodius luteus Quoy & Gaimard, 1827 accepted as Hippopodius hippopus (Forsskål, 1776)
- Hippopodius mediterraneus Costa, 1836 accepted as Hippopodius hippopus (Forsskål, 1776)
- Hippopodius neapolitanus Kölliker, 1853 accepted as Hippopodius hippopus (Forsskål, 1776)
- Hippopodius pentacanthus (Kölliker, 1853) accepted as Vogtia pentacantha Kölliker, 1853
- Hippopodius serratus Moser, 1915 accepted as Vogtia serrata (Moser, 1915)
- Hippopodius spinosus (Keferstein & Ehlers, 1861) accepted as Vogtia spinosa Keferstein & Ehlers, 1861
- Hippopodius ungulatus (Haeckel, 1888) accepted as Hippopodius hippopus (Forsskål, 1776)
