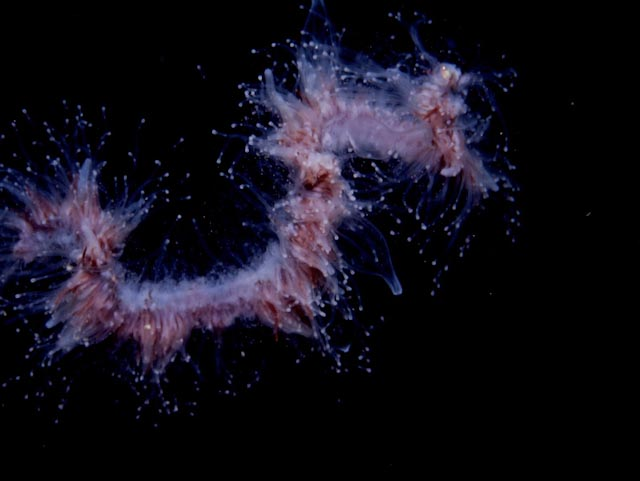
- Apolemia uvaria

Scientific classification
- Kingdom: Animalia
- Phylum: Cnidaria
- Class: Hydrozoa
- Order: Siphonophorae
- Suborder: Physonectae
- Family: Apolemiidae; Huxley, 1859
- Genus: Apolemia; Eschscholtz, 1829

Species
- See text

Synonyms
- Ramosia Stepanjants, 1967; Tottonia Margulis, 1976

= Apolemia =

Family of cnidarians

Apolemia is a genus of siphonophores. It is the only genus in the monotypic family Apolemiidae.

Like other siphonophores, Apolemia members may resemble an individual organism, but they are instead colonial, consisting of many polyp and medusoid components collectively known as zooids.

== Research ==
The genus Apolemia was named by Baltic-German physician and naturalist Johann Friedrich von Eschscholtz. In 1815, Apolemia uvaria (the "string jellyfish") was discovered and described by French naturalist Charles Alexandre Lesueur off the coast of Europe. It displayed a net-like feeding pattern in the pelagic zone, and was documented to have rows of nematocysts. Few species within the genus are well defined.

In 2020, researchers working off the coast of Western Australia came across an Apolemia that had coiled itself into a spiral form. The outer "ring" was estimated to be 47 meters (154 feet) long, with an estimated total length of 119 meters (390 feet). This would make it longer than any other colonial organism, although individuals of the lion's mane jellyfish (Cyanea capillata) are known to be nearly as large.

=== Species ===
The following species are classified within the genus:

- Apolemia contorta (Margulis, 1976)
- Apolemia lanosa Siebert, Pugh, Haddock & Dunn, 2013
- Apolemia rubriversa Siebert, Pugh, Haddock & Dunn, 2013
- Apolemia uvaria (Lesueur, 1815)
- Apolemia vitiazi (Stepanjants, 1967)

== Anatomy ==
Siphonophores such as Apolemia are generally classified into three major types: Physonectae, Cystonectae, and Calycophorae. Apolemia spp. are classified within Physonectae, possessing this group's body plan; physonects have a pneumatophore towards the surface of the colony, and the nectosome towards the base. Individual zooids are oriented in either polyp or medusae forms, such as gastrozooids and nectophores (medusae). The orientation of these zooids helps in locomotion, propulsion, feeding, and defense. Most physonects are described as jellyfish-shaped, though Apolemia is an exception in this instance, aligned more laterally rather than rounded, such as conventional jellyfish.

=== Pneumatophore ===
Vertical displacement in Apolemia is facilitated by the presence of a pneumatophore, a regulating air-float (similar to a swim bladder) that allows the colony to displace itself both above and below the pycnocline depending on prey availability and ocean conditions. Expanding the air-float increases the colony's buoyancy in the water, allowing the colony to move higher in the water column; the reverse is also true when buoyancy decreases. In addition to assisting in prey location, should water conditions become less optimal due to pH fluctuation, temperature variations, or anoxic water zones, the colony is capable of evacuating the zone.

=== Nectophore ===
Horizontal displacement for Apolemia is facilitated by the presence of nectophores. Apolemia use nectophores for jet propulsion, expelling water to generate movement. Apolemia are colonial organisms and exhibit high-level communication. Smaller zooids are concentrated at the front of the siphonophore and are responsible for fine-scale movements such as turning. Larger zooids concentrate at the posterior and generate the bulk of the forward momentum.

=== Nematocysts ===
Predatory siphonophores such as Apolemia rely on nematocyst rows to inject toxins and incapacitate prey for the colony to feed. As Apolemia colonies grow and the chance of splitting increases, they may abandon their motile lifestyle in favor of a more sessile one. The newsworthy Apolemia found in 2020, measuring approximately 46 meters, was found coiled in a unique, spiraled shape, increasing the surface area covered in the pycnocline and increasing the likelihood of trapping prey.

== Ecology ==
Apolemia are carnivorous invertebrates. They have been documented to feed on small fish, crustaceans, copepods, other plankton, and even other siphonophores. They do so by extending long, curtain-like nematocyst rows into the water column, where prey become paralyzed.
