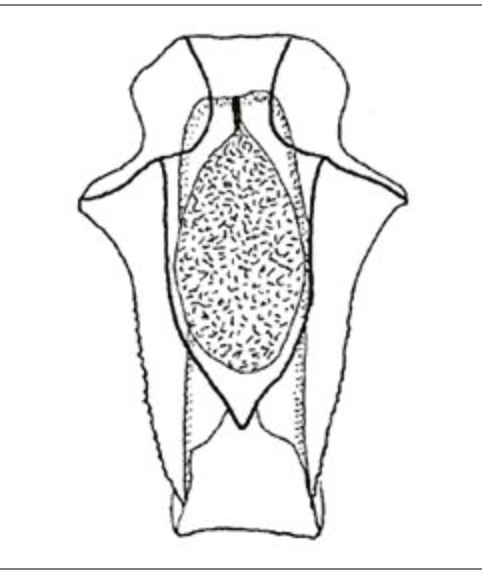
- Anatomy based on Quoy and Gaimard 1827

Scientific classification
- Kingdom: Animalia
- Phylum: Cnidaria
- Class: Hydrozoa
- Order: Siphonophorae
- Family: Abylidae
- Genus: Abyla
- Species: A. trigona

Binomial name
- Abyla trigona Quoy & Gaimard, 1827

Synonyms
- Abyla carina Haeckel, 1888; Abyla peruana Sears, 1953; Abyla schmidti Sears, 1953; Amphiroa carina Haeckel, 1888; Eudoxia trigonae Gegenbaur, 1859; Pseudabyla dubia Sears, 1953; Pseudabyla irregularis Sears, 1953

= Abyla trigona =

Species of hydrozoan

Abyla trigona is a colonial siphonophore in the family Abylidae. It was described in 1925.

== Description ==
The species has an anterior nectophore that is the same size both broad and wide. It also has very heavy irregular and serrate ridges. The ventral facet is not separated from the apico-ventral facet. The posterior nectophore can have from 4 to 11 teeth on a comb. It also has two rows of very serrated teeth on the basal margin.

== Distribution ==
The species is found mainly in tropical waters. Individuals were spotted in the South China Sea in the upper 200 metres (660 ft) during February and March. There are two records from the South Pacific and several in the western and central tropical Pacific.
