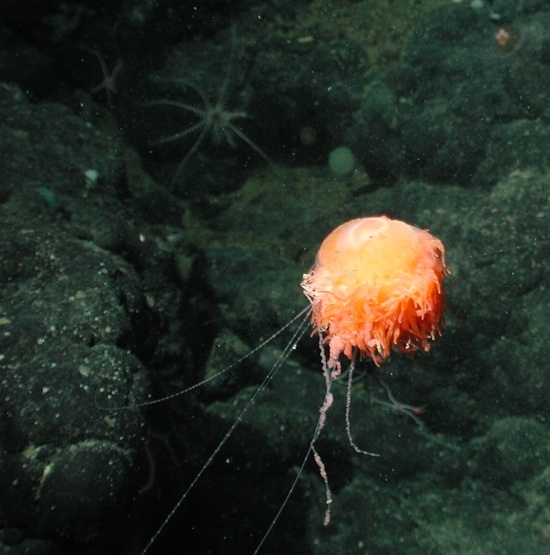

Scientific classification
- Kingdom: Animalia
- Phylum: Cnidaria
- Class: Hydrozoa
- Order: Siphonophorae
- Family: Rhodaliidae
- Genus: Dromalia
- Species: D. alexandri

Binomial name
- Dromalia alexandri Bigelow, 1911

= Dromalia =

Dromalia alexandri

Genus of deep-sea siphonophore

Dromalia is a monotypic genus of rhodaliid siphonophore, containing the single species Dromalia alexandri. It is one of several siphonophores commonly referred to as deep-sea dandelions.

== Description ==
D. alexandri is characterized by a distinctive pneumatophore compared to other rhodaliids. The pneumatophore has a flattened shape with several processes extending from its rim. Its walls are also notably thick and rigid compared to other genera.

Its zooids have a salmon pink or orange colour.

== Distribution ==
Specimens of D. alexandri have been collected in the Pacific ocean at depths ranging from 100 to 800 meters (330 to 2,620 ft).
