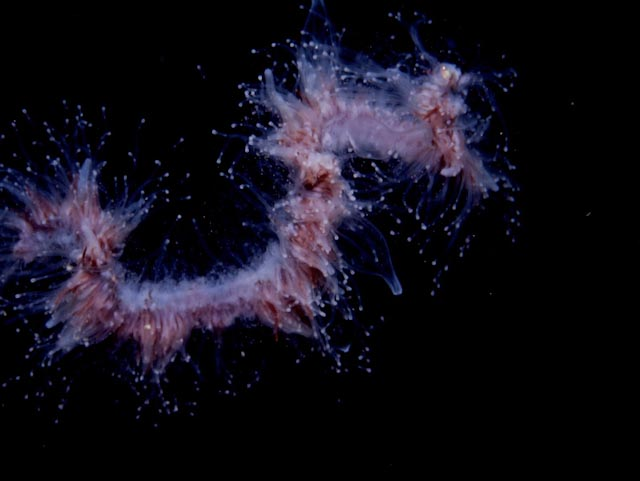

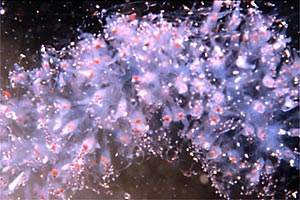
- Closeup

Scientific classification
- Kingdom: Animalia
- Phylum: Cnidaria
- Class: Hydrozoa
- Order: Siphonophorae
- Family: Apolemiidae
- Genus: Apolemia
- Species: A. uvaria

Binomial name
- Apolemia uvaria (Lesueur, 1815)

= Apolemia uvaria =

Siphonophore in the family Apolemiidae

Apolemia uvaria, commonly known as string jellyfish, or barbed wire jellyfish, is a colonial siphonophore. As with all siphonophores, string jellyfish look and function much like a single organism, but each "individual" Apolemia uvaria is in fact a colony of specialised minute organisms (zooids), permanently attached to each other and physiologically connected to the extent that they cannot survive alone.

String jellyfish colonies may reach 3 m (9.8 ft) in total length and have a diameter of 2–5 cm (0.79–1.97 in). The colony is formed of a central string, bearing groups of pink and white tentacles, which clump together or extend. The whole colony has a nectosome or pneumatophore which is a gas float at the front followed by a set of swimming bells (nectophores) for moving forward. This colonial animal is pelagic and is found in oceans worldwide in the midwater. They are often found at surface level but can also be found at depths of around 1,000 m (3,300 ft). These ocean predators act like drift nets, spreading their tentacles widely to catch plankton. Their tentacles can sting humans painfully.

As of 2025, string jellyfish have been proliferating in seas around Norway and Scotland. Here Apolemia uvaria has preyed on farmed salmon, resulting in mass deaths among the aquaculture. The increase in predation has been attributed to rising sea temperatures, and to fish farms discarding waste upon which the jellyfish feed. In turbulent seas or environments with physical barriers, Apolemia uvaria can break into smaller fragments to enter fish cages and access these farmed salmon.

In September 2007, A. uvaria were spotted in surface waters and near the seabed off of South Devon and South East Cornwall. They were also spotted for the first time offshore of Plymouth. The sightings are most likely due to sea water and some differences in ocean currents in the Atlantic.
