= Hoei (disambiguation) =

Hoei may refer to:

- Hōei (宝永), a Japanese era name
- Hōei (胞泳), the Japanese name for Physonectae
- Banpresto, a Japanese toy company previously known as Hoei Sangyo
- Huy (Dutch: Hoei), a municipality in Liège, Belgium
