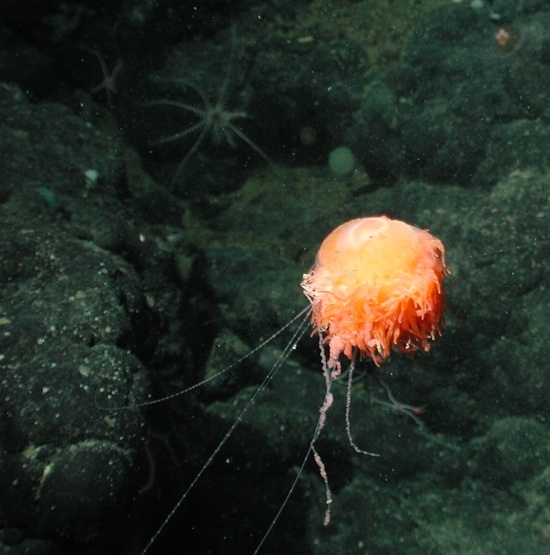
- Dromalia alexandri

Scientific classification
- Kingdom: Animalia
- Phylum: Cnidaria
- Class: Hydrozoa
- Order: Siphonophorae
- Suborder: Physonectae
- Family: Rhodaliidae; Haeckel, 1888

Type genus
- Rhodalia Haeckel, 1888

Genera
- Angelopsis Fewkes, 1886; Arancialia Hissmann, 2005; Archangelopsis Lens & van Riemsdijk, 1908; Dendrogramma Just, Kristensen & Olesen, 2014; Dromalia Bigelow, 1911; Rhodalia Haeckel, 1888; Steleophysema Moser, 1924; Stephalia Haeckel, 1888; Thermopalia Pugh, 1983; Tridensa Hissmann, 2005

Synonyms
- Angelidae Fewkes, 1886 (not Angelidae Giglio-Tos, 1927); Rhodalidae Haeckel, 1888

= Rhodaliidae =

Family of hydrozoans

Rhodaliidae is a family of siphonophores. In Japanese they are called ヒノマルクラゲ (hinomarukurage).

Rhodaliids have a characteristic gas-secreting structure called aurophore. Below the enlarged pneumatophore (float), the siphosome and nectosome are contracted into a complex. Rhodaliids have a benthic lifestyle and use their tentacles to attach themselves to the seafloor.

== Genera and species ==
Rhodaliidae contains the following subtaxa:

- Angelopsis Fewkes, 1886
  - Angelopsis euryale Pugh, 1983
  - Angelopsis globosa Fewkes, 1886
- Arancialia Hissmann, 2005
  - Arancialia captonia Hissmann, 2005
- Archangelopsis Lens & van Riemsdijk, 1908
  - Archangelopsis jagoa Hissmann, Schauer & Pugh, 1995
  - Archangelopsis typica Lens & van Riemsdijk, 1908
- Dendrogramma Just, Kristensen & Olesen, 2014
  - Dendrogramma enigmatica Just, Kristensen & Olesen, 2014
- Dromalia Bigelow, 1911
  - Dromalia alexandri Bigelow, 1911
- Rhodalia Haeckel, 1888
  - Rhodalia miranda Haeckel, 1888
- Steleophysema Moser, 1924
  - Steleophysema aurophora Moser, 1924
- Stephalia Haeckel, 1888
  - Stephalia bathyphysa (Haeckel, 1888)
  - Stephalia corona Haeckel, 1888
  - Stephalia dilata (Bigelow, 1911)
- Thermopalia Pugh, 1983
  - Thermopalia taraxaca Pugh, 1983
- Tridensa Hissmann, 2005
  - Tridensa rotunda Hissmann, 2005
  - Tridensa sulawensis Hissmann, 2005
