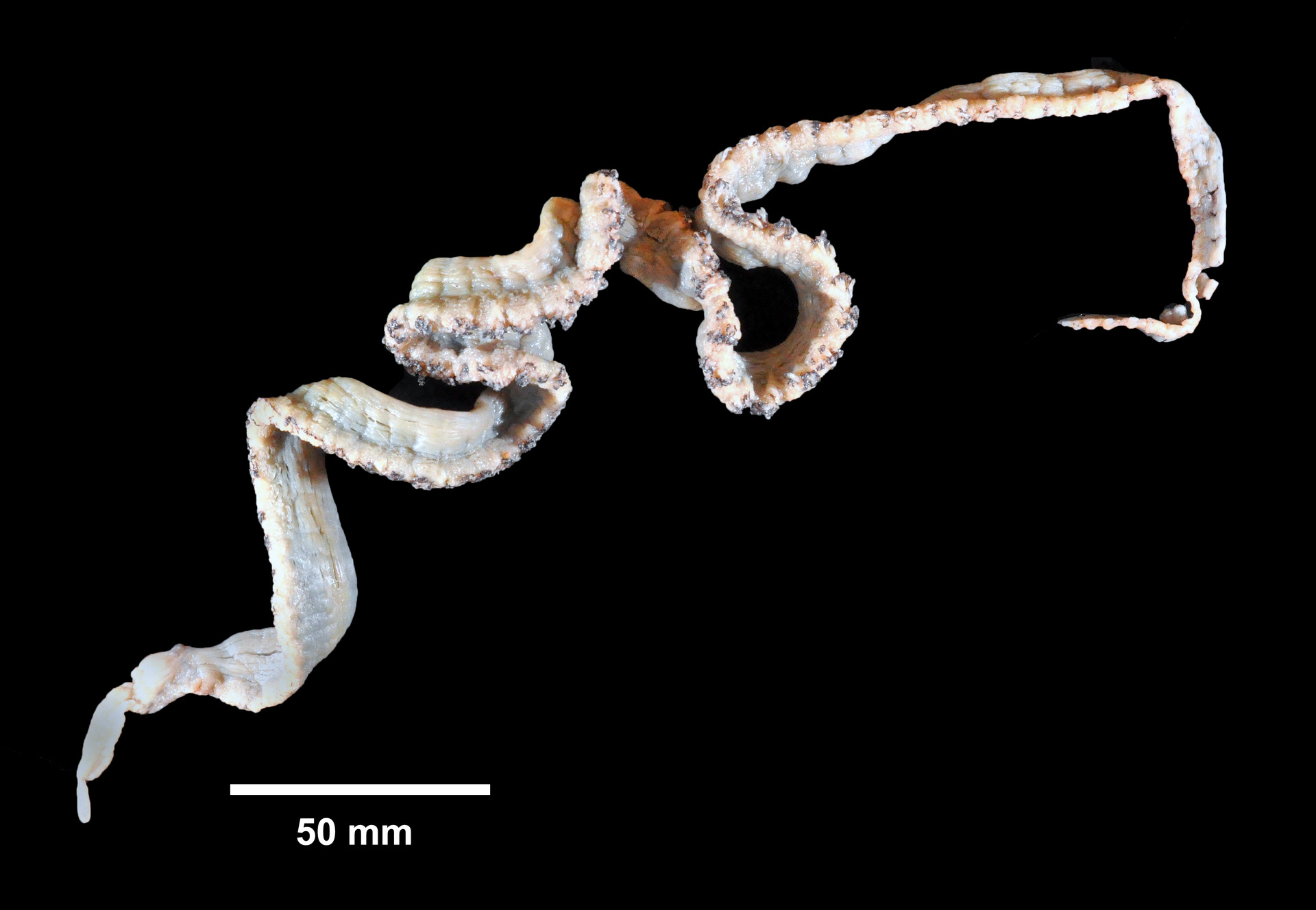

Scientific classification
- Kingdom: Animalia
- Phylum: Cnidaria
- Class: Hydrozoa
- Order: Siphonophorae
- Family: Erennidae
- Genus: Erenna; Bedot, 1904

= Erenna =

Genus of hydrozoans

Erenna is a genus of cnidarians belonging to the family Erennidae.

The species of this genus are found in Europe, North America and Southeast Asia.

The species E. sirena is the second animal found to produce red light (the first being the Stomiidae dragonfish) and the first invertebrate to produce red bioluminescence.

E. insidiator and E. sirena are two species of Erenna that were discovered near California and Mexico in 2016. This discovery has allowed for the identification of three different types of tentilla on tentacles.

Species:

- Erenna cornuta Pugh, 2001
- Erenna insidiator Pugh & Haddock, 2016
- Erenna laciniata Pugh, 2001
- Erenna richardi Bedot, 1904
- Erenna sirena Pugh & Haddock, 2016
