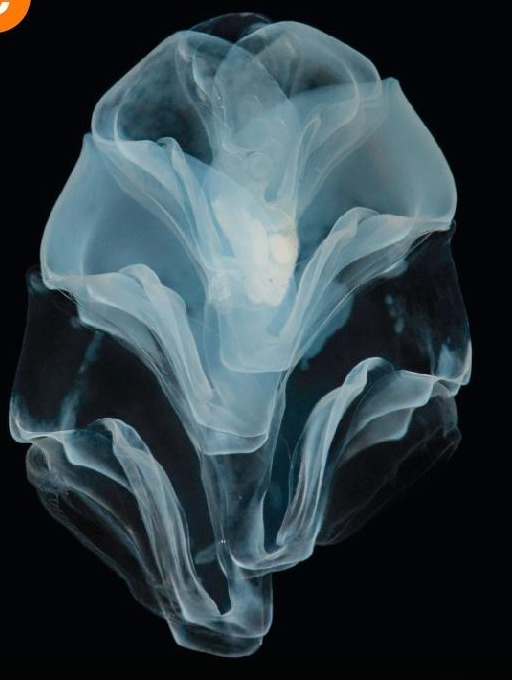
- Hippopodius hippopus

Scientific classification
- Kingdom: Animalia
- Phylum: Cnidaria
- Class: Hydrozoa
- Order: Siphonophorae
- Suborder: Calycophorae
- Family: Hippopodiidae; Kölliker, 1853

= Hippopodiidae =

Family of cnidarians

Hippopodiidae is a family of cnidarians belonging to the order Siphonophorae.

Genera:

- Hippopodius Quoy & Gaimard, 1827
- Vogtia Kölliker, 1853
