= Tottonophyidae =

Scientific classification
- Kingdom: Animalia
- Phylum: Cnidaria
- Class: Hydrozoa
- Order: Siphonophorae
- Suborder: Calycophorae
- Family: Tottonophyidae; Pugh, Dunn & Haddock, 2018
- Genus: Tottonophyes; Pugh, Dunn & Haddock, 2018
- Species: T. enigmatica

Binomial name
- Tottonophyes enigmatica Pugh, Dunn & Haddock, 2018

Family of hydrozoans

Tottonophyidae is a family of marine hydrozoans in the order Siphonophorae. It consists of one genus, Tottonophyes, which consists one species, Tottonophyes enigmatica. The type locality is Monterey Bay.
