= Abylopsis =

- Illustration of Abylopsis tetragona

Scientific classification
- Kingdom: Animalia
- Phylum: Cnidaria
- Class: Hydrozoa
- Order: Siphonophorae
- Family: Abylidae
- Subfamily: Abylopsinae
- Genus: Abylopsis; Chun, 1888

Type species
- Abylopsis quincunx Chun, 1888 (accepted as Abylopsis eschscholtzii (Huxley, 1859))

Species
- Abylopsis eschscholtzii (Huxley, 1859); Abylopsis tetragona (Otto, 1823); Abylopsis anomala (Sears, 1953) (taxon inquirendum, aberration)

Synonyms
- Abylopsoides Sears, 1953; Aglaisma Eschscholtz, 1829; Aglaismoides Huxley, 1859; Aglaja Eschscholtz, 1825 (not in use); Calpe Quoy & Gaimard, 1827 (preoccupied by Calpe Treitschke 1825); Chunia Mayer, 1900; Plethosoma Lesson & Garnot, 1826; Pseudabylopsis Sears, 1953; Pyramis Otto, 1823 (preoccupied by Pyramis Röding 1798 Mollusca)

Genus of siphonophore

Abylopsis is a siphonophore genus in the Abylidae. The genus contains bioluminescent species.
