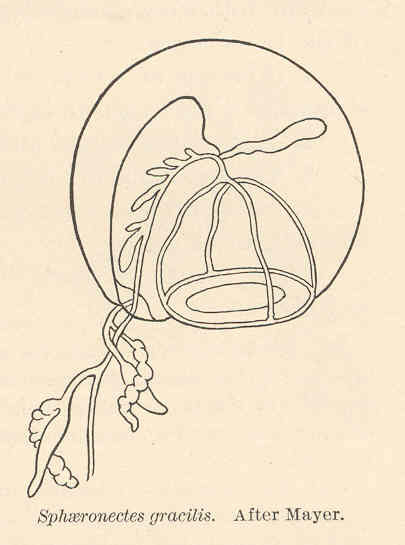
- Sphaeronectes gracilis

Scientific classification
- Domain: Eukaryota
- Kingdom: Animalia
- Phylum: Cnidaria
- Class: Hydrozoa
- Order: Siphonophorae
- Family: Sphaeronectidae
- Genus: Sphaeronectes; Huxley, 1859

Synonyms
- Conophyes Leloup, 1934; Monophyes Claus, 1873

= Sphaeronectes =

Genus of hydrozoans

Sphaeronectes is a genus of cnidarians belonging to the family Sphaeronectidae.

The genus has almost cosmopolitan distribution.

Species:

- Sphaeronectes bougisi Carré, 1968
- Sphaeronectes brevitruncata (Chun, 1888)
- Sphaeronectes christiansonae Pugh, 2009
- Sphaeronectes fragilis Carré, 1968
- Sphaeronectes gamulini Carré, 1968
- Sphaeronectes haddocki Pugh, 2009
- Sphaeronectes irregularis (Claus, 1873)
- Sphaeronectes koellikeri Huxley, 1859
- Sphaeronectes pagesi Lindsay, Grossmann & Minemizu, 2011
- Sphaeronectes pughi Grossmann, Lindsay & Fuentes, 2012
- Sphaeronectes tasmanica Gershwin, Lewis, Gowlett-Holmes & Kloser, 2014
- Sphaeronectes tiburonae Pugh, 2009
