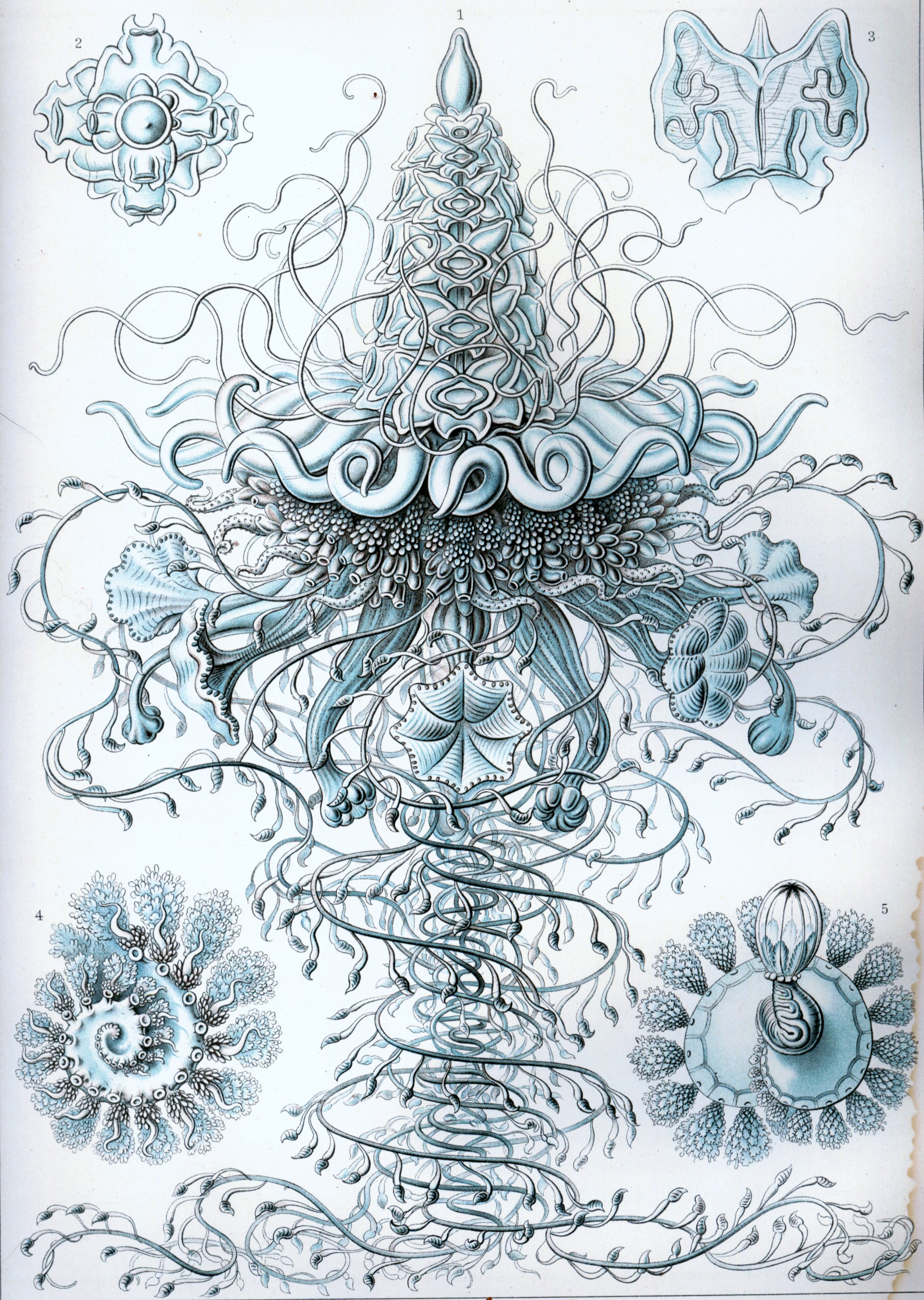
- Physophora hydrostatica

Scientific classification
- Kingdom: Animalia
- Phylum: Cnidaria
- Class: Hydrozoa
- Order: Siphonophorae
- Suborder: Physonectae
- Family: Physophoridae; Eschscholtz, 1829
- Genus: Physophora; Forsskål, 1775

= Physophora =

Family of hydrozoan

Physophora is a genus of siphonophores. It is the only genus in the family Physophoridae.

Species:

- Physophora hydrostatica Forsskål, 1775
- Physophora gilmeri Pugh, 2005
