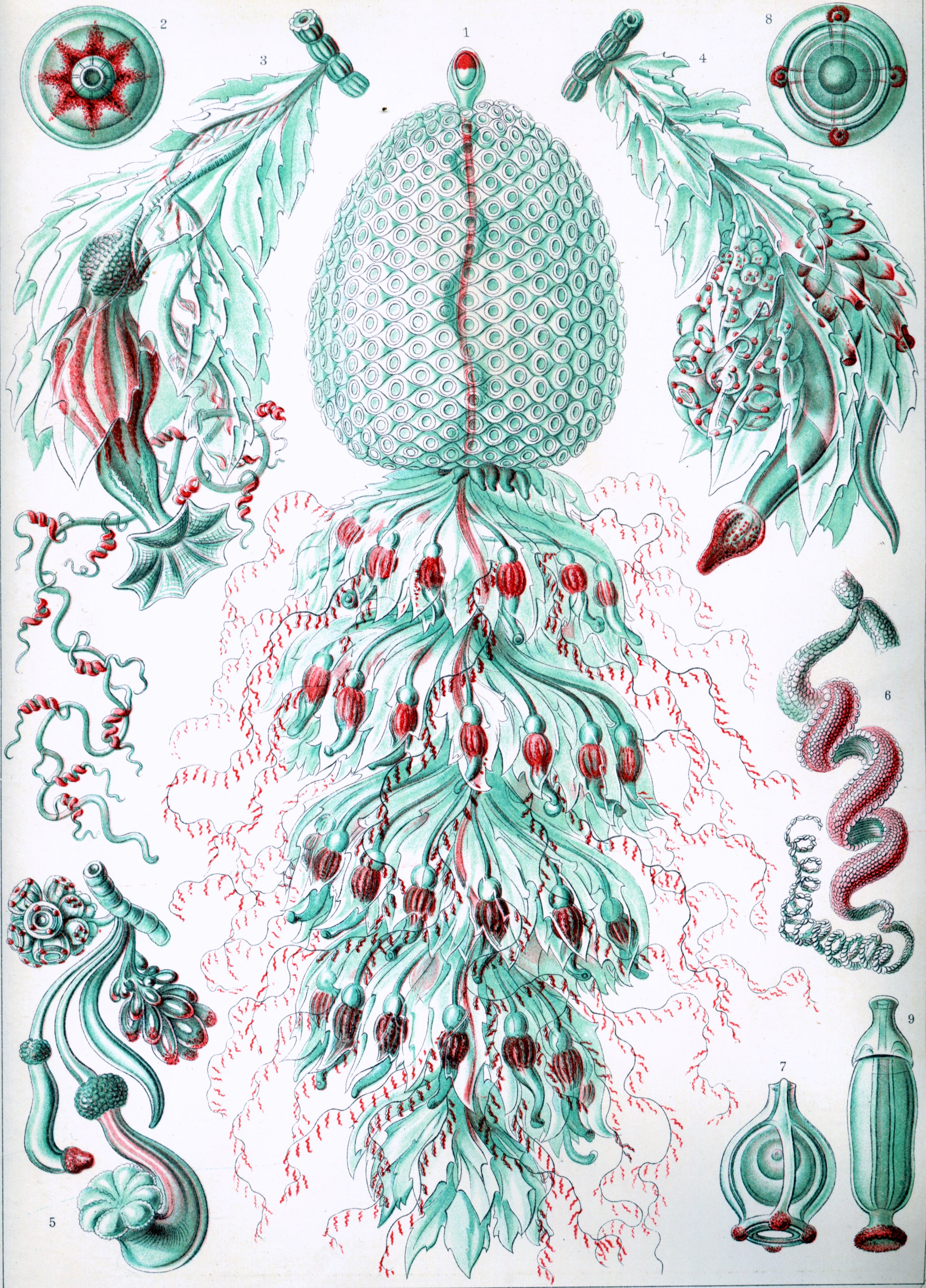
- Forskalia sp.

Scientific classification
- Kingdom: Animalia
- Phylum: Cnidaria
- Class: Hydrozoa
- Order: Siphonophorae
- Suborder: Physonectae
- Family: Forskaliidae; Haeckel, 1888
- Genus: Forskalia; Kölliker, 1853

= Forskalia =

Genus of siphonophores

Forskalia is a genus of siphonophores. It is the only genus in the monotypic family Forskaliidae.

== Species ==
The following species are classified within the genus Forskalia:

- Forskalia asymmetrica Pugh, 2003
- Forskalia contorta (Milne-Edwards, 1841)
- Forskalia edwardsii Kölliker, 1853
- Forskalia formosa Keferstein & Ehlers, 1860
- Forskalia saccula Pugh, 2003
- Forskalia tholoides Haeckel, 1888
