= Kephyes =

Scientific classification
- Domain: Eukaryota
- Kingdom: Animalia
- Phylum: Cnidaria
- Class: Hydrozoa
- Order: Siphonophorae
- Family: Clausophyidae
- Genus: Kephyes; Pugh, 2006

Genus of hydrozoans

Kephyes is a genus of cnidarians belonging to the family Clausophyidae.

Species:

- Kephyes hiulcus Grossmann & Lindsay, 2017
- Kephyes ovata (Keferstein & Ehlers, 1860)
