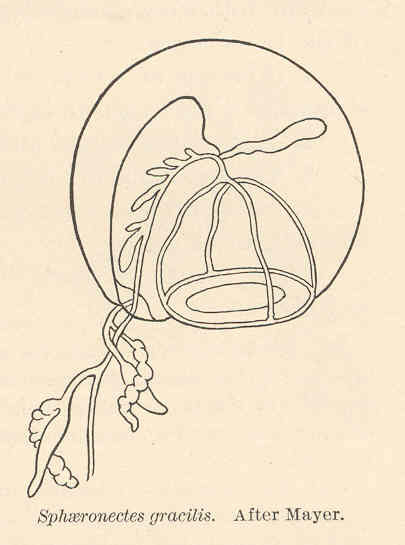
- Spheronectes gracilis

Scientific classification
- Kingdom: Animalia
- Phylum: Cnidaria
- Class: Hydrozoa
- Order: Siphonophorae
- Family: Sphaeronectidae

= Sphaeronectidae =

Family of hydrozoans

Sphaeronectidae is a family of cnidarians belonging to the order Siphonophorae.

Genera:

- Ediacara
- Sphaeronectes Huxley, 1859
