= Erennidae =

Scientific classification
- Kingdom: Animalia
- Phylum: Cnidaria
- Class: Hydrozoa
- Order: Siphonophorae
- Family: Erennidae

Family of hydrozoans

Erennidae is a family of cnidarians belonging to the order Siphonophorae.

Genera:

- Erenna Bedot, 1904
- Parerenna Pugh, 2001
