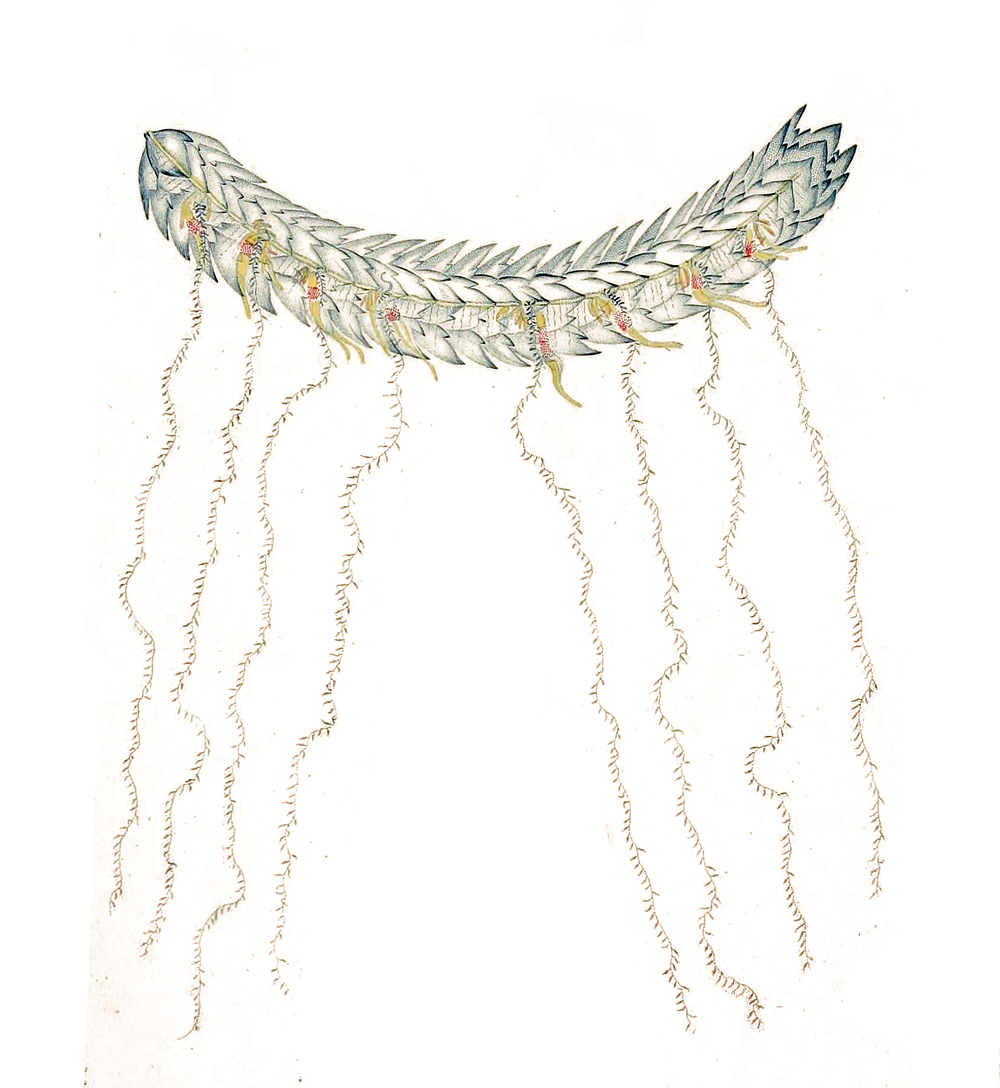
- Stephanomia imbricata

Scientific classification
- Kingdom: Animalia
- Phylum: Cnidaria
- Class: Hydrozoa
- Order: Siphonophorae
- Family: Stephanomiidae; Thomas Henry Huxley, 1859

= Stephanomiidae =

Family of hydrozoans

Stephanomiidae is a monotypic family of cnidarians belonging to the order Siphonophorae. It has only 1 Genus; Stephanomia

Genera:

- Stephanomia Lesueur & Petit, 1807
