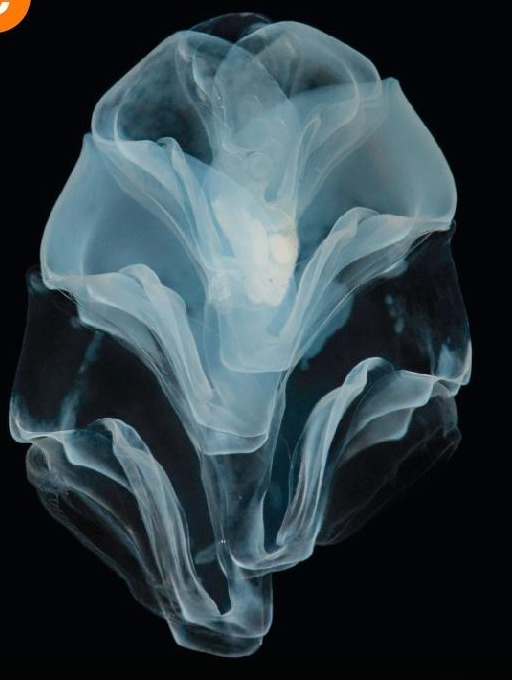

Scientific classification
- Kingdom: Animalia
- Phylum: Cnidaria
- Class: Hydrozoa
- Order: Siphonophorae
- Family: Hippopodiidae
- Genus: Hippopodius
- Species: H. hippopus

Binomial name
- Hippopodius hippopus Forsskål, 1776

= Hippopodius hippopus =

Species of hydrozoan

Hippopodius hippopus is a mainly epipelagic and sometimes mesopelagic cnidarian of the order siphonophorae in the monotypic family Hippopodiidae, in which it is the only member of its family and genus. It is found in the Pacific Ocean, Atlantic Ocean, the Mediterranean, and off the coast of Thailand and Indonesia at around 0-300 meters (980ft) below sea level. They prefer warm water and can be found at around 50°N-38°S latitude.
