= Pyrostephidae =

Scientific classification
- Kingdom: Animalia
- Phylum: Cnidaria
- Class: Hydrozoa
- Order: Siphonophorae
- Family: Pyrostephidae

Family of hydrozoans

Pyrostephidae is a family of cnidarians belonging to the order Siphonophorae.

Genera:

- Bargmannia Totton, 1954
- Pyrostephos Moser, 1925
