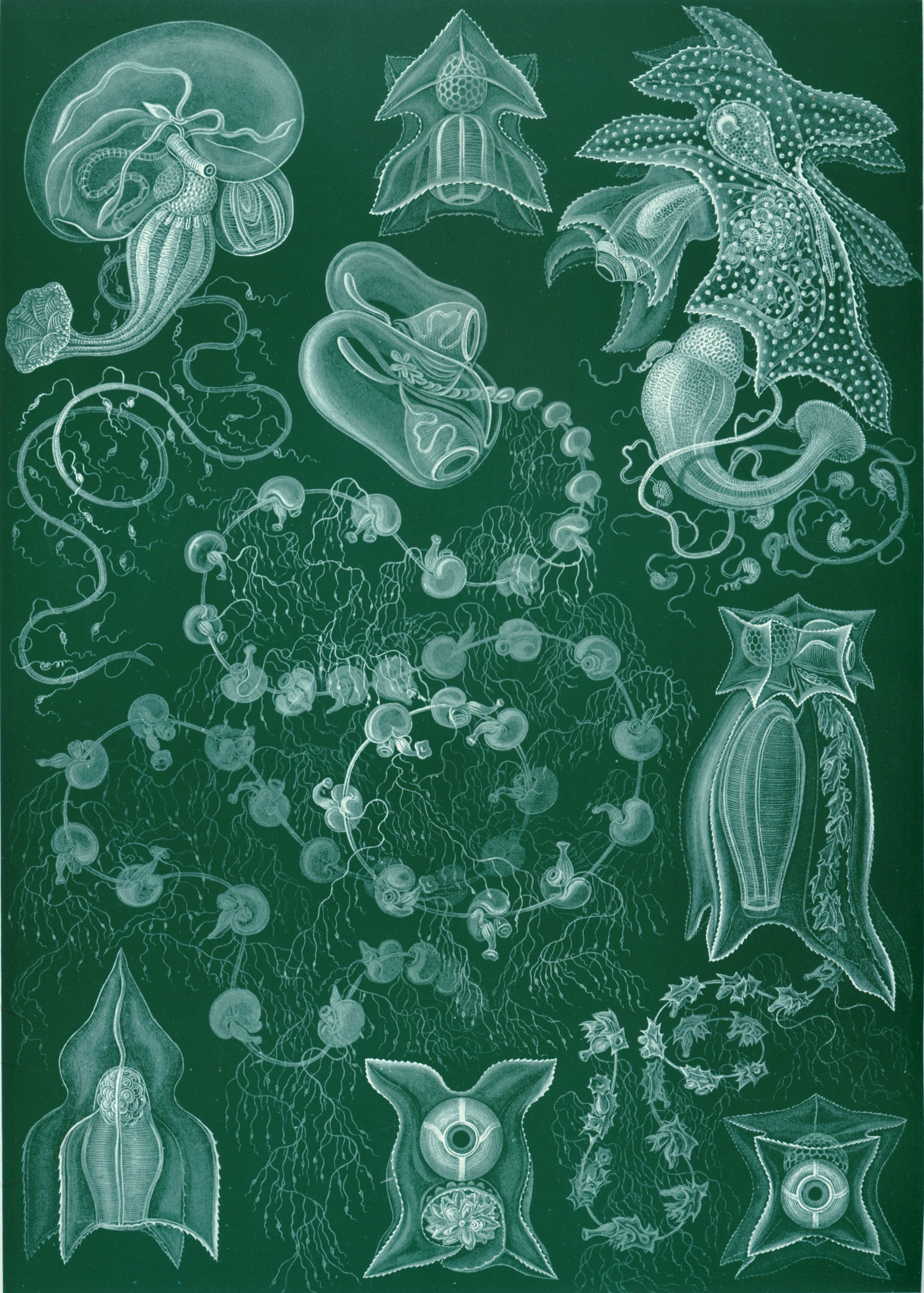
- Bassia bassensis: right = colony, top center = upper bell from above, bottom right = upper bell inside, bottom center = lower bell from below, top right = group of an infertile and a male medusa, bottom left = female medusa

Scientific classification
- Kingdom: Animalia
- Phylum: Cnidaria
- Class: Hydrozoa
- Order: Siphonophorae
- Suborder: Calycophorae
- Family: Abylidae; L. Agassiz, 1862

= Abylidae =

Family of hydrozoans

The Abylidae are a family of marine invertebrates in the order Siphonophorae. They are colonial, but the colonies can superficially resemble jellyfish; although they appear to be a single organism, each specimen is actually a colony of Siphonophora.

It contains the following taxa:

- Subfamily Abylinae L. Agassiz, 1862
  - Genus Abyla Quoy & Gaimard, 1827
    - Abyla bicarinata Moser, 1925
    - Abyla haeckeli Lens & van Reimsdijk, 1908
    - Abyla trigona Quoy & Gaimard, 1827
  - Genus Ceratocymba Chun, 1888
    - Ceratocymba dentata (Bigelow, 1918)
    - Ceratocymba leuckartii (Huxley, 1859)
    - Ceratocymba sagittata Quoy & Gaimard, 1827
- Subfamily Abylopsinae Totton, 1954
  - Genus Abylopsis Chun, 1888
    - Abylopsis eschscholtzii Huxley, 1859
    - Abylopsis tetragona Otto, 1823
  - Genus Bassia L. Agassiz, 1862
    - Bassia bassensis Quoy & Gaimard, 1827
  - Genus Enneagonum Quoy & Gaimard, 1827
    - Enneagonum hyalinum Quoy & Gaimard, 1827
