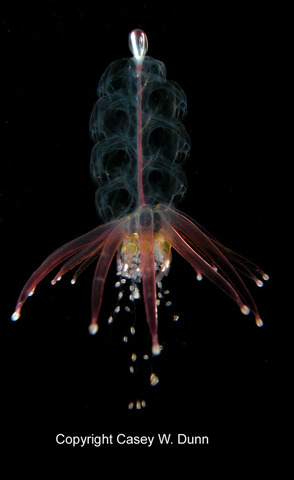

Scientific classification
- Kingdom: Animalia
- Phylum: Cnidaria
- Class: Hydrozoa
- Order: Siphonophorae
- Family: Physophoridae
- Genus: Physophora
- Species: P. hydrostatica

Binomial name
- Physophora hydrostatica Forsskål, 1775

= Physophora hydrostatica =

Species of hydrozoan

Physophora hydrostatica, also known as hula skirt siphonophore, is a species of siphonophore in the family Physophoridae.
