= Clausophyidae =

Scientific classification
- Kingdom: Animalia
- Phylum: Cnidaria
- Class: Hydrozoa
- Order: Siphonophorae
- Family: Clausophyidae

Family of hydrozoans

Clausophyidae is a family of cnidarians belonging to the order Siphonophorae.

Genera:

- Chuniphyes Lens & van Riemsdijk, 1908
- Clausophyes Lens & van Riemsdijk, 1908
- Crystallophyes Moser, 1925
- Heteropyramis Moser, 1925
- Kephyes Pugh, 2006
