= Cordagalmatidae =

Scientific classification
- Kingdom: Animalia
- Phylum: Cnidaria
- Class: Hydrozoa
- Order: Siphonophorae
- Family: Cordagalmatidae

Family of cnidarians

Cordagalmatidae is a family of cnidarians belonging to the order Siphonophorae.

Genera:

- Cardianecta Pugh, 2016
- Cordagalma Totton, 1932
