= Resomiidae =

Scientific classification
- Kingdom: Animalia
- Phylum: Cnidaria
- Class: Hydrozoa
- Order: Siphonophorae
- Family: Resomiidae; Pugh, 2006

Family of hydrozoans

Resomiidae is a family of cnidarians belonging to the order Siphonophorae.

Genera:

- Resomia Pugh, 2006
