= Adolph Wilhelm Otto =

German anatomist (1786–1845)

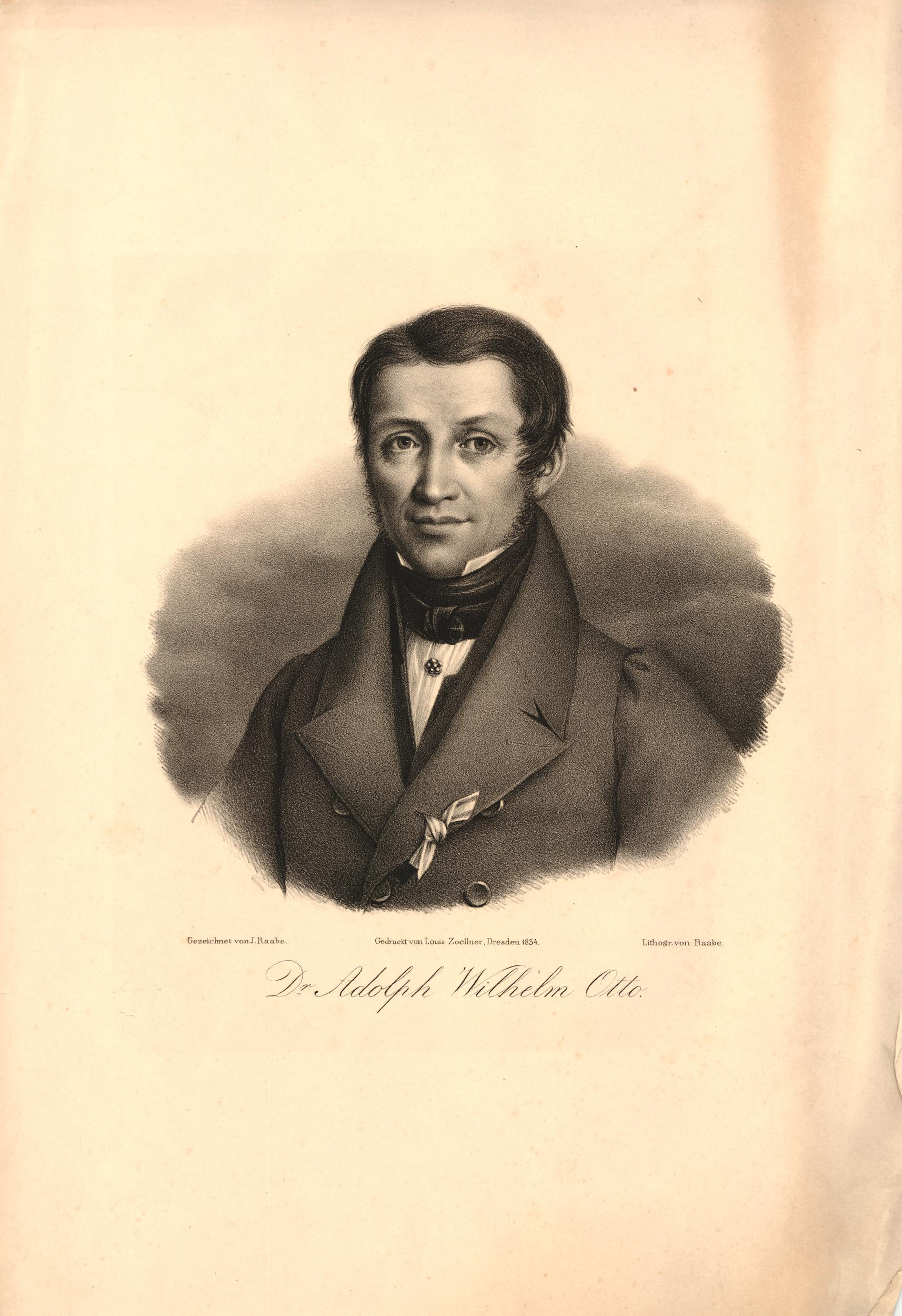
Adolph Wilhelm Otto

Adolph Wilhelm Otto (3 August 1786 – 14 January 1845) was a German anatomist who was a native of Greifswald.

In 1808 he earned his medical doctorate at the University of Greifswald, and subsequently worked as a prosector and physician in Carl August Wilhelm Berends' clinic at the University of Frankfurt an der Oder. Later, he furthered his education on a scientific journey through Germany, the Netherlands and France, where he studied comparative anatomy with Georges Cuvier (1769-1832). In 1813 he became a professor of anatomy and director of the anatomical museum at the University of Breslau.

Otto specialized in the field of teratology, and performed extensive research involving the causes, development and classification of congenital malformations in plants and animals. In 1841 he published a popular atlas of teratology titled Monstrorum sexcentorum descriptio anatomica (600 Anatomic Descriptions of Monsters). He contributed articles to several journals and was a collaborator to Karl Gustav Carus' Erläuterungstafeln zur vergleichenden Anatomie. He also wrote "Conspectus animalium quorundam maritimorum" (Inaug. dissert, Vratislaviae : 1-20) and many other scientific papers in which he described marine animals. He is honoured in the gastropod name Calliotropis ottoi (Philippi 1844).

In 1831, he was elected a foreign member of the Royal Swedish Academy of Sciences.

== Associated eponym ==
- "Otto-Chrobak pelvis": Protrusion of the acetabulum into the pelvic cavity. Named in conjunction with Austrian gynecologist Rudolf Chrobak (1843-1910).
