= Fanny Moser (scientist) =

Swiss-German zoologist

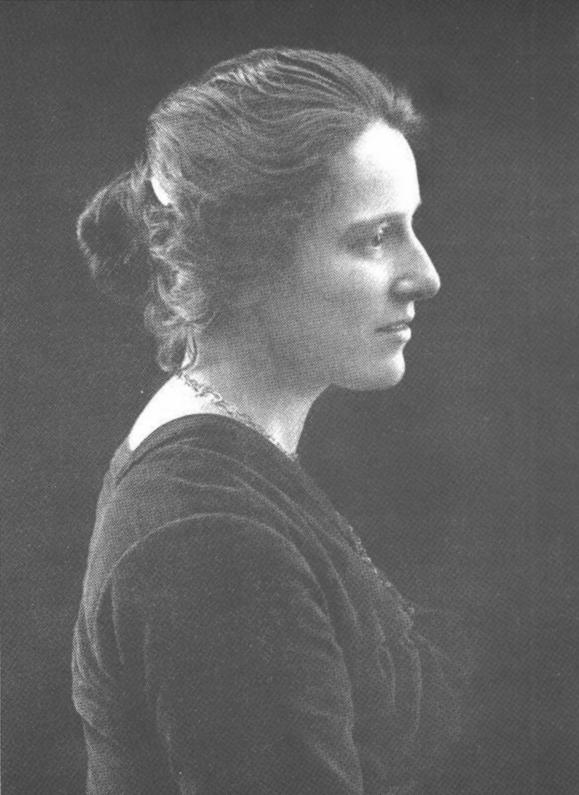
- Born: May 27, 1872
- Died: February 24, 1953 (aged 80)
- Other names: Fanny Hoppe-Moser
- Education: University of Freiburg
- Known for: First female student to register at the University of Freiburg
- Spouse: Jaroslav Hoppe
- Scientific career
- Fields: Zoology
- Thesis: (1902)

Fanny Moser, also known as Fanny Hoppe-Moser, (27 May 1872 – 24 February 1953) was a Swiss-German zoologist.

Her father Johan-Heinrich Moser was an engineer and built the Moser dam in Schaffhausen. In 1896 Fanny Moser became the first female student to register at the University of Freiburg, where she studied medicine. She then began studying zoology in Munich and received her doctorate in 1902, specialising in the developmental history of the vertebrate lung. In 1903 she married the composer Jaroslav Hoppe. They moved to Berlin and Moser began her international research, which included identifying nine new species, most notably the cold-water southern physonect Pyrostephos vanhoeffeni that was collected from the South Pole expedition for the Museum of Natural History in Berlin. The prince of Monaco commissioned her to work on his zoological deep sea collection.

She became involved with parapsychology in 1914, releasing a work on the topic in 1935.
