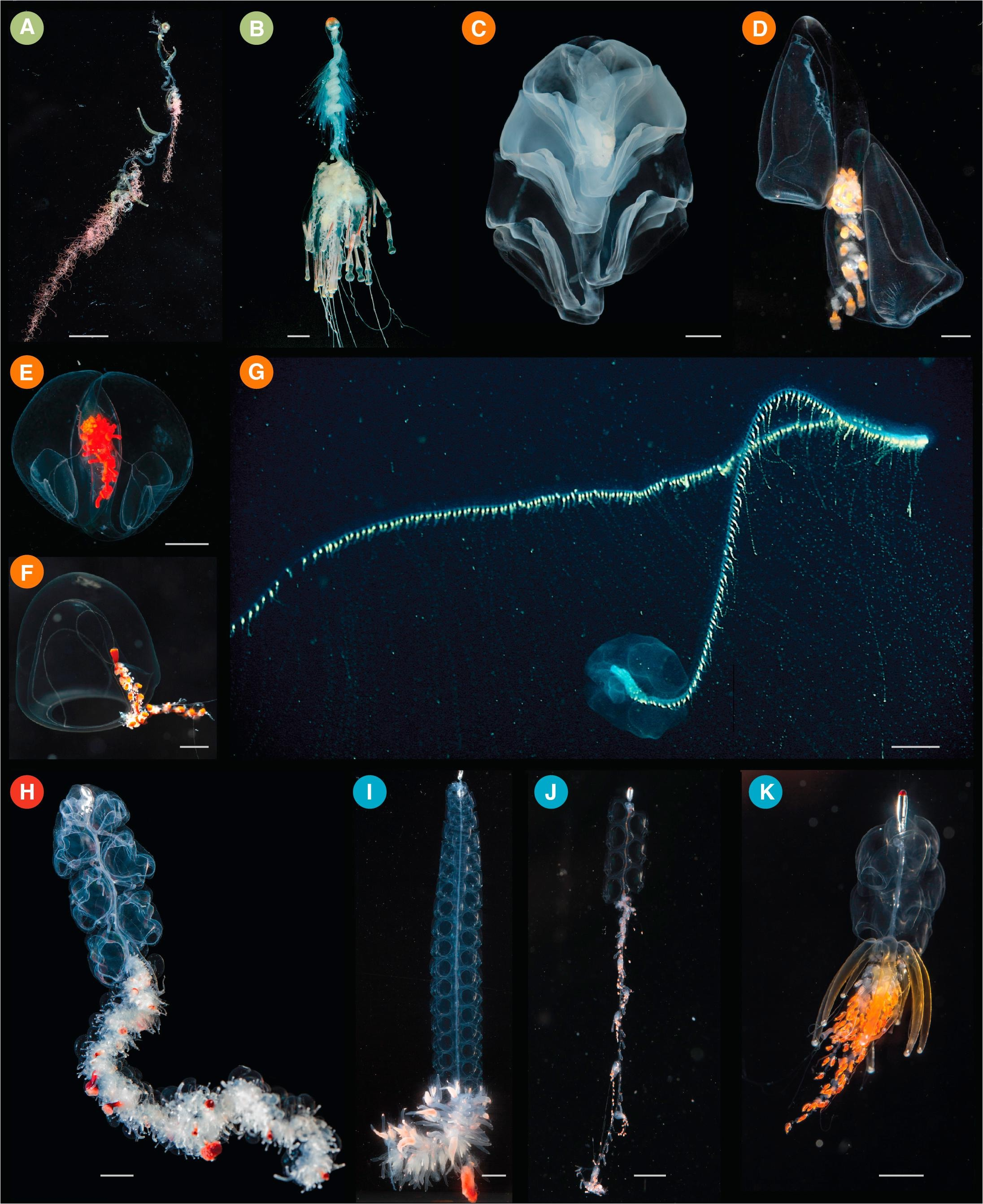
- (A) Rhizophysa eysenhardtii scale bar = 1 cm, (B) Bathyphysa conifera 2 cm, (C) Hippopodius hippopus 5 mm, (D) Kephyes hiulcus 2 mm (E) Desmophyes haematogaster 5 mm (F) Sphaeronectes christiansonae 2 mm, (G) Praya dubia 4 cm, (H) Apolemia sp. 1 cm, (I) Lychnagalma utricularia 1 cm, (J) Nanomia sp. 1 cm, (K) Physophora hydrostatica 5 mm

Scientific classification
- Kingdom: Animalia
- Phylum: Cnidaria
- Class: Hydrozoa
- Subclass: Hydroidolina
- Order: Siphonophorae; Eschscholtz, 1829

Suborders
- Cystonectae; Clade Codonophora: Physonectae (Which includes Calycophorae)

Synonyms
- Siphonophora Eschscholtz, 1829

= Siphonophore =

Order of colonial hydrozoans with differentiated zooids

Siphonophores (from Ancient Greek σίφων [siphōn], meaning 'tube' and -φόρος [-phóros], meaning 'bearing') are cnidarian animals of the hydrozoan order Siphonophorae. According to the World Register of Marine Species, the order contains 194 species described thus far.

Siphonophores are highly polymorphic and complex organisms, which blur the line between individual organisms ("regular" animals, built from organs and cells) and colonial organisms (e.g., corals, where each polyp can in principle live on its own). Each specimen is composed of medusoid and polypoid zooids that are morphologically and functionally specialized. Zooids are multicellular units that develop from a single fertilized egg and combine to create functional colonies able to reproduce, digest, float, maintain body positioning, and use jet propulsion to move. Most colonies are long, thin, transparent floaters living in the pelagic zone.

Like other hydrozoans, some siphonophores emit light to attract and attack prey. While many sea animals produce blue and green bioluminescence, a siphonophore, Erenna sirena, was only the second life form found to produce a red light (the first being the scaleless dragonfish Chirostomias pliopterus).

== Anatomy and morphology ==
=== Colony characteristics ===
Siphonophores are colonial hydrozoans that do not exhibit alternation of generations, but instead reproduce asexually through a budding process. Zooids are the multicellular units that build the colonies of a siphonophore. A single bud called the pro-bud initiates the growth of a colony by undergoing fission. Each zooid is produced to be genetically identical, however, mutations can alter their functions and increase diversity of the zooids within the colony. Siphonophores are unique in that the pro-bud initiates the production of diverse zooids with specific functions. The functions and organizations of the zooids in colonies vary widely among the different species, however the majority of colonies are bilaterally arranged with dorsal and ventral sides to the central stem (the stem is the vertical branch in the center of the colony to which the zooids attach). Zooids typically have special functions, and thus assume specific spatial patterns along the stem.

=== General morphology ===
Siphonophores typically exhibit one of three standard body plans matching the suborders: Cystonectae, Physonectae, and Calycophorae. Cystonects have a long stem with attached zooids. Each group of zooids contains a gastrozooid. The gastrozooid consisting of a tentacle used for capturing and digesting food. The groups also have gonophores that are specialized for reproduction. They use a pneumatophore (a gas filled float), on their anterior end to drift at the surface of the water or stay afloat in the deep sea. Physonects have a pneumatophore and nectosome, which uses the nectophores for jet propulsion, in which the nectophores pump water backwards in order to move forward. Calycophorans differ from cystonects and physonects in that they have two nectophores and no pneumatophore. Instead, they typically possess oil filled glands that help with buoyancy.

Moreover, siphonophores possess multiple types of zooids. Scientists have determined two possible evolutionary hypotheses for this observation: 1. as time progresses, zooid types have increased; and 2. the last common ancestor had many types of zooids and the diversity seen today is due to loss of zooid types. Research shows no evidence supporting the first hypothesis, and has seen some evidence in support of the second.

==== Zooids ====
A zooid is a single part of an organism that makes up the greater whole. In general, siphonophore colonies have a modular body plan, with many different zooids making up the overall structure. These types can include feeding gastrozooids, movement zooids, and sensory zooids.
Specifically, feeding zooids in siphonophores have undergone many unique adaptations to service the deep. Gastrozooids are uniquely specialized organisms that have feeding polyps (similar to a mouth) along with a long tentacle with side branches which is used to capture the prey. This adaptation is unique to zooids living in siphonophore colonies.

==== Nectophores ====
Nectophores are medusae that assist in the propulsion and movement of some siphonophores in water. They are characteristic in physonectae and calycophores. The nectophores of these organisms are located in the nectosome where they can coordinate the swimming of colonies. The nectophores have also been observed in working in conjunction with reproductive structures in order to provide propulsion during colony detachment.

==== Bracts ====
Bracts are zooids that are unique to the siphonophorae order. They function in protection and maintaining a neutral buoyancy. However, bracts are not present in all species of siphonophore.

==== Gastrozooids ====
Gastrozooids are polyps that have evolved a function to assist in the feeding of siphonophores.

==== Palpons ====
Palpons are modified gastrozooids that function in digestion by regulating the circulation of gastrovascular fluids.

==== Gonophores ====
Gonophores are zooids that are involved in the reproductive processes of the siphonophores.

==== Pneumatophores ====
The presence of pneumatophores characterizes the subgroups Cystonectae and Physonectae. They are gas-filled floats that are located at the anterior end of the colonies in these species. They function to help the colonies maintain their orientation in water. In the Cystonectae subgroup, the pneumatophores have an additional function of assisting with flotation of the organisms. The siphonophores exhibiting the feature develop the structure in early larval development via invaginations of the flattened planula structure. Further observations of the siphonophore species Nanomia bijuga indicate that the pneumatophore feature potentially also functions to sense pressure changes and regulate chemotaxis in some species.

== Distribution and habitat ==
Currently, the World Register of Marine Species (WoRMS) identifies 175 species of siphonophores. They can differ greatly in terms of size and shape, which largely reflects the environment that they inhabit. Siphonophores are most often pelagic organisms, yet level species are benthic. Smaller, warm water siphonophores typically live in the epipelagic zone and use their tentacles to capture zooplankton and copepods. Larger siphonophores live in deeper waters, as they are generally longer and more fragile and must avoid strong currents. They mostly feed on larger prey, such as small fishes or crustaceans. The majority of siphonophores live in the deep sea and can be found in all of the oceans. Siphonophore species rarely only inhabit one location. Some species, however, can be confined to a specific range of depths or an area of the ocean.

== Behavior ==
=== Movement ===
Siphonophores use a method of locomotion similar to jet propulsion. A siphonophore is a complex aggregate colony made up of many nectophores, which are clonal individuals that form by budding and are genetically identical. Depending on where each individual nectophore is positioned within the siphonophore, their function differs. Colonial movement is determined by individual nectophores of all developmental stages. The smaller individuals are concentrated towards the top of the siphonophore, and their function is turning and adjusting the orientation of the colony. Individuals will get larger the older they are. The larger individuals are located at the base of the colony, and their main function is thrust propulsion. These larger individuals are important in attaining the maximum speed of the colony. Every individual is key to the movement of the aggregate colony, and understanding their organization may allow us to make advances in our own multi-jet propulsion vehicles. The colonial organization of siphonophores, particularly in Nanomia bijuga confers evolutionary advantages. A large number of concentrated individuals allows for redundancy. This means that even if some individual nectophores become functionally compromised, their role is bypassed so the colony as a whole is not negatively affected. The velum, a thin band of tissue surrounding the opening of the jet, also plays a role in swimming patterns, shown specifically through research done on the previous mentioned species N. bijuga. The velum becomes smaller and more circular during times of forward propulsion compared to a large velum that is seen during refill periods. Additionally, the position of the velum changes with swimming behaviors; the velum is curved downward in times of jetting, but during refill, the velum is moved back into the nectophore. The siphonophore Namonia bijuga also practices diel vertical migration, as it remains in the deep-sea during the day but rises during the night.

=== Predation and feeding ===
Siphonophores are predatory carnivores. Their diets consist of a variety of copepods, other small crustaceans, cnidarians, ctenophores, and small fish. Some siphonophores, such as Praya dubia, have been observed to feed on other species in the same order. Generally, the diets of strong swimming siphonophores consist of smaller prey, and the diets of weak swimming siphonophores consist of larger prey. Research has shown that specific diets vary even between different individuals of the same species depending on their particular environment. A majority of siphonophores have gastrozooids that have a characteristic tentacle attached to the base of the zooid. This structural feature functions in assisting the organisms in catching prey. Species with large gastrozooids are capable of consuming a broad range of prey sizes. In one species of siphonophore, Rosacea cymbiformis, digestive experiments showed that ingested prey remained in gastrozooids for at least 8 hours before egestion. Like other Cnidaria, many siphonophore species exhibit nematocyst stinging capsules on branches of their tentacles called tentilla. The nematocysts are arranged in dense batteries on the side of the tentilla. When the siphonophore encounters potential prey, their tentillum react to where the 30–50 cm (12–20 in) tentacles create a net by transforming their shape around the prey. The nematocysts then shoot millions of paralyzing, and sometimes fatal, toxin molecules at the trapped prey which is then transferred to the proper location for digestion. Some species of siphonophores use aggressive mimicry by using bioluminescent light so the prey cannot properly identify the predator.

There are four types of nematocysts in siphonophore tentilla: heteronemes, haplonemes, desmonemes, and rhopalonemes. Heteronemes are the largest nematocysts and are spines on a shaft close to tubules attached to the center of the siphonophore. Haplonemes have open-tipped tubules with spines, but no distinct shaft. This is the most common nematocyst among siphonophores. Desmonemes do not have spines but instead there are adhesive properties on the tubules to hold onto prey. Rhopalonemes are nematocysts with wide tubules for prey.

Due to the scarcity of food in the deep sea environment, a majority of siphonophore species function in a sit-and-wait tactic for food. The gelatinous body plan allows for flexibility when catching prey, but the gelatinous adaptations are based on habitat. They swim around waiting for their long tentacles to encounter prey. In addition, siphonophores in a group denoted Erenna have the ability to generate bioluminescence and red fluorescence while its tentilla twitches in a way to mimic motions of small crustaceans and copepods. These actions entice the prey to move closer to the siphonophore, allowing it to trap and digest it. The Siphonophore Apolemia uvaria has the ability to break into small fragments to break into fish cages for food.

Predators of Siphonophores include narcomedusae, gastropods, other siphonophores, and large fish such as Mola mola. Although lacking brains, certain species such as Hippopodius have been observed to react to tactile stimulation by contracting their gonophores into a central space protected by their nectophores, in a seemingly defensive maneuver called "crumpling." This species then proceeds to undergo "blanching," and emit a startlingly bright light. Nanomia, among other siphonophore species, can move both forward and backwards to escape a stimulus from the opposite side, using their nectophores for propulsion. While there are few observations of defensive behavior in situ, it is argued that these strategies help siphonophores evade predators.

=== Reproduction ===
The modes of reproduction for siphonophores vary among the different species, and to this day, several modes remain unknown. Generally, a single zygote begins the formation of a colony of zooids. The fertilized egg matures into a protozooid, which initiates the budding process and creation of a new zooid. This process repeats until a colony of zooids forms around the central stalk. In contrast, several species reproduce using polyps. Polyps can hold eggs and/or sperm and can be released into the water from the posterior end of the siphonophore. The polyps may then be fertilized outside of the organism.

Siphonophores use the gonophore organ to make their reproductive gametes. Gonophores are either male or female; however, the types of gonophores in a colony can vary among species. Species are characterized as monoecious or dioecious based on their gonophores. Monoecious species contain male and female gonophores in a single zooid colony, whereas dioecious species harbor male and female gonophores separately in different colonies of zooids.

Some siphonophore species within the Calycophorae clade release eudoxids, which are zooid clusters, instead of reproduction through gonophore organs. There is limited research on the mechanistic release of eudoxid fragments for reproduction, and studies are determining whether to consider them as clustered communities or individuals. Recent research has identified eudoxid tissue remodeling before release by a specified muscle, as well as a dispersal mechanism that temporarily alters siphonophore buoyancy.

=== Bioluminescence ===
Nearly all siphonophores have bioluminescent capabilities. Since these organisms are extremely fragile, they are rarely observed alive. Bioluminescence in siphonophores has been thought to have evolved as a defense mechanism. Siphonophores of the deep-sea genus Erenna (found at depths between 1,600–2,300 metres or 5,200–7,500 feet) are thought to use their bioluminescent capability for offense too, as a lure to attract fish. This genus is one of the few to prey on fish rather than crustaceans. The bioluminescent organs, called tentilla, on these non-visual individuals emit red fluorescence along with a rhythmic flicking pattern, which attracts prey as it resembles smaller organisms such as zooplankton and copepods. Thus, it has been concluded that they use luminescence as a lure to attract prey. Some research indicates that deep-sea organisms can not detect long wavelengths, and red light has a long wavelength of 680 nm. If this is the case, then fish are not lured by Erenna, and there must be another explanation. However, the deep-sea remains largely unexplored and red light sensitivity in fish such as Cyclothone and the deep myctophid fish should not be discarded.

Bioluminescent lures are found in many different species of siphonophores, and are used for a variety of reasons. Species such as Agalma okenii, Athorybia rosacea, Athorybia lucida, and Lychnafalma utricularia use their lures as a mimicry device to attract prey. A. rosacea mimic fish larvae, A. lucida are thought to mimic larvacean houses, and L. utricularia mimic hydromedusa. The species Resomia ornicephala uses their green and blue fluorescing tentilla to attract krill, helping them to outcompete other organisms that are hunting for the same prey. Erenna sirena uses bioluminescent lures surrounded by red fluorescence to attract prey and possibly mimic a fish from the Cyclothone genus. Their prey is lured in through a unique flicking behavior associated with the tentilla. When young, the tentilla of organisms in the Erenna genus contain only bioluminescent tissue, but, as the organism ages, red fluorescent material is also present in these tissues.

== Taxonomy ==
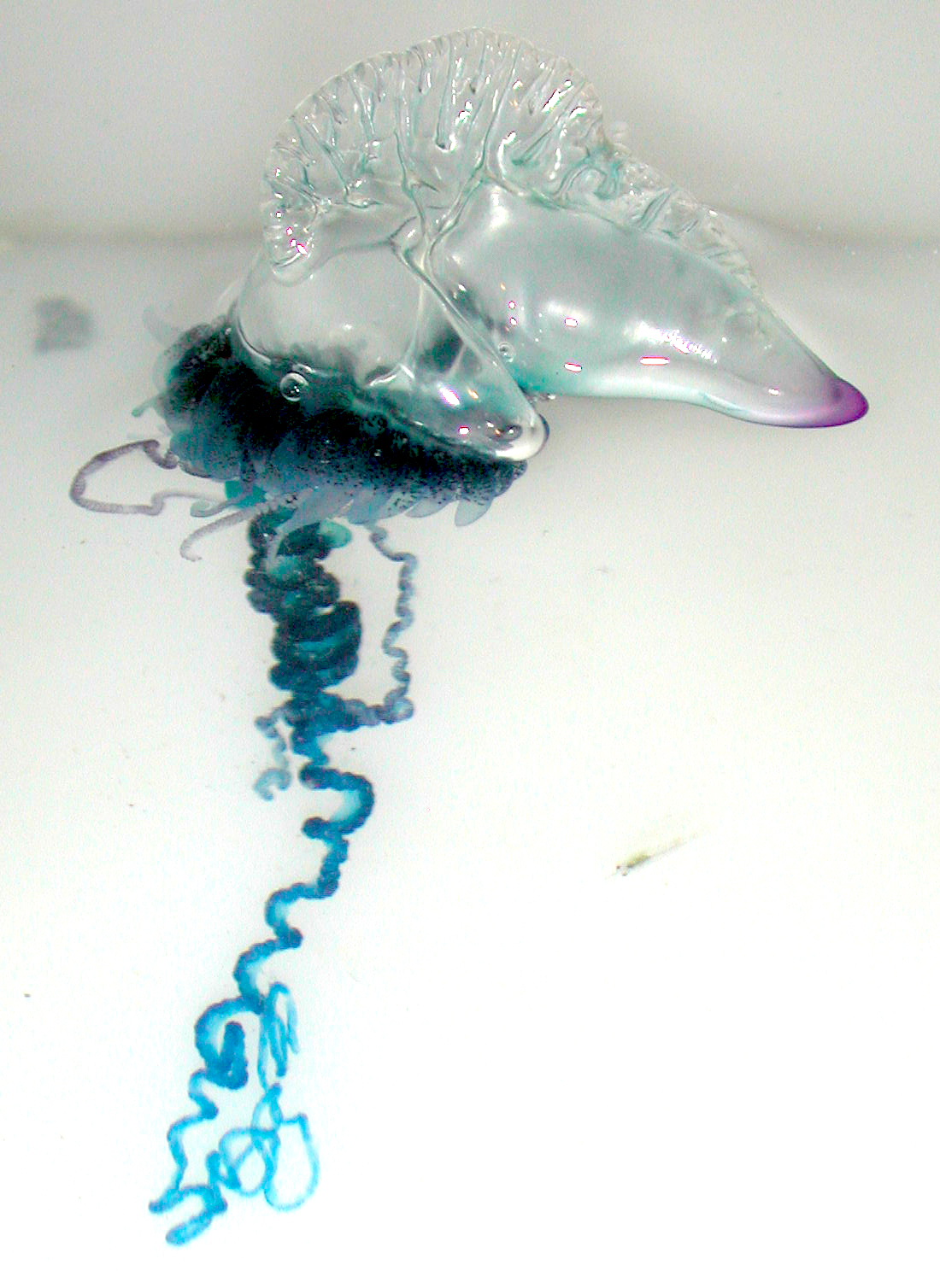
Portuguese man o' war (Physalia physalis)

=== History ===
Video taken at a depth of 612 metres of the siphonophore Nanomia bijuga

Carl Linnaeus described the first siphonophore, the Portuguese man o' war, in 1758. The discovery rate of siphonophore species was slow in the 18th century, as only four additional species were found. During the 19th century, 56 new species were observed due to research voyages conducted by European powers. The majority of new species found during this time period were collected in coastal, surface waters. During the HMS Challenger expedition in the early to mid 1870s, various species of siphonophores were collected. Ernst Haeckel attempted to conduct a write up of all of the species of siphonophores collected on this expedition. He introduced 46 "new species"; however, his work was heavily critiqued because some of the species that he identified were eventually found not to be siphonophores. Nonetheless, some of his descriptions and figures are considered useful by modern biologists. A rate of about 10 new species discoveries per decade was observed during the 20th century. Considered the most important researcher of siphonophores, A. K. Totton introduced 23 new species of siphonophores during the mid-20th century.

On April 6, 2020, the Schmidt Ocean Institute announced the discovery of a giant Apolemia siphonophore in submarine canyons near Ningaloo Coast, measuring 15 m (49 ft) diameter with a ring approximately 47 m (154 ft) long, possibly the largest siphonophore, and longest animal, ever recorded. Another notable recent discovery occurred in early 2025, when a team led by researchers at Yale University, the University of New South Wales, and Griffith University determined that the Portuguese man o'war is actually at least four distinct species. The discovery has implications for scientists' understanding of open-ocean biodiversity, and encourages further research into understanding what caused and maintained this genetic variation.

=== Modern taxonomy ===
Siphonophores are classified into the phylum Cnidaria and the class Hydrozoa. The phylogenetic relationships of siphonophores have been of great interest due to the high variability of the organization of their polyp colonies and medusae. Once believed to be a highly distinct group, larval similarities and morphological features have led researchers to believe that siphonophores had evolved from simpler colonial hydrozoans similar to those in the orders Anthoathecata and Leptothecata. Consequently, they are now united with these in the subclass Hydroidolina.

Early analysis divided siphonophores into three main subgroups based on the presence or the absence of two different traits: swimming bells (nectophores) and floats (pneumatophores). The subgroups consisted of Cystonectae, Physonectae, and Calycorphores. Cystonectae had pneumatophores, Calycophores had nectophores, and Physonectae had both. Eukaryotic nuclear small subunit ribosomal gene 18S, eukaryotic mitochondrial large subunit ribosomal gene 16S, and transcriptome analyses further support the phylogenetic division of Siphonophorae into two main clades: Cystonectae and Codonophora. Suborders within Codonophora include Physonectae (consisting of the clades Calycophorae and Euphysonectae), Pyrostephidae, and Apolemiidae.

- Suborder Calycophorae
  - Abylidae Agassiz, 1862
  - Clausophyidae Totton, 1965
  - Diphyidae Quoy & Gaimard, 1827
  - Hippopodiidae Kölliker, 1853
  - Prayidae Kölliker, 1853
  - Sphaeronectidae Huxley, 1859
  - Tottonophyidae Pugh, Dunn & Haddock, 2018
- Suborder Cystonectae
  - Physaliidae Brandt, 1835
  - Rhizophysidae Brandt, 1835
- Suborder Physonectae
  - Agalmatidae Brandt, 1834
  - Apolemiidae Huxley, 1859
  - Cordagalmatidae Pugh, 2016
  - Erennidae Pugh, 2001
  - Forskaliidae Haeckel, 1888
  - Physophoridae Eschscholtz, 1829
  - Pyrostephidae Moser, 1925
  - Resomiidae Pugh, 2006
  - Rhodaliidae Haeckel, 1888
  - Stephanomiidae Huxley, 1859

== Research challenges ==
For siphonophores, research has been limited. The organisms are gelatinous and fragile, making it difficult for researchers to obtain for sampling. Many siphonophores reside in the mesopelagic and bathypelagic zones, where many remotely operated vehicles (ROVs) and submersibles search to observe and sample these creatures. However, most colonies are destroyed during collections and because of this, there is a lack of preserved specimens for study. Most species of siphonophores are sampled through in situ observations, contributing to the gaps in knowledge about siphonophores and underrepresentation in species records because of sampling bias.

Molecular phylogenetics has helped address some of the inequalities by using nuclear and mitochondrial gene sequences. Most of these scientific studies have provided more insight into the evolution of specialized zooids within colonies. Additionally, genomic analyses have used transcriptome datasets to improve phylogenetic resolution, allowing scientists and researchers to reconstruct patterns in evolutionary traits like the organization of colonies and the tentilla feeding structure.

Using direct observation from submersibles and underwater imaging have also greatly helped knowledge of siphonophore ecology and behavior. The Bathyphysa conifera has been directly observed to have active locomotion though contracting and expanding their stem, a habit uniquely different from common methods of drifting passively with ocean currents. The manefish has been directly observed to associate with the Bathyphysa conifera, gaining shelter and access to food leftovers from the colony.
