= List of marine cnidarians of South Africa =

List of saltwater species that form a part of the cnidarian fauna of South Africa

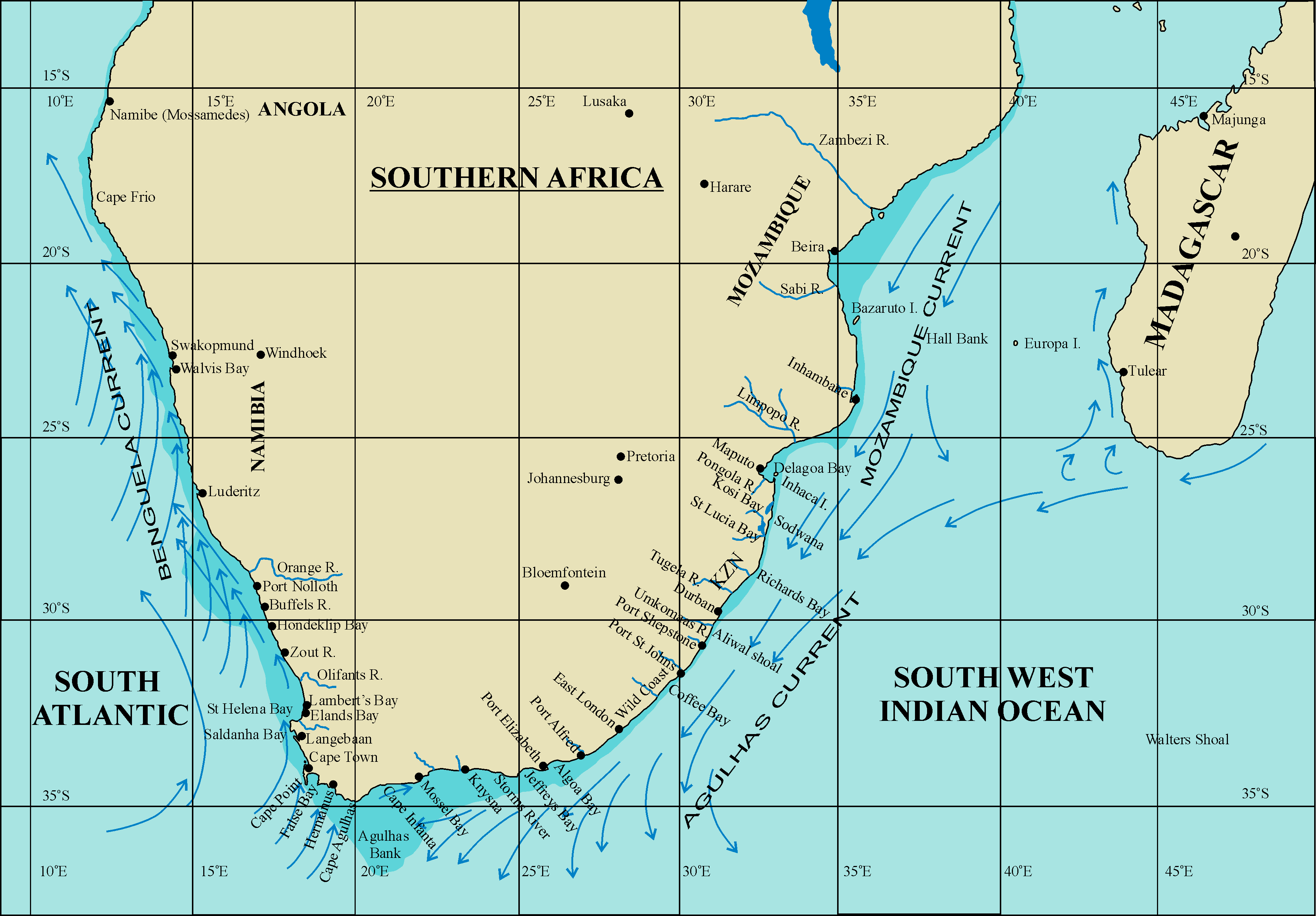
Map of the Southern African coastline showing some of the landmarks referred to in species range statements

The list of marine cnidarians of South Africa is a list of saltwater species that form a part of the cnidarian (Phylum Cnidaria) fauna of South Africa. This list does not include the freshwater cnidarians. The list follows the SANBI listing on iNaturalist, and does not always agree with WoRMS for distribution.

Cnidaria (/nɪˈdɛəriə, naɪ-/ nih-DAIR-ee-ə, ny-) is a phylum under kingdom Animalia containing over 11,000 species of aquatic invertebrates found both in freshwater and marine environments (predominantly the latter), including jellyfish, hydroids, sea anemones, corals and some of the smallest marine parasites. Their distinguishing features are an uncentralized nervous system distributed throughout a gelatinous body and the presence of cnidocytes or cnidoblasts, specialized cells with ejectable organelles used mainly for envenomation and capturing prey. Their bodies consist of mesoglea, a non-living, jelly-like substance, sandwiched between two layers of epithelium that are mostly one cell thick. Many cnidarian species can reproduce both sexually and asexually.

Cnidarians mostly have two basic body forms: swimming medusae and sessile polyps, both of which are radially symmetrical with mouths surrounded by tentacles that bear cnidocytes, which are specialized stinging cells used to capture prey. Both forms have a single orifice and body cavity that are used for digestion and respiration. Many cnidarian species produce colonies that are single organisms composed of medusa-like or polyp-like zooids, or both (hence they are trimorphic). Cnidarians' activities are coordinated by a decentralized nerve net and simple receptors. Cnidarians also have rhopalia, which are involved in gravity sensing and sometimes chemoreception. Several free-swimming species of Cubozoa and Scyphozoa possess balance-sensing statocysts, and some have simple eyes. Not all cnidarians reproduce sexually, but many species have complex life cycles of asexual polyp stages and sexual medusae stages. Some, however, omit either the polyp or the medusa stage, and the parasitic classes evolved to have neither form.

Cnidarians were formerly grouped with ctenophores, also known as comb jellies, in the phylum Coelenterata, but increasing awareness of their differences caused them to be placed in separate phyla. Most cnidarians are classified into four main groups: the almost wholly sessile Anthozoa (sea anemones, corals, sea pens); swimming Scyphozoa (jellyfish); Cubozoa (box jellies); and Hydrozoa (a diverse group that includes all the freshwater cnidarians as well as many marine forms, and which has both sessile members, such as Hydra, and colonial swimmers (such as the Portuguese man o' war)). Staurozoa have recently been recognised as a class in their own right rather than a sub-group of Scyphozoa, and the highly derived parasitic Myxozoa and Polypodiozoa were firmly recognized as cnidarians only in 2007.

Most cnidarians prey on organisms ranging in size from plankton to animals several times larger than themselves, but many obtain much of their nutrition from symbiotic dinoflagellates, and a few are parasites. Many are preyed on by other animals including starfish, sea slugs, fish, turtles, and even other cnidarians. Many scleractinian corals—which form the structural foundation for coral reefs—possess polyps that are filled with symbiotic photo-synthetic zooxanthellae. While reef-forming corals are almost entirely restricted to warm and shallow marine waters, other cnidarians can be found at great depths, in polar regions, and in freshwater.

Cnidarians are a very ancient phylum, with fossils having been found in rocks formed about 580 million years ago during the Ediacaran period, preceding the Cambrian Explosion. Other fossils show that corals may have been present shortly before 490 million years ago and diversified a few million years later. Molecular clock analysis of mitochondrial genes suggests an even older age for the crown group of cnidarians, estimated around 741 million years ago, almost 200 million years before the Cambrian period, as well as before any fossils. Recent phylogenetic analyses support monophyly of cnidarians, as well as the position of cnidarians as the sister group of bilaterians. (Full article...)

== Class Anthozoa, subclass Hexacorallia ==
=== Order Actiniaria, suborder Endocoelantheae ===
==== Family Halcuriidae ====
- Halcurias capensis Carlgren, 1928

=== Suborder Nynantheae, infraorder Athenaria ===
==== Family Edwardsiidae ====
- Edwardsia capensis Carlgren, 1938

==== Family Halcampidae ====
- Halcampa capensis Carlgren, 1938
- Halcampaster teres Carlgren, 1938
- Halianthella annularis Carlgren, 1938 – Brooding anemone

==== Family Haloclavidae ====
- Haloclava capensis (Verrill, 1865)

=== Infraorder Thenaria ===
==== Superfamily Acontiaria, family Acontiophoridae ====
- Acontiophorum mortenseni Carlgren, 1938

==== Family Aiptasiidae ====
- Aiptasia parva Carlgren, 1938 – Trumpet anemone

==== Family Hormathiidae ====
- Actinauge granulata Carlgren, 1928
- Amphianthus capensis Carlgren, 1928
- Amphianthus laevis Carlgren, 1938
- Amphianthus natalensis Carlgren, 1938
- Calliactis algoaensis Carlgren, 1938
- Calliactis polypus (Forsskål, 1775) Symbiotic anemone
- Phelliactis algoaensis Carlgren, 1928
- Phelliactis capensis Carlgren, 1938

==== Family Isophellidae ====
- Isophellia algoaensis Carlgren, 1928
- Litophellia octoradiata Carlgren, 1938
- Telmatactis natalensis Carlgren, 1938

==== Family Nemanthidae ====
- Nemanthus nitidus (Wassilieff, 1908)

==== Family Sagartiidae ====
- Anthothoe chilensis (Lesson, 1830) – Striped anemone
- Anthothoe sp. – Square-mouth striped anemone
- Phellia aucklandica (Carlgren, 1924)
- Sagartia ornata (Holdsworth, 1855) – Rooted anemone

==== Superfamily Endomyaria, family Actiniidae ====
- Actinia mandelae – Plum anemone
- Anemonia natalensis Carlgren, 1938 – Natal anemone
- Anthopleura anneae Carlgren, 1940
- Anthopleura insignis Carlgren, 1940
- Anthopleura michaelseni (Pax, 1920) – Crevice anemone
- Anthostella stephensoni Carlgren, 1938 – Violet spotted anemone
- Anthostella sp. – Dwarf spotted anemone
- Bolocera kerguelensis Studer, 1879
- Bunodactis reynaudi (Milne Edwards, 1857) – Sandy anemone
- Bunodosoma capense (Lesson, 1830) – Knobbly anemone
- Entacmaea quadricolor (Leuckart in Rüppell & Leuckart, 1828) – Bubble-tip anemone
- Gyractis sesere (Haddon & Shackleton, 1893) – Colonial anemone
- Korsaranthus natalensis (Carlgren, 1938) – Candy-striped anemone
- Pseudactinia flagellifera (Hertwig, 1882) – False plum anemone
- Pseudactinia varia Carlgren, 1938
- Urticinopsis crassa Carlgren, 1938

==== Family Actinodendronidae ====
- Actinodendron hansingorum Carlgren, 1900

==== Family Aliciidae ====
- Alicia sansibarensis Carlgren, 1900

==== Family Condylanthidae ====
- Condylanthus magellanicus Carlgren, 1899

==== Family Liponematidae ====
- Liponema multiporum (Hertwig, 1882)

==== Family Stichodactylidae ====
- Heteractis aurora (Quoy & Gaimard, 1833)
- Heteractis magnifica (Quoy & Gaimard, 1833) – Giant anemone
- Stichodactyla mertensii Brandt, 1835

==== Superfamily Mesomyaria, family Actinostolidae ====
- Anthosactis capensis Carlgren, 1938
- Actinostola capensis (Carlgren, 1928)
- Isanthus capensis Carlgren, 1938 – Ring tentacle anemone

=== Suborder Ptychodacteae ===
==== Family Preactiidae ====
- Preactis millardae England in England & Robson, 1984 – Walking anemone, hedgehog anemone, sock anemone

==== Superfamily Actiniaria incertae sedis, family Metridiidae ====
- Metridium senile (Linnaeus, 1761) – Feather-duster anemone
- Metridium senile subsp. dianthus – (Not on WORMS)
- Metridium senile subsp. pallidus (Rawlinson, 1934)
- Metridium senile subsp. senile – (Not on WORMS)

=== Order Antipatharia ===
==== Family Antipathidae ====
- Antipathes sp. – Branched black coral
- Cirrhipathes sp. – Whip corals, Wire corals

=== Order Ceriantharia, suborder Spirularia ===
==== Family Cerianthidae ====
- Ceriantheopsis austroafricanus Molodtsova, Griffiths & Acuña, 2011 – Tube anemone
- Ceriantheopsis nikitai Molodtsova, 2001 – White tube anemone

=== Order Corallimorpharia ===
==== Family Corallimorphidae ====
- Corynactis annulata (Verrill, 1867) – Strawberry anemone

==== Family Discosomatidae ====
- Discosoma spp. – Elephant ear corals

=== Order Scleractinia ===
==== Family Acroporidae ====
- Acropora abrotanoides (Lamarck, 1816)
- Acropora aculeus (Dana, 1846)
- Acropora anthocercis (Brook, 1893)
- Acropora appressa (Ehrenberg, 1834) – nomen dubium
- Acropora arabensis Hodgson & Carpenter, 1995
- Acropora austera (Dana, 1846)
- Acropora branchi Riegl, 1995
- Acropora clathrata (Brook, 1891) – Staghorn coral
- Acropora donei Veron & Wallace, 1984
- Acropora florida (Dana, 1846)
- Acropora horrida (Dana, 1846)
- Acropora humilis (Dana, 1846)
- Acropora hyacinthus (Dana, 1846)
- Acropora latistella (Brook, 1892)
- Acropora millepora (Ehrenberg, 1834)
- Acropora nana (Studer, 1877)
- Acropora nasuta (Dana, 1846)
- Acropora natalensis Riegl, 1995
- Acropora sordiensis Riegl, 1995
- Acropora stoddarti Pillai & Scheer, 1976 – (unaccepted on WoRMS)
- Acropora tenuis (Dana, 1846)
- Acropora valida (Dana, 1846)
- Acropora verweyi Veron & Wallace, 1984
- Acropora spp. Staghorn corals
- Alveopora allingi Hoffmeister, 1925
- Alveopora spongiosa Dana, 1846
- Alveopora spp.
- Astreopora incrustans Bernard, 1896
- Astreopora listeri Bernard, 1896
- Astreopora myriophthalma (Lamarck, 1816) – Many eyed star coral
- Isopora palifera (Lamarck, 1816)
- Montipora aequituberculata Bernard, 1897 – pore coral
- Montipora danae Milne Edwards & Haime, 1851 – pore coral
- Montipora monasteriata (Forskål, 1775) – pore coral
- Montipora spongodes Bernard, 1897 – pore coral
- Montipora tuberculosa (Lamarck, 1816) – pore coral
- Montipora turgescens Bernard, 1897 – pore coral
- Montipora venosa (Ehrenberg, 1834) – pore coral
- Montipora verrucosa (Lamarck, 1816) – pore coral
- Montipora spp. Warty coral

==== Family Agariciidae ====
- Coeloseris mayeri Vaughan, 1918
- Gardineroseris planulata (Dana, 1846)
- Leptoseris explanata Yabe & Sugiyama, 1941 – Porcelain coral
- Leptoseris spp. – Plate coral
- Pachyseris speciosa (Dana, 1846) – Disc coral
- Pavona clavus (Dana, 1846)
- Pavona decussata (Dana, 1846) – Peacock coral
- Pavona explanulata (Lamarck, 1816)
- Pavona minuta Wells, 1954 – Leaf coral
- Pavona venosa (Ehrenberg, 1834)

==== Family Caryophylliidae ====
- Caryophyllia spp. – cup corals

==== Family Coscinaraeidae ====
- Anomastraea irregularis von Marenzeller, 1901 – Irregular honeycomb coral
- Coscinaraea columna (Dana, 1846) –
- Coscinaraea exesa (Dana, 1846)
- Coscinaraea monile Forskål, 1775
- Coscarinaea spp. – Brain corals
- Horastrea indica Pichon, 1971

==== Family Dendrophylliidae ====
- Balanophyllia (Balanophyllia) bonaespei van der Horst, 1938 – Cup coral
- Dendrophyllia robusta (Bourne, 1905) – Turret coral
- Tubastraea micranthus (Ehrenberg, 1834) – Green tree coral
- Turbinaria irregularis Bernard, 1896
- Turbinaria mesenterina (Lamarck, 1816) – Turbinate coral

==== Family Euphylliidae ====
- Galaxea fascicularis (Linnaeus, 1767) – Spiky coral
- Galaxea astreata (Lamarck, 1816) – Spiky coral
- Gyrosmilia interrupta (Ehrenberg, 1834) – Brain corals

==== Family Fungiidae ====
- Cycloseris costulata (Ortmann, 1889)
- Cycloseris cyclolites (Lamarck, 1815)
- Cycloseris distorta (Michelin, 1842)
- Cycloseris spp. Mushroom corals
- Halomitra pileus (Linnaeus, 1758) – Helmet coral
- Herpolitha limax (Esper, 1797)
- Herpolitha spp. – Mushroom corals
- Lobactis scutaria (Lamarck, 1801) – Mushroom coral syn. Fungia scutaria Lamarck, 1801
- Podabacia crustacea (Pallas, 1766)

==== Family Lobophylliidae ====
- Acanthastrea brevis Milne Edwards & Haime, 1849
- Acanthastrea echinata (Dana, 1846) – Spiny honeycomb coral
- Acanthastrea hemprichi (Ehrenberg, 1834)
- Acanthastrea ishigakiensis Veron, 1990
- Acanthastrea simplex (Crossland, 1848) (nomen dubium on WoRMS)
- Acanthastrea subechinata Veron, 2000
- Echinophyllia aspera (Ellis & Solander, 1786)
- Lobophyllia spp. – False brain corals
- Parascolymia vitiensis (Brüggemann, 1877)
- Symphyllia valenciennesii Milne Edwards & Haime – Brain corals

==== Family Merulinidae ====
- Astrea annuligera Milne Edwards & Haime, 1849 – false knob coral
- Astrea devantieri (Veron, 2000)
- Cyphastrea chalcidicum (Forskål, 1775)
- Cyphastrea serailia (Forskål, 1775)
- Dipsastraea danai (Milne Edwards, 1857)
- Dipsastraea favus (Forskål, 1775) – Knob coral
- Dipsastraea laxa (Klunzinger, 1879) – Knob coral
- Dipsastraea matthaii (Vaughan, 1918) – Knob coral
- Dipsastraea pallida (Dana, 1846) – Knob coral
- Dipsastraea rotumana (Gardiner, 1899) – Knob coral
- Dipsastraea speciosa (Dana, 1846) – Knob coral
- Dipsastraea vietnamensis (Veron, 2000)
- Echinopora forskaliana (Milne Edwards & Haime, 1849)
- Echinopora gemmacea (Lamarck, 1816)
- Echinopora hirsutissima Milne Edwards & Haime, 1849 – Prickly pored coral
- Favites abdita (Ellis & Solander, 1786) – larger star coral
- Favites acuticollis (Ortmann, 1889)
- Favites chinensis (Verrill, 1866)
- Favites complanata (Ehrenberg, 1834) – larger star coral
- Favites flexuosa Dana, 1846 – larger star coral
- Favites halicora (Ehrenberg, 1834) – larger star coral
- Favites pentagona (Esper, 1795) – larger star coral
- Favites russelli (Wells, 1954)
- Favites spinosa (Klunzinger, 1879)
- Favites vasta (Klunzinger, 1879)
- Favites spp. – Honeycomb corals
- Goniastrea edwardsi Chevalier, 1971
- Goniastrea pectinata (Ehrenberg, 1834)
- Goniastrea retiformis (Lamarck, 1816)
- Goniastrea stelligera (Dana, 1846) Favia stelligera (Dana, 1846)
- Goniastrea spp. – Honeycomb corals
- Hydnophora exesa (Pallas, 1766)
- Hydnophora microconos (Lamarck, 1816) – Small-coned coral
- Hydnophora pilosa Veron, 1985
- Leptoria phrygia (Ellis & Solander, 1786) – Least valley coral
- Oulophyllia crispa (Lamarck, 1816) – Brain coral
- Paramontastraea peresi (Faure & Pichon, 1978) – larger star coral
- Pectinia africana Veron, 2000
- Platygyra daedalea (Ellis & Solander, 1786) – Labyrinthine brain coral
- Platygyra sinensis (Milne Edwards & Haime, 1849)

==== Family Mussidae, subfamily Faviinae ====
- Favia spp. – False honeycomb corals

==== Family Plesiastreidae ====
- Plesiastrea versipora (Lamarck, 1816) – Star-like coral

==== Family Pocilloporidae ====
- Pocillopora damicornis (Linnaeus, 1758) – Knob-horned coral
- Pocillopora grandis Dana, 1846
- Pocillopora verrucosa (Ellis & Solander, 1786) – Knob-horned coral
- Seriatopora caliendrum Ehrenberg, 1834
- Stylophora pistillata Esper, 1797 – Tramp coral

==== Family Poritidae ====
- Goniopora djiboutiensis Vaughan, 1907 – Daisy coral
- Goniopora planulata (Ehrenberg, 1834)
- Goniopora somaliensis Vaughan, 1907 – anemone coral
- Porites lichen Dana, 1846
- Porites lutea Quoy & Gaimard, 1833
- Porites solida (Forskål, 1775)
- Porites spp. – Porous corals

==== Family Psammocoridae ====
- Psammocora haimiana Milne Edwards & Haime, 1851

==== Scleractinia incertae sedis ====
- Blastomussa merleti (Wells, 1961)

==== Scleractinia incertae sedis ====
- Leptastrea purpurea (Dana, 1846) – Crust coral

=== Order Zoantharia, suborder Brachycnemina ===
==== Family Sphenopidae ====
- Palythoa natalensis Carlgren, 1938 – Squat sandy zoanthid
- Palythoa nelliae Pax, 1935 – Columnar sandy zoanthid
- Palythoa tuberculosa (Esper, 1791) – Leathery zoanthid

==== Family Zoanthidae ====
- Isaurus tuberculatus Gray, 1828 – Knobbly zoanthid
- Zoanthus durbanensis Carlgren – Durban zoanthid
- Zoanthus eyrei ? 2O
- Zoanthus natalensis Carlgen – Green zoanthid
- Zoanthus parvus ? – Not in WoRMS
- Zoanthus sansibaricus Carlgren, 1900 – Violet zoanthid check date

=== Suborder Macrocnemina ===
==== Family Parazoanthidae ====
- Isozoanthus capensis Carlgren, 1938 – Cape zoanthid
- Parazoanthus sp. – Sponge zoanthid

== Subclass Octocorallia ==
=== Order Alcyonacea, suborder Alcyoniina ===
==== Family Alcyoniidae ====
- Acrophytum claviger Hickson, 1900
- Alcyonium distinctum Williams, 1988
- Alcyonium elegans (Kükenthal, 1902)
- Alcyonium fauri Studer, 1910 – Purple soft coral
- Alcyonium foliatum J. S. Thomson, 1921
- Alcyonium reptans Kükenthal, 1906
- Alcyonium roseum (Tixier-Durivault, 1954)
- Alcyonium wilsoni (J.S. Thomson, 1921)
- Aldersladum sodwanum (Benayahu, 1993)
- Anthomastus giganteus Tixier-Durivault, 1954
- Anthomastus hicksoni Bock, 1938
- Cladiella australis (Macfadyen, 1936)
- Cladiella kashmani Benayahu & Schleyer, 1996 – Blanching soft coral
- Cladiella krempfi (Hickson, 1919)
- Cladiella madagascarensis (Tixier-Durivault, 1944)
- Dimorphophyton mutabiliforme (Williams, 1988)
- Eleutherobia studeri (J.S. Thomson, 1910)
- Eleutherobia variabile (Thomson, 1921) – Variable soft coral
- Eleutherobia vinadigitaria Williams & Little, 2001
- Lampophyton planiceps (Williams, 1986)
- Lobophytum crassum von Marenzeller, 1886 – Dimorphic soft coral
- Lobophytum crebliplicatum von Marenzeller, 1886
- Lobophytum depressum Tixier-Durivault, 1966
- Lobophytum latilobatum Verseveldt, 1971
- Lobophytum patulum Tixier-Durivault, 1956
- Lobophytum venustum Tixier-durivault, 1957 – Dimorphic soft coral
- Malacacanthus capensis (Hickson, 1900) – Sunburst soft coral
- Minabea spp.
- Sarcophyton ehrenbergi (v. Marenzeller, 1886)
- Sarcophyton flexuosum Tixier-Durivault, 1966
- Sarcophyton glaucum (Quoy & Gaimard, 1833)
- Sarcophyton infundibuliforme Tixier-Durivault, 1958
- Sarcophyton trocheliophorum von Marenzeller, 1886
- Sarcophyton spp. – Mushroom soft corals
- Sinularia abrubta Tixier-Durivault, 1970 – Abrupt leather-coral
- Sinularia brassica May, 1898 – Cabbage leather-coral
- Sinularia erecta Tixier-Durivault, 1945
- Sinularia firma Tixier-Durivault, 1970
- Sinularia gardineri (Pratt, 1903)
- Sinularia gravis Tixier-Durivault, 1970 – Lobed leather-coral
- Sinularia gyrosa (Klunzinger, 1877)
- Sinularia heterospiculata Verseveldt, 1970 – Spiky leather-coral
- Sinularia hirta (Pratt, 1903)
- Sinularia leptoclados (Ehrenberg, 1834) – Finger-branched leather-coral
- Sinularia muralis (May, 1899)
- Sinularia notanda Tixier-Durivault, 1966
- Sinularia polydactyla (Eherenberg, 1834)(Madagascar, seychelles)
- Sinularia querciformis (Pratt, 1903)
- Sinularia schleyeri Benayahu, 1993
- Sinularia triangula Tixier-Durivault, 1970
- Sinularia variabilis Tixier-Durivault, 1945
- Verseveldtia bucciniforme Williams, 1990
- Verseveldtia trochiforme (Hickson, 1900)

==== Family Nephtheidae ====
- Capnella susanae Williams, 1988
- Capnella thyrsoidea (Verrill, 1865) – Cauliflower soft coral
- Dendronephthya inhacaensis Verseveldt, 1960 – Thistle soft corals
- Dendronephthya mutabilis Tixier-Durivault & Prevor, 1962 – Thistle soft corals
- Dendronephthya spp. – Thistle soft corals
- Eunephthya celata McFadden & van Ofwegen, 2012
- Eunephthya ericius McFadden & van Ofwegen, 2012
- Eunephthya granulata McFadden & van Ofwegen, 2012
- Eunephthya shirleyae McFadden & van Ofwegen, 2012
- Eunephthya thyrsoidea Verrill, 1869
- Litophyton liltvedi Verseveldt & Williams, 1988
- Nephthea sp.
- Scleronephthya spp.
- Stereonephthya spp.

==== Family Nidaliidae ====
- Pieterfaurea equicalceola Williams, 2000
- Pieterfaurea khoisaniana (Williams, 1988)
- Pieterfaurea lampas Williams, 2000
- Pieterfaurea sinuosa Williams, 2000
- Pieterfaurea unilobata (J.S. Thomson, 1921)
- Siphonogorgia sp.

==== Family Parasphaerascleridae ====
- Parasphaerasclera aurea (Benayahu & Schleyer, 1995) – Golden soft coral
- Parasphaerasclera morifera (Tixier-Durivault, 1954)
- Parasphaerasclera rotifera (Thomson, 1910)
- Parasphaerasclera valdiviae (Kukenthal, 1906) – Valdivian soft coral

==== Family Xeniidae ====
- Anthelia glauca Lamarck, 1816
- Cespitularia coerula May, 1898
- Heteroxenia elisabethae Kölliker, 1874
- Heteroxenia fuscescens (Ehrenberg, 1834) – Pulsating soft coral
- Heteroxenia membranacea Schenk, 1896
- Heteroxenia rigida (May, 1899)
- Sansibia flava (May, 1899) – Blue soft coral
- Sympodium caeruleum Ehrenberg, 1834
- Xenia crassa Schenk, 1896 – Stalked soft coral
- Xenia dayi Tixier-Durivault, 1959
- Xenia florida (Lesson, 1826)
- Xenia kukenthali Roxas, 1933
- Xenia umbellata Lamarck, 1816
- Xenia viridis Schenk, 1896

=== Order Calcaxonia ===
==== Family Chrysogorgiidae ====
- Chrysogorgia sp.
- Helicogorgia capensis (Simpson, 1910)
- Helicogorgia flagellata (Simpson, 1910)
- Helicogorgia spiralis (Hickson, 1904)
- Helicogorgia squamifera (Kükenthal, 1919)
- Radicipes sp.
- Xenogorgia sciurus Bayer & Muzik, 1976

==== Family Ellisellidae ====
- Junceella spp.

==== Family Isididae ====
- Acanella sp.
- Chathamisis ramosa (Hickson, 1904)
- Keratoisis sp.

==== Family Primnoidae ====
- Callogorgia sp.
- Calyptrophora sp.
- Narella gilchristi (Thomson, 1911)
- Primnoella sp.
- Primnoeides sp.
- Thouarella (Thouarella) hicksoni Thomson, J.S., 1911

=== Subrder Holaxonia ===
==== Family Acanthogorgiidae ====
- Acanthogorgia spp.
- Anthogorgia sp.

==== Family Gorgoniidae ====
- Eunicella albicans (Kölliker, 1865) – Flagellar sea fan
- Eunicella papillosa (Esper, 1797) – Nippled sea fan
- Eunicella tricoronata Velimirov, 1971 – Sinuous sea fan
- Leptogorgia barnardi Stiasny, 1940
- Leptogorgia capensis (Hickson, 1900)
- Leptogorgia gilchristi (Hickson, 1904)
- Leptogorgia abietina Kükenthal, 1919
- Leptogorgia lütkeni (Wright & Studer, 1889)
- Leptogorgia palma (Pallas, 1766) – Palmate sea fan
- Leptogorgia pusilla Kükenthal, 1919
- Leptogorgia rigida Verrill, 1864
- Leptogorgia tenuissima Kükenthal, 1919

==== Family Keroeididae ====
- Ideogorgia capensis (Simpson, 1910)

==== Family Plexauridae ====
- Acanthomuricea pulchra (J.S. Thomson, 1911)
- Astromuricea fusca (J.S. Thomson, 1911)
- Echinomuricea spp.
- Euplexaura spp.
- Menella sp.
- Rumphella aggregata (Nutting, 1910) – Bushy whip corals
- Rumphella sp. Ropy sea fan
- Trichogorgia capensis (Hickson, 1904)
- Trichogorgia flexilis Hickson, 1904

=== Suborder Scleraxonia ===
==== Family Anthothelidae ====
- Anthothela parviflora Thomson, 1917
- Diodogorgia capensis (Thomson, 1911)
- Homophyton verrucosum (Möbius, 1861) – Warty sea fan, Gorgonian twig coral

==== Subfamily Melithaeinae ====
- Melithaea capensis (Studer, 1878)
- Melithaea coccinea (Ellis & Solander, 1786)
- Melithaea furcata (Thomson, 1916)
- Melithaea rubra (Esper, 1789) – Multicolour sea fan
- Melithaea singularis (Thomson, 1916)
- Melithaea trilineata (Thomson, 1917)
- Melithaea valdiviae (Kükenthal, 1908)
- Melithaea wrighti Reijnen, McFadden, Hermanlimianto & van Ofwegen, 2014

=== Suborder Stolonifera ===
==== Family Clavulariidae ====
- Bathytelesto tubuliporoides Williams, 1989
- Clavularia cylindrica Wright & Studer, 1889
- Clavularia diademata Broch, 1939
- Clavularia elongata Wright & Studer, 1889 (dubious)
- Clavularia parva Tixier-Durivault, 1964
- Clavularia sp.
- Scyphopodium ingolfi (Madsen, 1944)
- Sarcodictyon sp.
- Scleranthelia thomsoni Williams, 1987
- Telesto arborea Wright & Studer, 1889 – Cave-dwelling soft coral
- Telestula sp.

==== Family Tubiporidae ====
- Tubipora musica Linnaeus, 1758 – Organ-pipe coral

=== Order Pennatulacea ===
==== Family Chunellidae ====
- Amphiacme abyssorum (Kükenthal, 1902)
- Chunella gracillima Kükenthal, 1902

==== Family Echinoptilidae ====
- Actinoptilum molle (Kükenthal, 1902) – Purple sea pen, Cylindrical sea pen
- Echinoptilum echinatum (Kükenthal, 1910)
- Echinoptilum macintoshii Hubrecht, 1885

==== Family Scleroptilidae ====
- Calibelemnon sp.
- Scleroptilum sp.

=== Suborder Sessiliflorae ===
==== Family Anthoptilidae ====
- Anthoptilum grandiflorum (Verrill, 1879)

==== Family Funiculinidae ====
- Funiculina quadrangularis (Pallas, 1766)

==== Family Kophobelemnidae ====
- Kophobelemnon stelliferum (Müller, 1776)
- Kophobelemnon sp.

==== Family Protoptilidae ====
- Distichoptilum gracile Verrill, 1882

==== Family Umbellulidae ====
- Umbellula lindahli Kölliker, 1875
- Umbellula thomsoni Kölliker, 1874

==== Family Veretillidae ====
- Cavernulina sp.
- Cavernularia dayi Tixier-Durivault, 1954
- Cavernularia elegans (Herklots, 1858)
- Lituaria valenciennesi d'Hondt, 1984
- Veretillum cynomorum (Pallas, 1766)
- Veretillum leloupi Tixier-Durivault, 1960

=== suborder Subsessiliflorae ===
==== Family Halipteridae ====
- Halipteris africana (Studer, 1878)
- Halipteris spp.

==== Family Pennatulidae ====
- Pennatula inflata Kükenthal, 1910
- Pteroeides isosceles J.S. Thomson, 1915 – Rotund sea pen
- Pteroeides spp.

==== Family Virgulariidae ====
- Scytaliopsis djiboutiensis Gravier, 1906
- Virgularia gustaviana (Herklots, 1863) – Elegant sea pen
- Virgularia mirabilis (Müller, 1776)
- Virgularia schultzei Kükenthal, 1910 – Feathery sea pen

== Class Cubozoa ==
=== Order Carybdeida ===
==== Family Carybdeidae ====
- Carybdea branchi Gershwin & Gibbons, 2009 – Box jellyfish

==== Family Tamoyidae ====
- Tamoya haplonema F. Müller, 1859

=== Order Chirodropida ===
==== Family Chirodropidae ====
- Chirodropus gorilla Haeckel, 1880
- Chirodropus palmatus Haeckel, 1880

==== Family Chiropsalmidae ====
- Chiropsalmus sp.

== Class Hydrozoa, subclass Hydroidolina ==
=== Order Anthoathecata, suborder Aplanulata ===
==== Family Candelabridae ====
- Candelabrum capensis (Manton, 1940)
- Candelabrum tentaculatum (Millard, 1966)
- Monocoryne minor Millard, 1966 – Agulhas bank

==== Family Corymorphidae ====
- Branchiocerianthus imperator (Allman, 1888)
- Corymorpha abaxialis (Kramp, 1962)
- Corymorpha bigelowi (Maas, 1905)
- Corymorpha forbesii (Mayer, 1894)
- Corymorpha furcata (Kramp, 1948)
- Corymorpha gracilis (Brooks, 1883)
- Euphysa aurata Forbes, 1848
- Euphysa brevia (Uchida, 1947)
- Euphysa tetrabrachia Bigelow, 1904
- Euphysilla pyramidata Kramp, 1955
- Paragotoea bathybia Kramp, 1942

==== Family Tubulariidae ====
- Ectopleura betheris (Warren, 1908)
- Ectopleura crocea (Agassiz, 1862)
- Ectopleura dumortieri (Van Beneden, 1844)
- Ectopleura larynx (Ellis & Solander, 1786)
- Hybocodon unicus (Browne, 1902)
- Zyzzyzus warreni Calder, 1988

=== Suborder Capitata ===
==== Family Asyncorynidae ====
- Asyncoryne ryniensis Warren, 1908

==== Family Cladocorynidae ====
- Cladocoryne floccosa Rotch, 1871

==== Family Family Cladonematidae ====
- Staurocladia vallentini (Browne, 1902)

==== Family Corynidae ====
- Bicorona elegans Millard, 1966
- Codonium proliferum (Forbes, 1848)
- Coryne eximia Allman, 1859
- Coryne gracilis (Browne, 1902)
- Coryne inabai Not found anywhere
- Coryne nutans Allman, 1872 – (taxon inquirendum)
- Coryne producta Cannot identify this one
- Coryne pusilla Gaertner, 1774
- Slabberia halterata Forbes, 1846
- Stauridiosarsia baukalion (Pagès, Gili & Bouillon, 1992)syn. Dipurena baukalion
- Stauridiosarsia ophiogaster (Haeckel, 1879)syn. Dipurena ophiogaster
- Sarsia tubulosa (M. Sars, 1835)

==== Family Halimedusidae ====
- Urashimea globosa Kishinouye, 1910

==== Family Milleporidae ====
- Millepora tenella Esper, 1795 – Fire coral? – taxon inquirendum
- Millepora tenera Boschma, 1949 – Fire coral?
- Millepora platyphylla Hemprich & Ehrenberg, 1834

==== Family Moerisiidae ====
- Moerisia inkermanica Paltschikowa-Osroumowa, 1925

==== Family Pennariidae ====
- Pennaria disticha Goldfuss, 1820
- Pennaria pauper Kramp, 1959 – taxon inquirendum

==== Family Porpitidae ====
- Porpita porpita (Linnaeus, 1758) – Porpita pacifica
- Velella velella (Linnaeus, 1758)

==== Family Solanderiidae ====
- Solanderia fusca (Gray, 1868)
- Solanderia procumbens (Carter, 1873)
- Solanderia secunda (Inaba, 1892)

==== Family Sphaerocorynidae ====
- Sphaerocoryne bedoti Pictet, 1893 – Natal and Mozambique, India, Madagascar, Queensland and Japan

==== Family Teissieridae ====
- Teissiera medusifera Bouillon, 1978

==== Family Zancleidae ====
- Zanclea sp.

==== Family Zancleopsidae ====
- Zancleopsis gotoi (Uchida, 1927)
- Zancleopsis spp.

==== Capitata incertae sedis ====
- Rhabdoon singulare Keferstein & Ehlers, 1861

==== Capitata incertae sedis ====
- Plotocnide incertae (Linko, 1900) – taxon inquirendum

==== Capitata incertae sedis ====
- Cnidocodon leopoldi Bouillon, 1978

=== Suborder Filifera ===
==== Family Bougainvilliidae ====
- Bimeria fluminalis Annandale, 1915
- Bimeria rigida Warren, 1919
- Bimeria vestita Wright, 1859
- Bougainvillia fulva Agassiz & Mayer, 1899
- Bougainvillia macloviana Lesson, 1830
- Bougainvillia meinertiae Jäderholm, 1923
- Bougainvillia muscoides (Sars, 1846)
- Bougainvillia muscus (Allman, 1863)
- Bougainvillia platygaster (Haeckel, 1879)
- Dicoryne conferta (Alder, 1856)
- Garveia crassa (Stechow, 1923)
- Koellikerina fasciculata (Péron & Lesueur, 1810)
- Koellikerina multicirrata (Kramp, 1928)
- Nemopsis bachei L. Agassiz, 1849
- Nubiella mitra Bouillon, 1980
- Pachycordyle navis (Millard, 1959)
- Parawrightia robusta Warren, 1907

==== Family Bythotiaridae ====
- Bythotiara capensis Pagès, Bouillon & Gili, 1991
- Bythotiara murrayi Günther, 1903
- Calycopsis bigelowi Vanhöffen, 1911
- Calycopsis borchgrevinki (Browne, 1910)
- Calycopsis chuni Vanhöffen, 1911
- Calycopsis typa Fewkes, 1882
- Heterotiara minor Vanhöffen, 1911
- Protiaropsis anonyma (Maas, 1905)
- Pseudotiara tropica (Bigelow, 1912)
- Sibogita geometrica Maas, 1905

==== Family Cytaeididae ====
- Cytaeis nassa (Millard, 1959)

==== Family Eudendriidae ====
- Eudendrium angustum Warren, 1908
- Eudendrium antarcticum Stechow, 1921
- Eudendrium capillare Alder, 1856
- Eudendrium carneum Clarke, 1882
- Eudendrium deciduum Millard, 1957
- Eudendrium ramosum (Linnaeus, 1758)
- Eudendrium ritchiei Millard, 1975
- Eudendrium simplex Pieper, 1884

==== Family Hydractiniidae ====
- Clava sp.
- Hydractinia altispina Millard, 1955
- Hydractinia apicata (Kramp, 1959)
- Hydractinia canalifera Millard, 1957
- Hydractinia carica Bergh, 1887
- Hydractinia diogenes Millard, 1959
- Hydractinia kaffraria Millard, 1955
- Hydractinia marsupialia Millard, 1975
- Hydractinia multitentaculata (Millard, 1975)
- Podocoryna carnea M. Sars, 1846

==== Family Hydrichthyidae ====
- Hydrichthys boycei Warren, 1916
- Hydrocorella africana Stechow, 1921

==== Family Magapiidae ====
- Fabienna oligonema (Kramp, 1955)
- Kantiella enigmatica Bouillon, 1978

==== Family Oceaniidae ====
- Corydendrium parasiticum (Linnaeus, 1767)
- Merona cornucopiae (Norman, 1864)
- Rhizogeton nudus Broch, 1910
- Turritopsis nutricula McCrady, 1857

==== Family Pandeidae ====
- Amphinema australis (Mayer, 1900)
- Amphinema dinema (Péron & Lesueur, 1810)
- Amphinema rugosum (Mayer, 1900)
- Amphinema turrida (Mayer, 1900)
- Annatiara affinis (Hartlaub, 1914)
- Halitholus intermedius (Browne, 1902)
- Halitholus pauper Hartlaub, 1914
- Leuckartiara adnata Pagès, Gili & Bouillon, 1992
- Leuckartiara annexa Kramp, 1957
- Leuckartiara gardineri Browne, 1916
- Leuckartiara octona (Fleming, 1823)
- Neoturris papua (Lesson, 1843)
- Neoturris pileata (Forsskål, 1775)
- Octotiara russelli Kramp, 1953
- Pandea conica (Quoy & Gaimard, 1827)
- Pandeopsis ikarii (Uchida, 1927)

==== Family Proboscidactylidae ====
- Proboscidactyla halterata
- Proboscidactyla menoni Pagès, Bouillon & Gili, 1991
- Proboscidactyla mutabilis (Browne, 1902)
- Proboscidactyla ornata (McCrady, 1859)
- Proboscidactyla stellata (Forbes, 1846)

==== Family Rathkeidae ====
- Lizzia blondina Forbes, 1848

==== Family Stylasteridae ====
- Stylaster nobilis (Saville-Kent, 1871) – Noble coral

=== Order Leptothecata ===
==== Family Aequoreidae ====
- Aequorea africana Millard, 1966
- Aequorea australis Uchida, 1947
- Aequorea coerulescens (Brandt, 1835)
- Aequorea conica Browne, 1905
- Aequorea forskalea Péron & Lesueur, 1810 – Crystal jellyfish
- Aequorea macrodactyla (Brandt, 1835)
- Aequorea pensilis (Haeckel, 1879)
- Zygocanna buitendijki Stiasny, 1928
- Zygocanna vagans Bigelow, 1912

==== Family Blackfordiidae ====
- Blackfordia virginica Mayer, 1910

==== Family Campanulinidae ====
- Calycella oligista Ritchie, 1910

==== Family Campanulariidae ====
- Campanularia africana Stechow, 1923
- Campanularia hincksii Alder, 1856
- Campanularia laminacarpa Millard, 1966
- Campanularia morgansi Millard, 1957
- Campanularia pecten Gow & Millard, 1975
- Campanularia roberti Gow & Millard, 1975
- Clytia brunescens (Bigelow, 1904)
- Clytia globosa (Mayer, 1900)
- Clytia hemisphaerica (Linnaeus, 1767)
- Clytia hummelincki (Leloup, 1935)
- Clytia latitheca Millard & Bouillon, 1973
- Clytia linearis (Thorneley, 1900)
- Clytia macrogonia Bouillon, 1984
- Clytia paradoxa (Stechow, 1923)
- Clytia paulensis (Vanhöffen, 1910)
- Clytia phosphorica (Péron & Lesueur, 1810) – taxon inquirendum
- Clytia simplex (Browne, 1902)
- Clytia warreni Stechow, 1919
- Gonothyraea loveni (Allman, 1859)
- Laomedea calceolifera (Hincks, 1871)
- Obelia bidentata Clark, 1875
- Obelia dichotoma (Linnaeus, 1758)
- Obelia geniculata (Linnaeus, 1758)
- Orthopyxis everta (Clark, 1876)
- Orthopyxis integra (MacGillivray, 1842)

==== Family Eirenidae ====
- Eirene ceylonensis Browne, 1905
- Eirene hexanemalis (Goette, 1886)
- Eirene menoni Kramp, 1953
- Eirene palkensis Browne, 1905
- Eirene viridula (Péron & Lesueur, 1809)
- Eutima curva Browne, 1905
- Eutima gegenbauri (Haeckel, 1864)
- Eutima hartlaubi Kramp, 1958
- Eutima japonica Uchida, 1925
- Eutima levuka (Agassiz & Mayer, 1899)
- Eutima mira McCrady, 1859
- Phialopsis diegensis Torrey, 1909
- Tima bairdii (Johnston, 1833)

==== Family Hebellidae ====
- Hebella dispolians (Warren, 1909)
- Hebella furax Millard, 1957
- Hebella parvula(Hincks, 1853) – (nomen dubium)
- Hebella scandens (Bale, 1888)
- Scandia mutabilis (Ritchie, 1907)

==== Family Laodiceidae ====
- Laodicea fijiana Agassiz & Mayer, 1899
- Laodicea pulchra Browne, 1902
- Laodicea undulata (Forbes & Goodsir, 1853)
- Staurodiscus polynema (Kramp, 1959)

==== Family Lineolariidae ====
- Nicoliana gravierae (Millard, 1975)

==== Family Lovenellidae ====
- Cirrholovenia polynema Kramp, 1959
- Cirrholovenia tetranema Kramp, 1959
- Eucheilota paradoxica Mayer, 1900
- Mitrocomium cirratum Haeckel, 1879

==== Family Malagazziidae ====
- Malagazzia carolinae (Mayer, 1900)
- Malagazzia condensum (Kramp, 1953)

==== Family Mitrocomidae ====
- Cosmetirella davisi (Browne, 1902)
- Mitrocomella grandis Kramp, 1965
- Mitrocomella millardae Pagès, Gili & Bouillon, 1992

==== Family Phialellidae ====
- Phialella chiquitita (Millard, 1959)
- Phialella falklandica Browne, 1902
- Phialella quadrata (Forbes, 1848)
- Phialella turrita (Hincks, 1868)

==== Family Sertulariidae ====
- Abietinaria laevimarginata (Ritchie, 1907)
- Amphisbetia maplestonei (Bale, 1884)
- Amphisbetia minima (Thompson, 1879)
- Amphisbetia operculata (Linnaeus, 1758)
- Calamphora campanulata (Warren, 1908)
- Crateritheca acanthostoma (Bale, 1882)
- Dictyocladium coactum Stechow, 1923
- Diphasia digitalis (Busk, 1852)
- Diphasia heurteli Billard, 1924
- Diphasia tetraglochina Billard, 1907
- Dynamena crisioides Lamouroux, 1824
- Dynamena disticha (Bosc, 1802)
- Dynamena obliqua Lamouroux, 1816
- Dynamena quadridentata (Ellis & Solander, 1786)
- Idiellana pristis (Lamouroux, 1816)
- Salacia desmoides (Torrey, 1902)
- Salacia disjuncta Millard, 1964
- Sertularella africana Stechow, 1919
- Sertularella agulhensis Millard, 1964
- Sertularella arbuscula (Lamouroux, 1816)
- Sertularella areyi Nutting, 1904
- Sertularella capensis Millard, 1957
- Sertularella congregata Millard, 1964
- Sertularella diaphana (Allman, 1885)
- Sertularella distans (Lamouroux, 1816)
- Sertularella dubia Billard, 1907
- Sertularella flabellum (Allman, 1885)
- Sertularella fusiformis (Hincks, 1861)
- Sertularella gilchristi Millard, 1964
- Sertularella goliathus Stechow, 1923
- Sertularella leiocarpa (Allman, 1888)
- Sertularella marginata Not found in WoRMS Could it be Sertularia marginata (Kirchenpauer, 1864)
- Sertularella mediterranea Hartlaub, 1901
- Sertularella megista Stechow, 1923
- Sertularella natalensis Millard, 1968
- Sertularella polyzonias (Linnaeus, 1758)
- Sertularella pulchra Stechow, 1923
- Sertularella striata Stechow, 1923
- Sertularella xantha Stechow, 1923
- Sertularia loculosa Busk, 1852
- Sertularia marginata (Kirchenpauer, 1864)
- Sertularia turbinata (Lamouroux, 1816)
- Staurotheca echinocarpa (Allman, 1888)
- Stereotheca elongata (Lamouroux, 1816)
- Symplectoscyphus amphoriferus (Allman, 1877)
- Symplectoscyphus arboriformis (Marktanner-Turneretscher, 1890)
- Symplectoscyphus macrogonus (Trebilcock, 1928)
- Symplectoscyphus paulensis Stechow, 1923
- Symplectoscyphus secundus (Kirchenpauer, 1884)
- Thuiaria articulata (Pallas, 1766)
- Thyroscyphus aequalis Warren, 1908
- Thyroscyphus fruticosus (Esper, 1793)

==== Family Syntheciidae ====
- Hincksella corrugata Millard, 1958
- Hincksella cylindrica (Bale, 1888)
- Synthecium dentigerum Jarvis, 1922
- Synthecium elegans Allman, 1872
- Synthecium hians Millard, 1957

==== Family Thyroscyphidae ====
- Parascyphus simplex (Lamouroux, 1816)

==== Family Tiarannidae ====
- Chromatonema rubrum Fewkes, 1882
- Margalefia intermedia Pagès, Bouillon & Gili, 1991
- Modeeria rotunda (Quoy & Gaimard, 1827)
- Stegolaria geniculata (Allman, 1888)

==== Family Tiaropsidae ====
- Tiaropsidium roseum (Maas, 1905)

==== Superfamily Plumularioidea, family Aglaopheniidae ====
- Aglaophenia cupressina Lamouroux, 1816
- Aglaophenia latecarinata Allman, 1877
- Aglaophenia pluma (Linnaeus, 1758)
- Cladocarpus crepidatus Millard, 1975
- Cladocarpus distomus Clarke, 1907
- Cladocarpus dofleini (Stechow, 1911)
- Cladocarpus inflatus Vervoort, 1966
- Cladocarpus leloupi Millard, 1962
- Cladocarpus lignosus (Kirchenpauer, 1872)
- Cladocarpus millardae Vervoort, 1966
- Cladocarpus natalensis Millard, 1977
- Cladocarpus paries Millard, 1975
- Cladocarpus sinuosus Vervoort, 1966
- Cladocarpus tenuis Clarke, 1879
- Cladocarpus unicornus Millard, 1975
- Cladocarpus valdiviae Stechow, 1923
- Gymnangium africanum (Millard, 1958)
- Gymnangium allmani (Marktanner-Turneretscher, 1890)
- Gymnangium arcuatum (Lamouroux, 1816)
- Gymnangium exsertum (Millard, 1962)
- Gymnangium ferlusi (Billard, 1901)
- Gymnangium gracilicaule (Jäderholm, 1903)
- Gymnangium hians (Busk, 1852)
- Gymnangium longirostre (Kirchenpauer, 1872)
- Gymnangium montagui (Billard, 1912)
- Lytocarpia brevirostris (Busk, 1852)
- Lytocarpia delicatula (Busk, 1852)
- Lytocarpia flexuosa (Lamouroux, 1816)
- Lytocarpia formosa (Busk, 1851)
- Macrorhynchia filamentosa (Lamarck, 1816)
- Macrorhynchia philippina Kirchenpauer, 1872
- Macrorhynchia phoenicea (Busk, 1852)

==== Family Haleciidae ====
- Halecium beanii (Johnston, 1838)
- Halecium delicatulum Coughtrey, 1876
- Halecium dichotomum Allman, 1888
- Halecium dyssymetrum Billard, 1929
- Halecium halecinum (Linnaeus, 1758)
- Halecium inhacae Millard, 1958
- Halecium lankesterii (Bourne, 1890)
- Halecium muricatum (Ellis & Solander, 1786)
- Halecium sessile Norman, 1866
- Halecium tenellum Hincks, 1861
- Hydrodendron cornucopiae (Millard, 1955)
- Hydrodendron gardineri (Jarvis, 1922)
- Hydrodendron gracillis (Fraser, 1914)
- Hydrodendron mirabile (Hincks, 1866)
- Hydrodendron sympodiformis Millard & Bouillon, 1974

==== Family Halopterididae ====
- Antennella quadriaurita Ritchie, 1909
- Antennella secundaria (Gmelin, 1791)
- Corhiza bellicosa Millard, 1962
- Corhiza complexa (Nutting, 1905)
- Corhiza pannosa Millard, 1962
- Corhiza scotiae (Ritchie, 1907)
- Gattya conspecta (Billard, 1907)
- Gattya heurteli (Billard, 1907)
- Gattya humilis Allman, 1885
- Gattya multithecata (Jarvis, 1922)
- Halopteris gemellipara Millard, 1962
- Halopteris glutinosa (Lamouroux, 1816)
- Halopteris polymorpha (Billard, 1913)
- Halopteris pseudoconstricta Millard, 1975
- Halopteris rostrata Millard, 1975
- Halopteris tuba (Kirchenpauer, 1876)
- Monostaechas faurei Millard, 1958
- Monostaechas natalensis Millard, 1958
- Monostaechas quadridens (McCrady, 1859)
- Schizotricha frutescens (Ellis & Solander, 1786)

==== Family Kirchenpaueriidae ====
- Kirchenpaueria bonnevieae (Billard, 1906)
- Kirchenpaueria halecioides (Alder, 1859)
- Kirchenpaueria pinnata (Linnaeus, 1758)
- Kirchenpaueria triangulata (Totton, 1930)
- Oswaldella nova (Jarvis, 1922)
- Pycnotheca mirabilis (Allman, 1883)

==== Family Lafoeidae ====
- Acryptolaria conferta (Allman, 1877)
- Acryptolaria crassicaulis (Allman, 1888)
- Acryptolaria rectangularis (Jarvis, 1922)
- Cryptolarella abyssicola (Allman, 1888)
- Cryptolaria pectinata (Allman, 1888)
- Filellum antarcticum (Hartlaub, 1904)
- Filellum serpens (Hassall, 1848)
- Filellum serratum (Clarke, 1879)
- Lafoea benthophila Ritchie, 1909
- Lafoea dumosa (Fleming, 1820)
- Zygophylax africana Stechow, 1923
- Zygophylax antipathes (Lamarck, 1816)
- Zygophylax armata (Ritchie, 1907)
- Zygophylax biarmata Billard, 1905
- Zygophylax geminocarpa Millard, 1958
- Zygophylax geniculata (Clarke, 1894)
- Zygophylax infundibulum Millard, 1958
- Zygophylax sibogae Billard, 1918

==== Family Plumulariidae ====
- Dentitheca bidentata (Jäderholm, 1905)
- Nemertesia antennina (Linnaeus, 1758)
- Nemertesia ciliata Bale, 1914
- Nemertesia cymodocea (Busk, 1851)
- Nemertesia ramosa (Lamarck, 1816)
- Plumularia antonbruuni Millard, 1967
- Plumularia filicaulis Kirchenpauer, 1876
- Plumularia floridana Nutting, 1900 1973
- Plumularia lagenifera Allman, 1885
- Plumularia mossambicae Millard, 1975
- Plumularia obliqua (Johnston, 1847)
- Plumularia pulchella Bale, 1882
- Plumularia setacea (Linnaeus, 1758)
- Plumularia spinulosa Bale, 1882
- Plumularia strictocarpa Pictet, 1893
- Plumularia warreni Stechow, 1919
- Plumularia wasini Jarvis, 1922

=== Order Siphonophorae, suborder Calycophorae ===
==== Family Abylidae, subfamily Abylinae ====
- Abyla bicarinata Moser, 1925
- Abyla haeckeli Lens & van Riemsdijk, 1908
- Abyla trigona Quoy & Gaimard, 1827
- Ceratocymba dentata (Bigelow, 1918)
- Ceratocymba leuckarti (Huxley, 1859)
- Ceratocymba sagittata (Quoy & Gaimard, 1827)

===== Subfamily Abylopsinae =====
- Abylopsis eschscholtzi (Huxley, 1859)
- Abylopsis tetragona (Otto, 1823)
- Bassia bassensis (Quoy & Gaimard, 1833)
- Enneagonum hyalinum Quoy & Gaimard, 1827

==== Family Clausophyidae ====
- Chuniphyes multidentata Lens & van Riemsdijk, 1908
- Crystallophyes amygdalina Moser, 1925
- Heteropyramis crystallina (Moser, 1925)
- Heteropyramis maculata Moser, 1925
- Kephyes ovata (Keferstein & Ehlers, 1860)

==== Family Diphyidae, subfamily Diphyinae ====
- Chelophyes appendiculata (Eschscholtz, 1829)
- Chelophyes contorta (Lens & van Riemsdijk, 1908)
- Dimophyes arctica (Chun, 1897)
- Diphyes bojani (Eschscholtz, 1825)
- Diphyes chamissonis Huxley, 1859
- Diphyes dispar Chamisso & Eysenhardt, 1821
- Eudoxoides mitra (Huxley, 1859)
- Eudoxoides spiralis (Bigelow, 1911)
- Lensia achilles Totton, 1941
- Lensia ajax Totton, 1941
- Lensia campanella (Moser, 1917)
- Lensia conoidea (Keferstein & Ehlers, 1860)
- Lensia cossack Totton, 1941
- Lensia exeter Totton, 1941
- Lensia fowleri (Bigelow, 1911)
- Lensia gnanamuthui Daniel & Daniel, 1963
- Lensia grimaldii Leloup, 1933
- Lensia hardy Totton, 1941
- Lensia havock Totton, 1941
- Lensia hostile Totton, 1941
- Lensia hotspur Totton, 1941
- Lensia hunter Totton, 1941
- Lensia lelouveteau Totton, 1941
- Lensia meteori (Leloup, 1934)
- Lensia multicristata (Moser, 1925)
- Lensia pannikari Daniel, 1971
- Lensia subtilis (Chun, 1886)
- Lensia subtiloides (Lens & van Riemsdijk, 1908)
- Muggiaea atlantica Cunningham, 1892
- Muggiaea kochi (Will, 1844)

===== Subfamily Sulculeolariinae =====
- Sulculeolaria biloba (Sars, 1846)
- Sulculeolaria chuni (Lens & van Riemsdijk, 1908)
- Sulculeolaria monoica (Chun, 1888)
- Sulculeolaria quadrivalvis de Blainville, 1830
- Sulculeolaria turgida (Gegenbaur, 1854)

==== Family Hippopodiidae ====
- Hippopodius hippopus (Forsskål, 1776)
- Vogtia glabra Bigelow, 1918
- Vogtia pentacantha Kölliker, 1853
- Vogtia serrata (Moser, 1925)

==== Family Prayidae, subfamily Amphicaryoninae ====
- Amphicaryon acaule Chun, 1888
- Amphicaryon ernesti Totton, 1954
- Amphicaryon peltifera (Haeckel, 1888)

===== Subfamily Nectopyramidinae =====
- Nectadamas diomedeae (Bigelow, 1911)
- Nectopyramis natans (Bigelow, 1911)
- Nectopyramis thetis Bigelow, 1911

===== Subfamily Prayinae =====
- Desmophyes annectens Haeckel, 1888
- Praya dubia (Quoy & Gaimard, 1833)
- Praya reticulata (Bigelow, 1911)
- Rosacea cymbiformis (Delle Chiaje, 1830)
- Rosacea plicata Bigelow, 1911

==== Family Sphaeronectidae ====
- Sphaeronectes koellikeri Huxley, 1859

=== Suborder Cystonectae ===
==== Family Physaliidae ====
- Physalia physalis (Linnaeus, 1758)

==== Family Rhizophysidae ====
- Rhizophysa eysenhardti Gegenbaur, 1859
- Rhizophysa filiformis (Forsskål, 1775)

=== Suborder Physonectae ===
==== Family Agalmatidae ====
- Agalma elegans (Sars, 1846)
- Agalma okenii Eschscholtz, 1825
- Athorybia rosacea (Forsskål, 1775)
- Cordagalma ordinata (Haeckel, 1888)
- Halistemma rubrum (Vogt, 1852)
- Marrus antarcticus Totton, 1954
- Marrus orthocannoides Totton, 1954
- Melophysa melo (Quoy & Gaimard, 1827)
- Nanomia bijuga (Delle Chiaje, 1844)

==== Family Apolemiidae ====
- Apolemia uvaria (Lesueur, 1815)

==== Family Forskaliidae ====
- Forskalia contorta (Milne-Edwards, 1841)
- Forskalia edwardsi Kölliker, 1853
- Forskalia tholoides Haeckel, 1888 – (taxon inquirendum)

==== Family Physophoridae ====
- Physophora hydrostatica Forsskål, 1775

==== Family Pyrostephidae ====
- Bargmannia elongata Totton, 1954

== Subclass Trachylinae ==
=== Order Limnomedusae ===
==== Family Olindiidae ====
- Aglauropsis edwardsi Pagès, Bouillon & Gili, 1991
- Aglauropsis edwardsii Pagès, Bouillon & Gili, 1991

=== Order Narcomedusae ===
==== Family Aeginidae ====
- Aegina citrea Eschscholtz, 1829
- Aeginura grimaldii Maas, 1904
- Solmundella bitentaculata (Quoy & Gaimard, 1833)

==== Family Cuninidae ====
- Cunina duplicata Maas, 1893
- Cunina frugifera Kramp, 1948
- Cunina globosa Eschscholtz, 1829
- Cunina octonaria McCrady, 1857
- Cunina peregrina Bigelow, 1909
- Solmissus marshalli Agassiz & Mayer, 1902

==== Family Solmarisidae ====
- Pegantha clara Bigelow, 1909
- Pegantha laevis H. B. Bigelow, 1909
- Pegantha martagon Haeckel, 1879
- Pegantha rubiginosa (Kölliker, 1853)
- Pegantha triloba Haeckel, 1879
- Solmaris lenticula Haeckel, 1879

=== Order Trachymedusae ===
==== Family Geryoniidae ====
- Geryonia proboscidalis (Forsskål, 1775)
- Liriope tetraphylla (Chamisso & Eysenhardt, 1821)

==== Family Halicreatidae ====
- Botrynema brucei Browne, 1908
- Halicreas minimum Fewkes, 1882
- Haliscera conica Vanhöffen, 1902
- Halitrephes maasi Bigelow, 1909

==== Family Rhopalonematidae ====
- Aglantha elata (Haeckel, 1879)
- Aglaura hemistoma Péron & Lesueur, 1810
- Amphogona apicata Kramp, 1957
- Colobonema sericeum Vanhöffen, 1902
- Crossota alba Bigelow, 1913
- Crossota brunnea Vanhöffen, 1902
- Pantachogon haeckeli Maas, 1893
- Persa incolorata McCrady, 1857
- Rhopalonema funerarium Vanhöffen, 1902
- Rhopalonema velatum Gegenbaur, 1857
- Sminthea eurygaster Gegenbaur, 1856
- Tetrorchis erythrogaster Bigelow, 1909

== Class Scyphozoa ==
=== Order Coronatae ===
==== Family Atollidae ====
- Atolla russelli Repelin, 1962
- Atolla wyvillei Haeckel, 1880

==== Family Nausithoidae ====
- Nausithoe punctata Kölliker, 1853

==== Family Periphyllidae ====
- Periphylla periphylla (Péron & Lesueur, 1810)

=== Order Carybdeida ===
==== Family Carybdeidae ====
- Carybdea branchi Gershwin & Gibbons, 2009 – Box jellyfish

=== Order Rhizostomeae, suborder Kolpophorae ===
==== Family Cassiopeidae ====
- Cassiopea andromeda (Forsskål, 1775)
- Cassiopea depressa Haeckel, 1880

==== Family Cepheidae ====
- Cephea coerulea Vanhöffen, 1902

=== Suborder Daktyliophorae ===
==== Familu Catostylidae ====
- Catostylus mosaicus (Quoy & Gaimard,1824) – Blue blubber
- Catostylus tagi (Haeckel, 1869)
- Crambionella stuhlmanni (Chun, 1896)

==== Family Rhizostomatidae ====
- Eupilema inexpectata Pages, Gili & Bouillon, 1992 – Root mouthed sea jelly
- Rhizostoma luteum (Quoy & Gaimard, 1827)
- Rhizostoma pulmo (Macri, 1778)

=== Order Semaeostomeae ===
==== Family Cyaneidae ====
- Cyanea annasethe Haeckel, 1880 – Lion's mane (nomen dubium)
- Cyanea capillata (Linnaeus, 1758) – Lion's mane
- Drymonema dalmatinum Haeckel, 1880

==== Family Pelagiidae ====
- Chrysaora fulgida (Reynaud, 1830)
- Chrysaora hysoscella (Linnaeus, 1767) – Compass jelly; Red-banded jelly
- Chrysaora quinquecirrha (Desor, 1848)
- Pelagia noctiluca (Forsskål, 1775) – Night-light jelly

==== Family Ulmaridae ====
- Aurelia aurita (Linnaeus, 1758) – Moon jellyfish
- Discomedusa lobata Claus, 1877
- Phacellophora camtschatica Brandt, 1835
- Undosa undulata Haeckel, 1880

== Class Staurozoa ==
=== Order Stauromedusae, suborder Cleistocarpida ===
==== Family Depastridae ====
- Depastromorpha africana Carlgren, 1935 – Stalked trumpet jelly

==== Family Lipkeidae ====
- Lipkea stephensoni Carlgren, 1933 – Bell stalked jelly
