= Eudendrium speciosum =

Scientific classification
- Kingdom: Animalia
- Phylum: Cnidaria
- Class: Hydrozoa
- Order: Anthoathecata
- Family: Eudendriidae
- Genus: Eudendrium
- Species: E. speciosum

Binomial name
- Eudendrium speciosum Fraser, 1945

Species of hydrozoan

Eudendrium speciosum is a marine species of cnidaria, a hydroid (Hydrozoa) belonging to the Eudendriidae family.
