= Eudendrium armstrongi =

Scientific classification
- Domain: Eukaryota
- Kingdom: Animalia
- Phylum: Cnidaria
- Class: Hydrozoa
- Order: Anthoathecata
- Family: Eudendriidae
- Genus: Eudendrium
- Species: E. armstrongi

Binomial name
- Eudendrium armstrongi Stechow, 1909

Synonyms
- Eudendrium ramosum Armstrong, 1879

Species of hydrozoan

Eudendrium armstrongi is a marine species of cnidaria, a hydroid (Hydrozoa) in the family Eudendriidae. The type locality is Japan at 800m depth.
