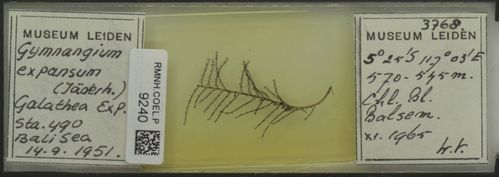
- specimen RMNH.COEL.P.9240, collected in the Bali Sea at a depth of 570-545 m (Naturalis Biodiversity Center)

Scientific classification
- Kingdom: Animalia
- Phylum: Cnidaria
- Class: Hydrozoa
- Order: Leptothecata
- Family: Aglaopheniidae
- Genus: Gymnangium
- Species: G. expansum

Binomial name
- Gymnangium expansum (Jäderholm, 1903)

Synonyms
- Halicornaria expansa Jäderholm, 1903; Halicetta expansa (Jäderholm, 1903); Halicornaria sibogae Billard, 1918

= Gymnangium expansum =

Species of cnidarian

Gymnangium expansum is a species of hydrozoan in the family, Aglaopheniidae, first described in 1903 by Axel Elof Jäderholm as Halicornaria expansa,

GBIF data show it as being found in both the north and south of the western Pacific Ocean.
