= Eudendrium deciduum =

Scientific classification
- Kingdom: Animalia
- Phylum: Cnidaria
- Class: Hydrozoa
- Order: Anthoathecata
- Family: Eudendriidae
- Genus: Eudendrium
- Species: E. deciduum

Binomial name
- Eudendrium deciduum Millard, 1957

Species of cnidarian

Eudendrium deciduum is a marine species of cnidaria, a hydroid (Hydrozoa) in the family Eudendriidae.
