= Eudendrium caricum =

Scientific classification
- Kingdom: Animalia
- Phylum: Cnidaria
- Class: Hydrozoa
- Order: Anthoathecata
- Family: Eudendriidae
- Genus: Eudendrium
- Species: E. caricum

Binomial name
- Eudendrium caricum Jäderholm, 1908

Species of hydrozoan

Eudendrium caricum is a marine species of cnidaria, a hydroid (class Hydrozoa) in the family Eudendriidae. It was originally described by Axel Elof Jäderholm in 1908
