= Eudendrium album =

Scientific classification
- Domain: Eukaryota
- Kingdom: Animalia
- Phylum: Cnidaria
- Class: Hydrozoa
- Order: Anthoathecata
- Family: Eudendriidae
- Genus: Eudendrium
- Species: E. album

Binomial name
- Eudendrium album Nutting, 1898

Synonyms
- Eudendrium fragile Motz-Kossowska, 1905; Eudendrium islandicum Schuchert, 2000

Species of hydrozoan

Eudendrium album is a marine species of cnidaria, a hydroid (Hydrozoa) in the family Eudendriidae.
