= Myrionema =

Myrionema may refer to:

- Myrionema (cnidarian), a genus of hydrozoans in the family Eudendriidae
- Myrionema (alga), a genus of algae in the family Chordariaceae
