= Eudendrium corrugatum =

Scientific classification
- Domain: Eukaryota
- Kingdom: Animalia
- Phylum: Cnidaria
- Class: Hydrozoa
- Order: Anthoathecata
- Family: Eudendriidae
- Genus: Eudendrium
- Species: E. corrugatum

Binomial name
- Eudendrium corrugatum Watson, 1985

Species of hydrozoan

Eudendrium corrugatum is a marine species of cnidaria, a hydroid (Hydrozoa) in the family Eudendriidae.
