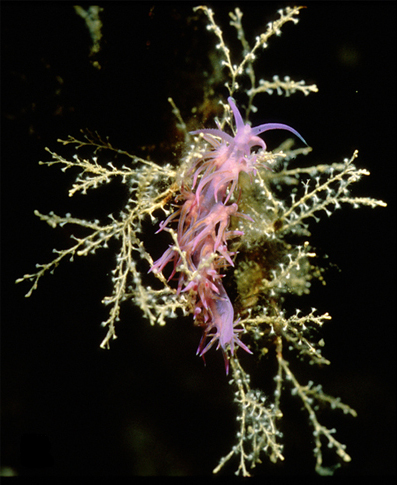
- Flabellina affinis feeding on a Eudendrium racemosum

Scientific classification
- Kingdom: Animalia
- Phylum: Cnidaria
- Class: Hydrozoa
- Order: Anthoathecata
- Family: Eudendriidae
- Genus: Eudendrium; Ehrenberg, 1834

Species
- 74, see below.

= Eudendrium =

Genus of cnidarians

Eudendrium is a large genus of hydroids (Hydrozoa), one of two in the family Eudendriidae. These animals are marine cnidarias in the family Eudendriidae.

== Species ==
Species so far described in this genus include:

- Eudendrium album Nutting, 1898
- Eudendrium angustum Warren, 1908
- Eudendrium annulatum Norman, 1864
- Eudendrium antarcticum Stechow, 1921
- Eudendrium arbuscula Wright, 1859
- Eudendrium armatum Tichomiroff, 1890
- Eudendrium armstongi Stechow, 1909
- Eudendrium attenuatum Allman, 1877
- Eudendrium aylingae Watson, 1985
- Eudendrium balei Watson, 1985
- Eudendrium bathyalis Marques & Calder, 2000
- Eudendrium bermudense Calder, 1988
- Eudendrium biseriale Fraser, 1935
- Eudendrium boreale Yamada, 1954
- Eudendrium breve Fraser, 1938
- Eudendrium calceolatum Motz-Kossowska, 1905
- Eudendrium californicum Torrey, 1902
- Eudendrium capillare Alder, 1856
- Eudendrium capillaroides Schuchert, 2008
- Eudendrium caraiuru Marques & Oliveira, 2003
- Eudendrium caricum Jäderholm, 1908
- Eudendrium carneum Clarke, 1882
- Eudendrium centicaule Fraser, 1938
- Eudendrium cingulatum Stimpson, 1854
- Eudendrium cnidoferum Stechow, 1919
- Eudendrium cochleatum Allman, 1877
- Eudendrium corrugatum Watson, 1985
- Eudendrium currumbense Watson, 1985
- Eudendrium cyathiferum Jäderholm, 1904
- Eudendrium deciduum Millard, 1957
- Eudendrium deforme Hartlaub, 1905
- Eudendrium dispar L. Agassiz, 1862
- Eudendrium distichum Clarke, 1879
- Eudendrium exiguum Allman, 1877
- Eudendrium eximium Allman, 1877
- Eudendrium fruticosum Allman, 1877
- Eudendrium garis Puce, Cerrano, Di Camillo, Bavestrello & Marques, 2006
- Eudendrium generale von Lendenfeld, 1885
- Eudendrium glomeratum Picard, 1952
- Eudendrium imperiale Yamada, 1954
- Eudendrium infundibuliforme Kirkpatrick, 1890
- Eudendrium irregulare Fraser, 1922
- Eudendrium jaederholmi Puce, Cerrano & Bavestrello, 2002
- Eudendrium japonicum Yamada, 1954
- Eudendrium kirkpatricki Watson, 1985
- Eudendrium klausi Puce, Cerrano, Marques & Bavestrello, 2005
- Eudendrium laxum Allman, 1877
- Eudendrium macquariensis Watson, 2003
- Eudendrium magnificum Yamada, 1954
- Eudendrium maldivense Borradaile, 1905
- Eudendrium maorianus Schuchert, 1996
- Eudendrium merulum Watson, 1985
- Eudendrium minutum Watson, 1985
- Eudendrium moulouyensis Marques, Peña Cantero & Vervoort, 2000
- Eudendrium mucronatum Billiard, 1926
- Eudendrium nambuccense Watson, 1985
- Eudendrium nodosum Fraser, 1938
- Eudendrium novazealandiae Marktanner-Turneretscher, 1890
- Eudendrium parvum Warren, 1908
- Eudendrium pennycuikae Watson, 1985
- Eudendrium pocaruquarum Marques, 1995
- Eudendrium racemosum (Cavolini, 1785)
- Eudendrium rameum (Pallas, 1766)
- Eudendrium ramosum (Linnaeus, 1758)
- Eudendrium ritchiei Millard, 1975
- Eudendrium rugosum Fraser, 1940
- Eudendrium sagaminum Yamada, 1954
- Eudendrium scotti Puce, Cerrano & Bavestrello, 2002
- Eudendrium simplex Pieper, 1884
- Eudendrium speciosum Fraser, 1945
- Eudendrium terranovae Watson, 1895
- Eudendrium tottoni Stechow, 1932
- Eudendrium vaginatum Allman, 1863
- Eudendrium vervoorti Marques & Migotto, 1998
