= Eudendrium arbuscula =

Scientific classification
- Domain: Eukaryota
- Kingdom: Animalia
- Phylum: Cnidaria
- Class: Hydrozoa
- Order: Anthoathecata
- Family: Eudendriidae
- Genus: Eudendrium
- Species: E. arbuscula

Binomial name
- Eudendrium arbuscula Wright, 1859

Synonyms
- Eudendrium arbusculum Hincks, 1868; Eudendrium rigidum Allman, 1876; Eudendrium wrightii Hartlaub, 1905

Species of hydrozoan

Eudendrium arbuscula is a marine species of cnidaria, a hydroid (Hydrozoa) in the family Eudendriidae.

== Distribution ==
This species can be found in the Mediterranean Sea, northwest Atlantic Ocean and in European waters.
