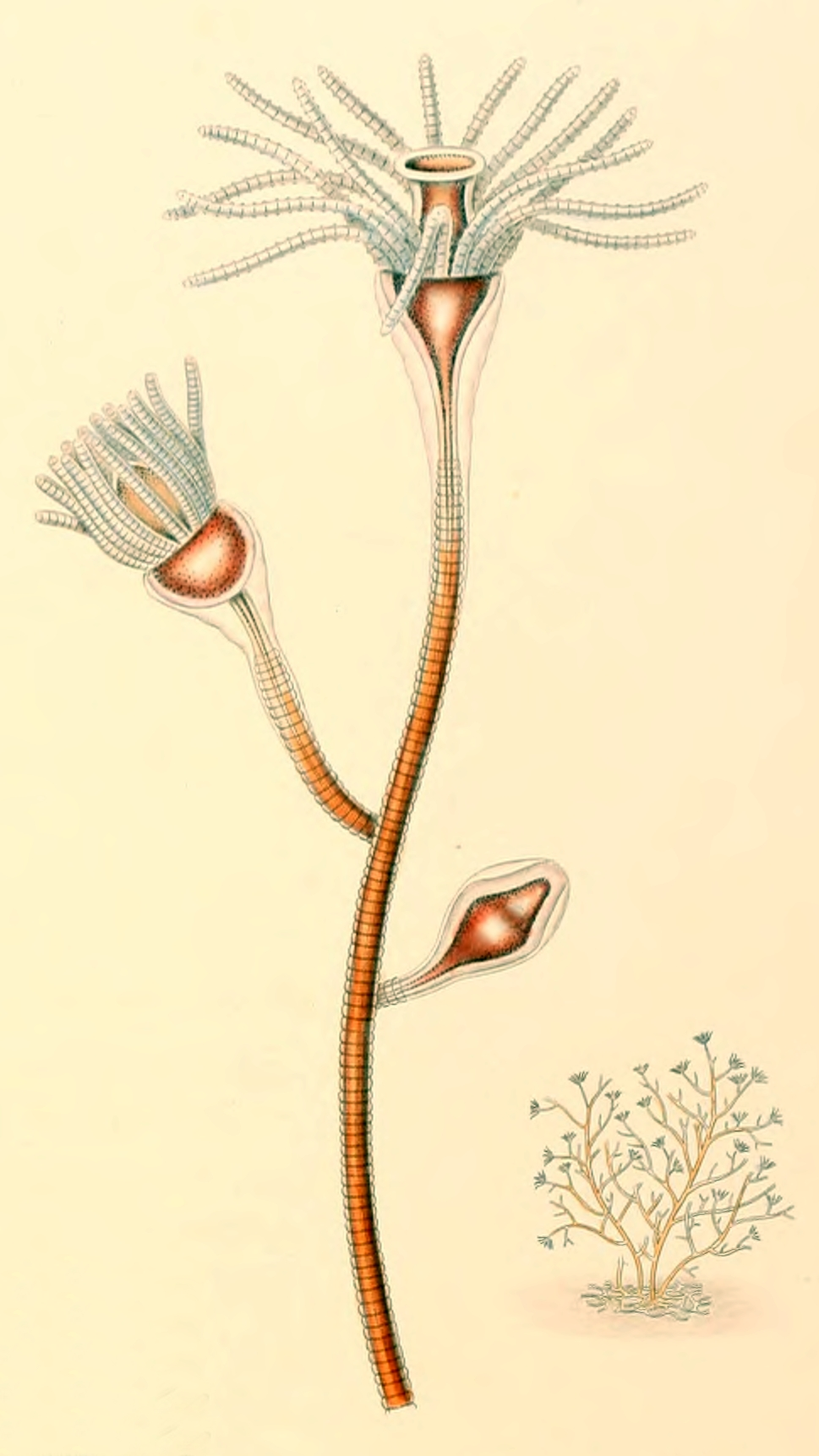

Scientific classification
- Kingdom: Animalia
- Phylum: Cnidaria
- Class: Hydrozoa
- Order: Anthoathecata
- Family: Eudendriidae
- Genus: Eudendrium
- Species: E. vaginatum

Binomial name
- Eudendrium vaginatum Allman, 1863

= Eudendrium vaginatum =

Species of hydrozoan

Eudendrium vaginatum is a marine species of cnidaria, a hydroid (Hydrozoa) in the family Eudendriidae.
