= Eudendrium scotti =

Scientific classification
- Domain: Eukaryota
- Kingdom: Animalia
- Phylum: Cnidaria
- Class: Hydrozoa
- Order: Anthoathecata
- Family: Eudendriidae
- Genus: Eudendrium
- Species: E. scotti

Binomial name
- Eudendrium scotti Puce, Cerrano & Bavestrello, 2002

Species of hydrozoan

Eudendrium scotti is a marine species of cnidaria, a hydroid (Hydrozoa) in the family Eudendriidae.
