= Eudendrium dispar =

Scientific classification
- Domain: Eukaryota
- Kingdom: Animalia
- Phylum: Cnidaria
- Class: Hydrozoa
- Order: Anthoathecata
- Family: Eudendriidae
- Genus: Eudendrium
- Species: E. dispar

Binomial name
- Eudendrium dispar L. Agassiz, 1862

Species of hydrozoan

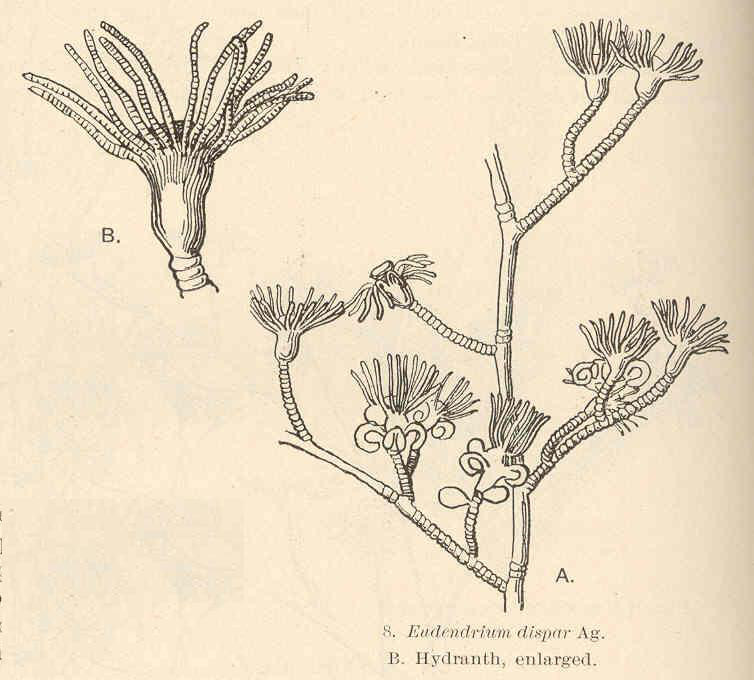
American zoologist and curator

Eudendrium dispar is a marine species of cnidaria, a hydroid (Hydrozoa) in the family Eudendriidae.
