= Eudendrium klausi =

Scientific classification
- Domain: Eukaryota
- Kingdom: Animalia
- Phylum: Cnidaria
- Class: Hydrozoa
- Order: Anthoathecata
- Family: Eudendriidae
- Genus: Eudendrium
- Species: E. klausi

Binomial name
- Eudendrium klausi Puce, Cerrano, Marques & Bavestrello, 2005

Species of hydrozoan

Eudendrium klausi is a marine species of cnidaria, a hydroid (Hydrozoa) in the family Eudendriidae.
