= Eudendrium glomeratum =

Scientific classification
- Domain: Eukaryota
- Kingdom: Animalia
- Phylum: Cnidaria
- Class: Hydrozoa
- Order: Anthoathecata
- Family: Eudendriidae
- Genus: Eudendrium
- Species: E. glomeratum

Binomial name
- Eudendrium glomeratum Picard, 1952

Species of hydrozoan

Eudendrium glomeratum is a marine species of cnidaria, a hydroid (Hydrozoa) in the family Eudendriidae.
