= Eudendrium exiguum =

Scientific classification
- Domain: Eukaryota
- Kingdom: Animalia
- Phylum: Cnidaria
- Class: Hydrozoa
- Order: Anthoathecata
- Family: Eudendriidae
- Genus: Eudendrium
- Species: E. exiguum

Binomial name
- Eudendrium exiguum Allman, 1877

Species of hydrozoan

Eudendrium exiguum is a marine species of cnidaria, a hydroid (Hydrozoa) in the family Eudendriidae.
