= List of authors of South African animal taxa =

Authors who have named South African animals

List of authors of South African animal taxa is a list of authors who have described or revised South African animals, and the standard forms used for identification of those authors in the zoological literature.

The complete entry for each author is given on a single line showing the standard form for their name, name link, dates and other names by which they have been known. Following this comes a list of major groups they have worked on. In cases where there is more than one person who may be referred to by a name, one or more dates of publication may help with disambiguation.

== The major groups are ==
- Invertebrate
  - Porifera
  - Ctenophores
  - Cnidarians
  - Platyhelminthes
  - Nematodes
  - Nemerteans
  - Annelids
  - Arthropods
  - Bryozoans
  - Brachiopods
  - Molluscs
  - Echinoderms
  - Tunicates
- Vertebrates
  - Fish
  - Amphibians
  - Birds
  - Mammals
  - Reptiles

The dates given are those of birth and death where one or both are available. If neither is known, a date on which the author is known to have published a name (usually the earliest, and optionally also the latest, if more than one is known) is given preceded by 'fl.' (floruit).

== A ==
- Abbott fl. 1861
- Ahl fl. 1789
- Alcock fl. 1896 – Alfred William Alcock (1859-1933)
- Andriashev fl. 1962 – Anatoly Petrovich Andriashev (1910–2009)
- Ascanius fl.1772

== B ==
- Balushkin fl. 1988 – Arkadii Vladimirovich Balushkin
- Barnard fl. 1923
- Bass fl. 1975
- Bean fl. 1895 - 1925
- Bekker fl. 1967
- Bennett fl. 1831
- Bertelsen fl. 1976 – E. Bertelsen
- Branch – William Roy Branch 1946 - 2018, Herpetology
- Brauer fl. 1906
- Bibron fl. 1839
- Bleeker fl. 1851 – Pieter Bleeker (1819–1878)
- Bloch fl. 1923
- Bocage fl. 1864 – José Vicente Barbosa du Bocage (1823–1907)
- Bolin fl. 1946
- Bonaparte fl. 1832 – Charles Lucien Jules Laurent Bonaparte (1794–1857) ornithology
- Bonnaterre fl. 178 – Pierre Joseph Bonnaterre (1747–1804)
- Borodin fl. 1928 – Nikolai Andreyevich Borodin (1861–1937)
- Borodulina fl. 1977
- Boulenger fl. 1902
- Broussonet fl. 1782
- Brünnich fl. 1788
- Bussing fl. 1966 (Bussing & Bussing)
- Bussing fl. 1966 (x2)
- Byrne fl. 1909

== C ==
- Capello fl. 1864
- Castelnau fl. 1861
- Castle fl. 1968
- Cocco fl.1829
- Cohen fl. 1981
- Compagno fl. 1984
- Cramer fl. 1897
- Cressy fl. 1979
- Cuvier fl. 1829

== D ==
- Davies fl. 1950
- Day fl. 1873
- D'Aubrey fl. 1975
- DeFilippi fl. 1857
- De Kay fl. 1842
- Donndorff fl. 1789
- Duméril fl. 1865

== E ==
- Ebert fl. 1990
- Ege fl.1933
- Ehrenberg fl. 1899
- Esmark fl. 1871
- Euphrasen fl. 1790

== F ==
- Forsskål fl. 1775
- Forster fl. 1801
- Fowler fl. 1927
- Franca fl. 1960

== G ==
- Gaimard fl. 1824
- Garman fl. 1899
- Gibbs fl. 1960
- Giglioli fl.1884
- Gilbert fl. 1892
- Gilchrist fl. 1911
- Gill fl. 1884
- Giorna fl. 1809
- Gmelin fl. 1789
- Gomon fl. 1982
- Goode fl. 1895
- Griffith fl. 1834
- Gunnerus fl. 1765
- Günther fl. 1867

== H ==
- Hamilton fl. 1822
- Hamilton-Buchanan fl. 1822
- Hector fl. 1975
- Heemstra fl. 1980
- Hemprich fl. 1899
- Henle fl. 1841
- Herrmann fl. 1783
- Hjort fl. 1912
- Holt fl. 1909
- Hubbs fl. 1977
- Hulley fl. 1966
- Hutton fl. 1875

== I ==
- Iwamoto fl. 1977

== J ==
- Jenyns fl. 1842
- Johnson fl. 1862
- Jordan fl. 1898, 1902

== K ==
- Kannemeyer fl. 1984
- Kaup fl. 1856
- Klunzinger fl. 1871
- Koefoed fl. 1955
- Krefft fl. 1976 G. Krefft
- Kristnasamy fl. 1975
- Krøyer fl. 1845

== L ==
- Lacepède fl. 1803
- Latham fl. 1794
- Latreille fl. 1804
- Lay fl. 1839
- Leseuer fl. 1818
- Lesson fl. 1828
- Linnaeus fl. 1758
- Lloyd fl. 1908
- Lönnberg fl. 1905
- Lowe fl. 1840
- Lütken fl. 1892

== M ==
- Makushok fl. 1976
- Marshall – Norman Bertram Marshall (1915–1996) ichthyologist
- Matsubara fl. 1936, 1953
- Maul fl.1948
- McCann fl. 1980
- McClelland fl. 1844
- McCosker fl. 1882
- McCulloch fl. 1915
- McKnight fl. 1980
- McLeay fl. 1882
- Mead fl. 1959
- Merrett fl. 1973
- Millard – Naomi A. H. Millard (1914–1997) Hydroida
- Miyosi fl. 1939
- Mukhacheva fl. 1964
- Müller fl. 1834

== N ==
- Nafpaktitis (x2) fl. 1969
- Nakamura fl. 1955
- Nardo fl. 1827
- Nielsen fl. 1978
- Nodder fl. 1785
- Norman fl. 1922

== O ==
- Ogilby fl. 1899
- Olfers fl. 1831
- Osorio fl. 1917

== P ==
- Pappenheim fl. 1914
- Parin fl. 1972
- Parr fl. 1928
- Paxton fl. 1968
- Penrith fl. 1966
- Péron fl. 1822
- Peters fl. 1855
- Petit fl.1934
- Pietschmann fl. 1913
- Poey fl. 1861
- Post fl. 1973

== Q ==
- Quoy fl. 1824

== R ==
- Radcliffe fl. 1912
- Rafinesque fl. 1810
- Ramsay fl. 1881
- Randall fl. 1882
- Regan fl. 1913
- Reinhardt fl. 1825
- Richardson fl. 1848
- Risso fl. 1810
- Rofen fl. 1963
- Roule fl. 1922
- Rüppell fl. 1837
- Russell fl. 1979
- Ryder fl. 1883

== S ==
- Saint Hilaire fl. 1817
- Sazonov fl. 1980
- Schcherbachev fl.1976
- Schinz fl. 1822
- Schlegel fl. 1850
- Schmidt fl. 1912
- Schneider fl. 1923
- Schultz fl. 1953
- Scott fl. 1976
- Seale fl. 1906
- Shaw fl. 1785, 1791
- Sivertsen fl. 1945
- Smale fl. 1985
- Smith fl. 1980
- Smith fl. 1834
- Smith fl. 1912
- Snyder fl. 1902
- Springer fl. 1950
- Starks fl. 1904
- Stehman fl. 1990
- Steindachner fl. 1867
- Strömman fl. 1896
- Swart fl. 1923

== T ==
- Tåning fl. 1928 Åge Vedel Tåning (1890-1958)
- Taylor fl. 1982
- Temminck fl. 1850
- Thompson fl. 1911
- Thunberg fl. 1787
- Trewavas fl. 1929
- Trinov fl. 1988

== V ==
- Vahl fl. 1797
- Vaillant fl. 1888
- Valenciennes fl. 1841
- van Bonde fl. 1923
- van Hasselt fl. 1823
- Verany fl. 1857

== W ==
- Waite fl. 1916
- Wallace fl. 1967
- Waller fl. 1969
- Weber fl. 1913
- Welsh fl. 1923
- Whitley fl. 1931
- Williams fl. 1896
- Wongratana fl. 1983

== Z ==
- Zubrigg fl. 1976
- Zugmayer fl. 1911

== See also ==
- List of authors of names published under the ICZN
- List of authors of South African botanical taxa
- List of botanists by author abbreviation
- International Code of Zoological Nomenclature
