= Eudendrium capillaroides =

Scientific classification
- Kingdom: Animalia
- Phylum: Cnidaria
- Class: Hydrozoa
- Order: Anthoathecata
- Family: Eudendriidae
- Genus: Eudendrium
- Species: E. capillaroides

Binomial name
- Eudendrium capillaroides Schuchert, 2008

Synonyms
- Eudendrium teissieri Cabioch, 1970

Species of hydrozoan

Scanning electron micrographs of Eudendrium capillaroides showing polyp structures, nematocysts, and male and female reproductive organs.

Eudendrium capillaroides is a marine species of cnidaria, a hydroid (Hydrozoa) in the family Eudendriidae.
