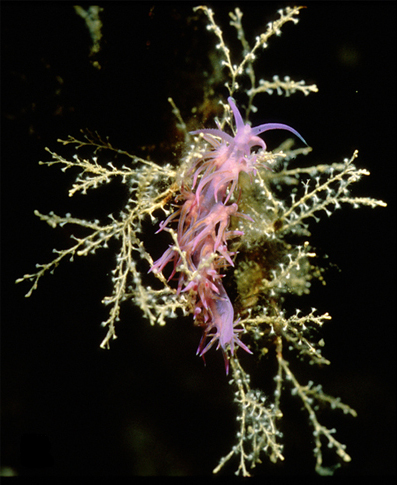
- The nudibranch Flabellina affinis feeding on Eudendrium ramosum

Scientific classification
- Kingdom: Animalia
- Phylum: Cnidaria
- Class: Hydrozoa
- Order: Anthoathecata
- Family: Eudendriidae
- Genus: Eudendrium
- Species: E. ramosum

Binomial name
- Eudendrium ramosum (Linnaeus, 1758)

Synonyms
- Eudendrium elsaeoswaldae Stechow, 1921; Eudendrium humile Allman, 1863; Eudendrium insigne Hincks, 1861; Halecium insigne; Tubularia ramosa Linnaeus, 1758; Tubularia trichoides Pallas, 1766

= Eudendrium ramosum =

Species of hydrozoan

Eudendrium ramosum, sometimes known as the tree hydroid, is a marine species of cnidaria, a hydroid (Hydrozoa) in the family Eudendriidae of the order Anthoathecata.

== Description ==
This is a colonial hydroid with a branching, tree-like form growing to a height of about 12 cm (5 in). The main branches divide into rather longer but narrower branches which bear single cup-shaped, feeding polyps known as hydranths near their tips. Each hydranth has about twenty tentacles but no nematophores. These hydranths are connected with the rest of the colony by hollow tubelike hydrocauli. Nearer the base of these stems are the male or female reproductive polyps, the gonophores, with each colony being either male or female. The male sporosacs grow on unreduced hydranths, there being up to five per hydranth, each with two chambers. The female gonophores grow on slightly reduced or normal sized hydranths, each gonozoid consisting of up to seven gonophores. There may be some encapsulated embryos attached to the lower stem. The hydranths and the spadix of the male sporosacs are red while the female gonophores are more orange.

== Distribution ==
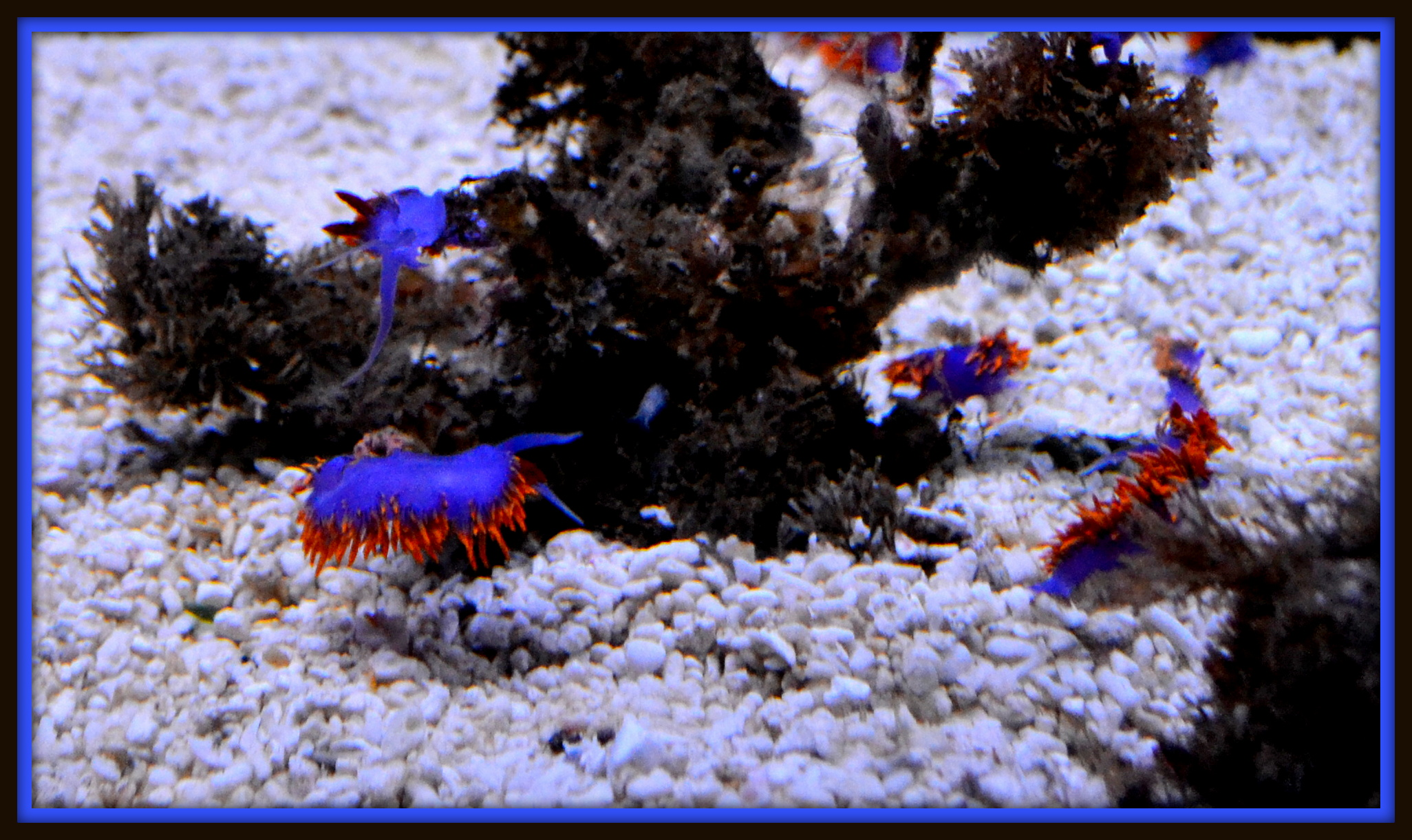
Purple and orange Spanish shawl nudibranchs feeding on Eudendrium ramosum

Eudendrium ramosum is present in the North Atlantic Ocean, the Gulf of Mexico and the Mediterranean Sea. In the western Atlantic, its range extends from Greenland and the Arctic Ocean to Florida and Texas. In the eastern Atlantic its range extends from the Arctic along the coasts of Europe to North Africa. It is common in the Mediterranean Sea. It has also been recorded from South Africa and Australia, however there is a very similar species, Eudendrium rameum with which it can be confused. Specimens from Arctic waters are very similar to the Mediterranean populations, but the southern hemisphere populations differ in the size and structure of the discharged mastigophore (stinging cell) capsules.

== Ecology ==
The hydroid colonies grow on a variety of hard substrates; they are more robust in shallow water and more lanky in deeper habitats. In the Mediterranean Sea, the colonies are present all year long with the exception of June, the breeding period being from July to February.
