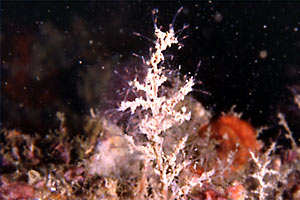

Scientific classification
- Domain: Eukaryota
- Kingdom: Animalia
- Phylum: Cnidaria
- Class: Hydrozoa
- Order: Anthoathecata
- Family: Eudendriidae
- Genus: Eudendrium
- Species: E. rameum

Binomial name
- Eudendrium rameum (Pallas, 1766)

Synonyms
- Eudendrium planum Bonnevie, 1898; Eudendrium stratum Bonnevie, 1898

= Eudendrium rameum =

Species of hydrozoan

Eudendrium rameum is a marine species of cnidaria, a hydroid (Hydrozoa) in the family Eudendriidae.
