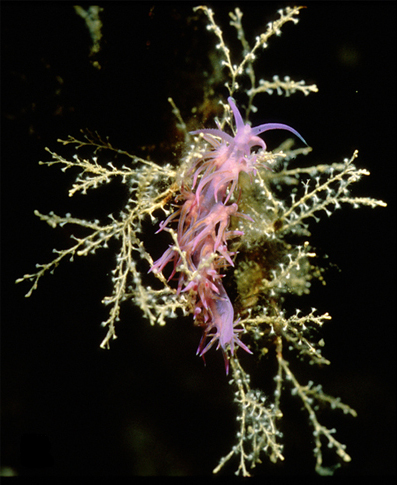

Scientific classification
- Domain: Eukaryota
- Kingdom: Animalia
- Phylum: Cnidaria
- Class: Hydrozoa
- Order: Anthoathecata
- Family: Eudendriidae
- Genus: Eudendrium
- Species: E. racemosum

Binomial name
- Eudendrium racemosum (Cavolini, 1785)

= Eudendrium racemosum =

Species of hydrozoan

Eudendrium racemosum is a marine species of cnidaria, a hydroid (Hydrozoa) in the family Eudendriidae. It was described by Cavolini in 1785. Hydroids are one of the most abundant organisms in hard-substratum benthic communities, more specifically in temperate seas, such as the Mediterranean. Similar to most modular organisms, they have high growth rates. In fact, E racemosum has been frequently found in northeastern Spain, specifically in Medes Islands, showing a maximum population density in summer with a minimal density during the winter (this is when it typically exists as dormant stolon). Their rapid growth coupled with their ability to store the necessary material to survive the winter is due to their efficient feeding and digestive methods.
