= Eudendrium carneum =

Scientific classification
- Kingdom: Animalia
- Phylum: Cnidaria
- Class: Hydrozoa
- Order: Anthoathecata
- Family: Eudendriidae
- Genus: Eudendrium
- Species: E. carneum

Binomial name
- Eudendrium carneum Clarke, 1882

Synonyms
- Eudendrium cunninghami Kirkpatrick, 1910

Species of hydrozoan

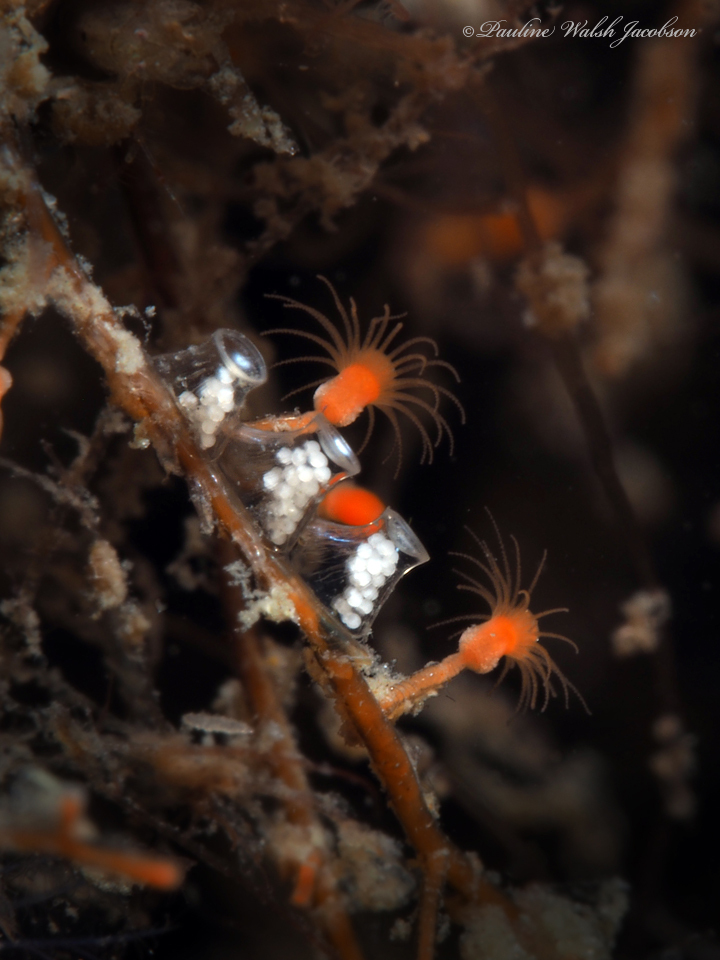
Eudendrium carneum

Eudendrium carneum is a marine species of cnidaria, a hydroid (Hydrozoa) in the family Eudendriidae. This species was first described in 1882 by Samuel Fessenden Clarke.
