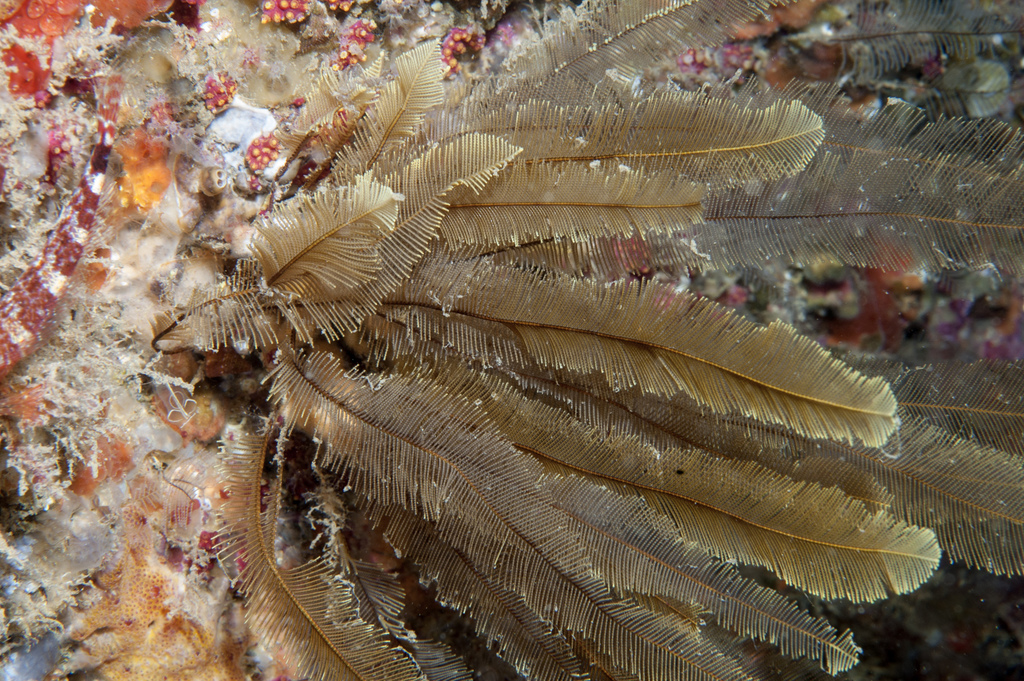
- Gymnangium montagui

Scientific classification
- Kingdom: Animalia
- Phylum: Cnidaria
- Class: Hydrozoa
- Order: Leptothecata
- Family: Aglaopheniidae
- Genus: Gymnangium; Hincks, 1874

Type species
- Gymnangium montagui

Synonyms
- Haliaria Stechow, 1921; Halicetta Stechow, 1921; Halicornaria Allman, 1874; Tropidopathes Silberfeld, 1909

= Gymnangium =

Genus of hydrozoans

Gymnangium is a genus of hydrozoans belonging to the family Aglaopheniidae. The genus was first described in 1874 by British naturalist, Thomas Hincks He describes the species of the genus as having unprotected gonothecae, whence the genus name, which derives in part from the Greek work for naked, γυμνός. In 1923, Eberhard Stechow, nominated the type species as Halicorniara montagui.

The genus has a cosmopolitan distribution. However, most Gymnangium species "occur in the tropical and subtropical waters of the Indian and Pacific Oceans".

== Species ==
WoRMS recognises the following species as accepted in the genus Gymnangium:

- Gymnangium africanum (Millard, 1958)
- Gymnangium allmani (Marktanner-Turneretscher, 1890)
- Gymnangium arcuatum (Lamouroux, 1816)
- Gymnangium ascidioides (Bale, 1882)
- Gymnangium aureum (Watson, 1973)
- Gymnangium australimage Watson, 2005
- Gymnangium baileyi (Bale, 1884)
- Gymnangium birostratum (Bale, 1914)
- Gymnangium bryani (Nutting, 1906)
- Gymnangium comes (Briggs, 1939)
- Gymnangium expansum (Jäderholm, 1903)
- Gymnangium explorationis Vervoort & Watson, 2003
- Gymnangium exsertum (Millard, 1962)
- Gymnangium ferlusi (Billard, 1901)
- Gymnangium goniodes (Briggs, 1915)
- Gymnangium hians (Busk, 1852)
- Gymnangium humile (Bale, 1884)
- Gymnangium ilicistomum (Bale, 1882)
- Gymnangium indivisum (Fraser, 1936)
- Gymnangium insigne (Allman, 1874)
- Gymnangium ishikawai (Stechow, 1908)
- Gymnangium japonicum Watson & Vervoort, 2001
- Gymnangium longirostre (Kirchenpauer, 1872)
- Gymnangium magnirostre (Nutting, 1927)
- Gymnangium millardae Ronowicz, 2017
- Gymnangium montagui (Billard, 1912)
- Gymnangium prolifer (Bale, 1882)
- Gymnangium pusillum Watson, 2018
- Gymnangium roretzii (Marktanner-Turneretscher, 1890)
- Gymnangium sibogae (Billard, 1913)
- Gymnangium sinuosum (Fraser, 1925)
- Gymnangium speciosum (Allman, 1877)
- Gymnangium superbum (Bale, 1882)
- Gymnangium tenuirostre (Nutting, 1927)
- Gymnangium thetidis (Ritchie, 1911)
- Gymnangium tubuliferum (Bale, 1914)
- Gymnangium undulatum Watson, 2000
- Gymnangium urceoliferum (Lamarck, 1816)
- Gymnangium vegae (Jäderholm, 1903)
