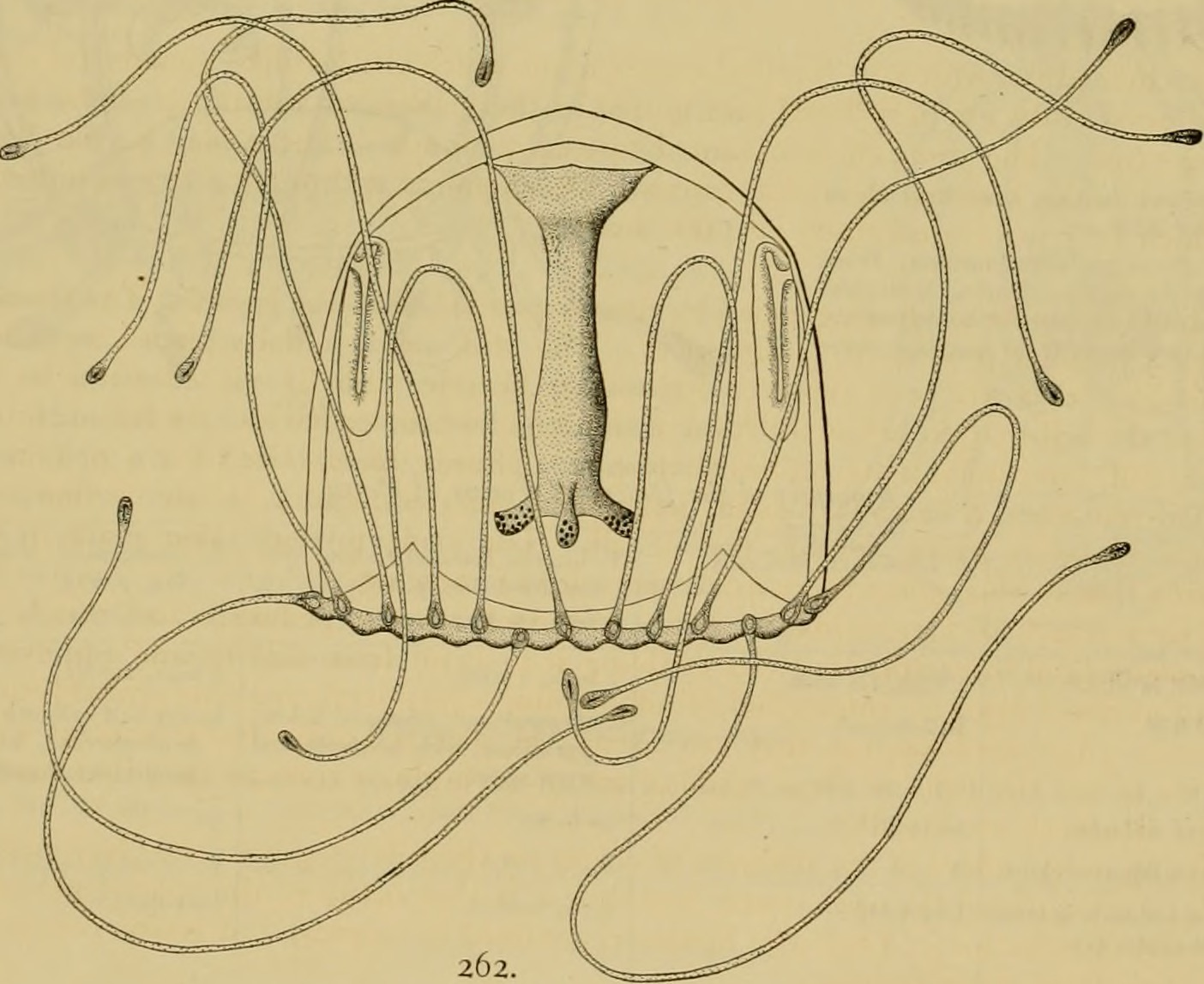

Scientific classification
- Domain: Eukaryota
- Kingdom: Animalia
- Phylum: Cnidaria
- Class: Hydrozoa
- Order: Trachymedusae
- Family: Rhopalonematidae
- Genus: Persa; McCrady, 1859
- Species: P. incolorata

Binomial name
- Persa incolorata McCrady, 1859

= Persa incolorata =

Species of hydrozoan

Persa incolorata is a species of deep-sea hydrozoan found in the monotypic genus Persa in the family Rhopalonematidae.
