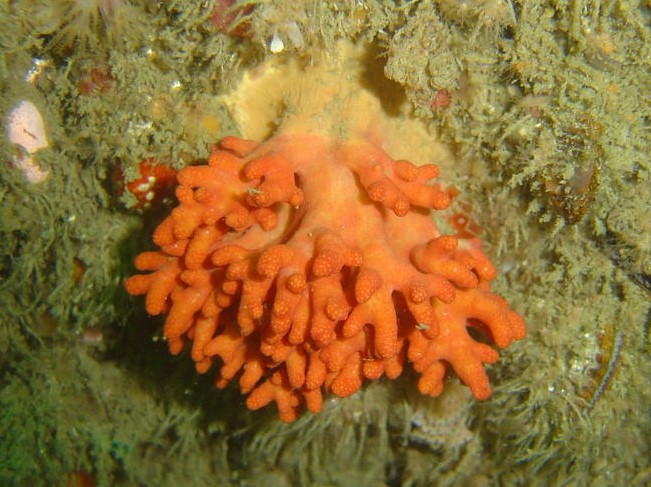

Scientific classification
- Kingdom: Animalia
- Phylum: Cnidaria
- Subphylum: Anthozoa
- Class: Octocorallia
- Order: Scleralcyonacea
- Family: Parasphaerascleridae
- Genus: Parasphaerasclera
- Species: P. valdiviae

Binomial name
- Parasphaerasclera valdiviae (Kukenthal, 1906)

Synonyms
- Alcyonium valdiviae Kukenthal, 1906

= Valdivian soft coral =

Species of coral

The Valdivian soft coral (Parasphaerasclera valdiviae) is a species of colonial leathery or soft coral in the family Alcyoniidae.

== Description ==
Valdivian soft corals grow in small colonies of between 1 and 11 cm in height and up to 10 cm in diameter. The colony has stubby branches extending from a conspicuous short thick trunk. The polyps are white, but the colony colour is variable from white to pink to orange or even red. Some colonies may be bi-coloured.

== Distribution ==
This species is known from the Cape Peninsula to northern KwaZulu-Natal off the South African coast, and is common in 14-18m of water, although it is found down to at least 30m. It is endemic to this area.

== Ecology ==
Research at Rhodes University has shown that chemicals in this soft coral may have anti-inflammatory properties.
