= Axel Elof Jäderholm =

Swedish zoologist and botanist (1868–1927)

Axel Elof Jäderholm (born 24 July 1868 in Söderhamn, died 5 March 1927 in Norrköping) was a Swedish zoologist and botanist.

== Biography ==
In 1888, Axel Elof Jäderholm entered the Uppsala University where he earned his undergraduate degree in 1892, and his doctorate in 1898. His doctoral research was about the South American Peperomia. Between 1903 and 1905, he worked on hydroid collections at the Swedish Museum of Natural History in Stockholm and the Imperial St Petersburg Academy of Sciences.

Axel Elof Jäderholm established two new genera and 69 new species of hydroids, most of which are still valid today. Five species of hydroids have been named in his honor.

The standard author abbreviation Jaderh. is used to indicate this person as the author when citing a botanical name.

== Species established by Jäderhlom ==
- Eudendrium caricum (1908)
- Candelabrum austrogeorgiae (1904)
- Candelabrum austro-georgiae (1905)

== Distinctions ==
- Knight of the Order of the Polar Star
