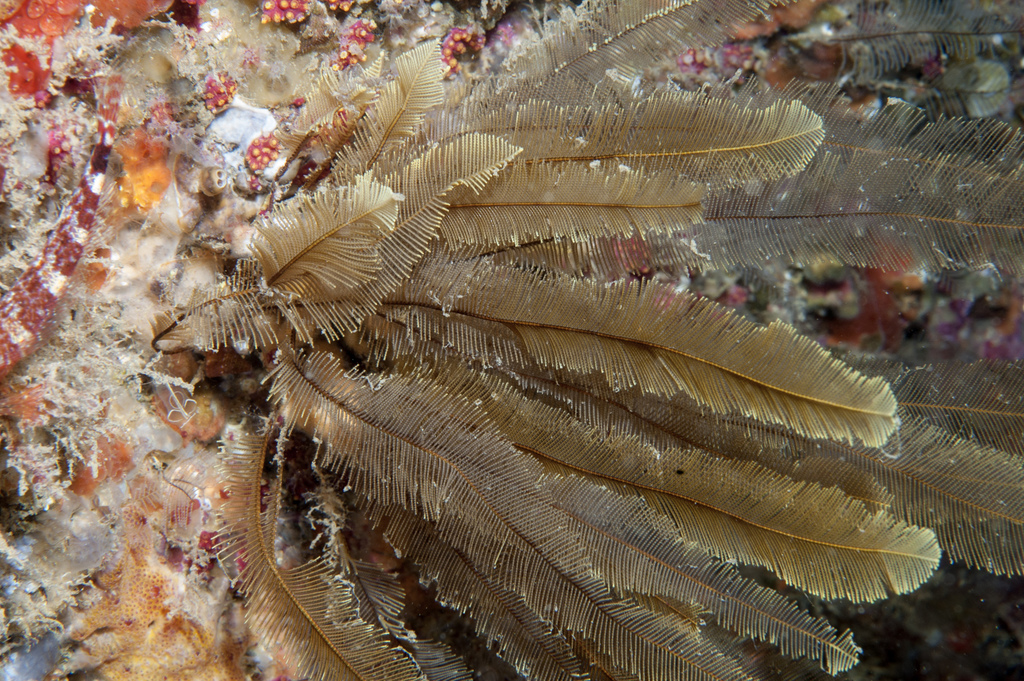

Scientific classification
- Kingdom: Animalia
- Phylum: Cnidaria
- Class: Hydrozoa
- Order: Leptothecata
- Family: Aglaopheniidae
- Genus: Gymnangium
- Species: G. montagui

Binomial name
- Gymnangium montagui (Billard, 1912)

Synonyms
- Halicornaria montagui Billard, 1912; Gymnangium pennatulum (Ellis & Solander, 1786); Sertularia pennatula Ellis & Solander, 1786

= Gymnangium montagui =

Species of cnidarian

Gymnangium montagui (common name - yellow feathers) is a species of cnidarian in the family, Aglaopheniidae, first described in 1912 by Armand Eugène Billard as Halicornaria montagui, from a specimen found off Roskoff.

GBIF data show it as being found in the coastal seas of Ireland, the UK, France, Spain and Portugal.
