= Myrionema (cnidarian) =

Scientific classification
- Kingdom: Animalia
- Phylum: Cnidaria
- Class: Hydrozoa
- Order: Anthoathecata
- Family: Eudendriidae
- Genus: Myrionema; Pictet, 1893

Genus of hydrozoans

Myrionema is a genus of hydrozoans belonging to the family Eudendriidae.

The species of this genus are found in Caribbean and Malesia.

Species:

- Myrionema amboinense Pictet, 1893
- Myrionema hargitti (Congdon, 1906)
