= Naomi A. H. Millard =

South African biologist

Naomi Adeline Helen Millard
- Born: Naomi Adeline Helen Bokenham; 14 July 1914; Green Point, Cape Town, South Africa
- Died: 12 June 1997 (aged 82)
- Occupation: biologist

Naomi Adeline Helen Millard, née Bokenham (16 July 1914, Green Point, Cape Town – 12 June 1997) was a South African biologist, one of the founders of the Zoological Society of South Africa and the Zoologica Africana Journal.

== Life ==
Naomi Adeline Helen Bokenham was on 16 July 1914 in Green Point, Cape Town. She graduated the Wynberg Girls' High School and entered the University of Cape Town in 1932, completing a master's degree in 1935.

In 1938, Bokenham married Arthur Millard and later settled in Pillans Road, Rosebank, raising a son and a daughter.

In 1942, Millard was awarded a Ph.D. degree, and in 1946, she was appointed to the permanent staff as a lecturer.

== Career ==
In 1951, Millard published Observations and experiments on fouling organisms in table Bay Harbour, south Africa in Transactions of the Royal Society of South Africa. By 1952, she was awarded a University Fellowship for the number and quality of her scientific publications. In 1958, Millard was promoted to a senior lectureship and in 1963 became a Fellow of the Royal Society of South Africa.

From 1961 to 1972 Millard was an Honorary secretary of the Zoological Society of South Africa Executive Council. In 1967, Millard published a work Hydrois from the south-west Indian Ocean. Annals of the South African Museum.

In 1971, she retired from the University and joined the staff of the South African Museum as marine biologist studying South African hydroids.

In 1972-1977 Millard was a Journal Editor of Zoological Society of South Africa Executive Council. Another Millard's work on hydroids was published in 1977 - Hydroids from the Kerguelen and Crozet shelves, collected by the cruise MD.03 of the Marion-Dufresne. Ann. S. Afr. Mus. During her career she described over 100 South African taxa.

In 1980, Millard was awarded the Gold Medal of the Zoological Society of Southern Africa.

Naomi A. H. Millard died on 12 June 1997.

== Selected works ==
- 1951 - Observations and experiments on fouling organisms in table Bay Harbour, South Africa.
- 1967 - Hydrois from the south-west Indian Ocean. Annals of the South African Museum.
- 1977 - Hydroids from the Kerguelen and Crozet shelves, collected by the cruise MD.03 of the Marion-Dufresne. Ann. S. Afr. Mus.

== Species named after Millard ==
- Gymnangium millardi Ronowicz sp. nov.
