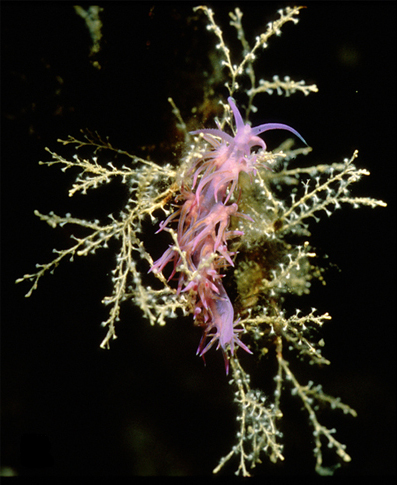
- Flabellina affinis feeding on a Eudendrium racemosus

Scientific classification
- Kingdom: Animalia
- Phylum: Cnidaria
- Class: Hydrozoa
- Order: Anthoathecata
- Suborder: Filifera
- Family: Eudendriidae; L. Agassiz, 1862

Synonyms
- Urashimeidae

= Eudendriidae =

Family of hydrozoans

Eudendriidae is a taxonomic family of hydroids (Hydrozoa). The family contains around 85 species.

== Genera ==
- Eudendrium Ehrenberg, 1834
- Myrionema Pictet, 1893
