= Salvati =

Salvati is a surname.

== People from the surname ==
- Jim Salvati (born 1957), American painter
- Joe Salvati, American wrongfully convicted of murder
- Marc Salvati (born 1983), English footballer
- Paolo Salvati (1939–2014), Italian painter
- Sergio Salvati (1934–2025), Italian cinematographer
- Simone Salvati (born 1973), Italian snowboarder

== See also ==
- Mahmoud Salavati (born 1953), Iranian cleric
- Favartia salvati
- Joculator salvati
- Lobophytum salvati
- Qaleh-ye Salvati, Iranian village
