= Lobophytum jaeckeli =

Scientific classification
- Kingdom: Animalia
- Phylum: Cnidaria
- Subphylum: Anthozoa
- Class: Octocorallia
- Order: Malacalcyonacea
- Family: Sarcophytidae
- Genus: Lobophytum
- Species: L. jaeckeli

Binomial name
- Lobophytum jaeckeli Tixier-Durivault, 1957

Species of soft coral

Lobophytum jaeckeli is a species of soft coral in the family Alcyoniidae.
