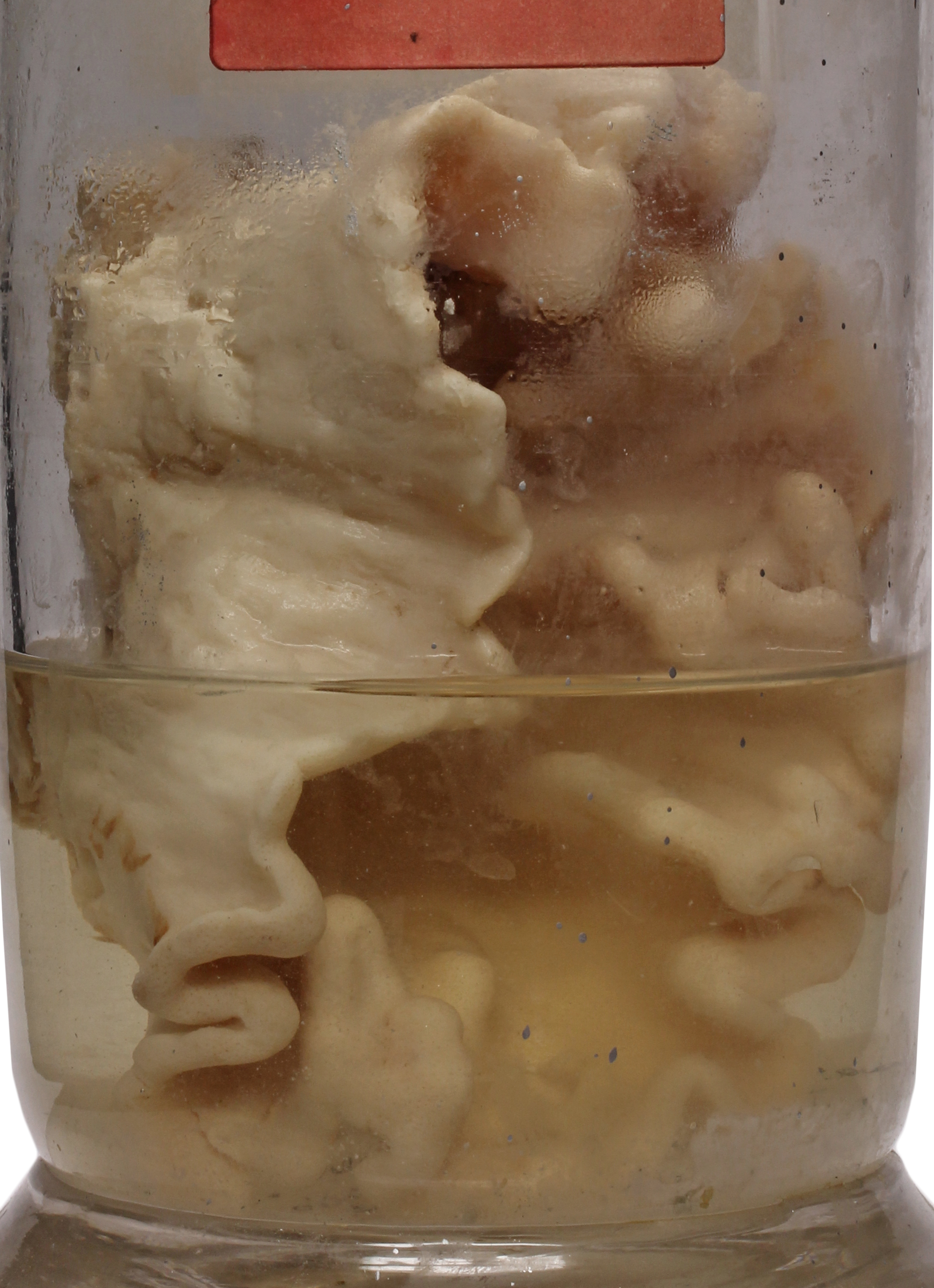
- Preserved holotype

Scientific classification
- Kingdom: Animalia
- Phylum: Cnidaria
- Subphylum: Anthozoa
- Class: Octocorallia
- Order: Malacalcyonacea
- Family: Sarcophytidae
- Genus: Lobophytum
- Species: L. venustum

Binomial name
- Lobophytum venustum Tixier-Durivault, 1957

= Lobophytum venustum =

Species of soft coral

Lobophytum venustum is a species of soft coral in the family Alcyoniidae. First described from Aldabra (the Seychelles), it occurs in the Indian (including the Red Sea) and Pacific Oceans.

Individual polyps measure 8–10 cm (3.1–3.9 in).
