= Lobophytum densum =

Scientific classification
- Kingdom: Animalia
- Phylum: Cnidaria
- Subphylum: Anthozoa
- Class: Octocorallia
- Order: Malacalcyonacea
- Family: Sarcophytidae
- Genus: Lobophytum
- Species: L. densum

Binomial name
- Lobophytum densum Whitelegge, 1897 and Tixier-Durivault, 1970 (separately)

Species of soft coral

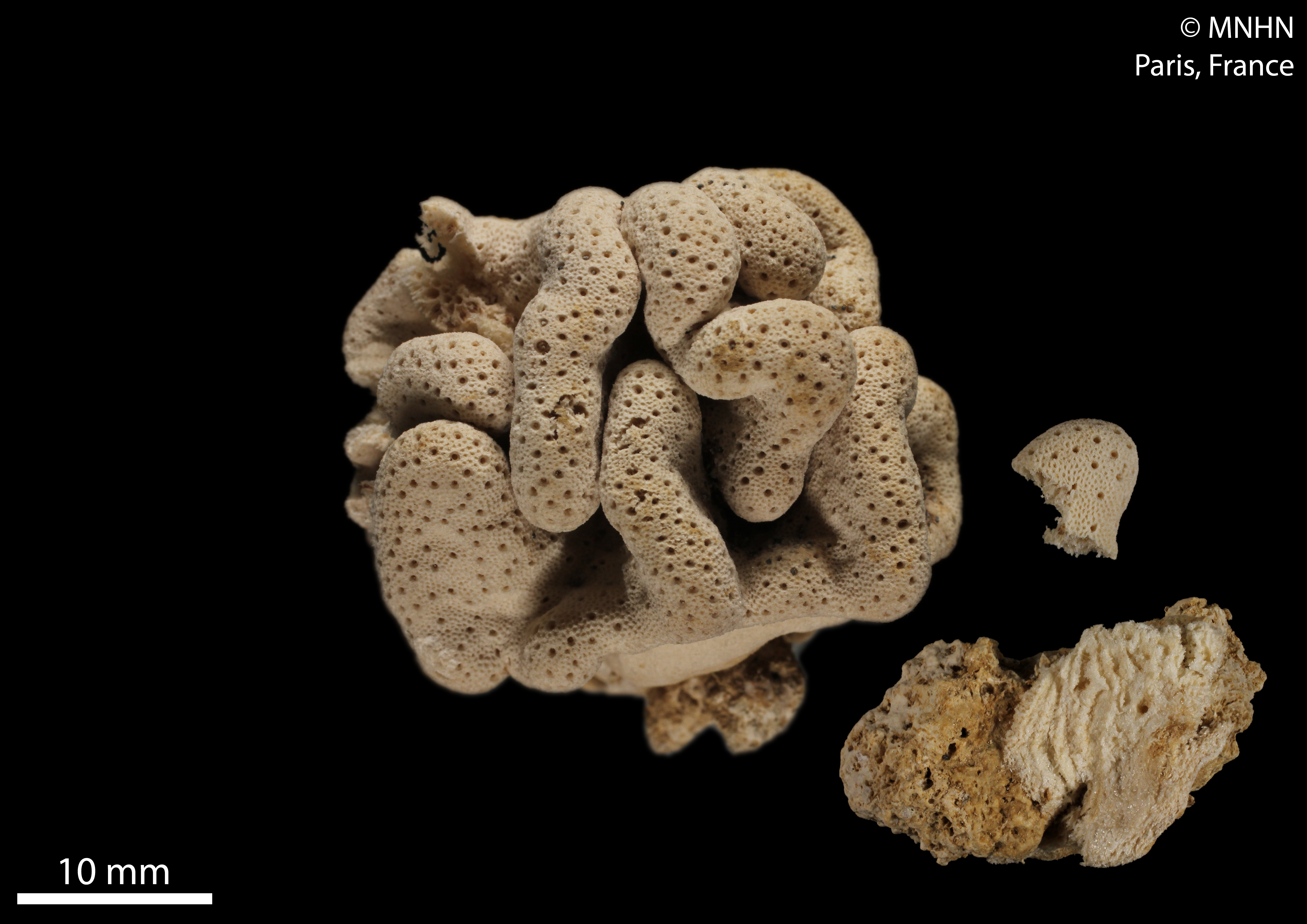
Specimen

Lobophytum densum is a coral species of the genus Lobophytum.
