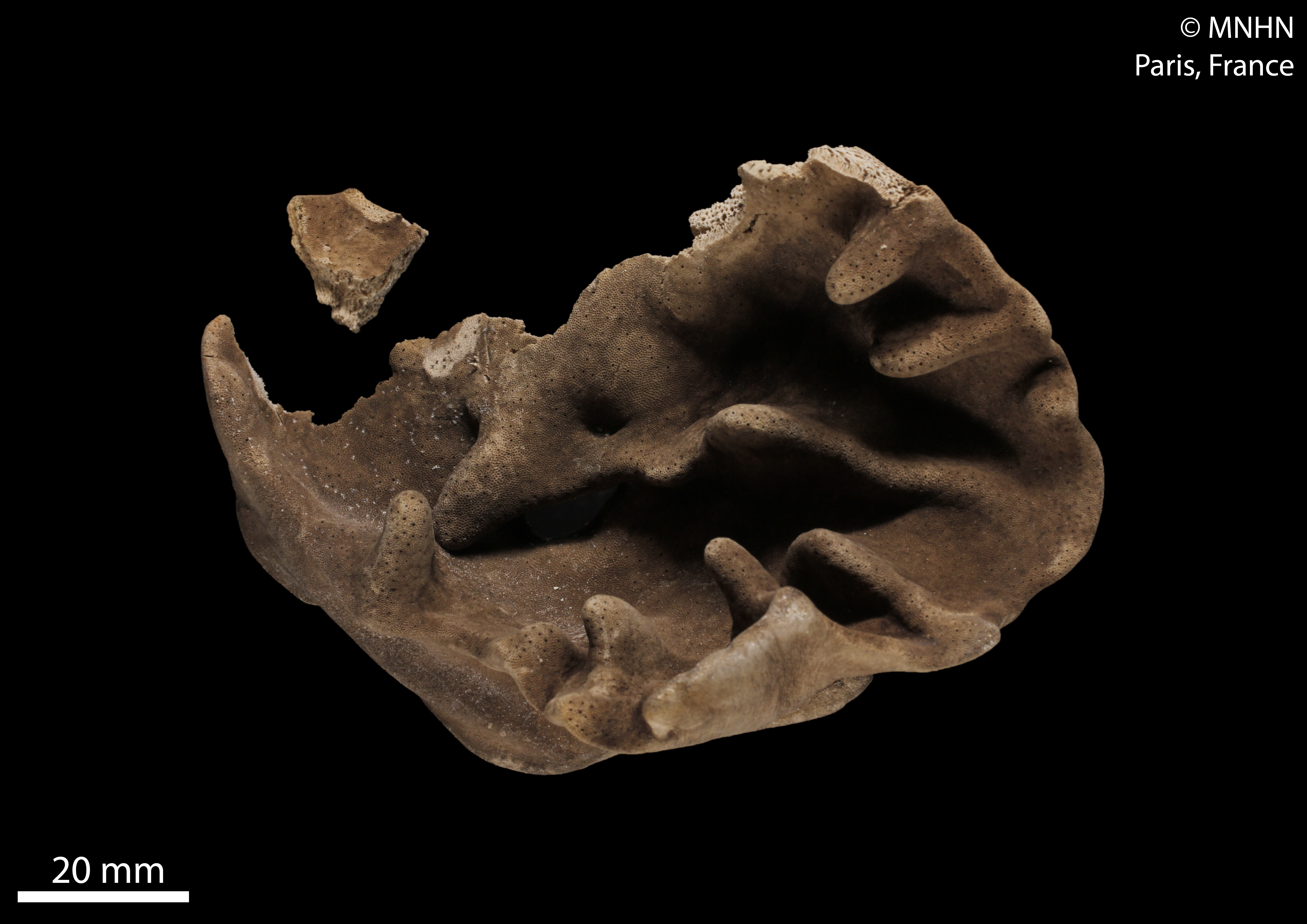
- Lobophytum planum

Scientific classification
- Kingdom: Animalia
- Phylum: Cnidaria
- Subphylum: Anthozoa
- Class: Octocorallia
- Order: Malacalcyonacea
- Family: Sarcophytidae
- Genus: Lobophytum
- Species: L. planum

Binomial name
- Lobophytum planum Tixier-Durivault, 1970

= Lobophytum planum =

Species of soft coral

Lobophytum planum is a species of soft coral in the family Alcyoniidae and the genus Lobophytum.
