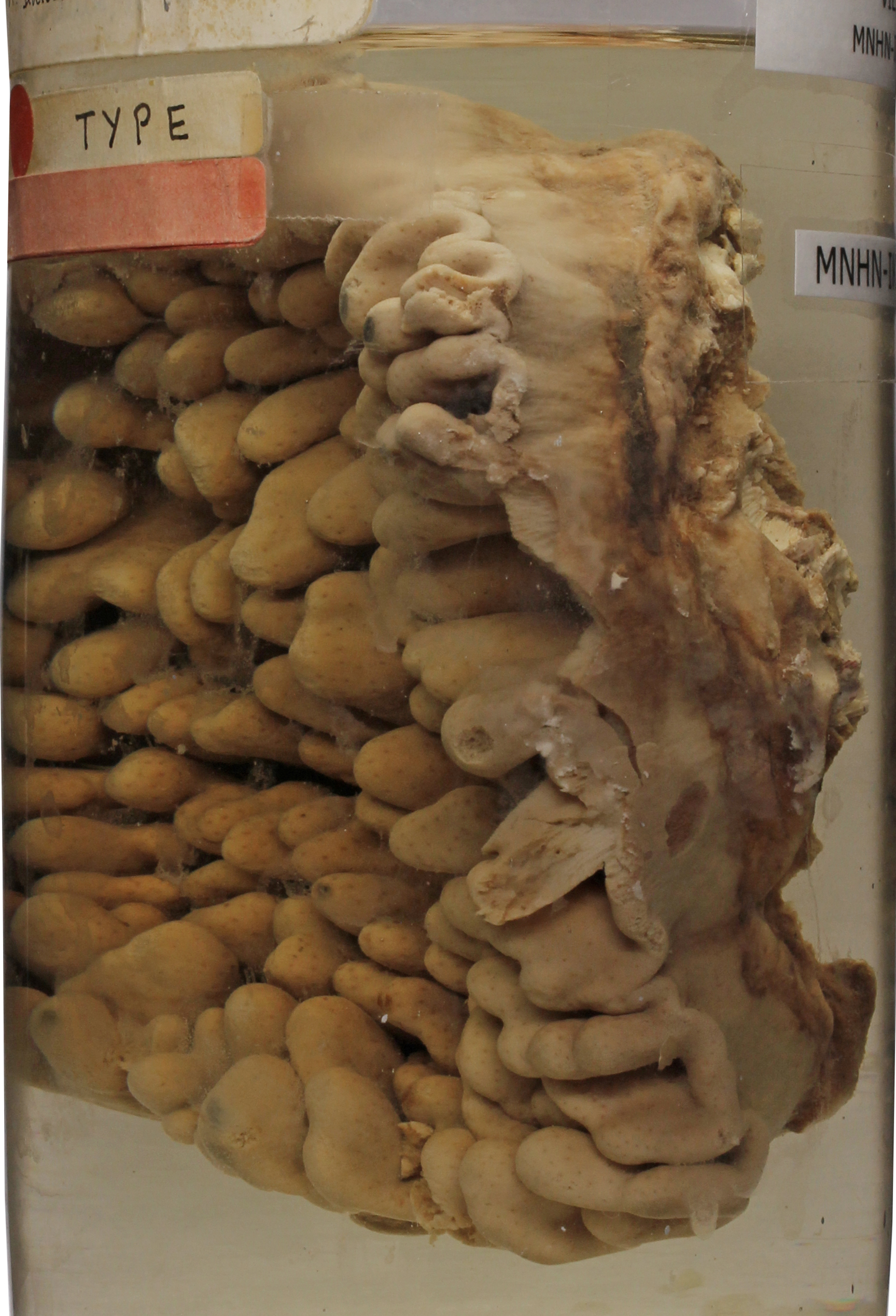

Scientific classification
- Kingdom: Animalia
- Phylum: Cnidaria
- Subphylum: Anthozoa
- Class: Octocorallia
- Order: Malacalcyonacea
- Family: Sarcophytidae
- Genus: Lobophytum
- Species: L. strictum

Binomial name
- Lobophytum strictum Tixier-Durivault, 1957

= Lobophytum strictum =

Species of soft coral

Lobophytum strictum is a species of the genus Lobophytum.
