= Lobophytum crassum =

Scientific classification
- Kingdom: Animalia
- Phylum: Cnidaria
- Subphylum: Anthozoa
- Class: Octocorallia
- Order: Malacalcyonacea
- Family: Sarcophytidae
- Genus: Lobophytum
- Species: L. crassum

Binomial name
- Lobophytum crassum von Marenzeller, 1886

Species of soft coral

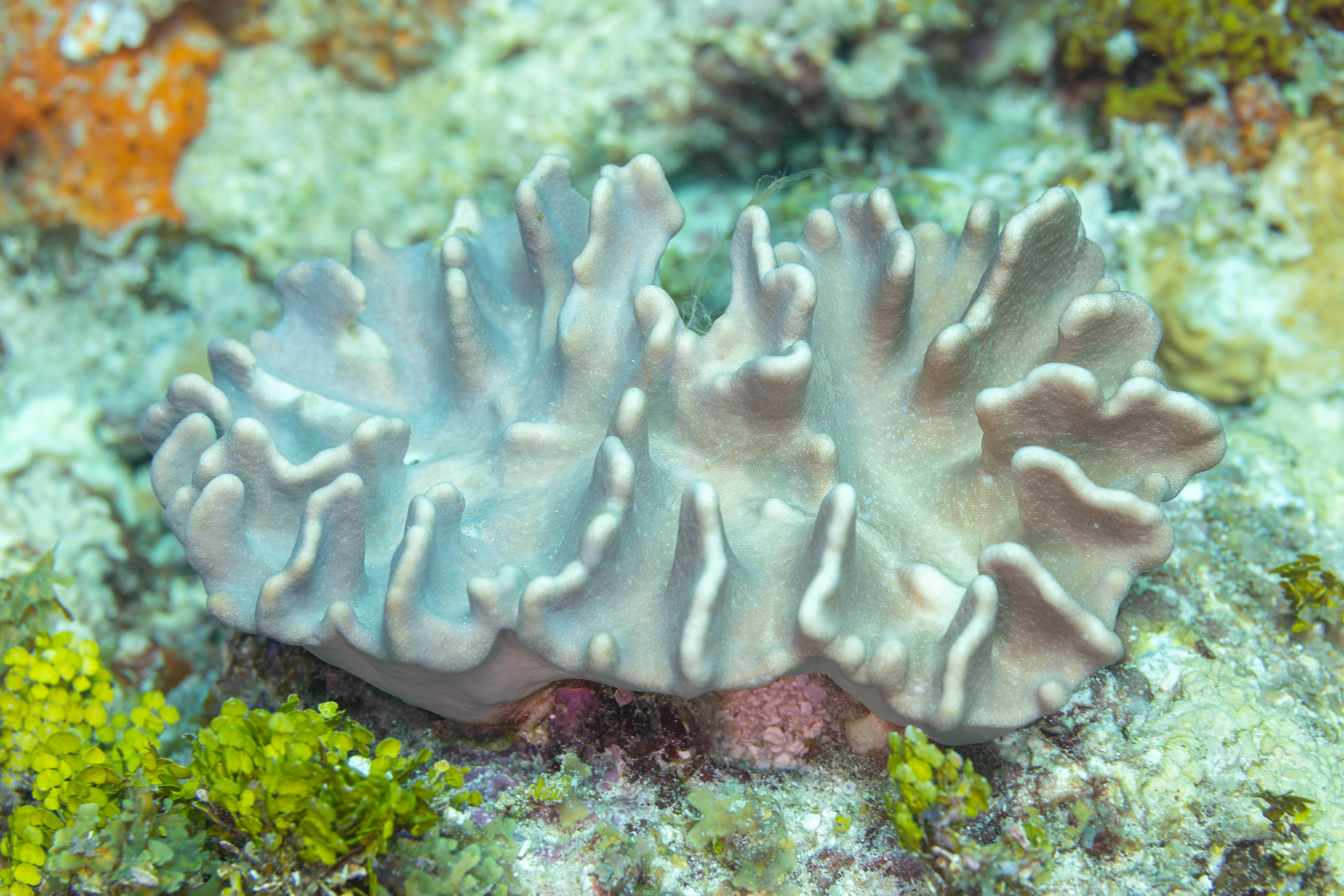
Coral (Lobophytum crassum), Zanzibar, Tanzania.

Lobophytum crassum is a coral species of the genus Lobophytum.
