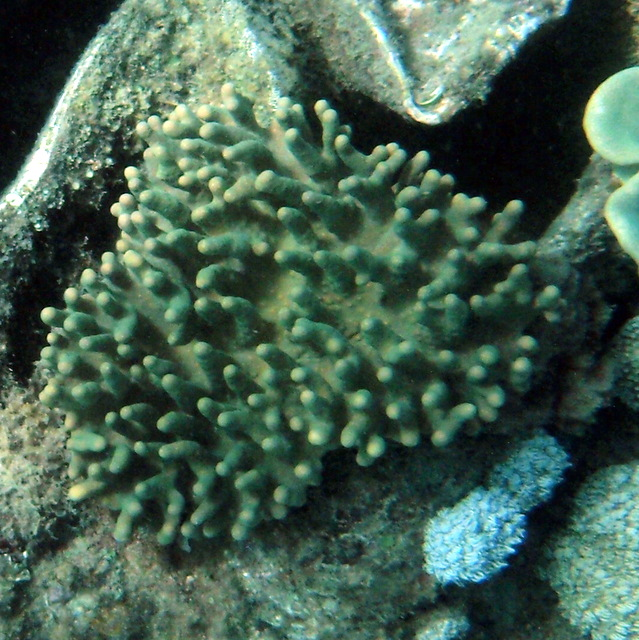

Scientific classification
- Kingdom: Animalia
- Phylum: Cnidaria
- Subphylum: Anthozoa
- Class: Octocorallia
- Order: Malacalcyonacea
- Family: Sarcophytidae
- Genus: Lobophytum
- Species: L. pauciflorum

Binomial name
- Lobophytum pauciflorum Ehrenberg, 1834

= Lobophytum pauciflorum =

Species of soft coral

Lobophytum pauciflorum is a species of soft coral in the family Alcyoniidae and the genus Lobophytum.
