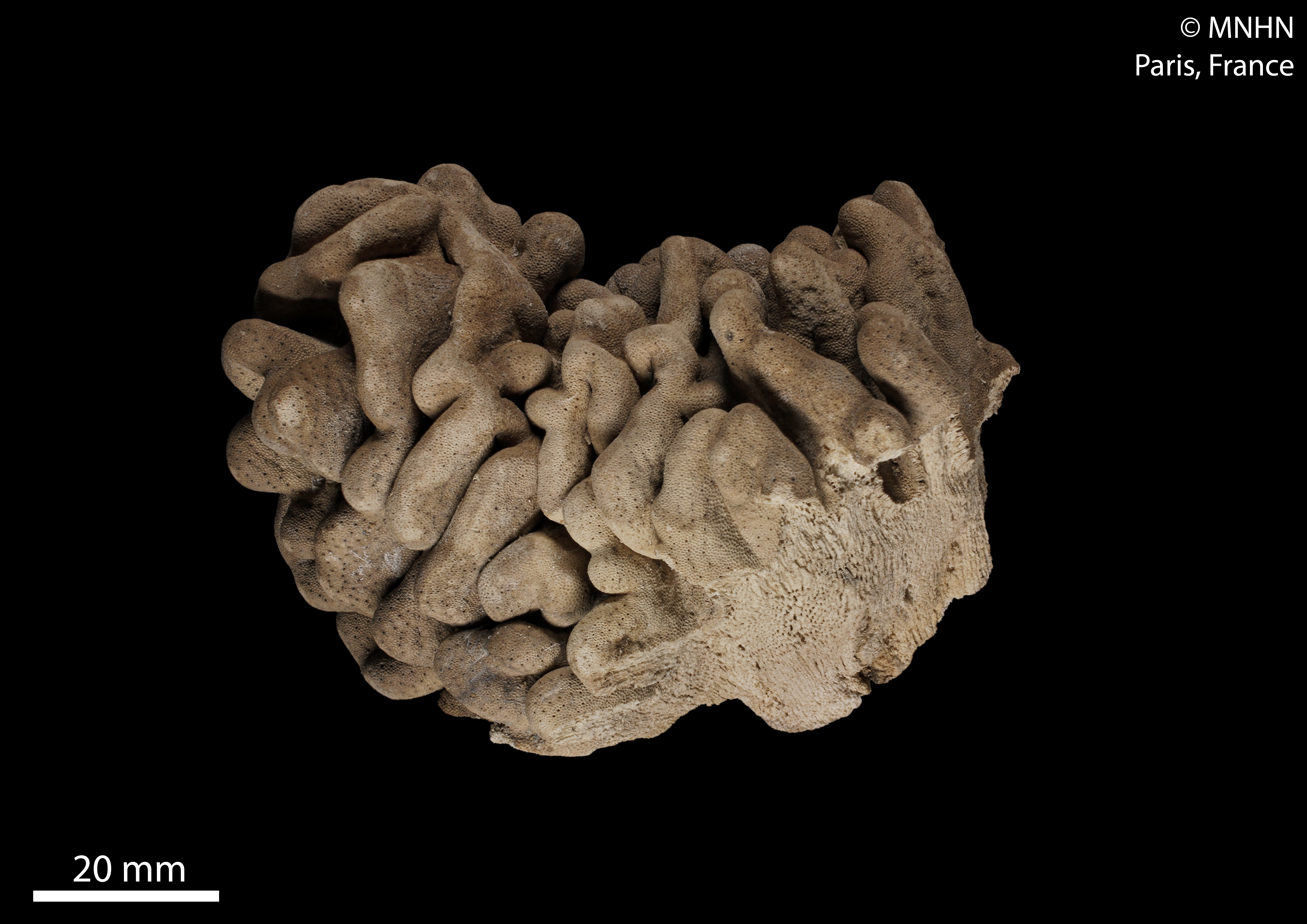

Scientific classification
- Kingdom: Animalia
- Phylum: Cnidaria
- Subphylum: Anthozoa
- Class: Octocorallia
- Order: Malacalcyonacea
- Family: Sarcophytidae
- Genus: Lobophytum
- Species: L. michaelae

Binomial name
- Lobophytum michaelae Tixier-Durivault, 1956

= Lobophytum michaelae =

Species of soft coral

Lobophytum michaelae is a coral species of the genus Lobophytum.
