= Lobophytum hsiehi =

Scientific classification
- Kingdom: Animalia
- Phylum: Cnidaria
- Subphylum: Anthozoa
- Class: Octocorallia
- Order: Malacalcyonacea
- Family: Sarcophytidae
- Genus: Lobophytum
- Species: L. hsiehi

Binomial name
- Lobophytum hsiehi Benayahu & Ofwegen, 2011

Species of soft coral

Lobophytum hsiehi is a coral species of the genus Lobophytum found is shallow waters in the Indo-pacific.
