= Lobophytum spicodigitum =

Scientific classification
- Kingdom: Animalia
- Phylum: Cnidaria
- Subphylum: Anthozoa
- Class: Octocorallia
- Order: Malacalcyonacea
- Family: Sarcophytidae
- Genus: Lobophytum
- Species: L. spicodigitum

Binomial name
- Lobophytum spicodigitum Li, 1984

Species of soft coral

Lobophytum spicodigitum is a species of soft coral in the genus Lobophytum.
