= Lobophytum sarcophytoides =

Scientific classification
- Kingdom: Animalia
- Phylum: Cnidaria
- Subphylum: Anthozoa
- Class: Octocorallia
- Order: Malacalcyonacea
- Family: Sarcophytidae
- Genus: Lobophytum
- Species: L. sarcophytoides

Binomial name
- Lobophytum sarcophytoides Moser,1919

Species of soft coral

Lobophytum sarcophytoides is a soft coral known for two new cembrane-type diterpenoids, lobophytins and four new prostaglandins from a specimen.

== Chemistry ==
SYSU-MS001, a specimen of L. sarcophytoides, was collected in the South China Sea. Biologists extracted the specimen and discovered two new cembrane-type diterpenoids, named lobophytins, as well as four new prostaglandins. Additionally, the chemical Sarcophytolin D has been taken from other specimens of the species.
