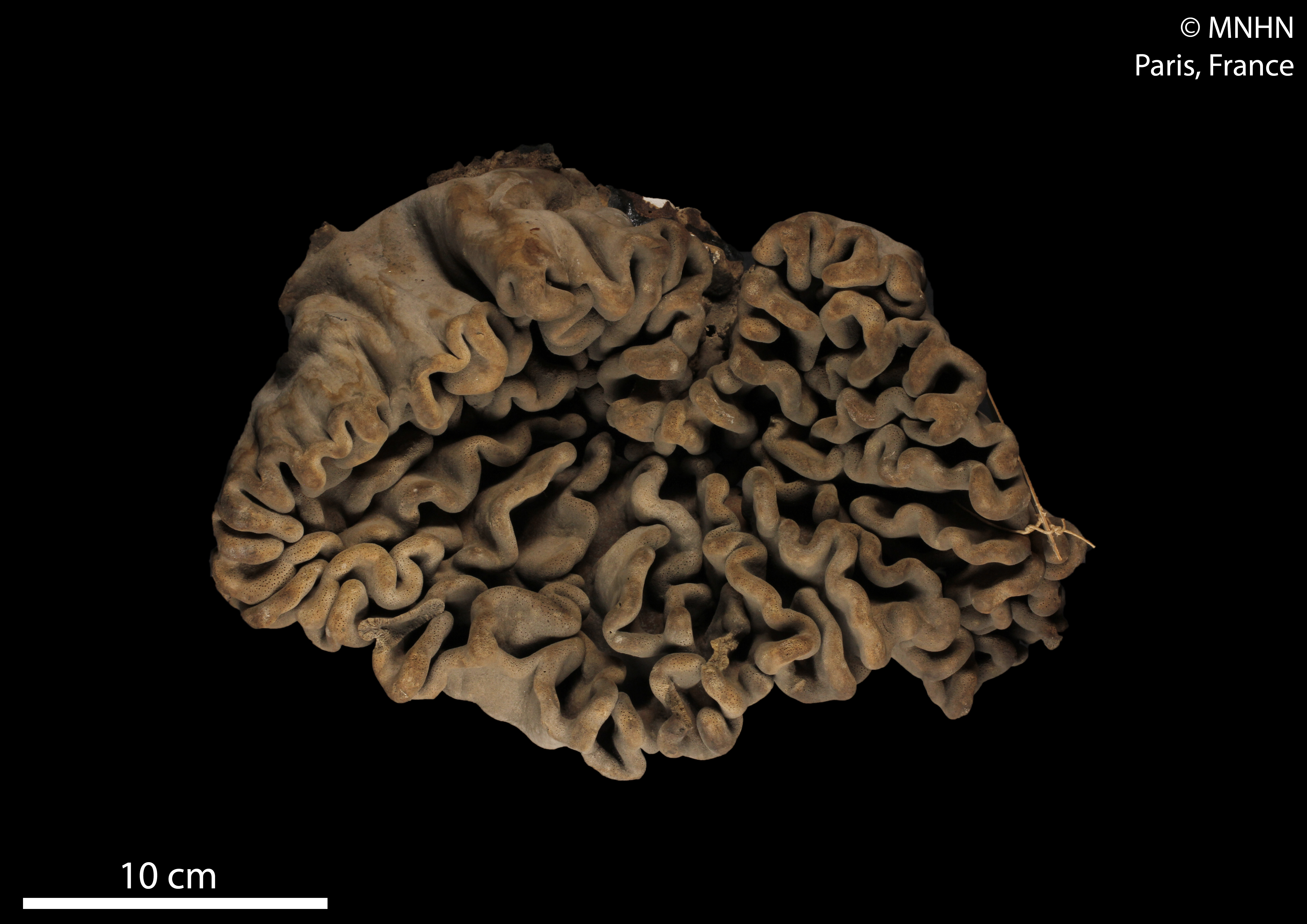
- Lobophytum altum at Muséum national d'histoire naturelle, France.

Scientific classification
- Kingdom: Animalia
- Phylum: Cnidaria
- Subphylum: Anthozoa
- Class: Octocorallia
- Order: Malacalcyonacea
- Family: Sarcophytidae
- Genus: Lobophytum
- Species: L. altum

Binomial name
- Lobophytum altum Tixier-Durivault, 1956

= Lobophytum altum =

Species of coral

Lobophytum altum is a species of the genus Lobophytum.
