= Lobophytum latilobatum =

Scientific classification
- Kingdom: Animalia
- Phylum: Cnidaria
- Subphylum: Anthozoa
- Class: Octocorallia
- Order: Malacalcyonacea
- Family: Sarcophytidae
- Genus: Lobophytum
- Species: L. latilobatum

Binomial name
- Lobophytum latilobatum Verseveldt, 1971

Species of soft coral

Lobophytum latilobatum is a species of soft coral in the family Alcyoniidae.
