= Lobophytum pygmapedium =

Scientific classification
- Kingdom: Animalia
- Phylum: Cnidaria
- Subphylum: Anthozoa
- Class: Octocorallia
- Order: Malacalcyonacea
- Family: Sarcophytidae
- Genus: Lobophytum
- Species: L. pygmapedium

Binomial name
- Lobophytum pygmapedium Li, 1984

Species of soft coral

Lobophytum pygmapedium is a species of soft corals in the genus Lobophytum.
