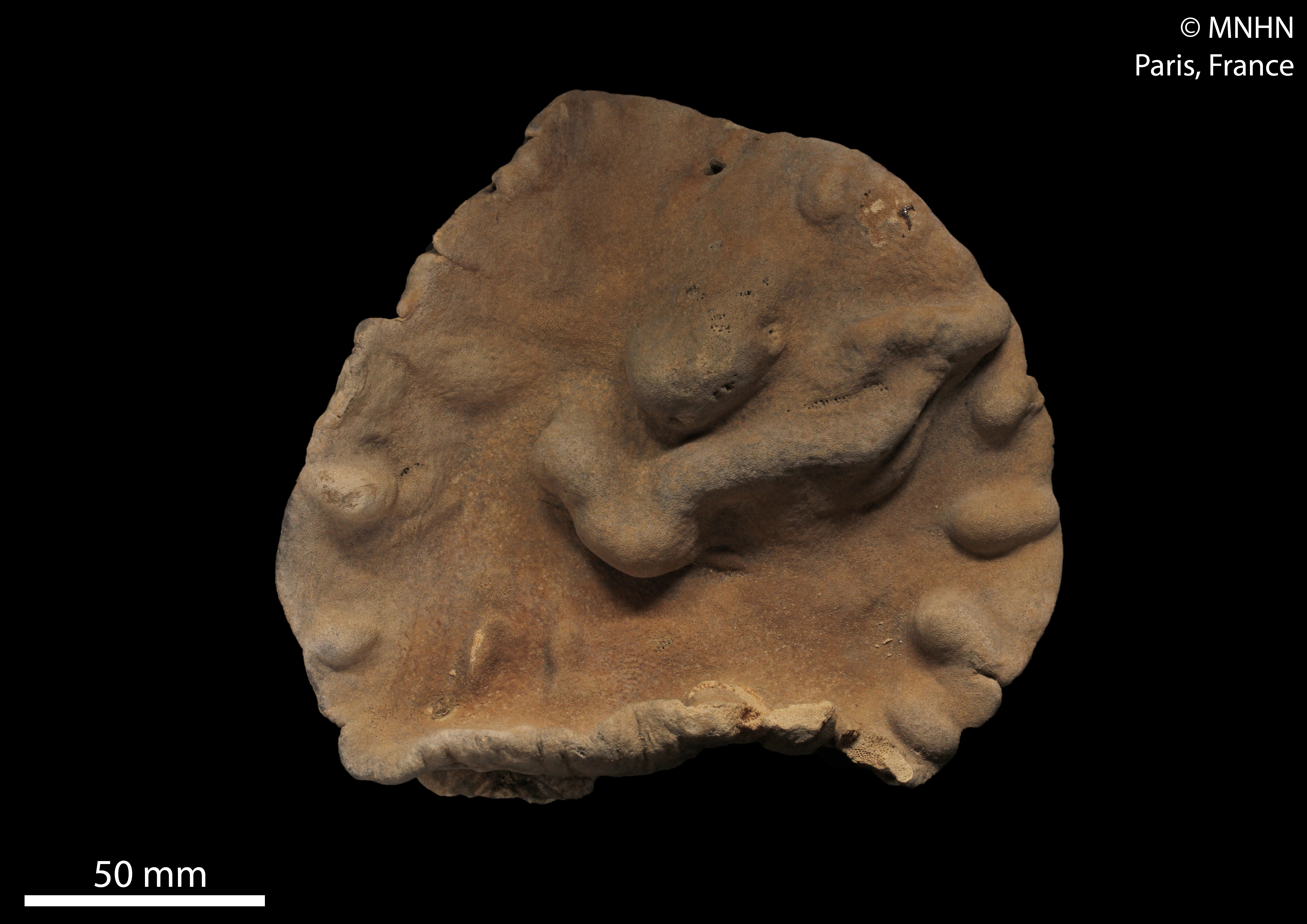
- Lobophytum patulum (MNHN-IK-2015-2040)

Scientific classification
- Kingdom: Animalia
- Phylum: Cnidaria
- Subphylum: Anthozoa
- Class: Octocorallia
- Order: Malacalcyonacea
- Family: Sarcophytidae
- Genus: Lobophytum
- Species: L. patulum

Binomial name
- Lobophytum patulum Tixier-Durivault, 1956

= Lobophytum patulum =

Species of soft coral

Lobophytum patulum is a species of soft coral in the family Alcyoniidae and the genus Lobophytum.
