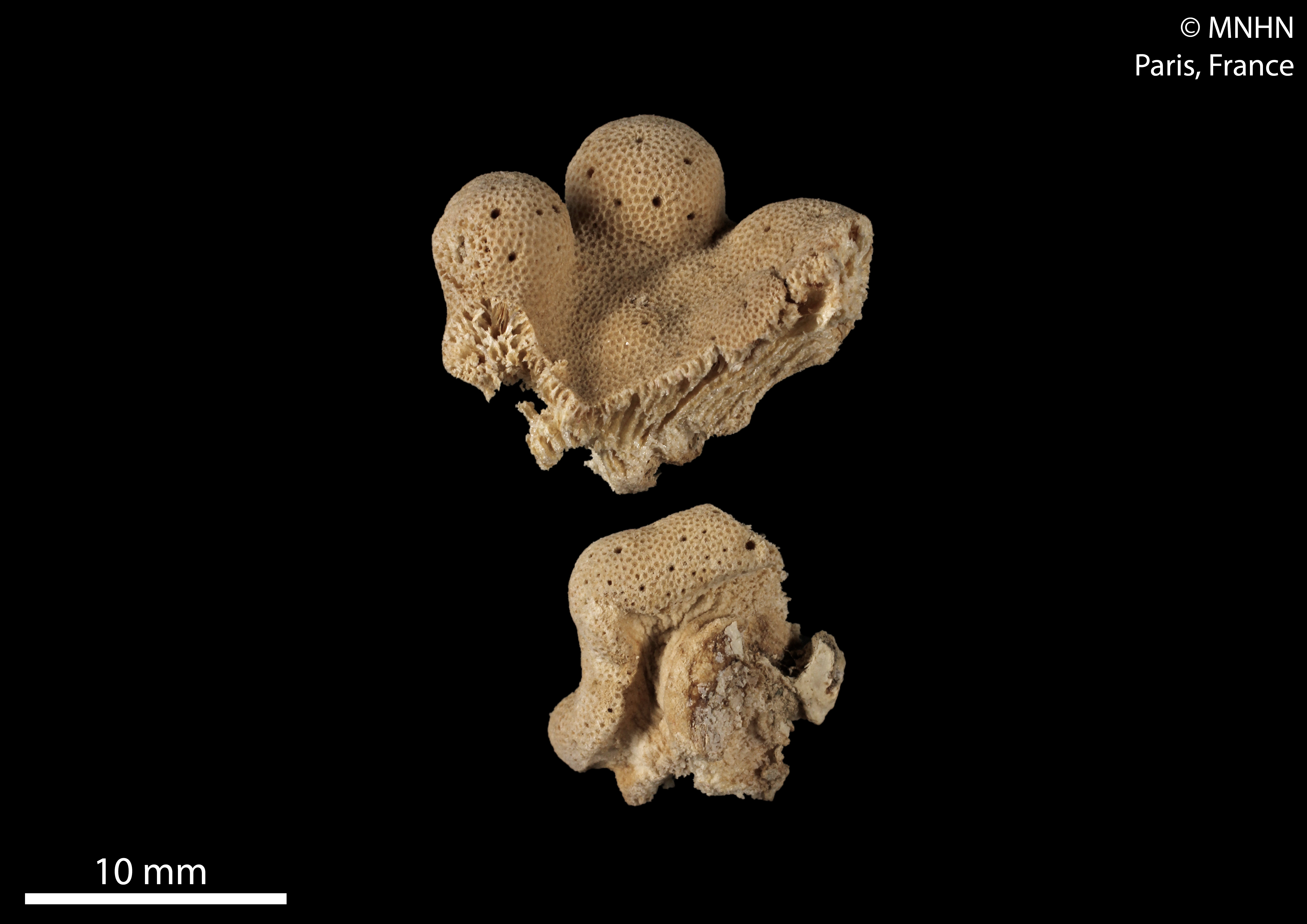

Scientific classification
- Kingdom: Animalia
- Phylum: Cnidaria
- Subphylum: Anthozoa
- Class: Octocorallia
- Order: Malacalcyonacea
- Family: Sarcophytidae
- Genus: Lobophytum
- Species: L. pusillum

Binomial name
- Lobophytum pusillum Tixier-Durivault, 1970

= Lobophytum pusillum =

Species of soft coral

Lobophytum pusillum is a coral species of the genus Lobophytum.
