= Lobophytum hapalolobatum =

Scientific classification
- Kingdom: Animalia
- Phylum: Cnidaria
- Subphylum: Anthozoa
- Class: Octocorallia
- Order: Malacalcyonacea
- Family: Sarcophytidae
- Genus: Lobophytum
- Species: L. hapalolobatum

Binomial name
- Lobophytum hapalolobatum Verseveldt, 1983

Species of soft coral

Lobophytum hapalolobatum is a coral species of the genus Lobophytum.
