= Lobophytum caputospiculatum =

Scientific classification
- Kingdom: Animalia
- Phylum: Cnidaria
- Subphylum: Anthozoa
- Class: Octocorallia
- Order: Malacalcyonacea
- Family: Sarcophytidae
- Genus: Lobophytum
- Species: L. caputospiculatum

Binomial name
- Lobophytum caputospiculatum (C.Li, 1984)

Species of soft coral

Lobophytum caputospiculatum is a species of the genus Lobophytum.
