= Lobophytum prostratum =

Scientific classification
- Kingdom: Animalia
- Phylum: Cnidaria
- Subphylum: Anthozoa
- Class: Octocorallia
- Order: Malacalcyonacea
- Family: Sarcophytidae
- Genus: Lobophytum
- Species: L. prostratum

Binomial name
- Lobophytum prostratum Verseveldt & Benayahu, 1983

Species of soft coral

Lobophytum prostratum is a species of soft corals in the family Alcyoniidae and the genus Lobophytum.
