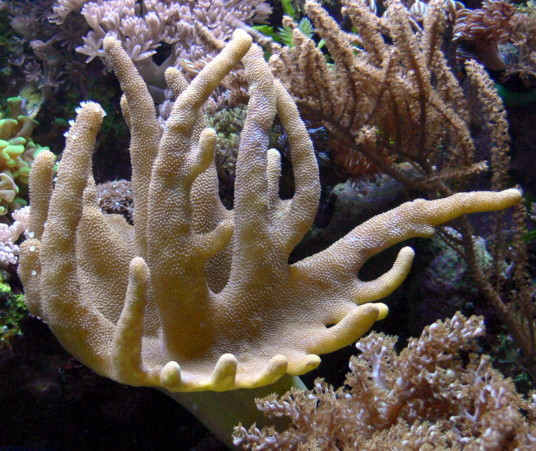

Scientific classification
- Kingdom: Animalia
- Phylum: Cnidaria
- Subphylum: Anthozoa
- Class: Octocorallia
- Order: Malacalcyonacea
- Family: Sarcophytidae
- Genus: Lobophytum; Marenzeller, 1886

= Lobophytum =

Genus of corals

Lobophytum is a genus of soft corals commonly known as devil's hand corals or devil's hand leather corals.

== Habitat and range ==
Lobophytum species can be found in shallow water throughout a wide area of the tropical Indo-Pacific.

== Species ==
- Lobophytum altum Tixier-Durivault, 1956
- Lobophytum anomolum Li, 1984
- Lobophytum batarum Moser, 1919
- Lobophytum borbonicum von Marenzeller, 1886
- Lobophytum caputospiculatum Li, 1984
- Lobophytum catalai Tixier-Durivault, 1957
- Lobophytum compactum Tixier-Durivault, 1956
- Lobophytum crassodigitum Li, 1984
- Lobophytum crassospiculatum (Moser, 1919)
- Lobophytum crassum von Marenzeller, 1886
- Lobophytum crebliplicatum von Marenzeller, 1886
- Lobophytum cristagalli von Marenzeller, 1886
- Lobophytum cristatum Tixier-Durivault, 1970
- Lobophytum cryptocormum Verseveldt & Tursch, 1979
- Lobophytum delectum Tixier-Durivault, 1966
- Lobophytum densum Tixier-Durivault, 1970
- Lobophytum denticulatum Tixier-Durivault, 1956
- Lobophytum depressum Tixier-Durivault, 1966
- Lobophytum durum Tixier-Durivault, 1956
- Lobophytum gazellae Moser, 1919
- Lobophytum hapalolobatum Verseveldt, 1983
- Lobophytum hirsutum Tixier-Durivault, 1956
- Lobophytum hsiehi Benayahu & Ofwegen, 2011
- Lobophytum ignotum Tixier-Durivault, 1956
- Lobophytum irregulare Tixier-Durivault, 1970
- Lobophytum jaeckeli Tixier-Durivault, 1956
- Lobophytum jasparsi van Ofwegen, 1999
- Lobophytum laevigatum Tixier-Durivault, 1956
- Lobophytum lamarcki Tixier-Durivault, 1956
- Lobophytum latilobatum Verseveldt, 1971
- Lobophytum legitimum Tixier-Durivault, 1970
- Lobophytum lighti Moser, 1919
- Lobophytum longispiculatum Li, 1984
- Lobophytum meandriforme Tixier-Durivault, 1956
- Lobophytum michaelae Tixier-Durivault, 1956
- Lobophytum microlobulatum Tixier-Durivault, 1970
- Lobophytum microspiculatum Tixier-Durivault, 1956
- Lobophytum mirabile Tixier-Durivault, 1956
- Lobophytum mortoni Benayahu & van Ofwegen, 2009
- Lobophytum oligoverrucum Li, 1984
- Lobophytum patulum Tixier-Durivault, 1956
- Lobophytum pauciflorum (Ehrenberg, 1834)
- Lobophytum planum Tixier-Durivault, 1970
- Lobophytum proprium (Tixier-Durivault, 1970)
- Lobophytum prostratum Verseveldt & Benayahu, 1983
- Lobophytum pusillum Tixier-Durivault, 1970
- Lobophytum pygmapedium Li, 1984
- Lobophytum ransoni Tixier-Durivault, 1957
- Lobophytum rigidum Benayahu, 1995
- Lobophytum rotundum Tixier-Durivault, 1957
- Lobophytum salvati Tixier-Durivault, 1970
- Lobophytum sarcophytoides Moser, 1919
- Lobophytum schoedei Moser, 1919
- Lobophytum solidum Tixier-Durivault, 1970
- Lobophytum spicodigitum Li, 1984
- Lobophytum strictum Tixier-Durivault, 1957
- Lobophytum tecticum Alderslade & Shirwaiker, 1991
- Lobophytum variatum Tixier-Durivault, 1957
- Lobophytum varium Tixier-Durivault, 1970
- Lobophytum venustum Tixier-durivault, 1957
- Lobophytum verrucosum Li, 1984
- Lobophytum verum Tixier-Durivault, 1970
