= Lobophytum crassodigitum =

Scientific classification
- Kingdom: Animalia
- Phylum: Cnidaria
- Subphylum: Anthozoa
- Class: Octocorallia
- Order: Malacalcyonacea
- Family: Sarcophytidae
- Genus: Lobophytum
- Species: L. crassodigitum

Binomial name
- Lobophytum crassodigitum (C.Li, 1984)

Species of soft coral

Lobophytum crassodigitum is a species of the genus Lobophytum.
