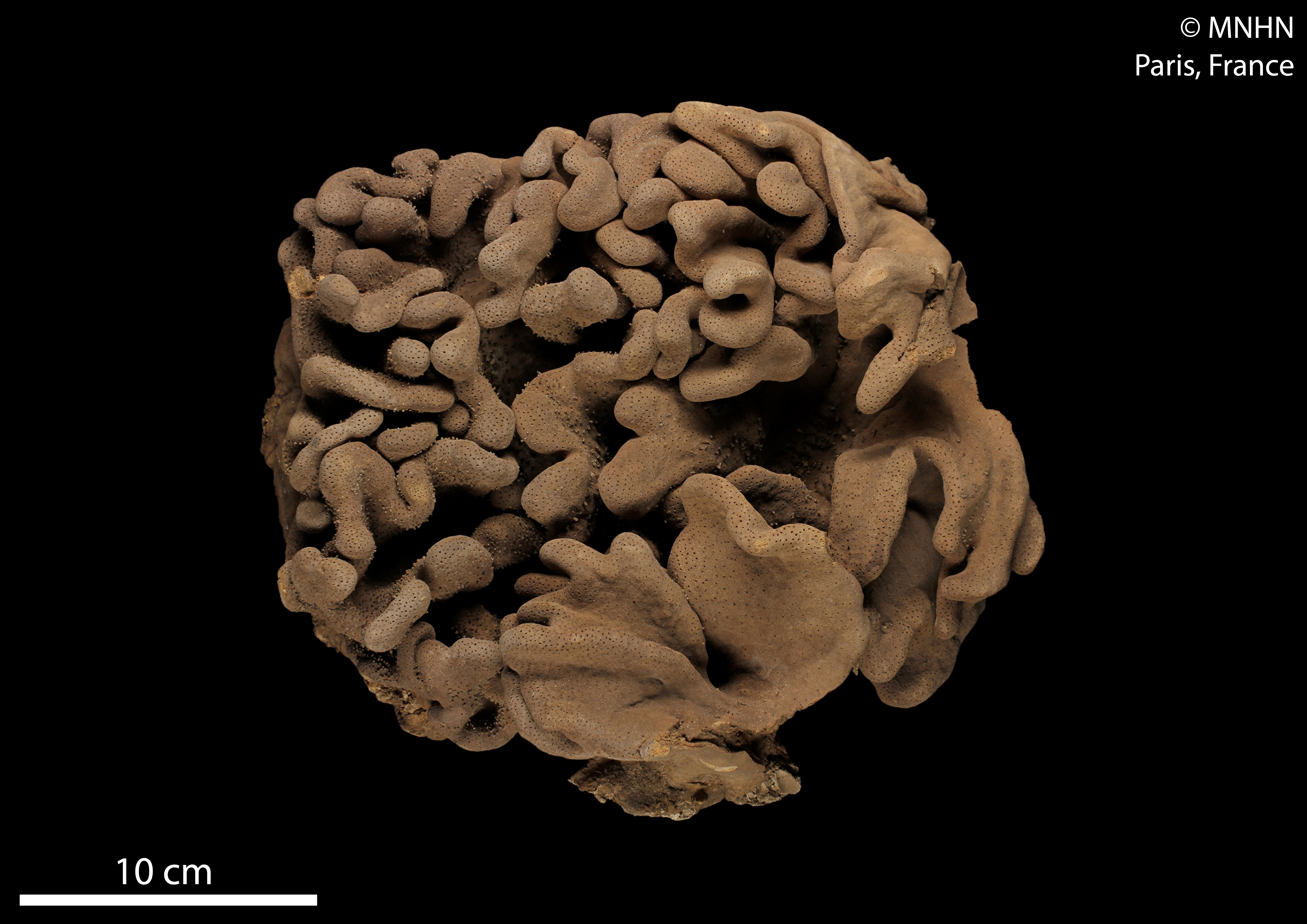
- Holotype of Lobophytum ransoni at the Museum national d'Histoire naturelle

Scientific classification
- Kingdom: Animalia
- Phylum: Cnidaria
- Subphylum: Anthozoa
- Class: Octocorallia
- Order: Malacalcyonacea
- Family: Sarcophytidae
- Genus: Lobophytum
- Species: L. ransoni

Binomial name
- Lobophytum ransoni Tixier-Durivault, 1957

= Lobophytum ransoni =

Species of soft coral

Lobophytum ransoni is a species of soft coral in the family Alcyoniidae. It occurs in the Pacific Ocean (Vietnam, Papua New Guinea).

Individual polyps measure 3–8 cm (1.2–3.1 in).
