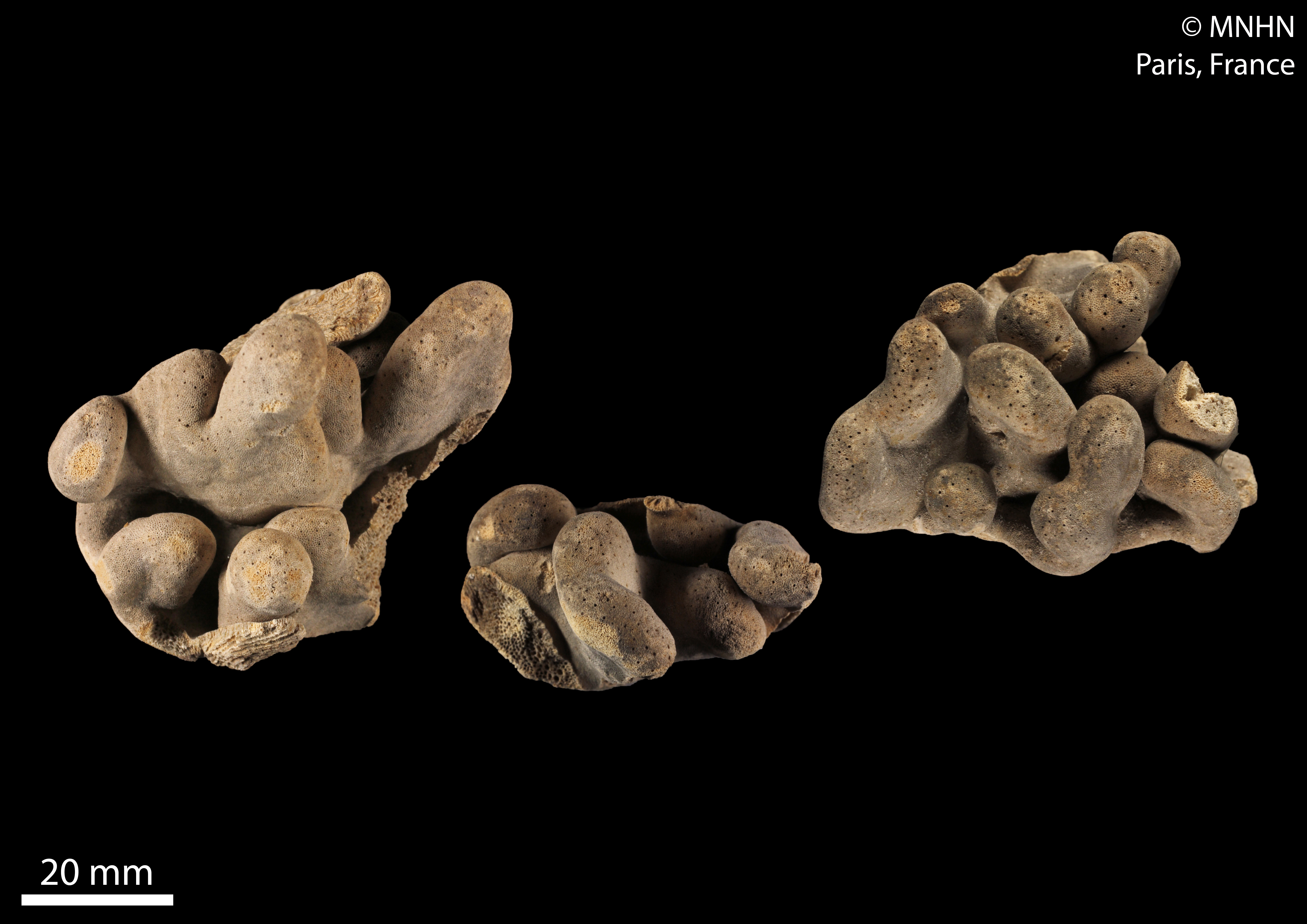
- L.catalai at Muséum national d'histoire naturelle, France

Scientific classification
- Kingdom: Animalia
- Phylum: Cnidaria
- Subphylum: Anthozoa
- Class: Octocorallia
- Order: Malacalcyonacea
- Family: Sarcophytidae
- Genus: Lobophytum
- Species: L. catalai

Binomial name
- Lobophytum catalai Tixier-Durivault, 1957

= Lobophytum catalai =

Species of soft coral

Lobophytum catalai is a species of the genus Lobophytum.
