= Lobophytum verum =

Scientific classification
- Kingdom: Animalia
- Phylum: Cnidaria
- Subphylum: Anthozoa
- Class: Octocorallia
- Order: Malacalcyonacea
- Family: Sarcophytidae
- Genus: Lobophytum
- Species: L. verum

Binomial name
- Lobophytum verum Tixier-Durivault, 1970

Species of soft coral

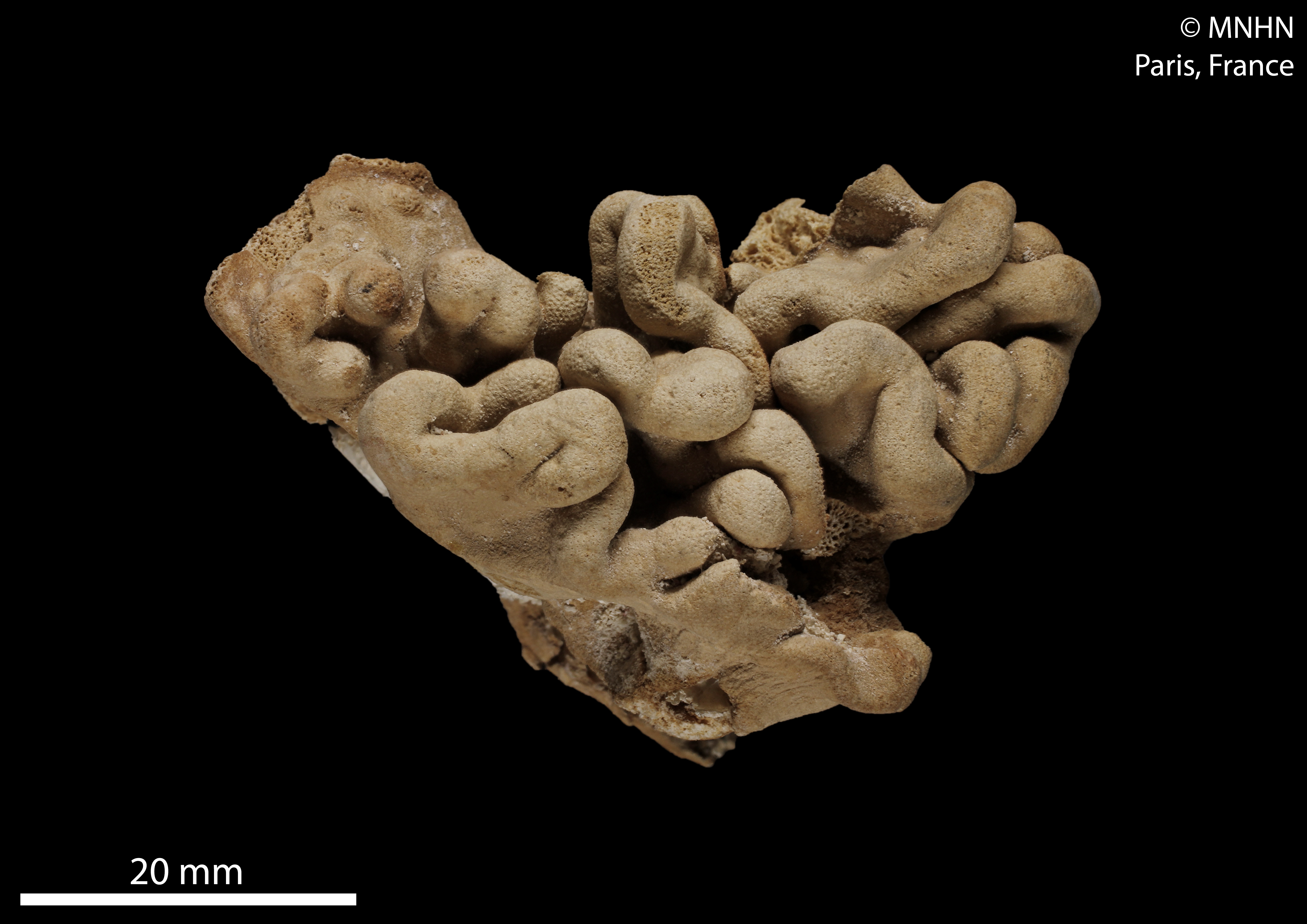
Lobophytum verum

Lobophytum verum is a species soft coral of the genus Lobophytum.
