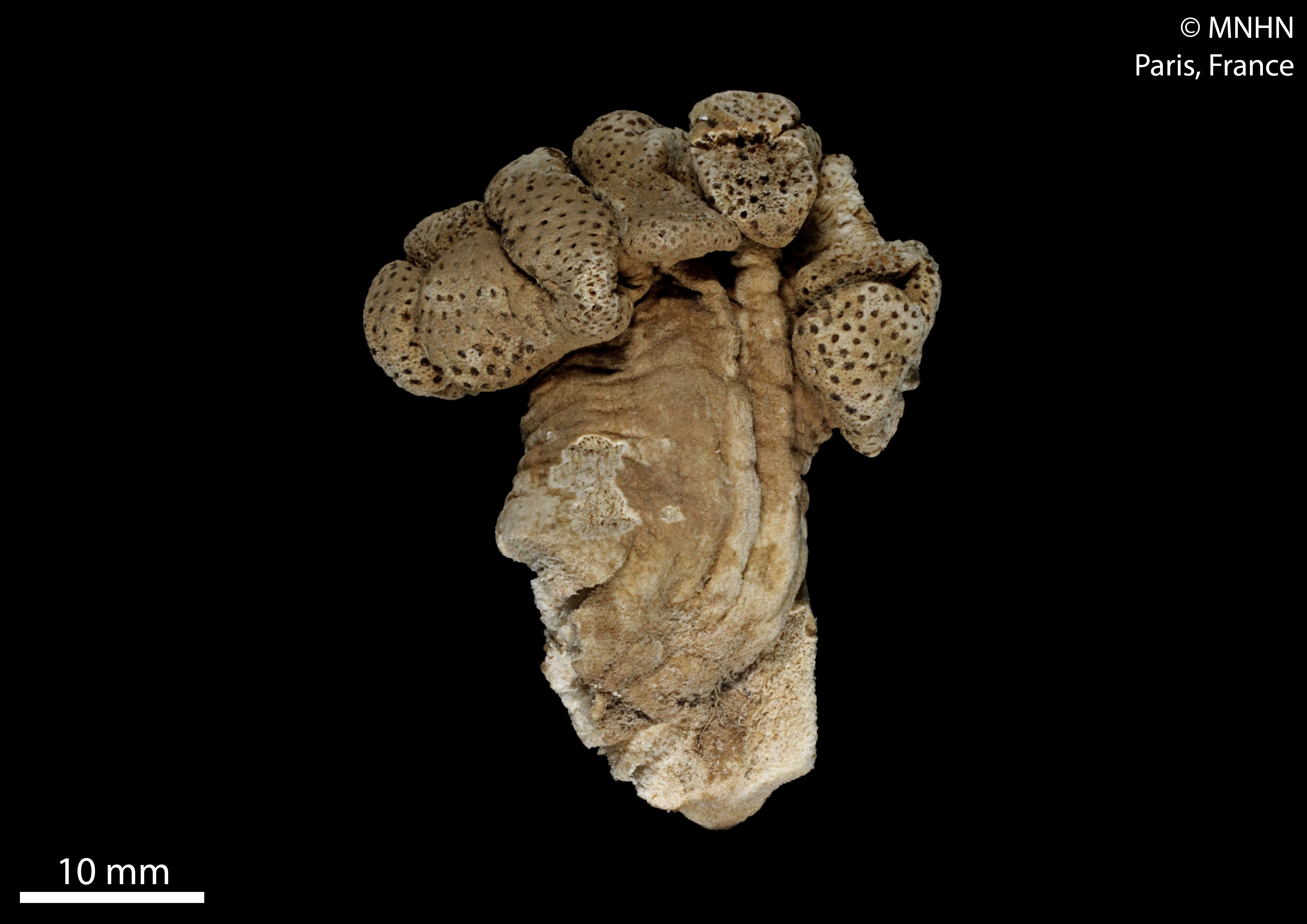
- From the National Museum of Natural History (France)

Scientific classification
- Kingdom: Animalia
- Phylum: Cnidaria
- Subphylum: Anthozoa
- Class: Octocorallia
- Order: Malacalcyonacea
- Family: Sarcophytidae
- Genus: Lobophytum
- Species: L. proprium

Binomial name
- Lobophytum proprium Tixier-Durivault, 1970

= Lobophytum proprium =

Species of soft coral

Lobophytum proprium is a species of soft coral in the family Alcyoniidae and the genus Lobophytum. It is found on Vanuatu.
