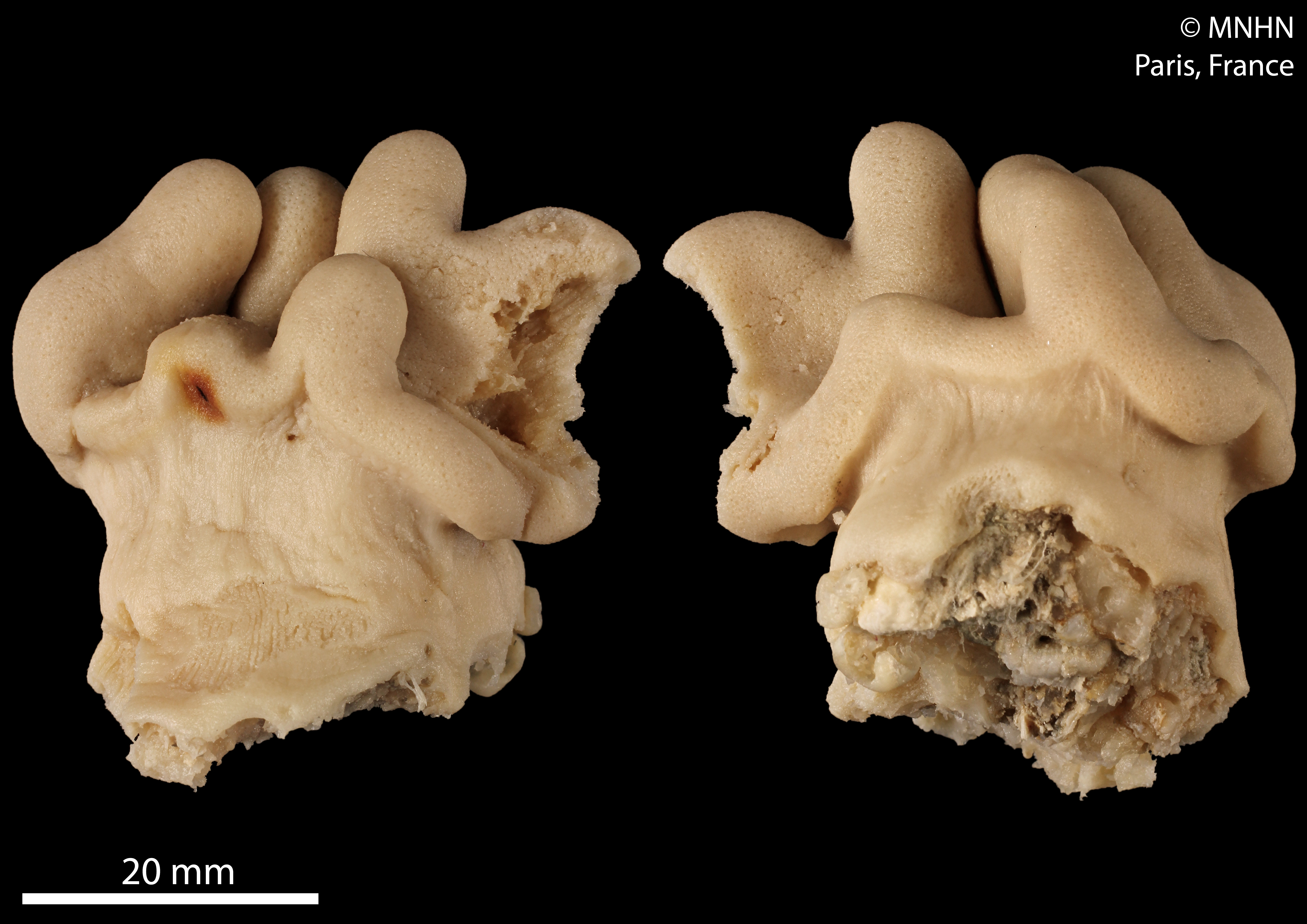

Scientific classification
- Kingdom: Animalia
- Phylum: Cnidaria
- Subphylum: Anthozoa
- Class: Octocorallia
- Order: Malacalcyonacea
- Family: Sarcophytidae
- Genus: Lobophytum
- Species: L. ignotum

Binomial name
- Lobophytum ignotum Tixier-Durivault, 1956

= Lobophytum ignotum =

Species of soft coral

Lobophytum ignotum is a species of soft coral in the family Alcyoniidae.
