= Lobophytum jasparsi =

Scientific classification
- Kingdom: Animalia
- Phylum: Cnidaria
- Subphylum: Anthozoa
- Class: Octocorallia
- Order: Malacalcyonacea
- Family: Sarcophytidae
- Genus: Lobophytum
- Species: L. jasparsi

Binomial name
- Lobophytum jasparsi van Ofwegen, 1999

Species of soft coral

Lobophytum jasparsi is a species of soft coral in the family Alcyoniidae.
