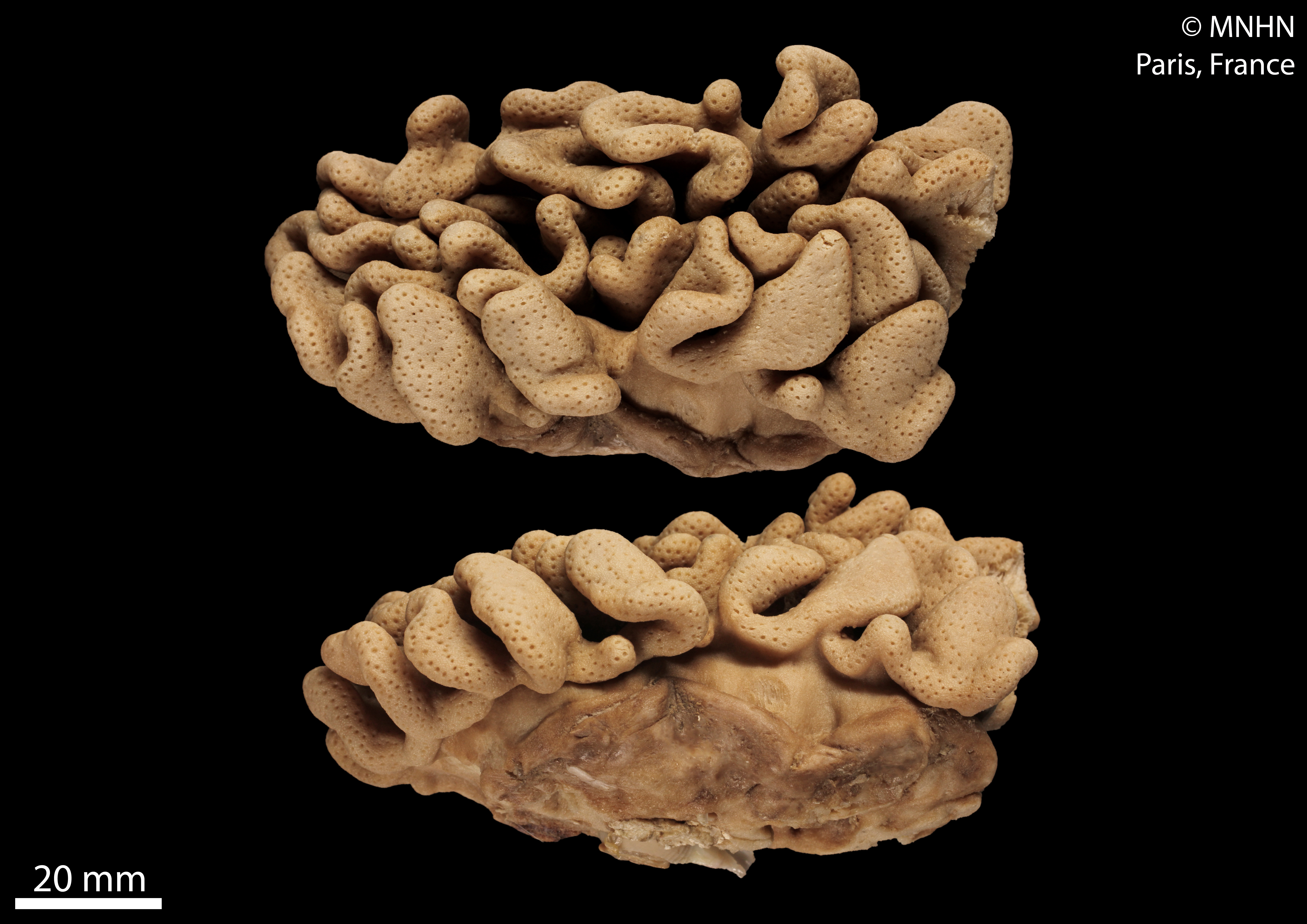
- Lobophytum crebriplicatum

Scientific classification
- Kingdom: Animalia
- Phylum: Cnidaria
- Subphylum: Anthozoa
- Class: Octocorallia
- Order: Malacalcyonacea
- Family: Sarcophytidae
- Genus: Lobophytum
- Species: L. crebliplicatum

Binomial name
- Lobophytum crebliplicatum von Marenzeller, 1886

= Lobophytum crebliplicatum =

Species of soft coral

Lobophytum crebliplicatum is a coral species of the genus Lobophytum.
