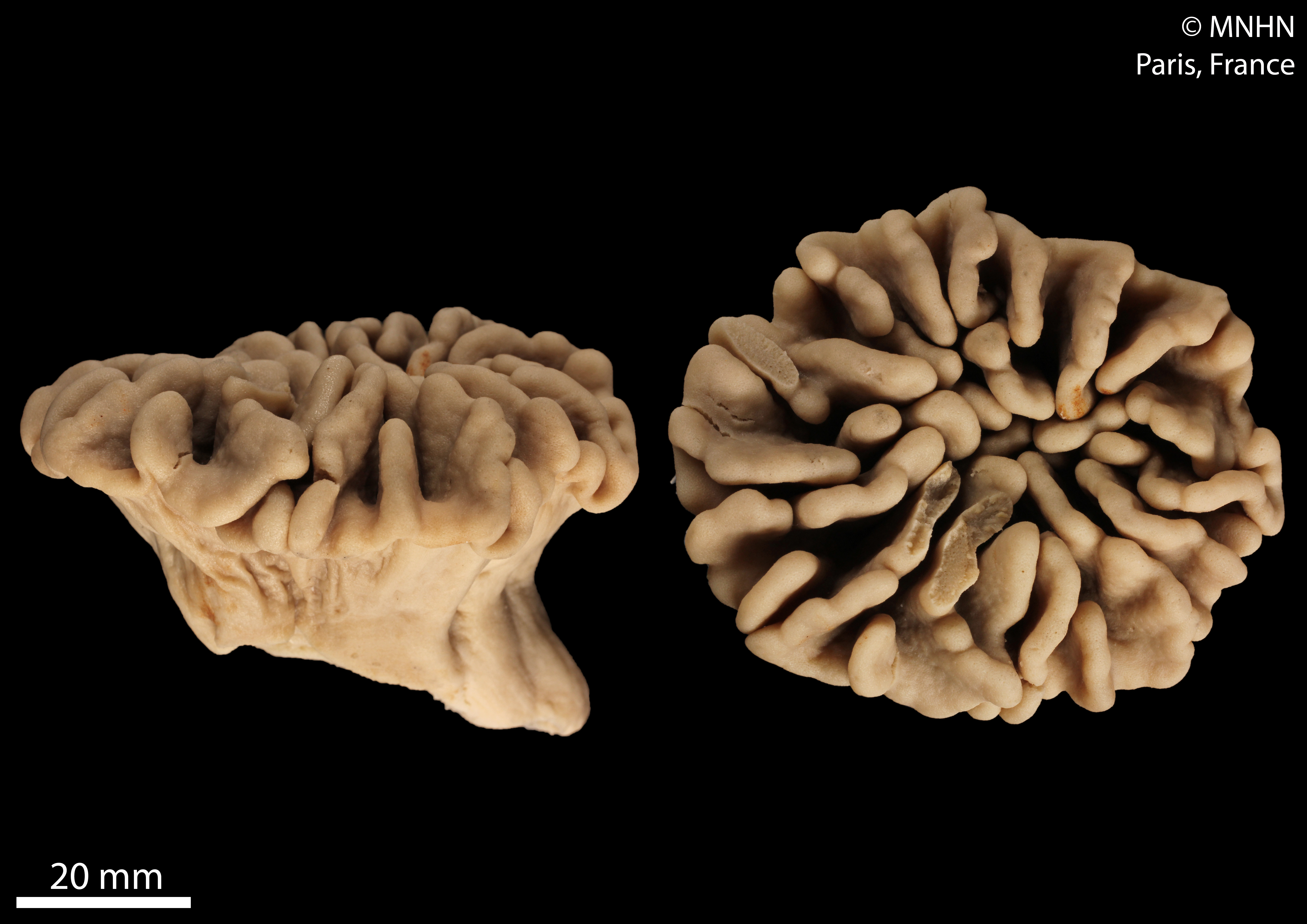

Scientific classification
- Kingdom: Animalia
- Phylum: Cnidaria
- Subphylum: Anthozoa
- Class: Octocorallia
- Order: Malacalcyonacea
- Family: Sarcophytidae
- Genus: Lobophytum
- Species: L. rotundum

Binomial name
- Lobophytum rotundum Tixier-Durivault, 1957

= Lobophytum rotundum =

Species of soft coral

Lobophytum rotundum is a species of the genus Lobophytum.
