= Lobophytum cristagalli =

Scientific classification
- Kingdom: Animalia
- Phylum: Cnidaria
- Subphylum: Anthozoa
- Class: Octocorallia
- Order: Malacalcyonacea
- Family: Sarcophytidae
- Genus: Lobophytum
- Species: L. cristagalli

Binomial name
- Lobophytum cristagalli von Marenzeller, 1886

Species of soft coral

Lobophytum cristagalli is a coral species of the genus Lobophytum.
