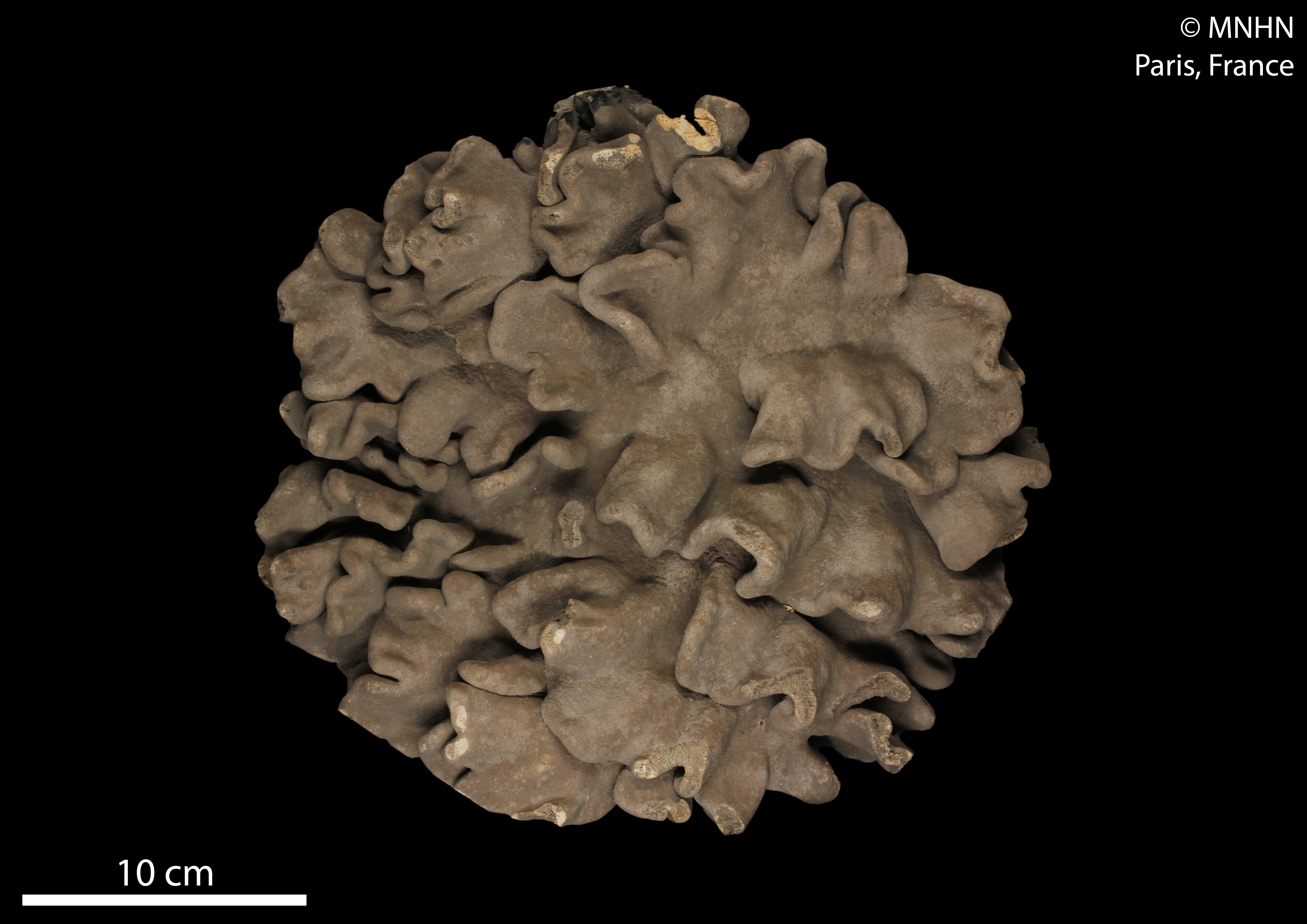

Scientific classification
- Kingdom: Animalia
- Phylum: Cnidaria
- Subphylum: Anthozoa
- Class: Octocorallia
- Order: Malacalcyonacea
- Family: Sarcophytidae
- Genus: Lobophytum
- Species: L. lamarcki

Binomial name
- Lobophytum lamarcki Tixier-Durivault, 1956

= Lobophytum lamarcki =

Species of soft coral

Lobophytum lamarcki is a species of soft coral in the family Alcyoniidae.
