= Lobophytum rigidum =

Scientific classification
- Kingdom: Animalia
- Phylum: Cnidaria
- Subphylum: Anthozoa
- Class: Octocorallia
- Order: Malacalcyonacea
- Family: Sarcophytidae
- Genus: Lobophytum
- Species: L. rigidum

Binomial name
- Lobophytum rigidum Benayahu, 1995

Species of soft coral

Lobophytum rigidum is a species of the genus Lobophytum.
