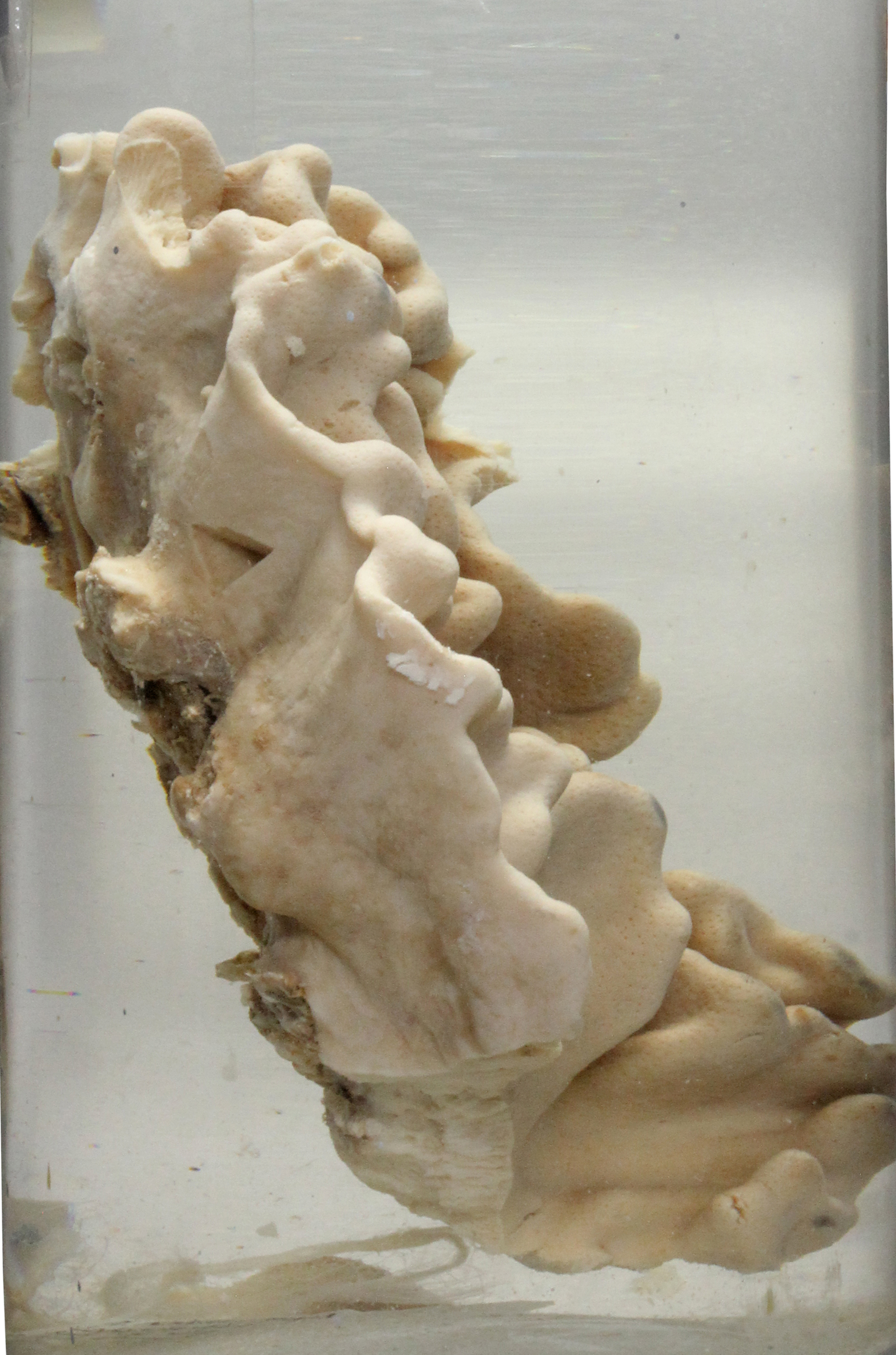

Scientific classification
- Kingdom: Animalia
- Phylum: Cnidaria
- Subphylum: Anthozoa
- Class: Octocorallia
- Order: Malacalcyonacea
- Family: Sarcophytidae
- Genus: Lobophytum
- Species: L. durum

Binomial name
- Lobophytum durum Tixier-Durivault, 1956

= Lobophytum durum =

Species of soft coral

Lobophytum durum is a coral species of the genus Lobophytum.
