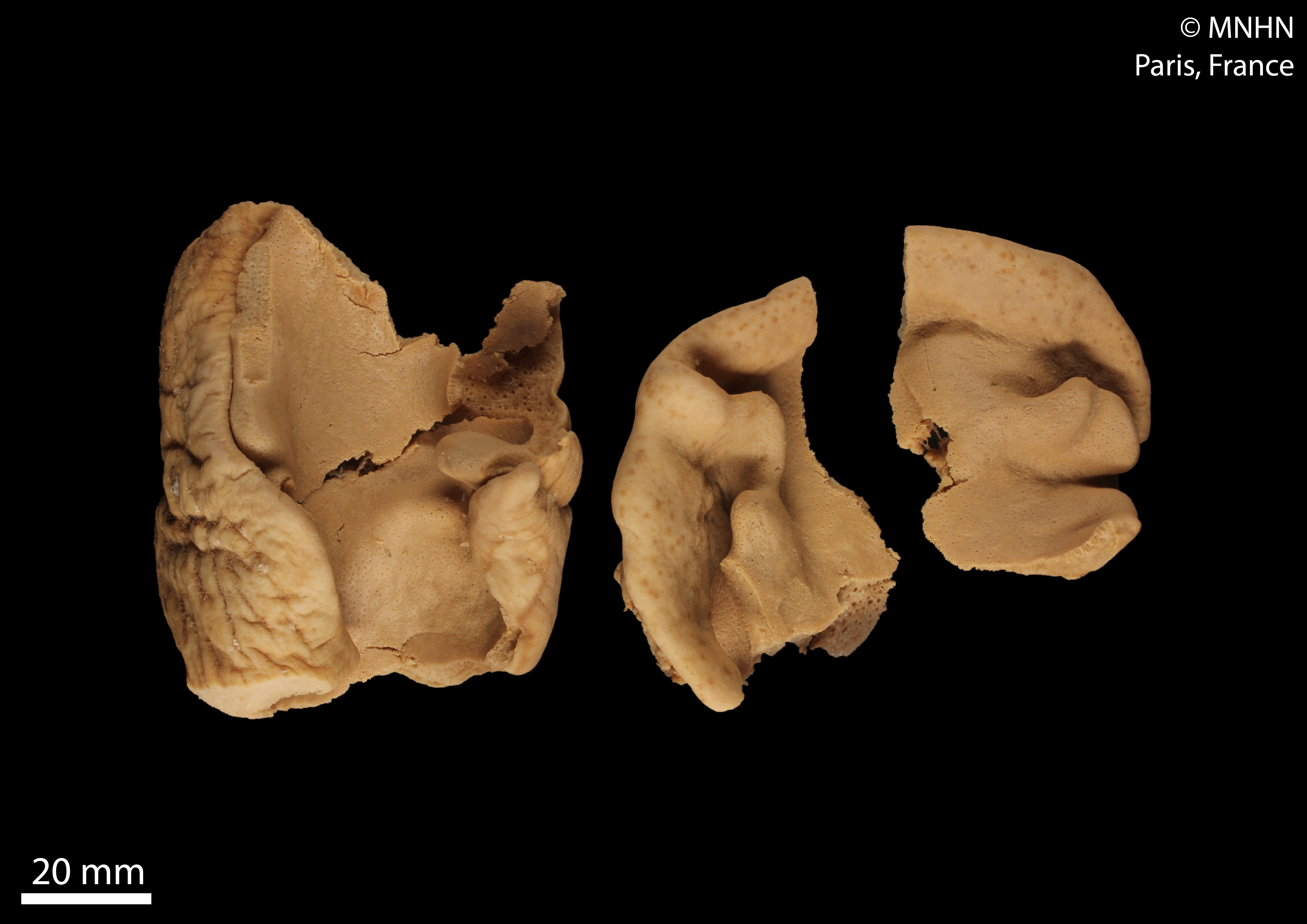

Scientific classification
- Kingdom: Animalia
- Phylum: Cnidaria
- Subphylum: Anthozoa
- Class: Octocorallia
- Order: Malacalcyonacea
- Family: Sarcophytidae
- Genus: Lobophytum
- Species: L. variatum

Binomial name
- Lobophytum variatum Tixier-Durivault, 1957

= Lobophytum variatum =

Species of soft coral

Lobophytum variatum is a species of soft coral in the genus Lobophytum.
