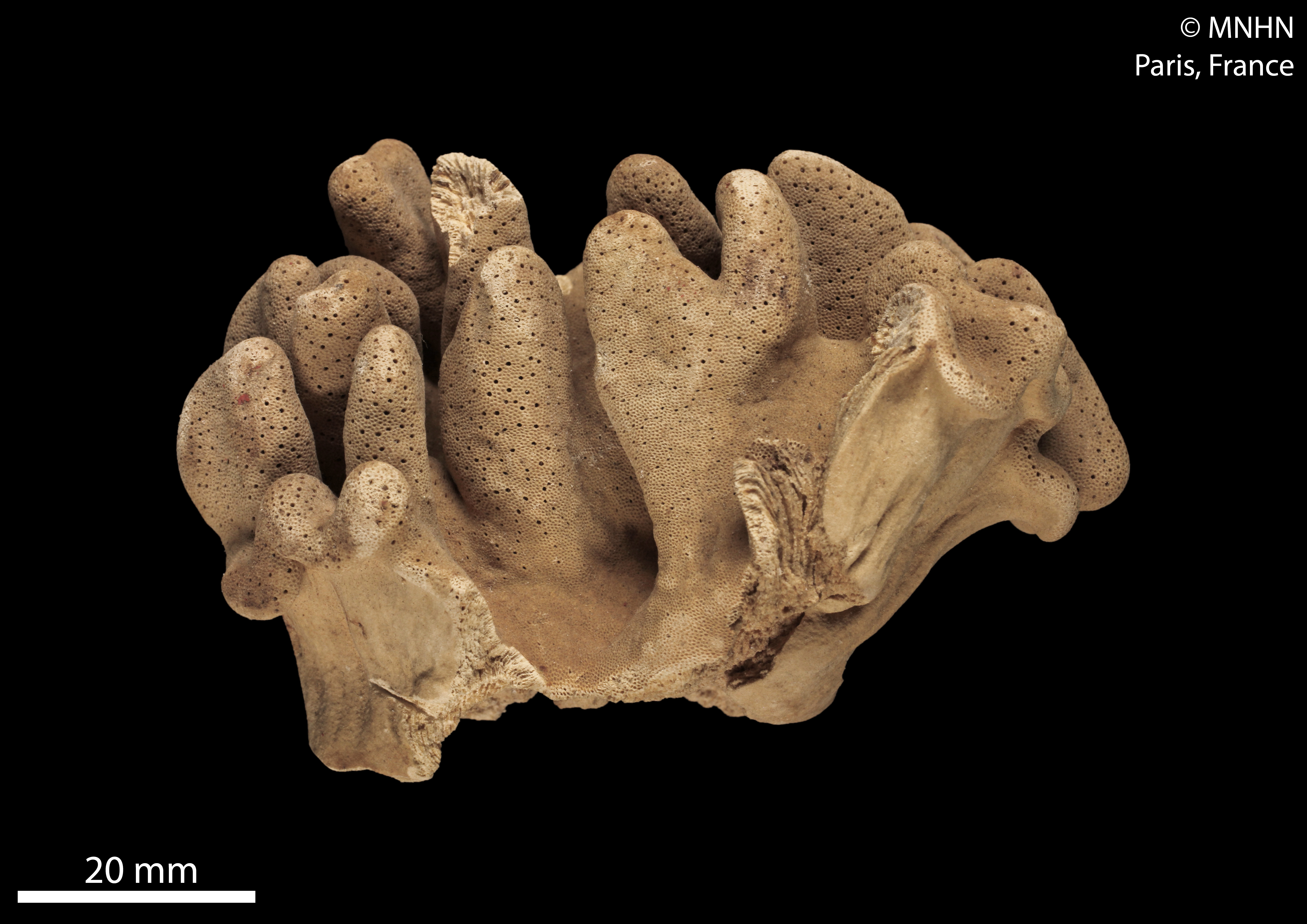

Scientific classification
- Kingdom: Animalia
- Phylum: Cnidaria
- Subphylum: Anthozoa
- Class: Octocorallia
- Order: Malacalcyonacea
- Family: Sarcophytidae
- Genus: Lobophytum
- Species: L. solidum

Binomial name
- Lobophytum solidum Tixier-Durivault, 1970

= Lobophytum solidum =

Species of soft coral

Lobophytum solidum is a species of soft coral in the genus Lobophytum.
