= Lobophytum anomolum =

Scientific classification
- Kingdom: Animalia
- Phylum: Cnidaria
- Subphylum: Anthozoa
- Class: Octocorallia
- Order: Malacalcyonacea
- Family: Sarcophytidae
- Genus: Lobophytum
- Species: L. anomolum

Binomial name
- Lobophytum anomolum Li, 1984

Species of coral

Lobophytum anomolum is a species of soft coral in the genus Lobophytum.
