= Lobophytum batarum =

Scientific classification
- Kingdom: Animalia
- Phylum: Cnidaria
- Subphylum: Anthozoa
- Class: Octocorallia
- Order: Malacalcyonacea
- Family: Sarcophytidae
- Genus: Lobophytum
- Species: L. batarum

Binomial name
- Lobophytum batarum Moser, 1919

Species of coral

Lobophytum batarum is a species of Devil's Hand Coral or Lobophytum found in the Pacific and Indian oceans.
