= Lobophytum oligoverrucum =

Scientific classification
- Kingdom: Animalia
- Phylum: Cnidaria
- Subphylum: Anthozoa
- Class: Octocorallia
- Order: Malacalcyonacea
- Family: Sarcophytidae
- Genus: Lobophytum
- Species: L. oligoverrucum

Binomial name
- Lobophytum oligoverrucum (C.Li, 1984)

Species of soft coral

Lobophytum oligoverrucum is a species of soft coral in the family Alcyoniidae and the genus Lobophytum.
