= Qaleh-ye Salvati =

Qaleh-ye Salvati قلعه صلواتي
- Village
- Country: Iran
- Province: Khuzestan
- County: Lali
- Bakhsh: Hati
- Rural District: Jastun Shah

Population (2006)
  - Total: 35
- Time zone: UTC+3:30 (IRST)
  - Summer (DST): UTC+4:30 (IRDT)

Qaleh-ye Salvati (Persian: قلعه صلواتي, also Romanized as Qal‘eh-ye Şalvātī) is a village in Jastun Shah Rural District, Hati District, Lali County, Khuzestan Province, Iran. At the 2006 census, its population was 35, in 6 families.
