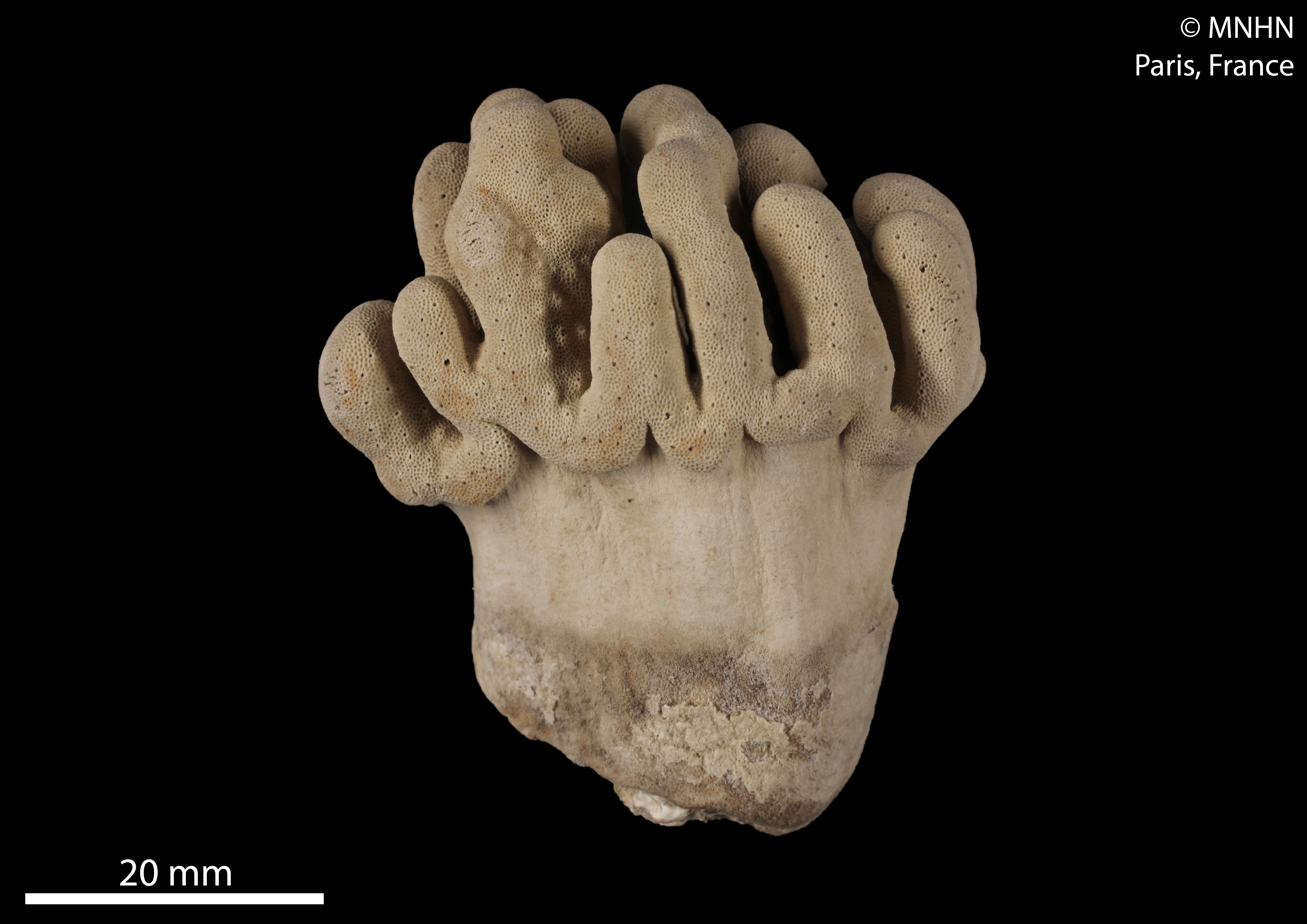
- Lobophytum salvati

Scientific classification
- Kingdom: Animalia
- Phylum: Cnidaria
- Subphylum: Anthozoa
- Class: Octocorallia
- Order: Malacalcyonacea
- Family: Sarcophytidae
- Genus: Lobophytum
- Species: L. salvati

Binomial name
- Lobophytum salvati Tixier-Durivault, 1970

= Lobophytum salvati =

Species of coral

Lobophytum salvati is a species of the genus Lobophytum.
