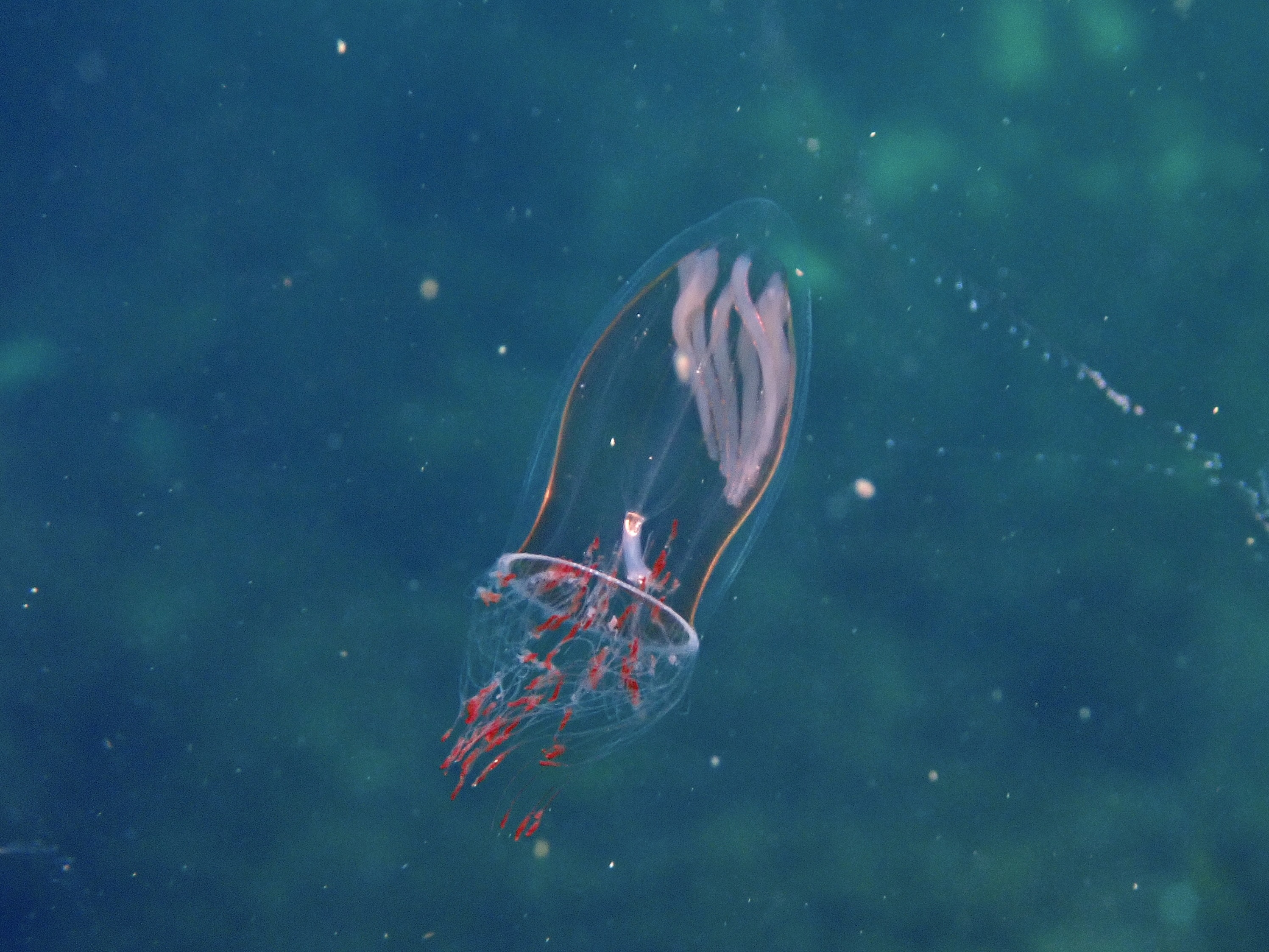

Scientific classification
- Domain: Eukaryota
- Kingdom: Animalia
- Phylum: Cnidaria
- Class: Hydrozoa
- Order: Trachymedusae
- Family: Rhopalonematidae
- Genus: Aglantha
- Species: A. digitale

Binomial name
- Aglantha digitale (O. F. Müller, 1776)

Synonyms
- Aglantha conica Hargitt, 1902; Circe camtschatica Brandt, 1835; Circe impatiens A. Agassiz, 1862; Circe rosea Forbes, 1848; Medusa digitale O. F. Müller, 1776; Trachyneme digitale (O. F. Müller, 1776); Turris borealis Lesson, 1843

= Aglantha digitale =

Species of hydrozoan

Aglantha digitale is a species of hydrozoan in the family Rhopalonematidae. It is found in the Arctic and sub-Arctic where it is one of the most common jellyfish. It is unusual in having both a slow swimming action, through pulsating its bell, and a rapid escape response.

== Description ==
Aglantha digitale is a small, transparent, hydrozoan with a maximum height of 4 cm (1.6 in). The bell is thimble-shaped, taller than it is wide, and has a small conical bulge at the apex. There are about eighty slender solid marginal tentacles on the edge of the bell. Eight club-shaped statocysts occupy the bell-margin between the eight radial canals. The gastric peduncle dangles inside the bell, and the mouth at the tip of the small manubrium has four simple lips. Mature individuals have eight white, sausage-shaped gonads which are visible through the bell. This hydrozoan is usually some shade of pink.

== Distribution and habitat ==
Aglantha digitale is the most common species of jellyfish found in surface waters in the Arctic and sub-Arctic. It occurs above the continental slope but is more common over the deep ocean, seldom occurring at a depth greater than 200 m (660 ft).

== Ecology ==
Aglantha digitale is unique among known jellyfish in having giant axons in the subumbrella (the concave inner surface of the bell) which are involved in a rapid escape response. Normally the hydrozoan swims by slowly pulsating its bell, movements produced by muscle contractions which eject water through the velar opening. However, when the animal is stimulated by manipulating the bell margin, or by squeezing or tugging a marginal tentacle, it responds very rapidly, producing up to three vigorous contractions that propel it a distance of about five body lengths. In its pelagic habitat, this hydrozoan finds itself among relatively fast moving crustaceans, fish larvae and arrow worms in a jostling diurnal vertical migration, and the escape response may help it to avoid damage to its fragile tissues. Observations from submersible craft have shown the hydrozoan behaving in this way.
