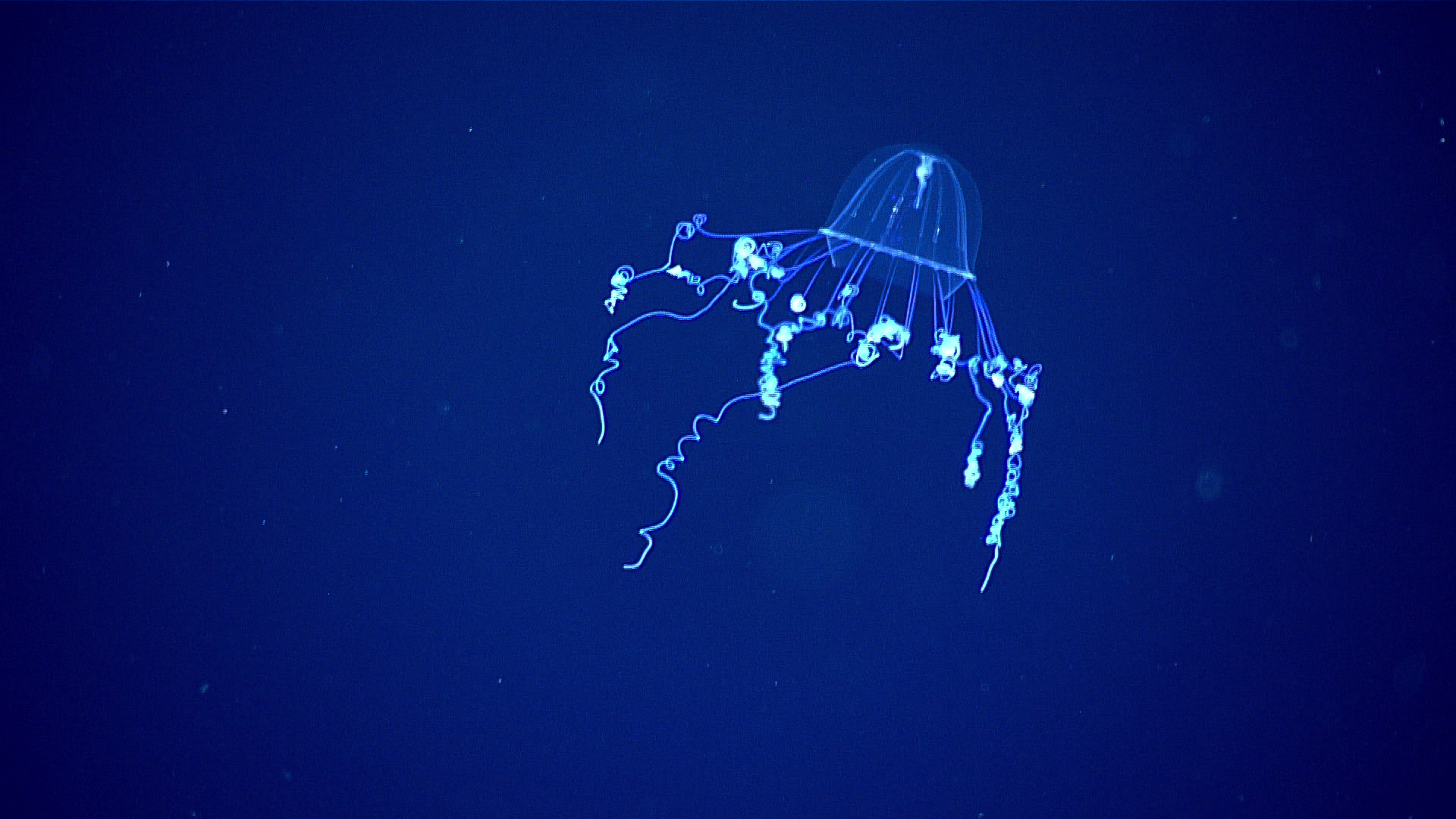

Scientific classification
- Domain: Eukaryota
- Kingdom: Animalia
- Phylum: Cnidaria
- Class: Hydrozoa
- Order: Trachymedusae
- Family: Rhopalonematidae
- Genus: Colobonema
- Species: C. sericeum

Binomial name
- Colobonema sericeum Vanhöffen, 1902

= Colobonema sericeum =

Species of hydrozoan

Colobonema sericeum is a species of deep-sea hydrozoan in the family Rhopalonematidae that was first described in 1902. This semi-transparent organism is found in the mesopelagic zone, has 32 tentacles, and has a bell diameter of up 45 mm. They are holoplanktonic and never attach to the seafloor as part of their polyp life cycle, but instead have embryos that develop directly into a small, swimming medusae.

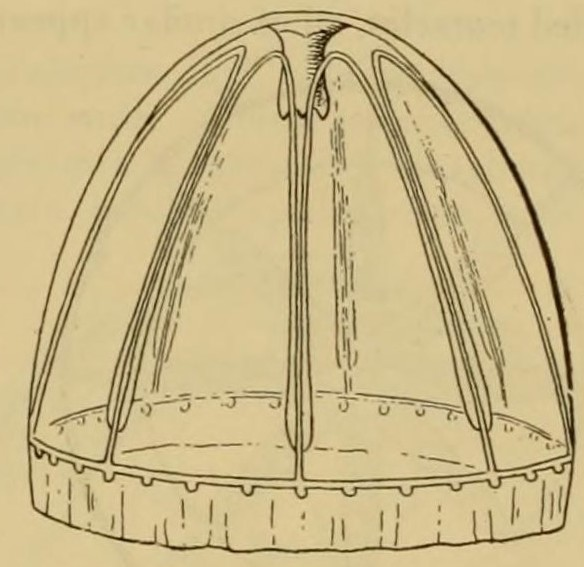
Illustration of Colobonema sericeum
