= Voragonema tatsunoko =

Scientific classification
- Domain: Eukaryota
- Kingdom: Animalia
- Phylum: Cnidaria
- Class: Hydrozoa
- Order: Trachymedusae
- Family: Rhopalonematidae
- Genus: Voragonema
- Species: V. tatsunoko

Binomial name
- Voragonema tatsunoko Lindsay & Pages, 2010

Species of hydrozoan

Voragonema tatsunoko is a species of deep sea hydrozoan.
