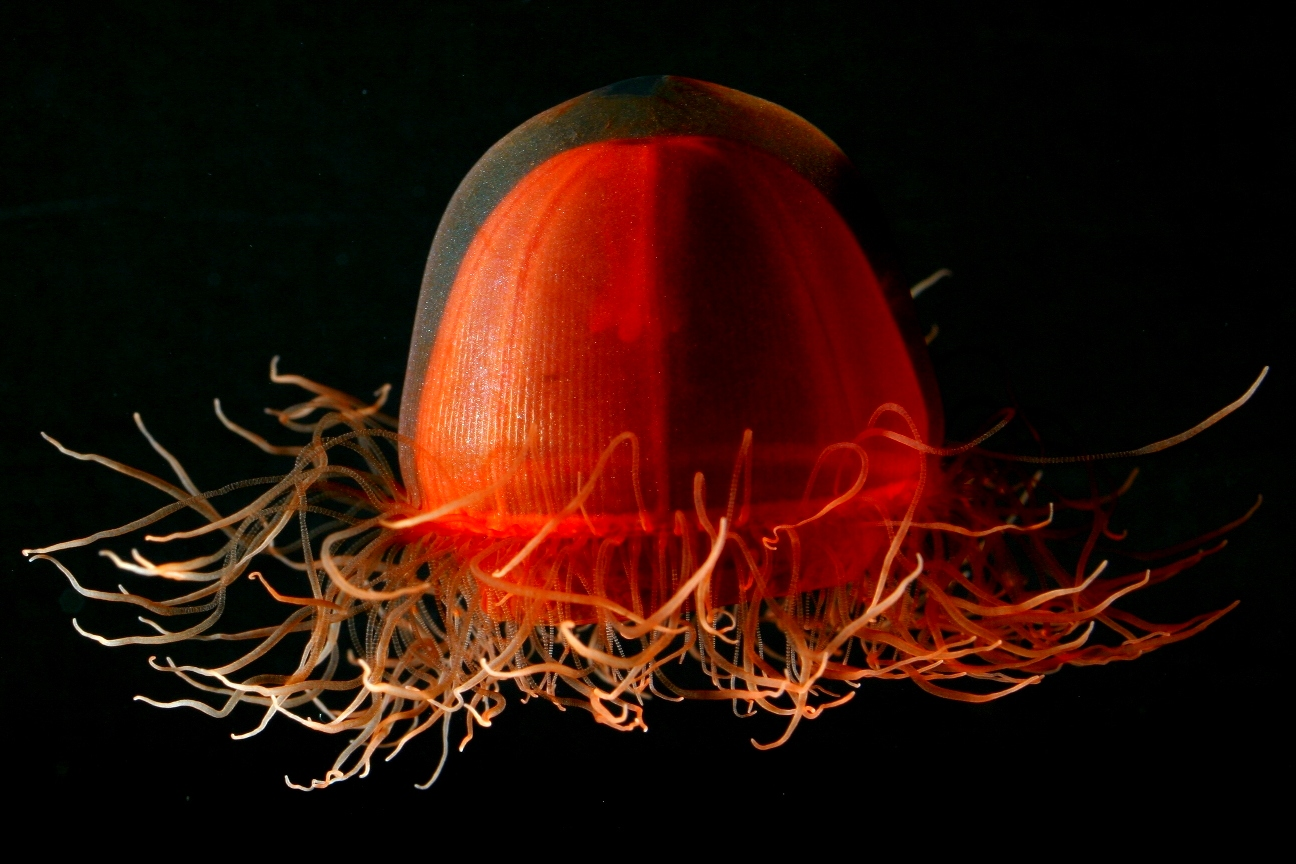

Scientific classification
- Kingdom: Animalia
- Phylum: Cnidaria
- Class: Hydrozoa
- Order: Trachymedusae
- Family: Rhopalonematidae
- Genus: Crossota
- Species: C. norvegica

Binomial name
- Crossota norvegica Vanhöffen, 1902

= Crossota norvegica =

Species of hydrozoan

Crossota norvegica is a species of hydrozoan in the family Rhopalonematidae. It is closely related to Crossota millsae and is found in the Arctic Ocean at depths below 1,000 m (3,300 ft). Crossota norvegica is also known as the deep red jellyfish. This species is described as "alien-like" and is known for its vibrant red hue. It is a small cnidarian, reaching only up to 2 cm in its body size.

== Description ==
Unlike other cnidarians, Crossota norvegica lives its entire life in the planktonic stage or the planula stage, instead of experiencing both the sessile stage and planula stage. Another unique trait off this species is that it does not develop into a polyp. Polyps typically produce the sexual reproduction gametes of cnidarians by budding. These polyps are stationary and non-moving forms of cnidarians (The Columbia Encyclopedia). Others will reproduce sexually in the medusa stage, where they are free-swimming cnidarians. During this stage they are typically very small, around 1-50mm in diameter. It is unclear whether or not this species is dioecious, meaning that it needs both a male and a female in order to reproduce. Alternatively, some hydrozoa, but not all, can be sequential hermaphrodites where they can produce and fertilize eggs on their own, without a partner. Crossota norvegica is closely related to the Crossota millsae, in which both males and females have been found and described to reproduce together. As a part of the cnidarian family, they have ectodermal cells that contain nematocysts (cnidae). Some of these nematocysts have the ability to sting. Along the cnidae are spines that will produce an acid. When the cnidae comes into contact, the nematocysts get stuck into prey. Though these are a very common type of cnidae, not all cnidae have the ability to produce acid to stun prey.

== Habitat and diet ==
Crossota norvegica lives in temperatures ranging from 3.7˚C to 3.9˚C. This species has been found in waters deeper than 2,500 m. Its diet is currently unknown. Many Hydrozoa will feed on small zooplankton by use of their tentacles, whereas others eat phytoplankton.

== Philatelic error ==
Crossota norvegica appeared on a stamp issued by Canada in 2007 to commemorate the International Polar Year. Unfortunately, the name on the stamp was given as Crossota millsaeare, a misspelling of Crossota millsae.
