= Crossota alba =

Scientific classification
- Kingdom: Animalia
- Phylum: Cnidaria
- Class: Hydrozoa
- Order: Trachymedusae
- Family: Rhopalonematidae
- Genus: Crossota
- Species: C. alba

Binomial name
- Crossota alba Bigelow, 1913

Species of hydrozoan

Crossota alba is a species of hydrozoan in the family Rhopalonematidae. This species does not have sessile stage as other hydromedusae. Crossota is spread all over the ocean and lives their life in water as plankton. Crossota alba are commonly distributed in the west coast waters of India.
