= Voragonema pedunculata =

Scientific classification
- Domain: Eukaryota
- Kingdom: Animalia
- Phylum: Cnidaria
- Class: Hydrozoa
- Order: Trachymedusae
- Family: Rhopalonematidae
- Genus: Voragonema
- Species: V. pedunculata

Binomial name
- Voragonema pedunculata (Bigelow, 1913)

Species of cnidarian

Voragonema pedunculata is a small red hydrozoan with a diameter reaching 4 cm. It has 1000-2000 fine tentacles. It is found in the Pacific Ocean with known distributions in Monterey Bay, California, United States and the San Clemente Basin.
