= Crossota rufobrunnea =

Scientific classification
- Domain: Eukaryota
- Kingdom: Animalia
- Phylum: Cnidaria
- Class: Hydrozoa
- Order: Trachymedusae
- Family: Rhopalonematidae
- Genus: Crossota
- Species: C. rufobrunnea

Binomial name
- Crossota rufobrunnea (Kramp, 1913)

Species of hydrozoan

Crossota rufobrunnea is a species of hydrozoan.
