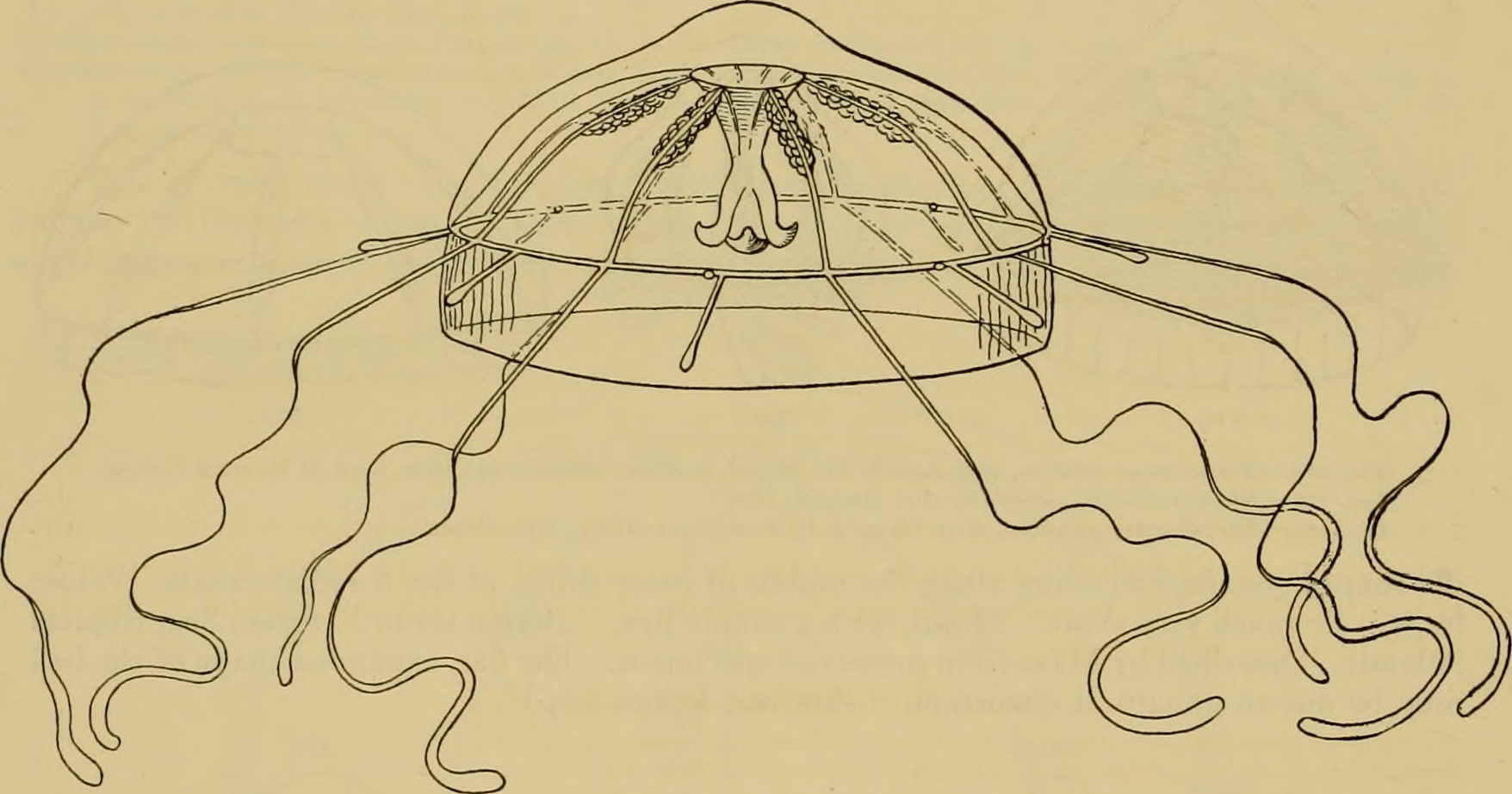

Scientific classification
- Domain: Eukaryota
- Kingdom: Animalia
- Phylum: Cnidaria
- Class: Hydrozoa
- Order: Trachymedusae
- Family: Rhopalonematidae
- Genus: Sminthea; Gegenbaur, 1857

= Sminthea =

Genus of hydrozoans

Sminthea is a genus of deep-sea hydrozoans of the family of Rhopalonematidae,

== Species ==
- Sminthea apicigastrica Xu, Huang & Du, 2009
- Sminthea eurygaster Gegenbaur, 1857
