= Crossota millsae =

Scientific classification
- Kingdom: Animalia
- Phylum: Cnidaria
- Class: Hydrozoa
- Order: Trachymedusae
- Family: Rhopalonematidae
- Genus: Crossota
- Species: C. millsae

Binomial name
- Crossota millsae Thuesen, 2003

Synonyms
- Crossota millsaeare (lapsus)

Species of cnidarian

Crossota millsae is a species of deep-sea hydrozoan. These small ocean-dwelling creatures are bioluminescent; the light emitted by these jellyfish serves as a defense or warning to other creatures. Males and females have both been described, and it reproduces sexually. They are viviparous and females brood baby medusae attached to the gastric canals inside the sub-umbrellar space.

== Distribution ==
Crossota millsae was first described from the Pacific Ocean off Hawaii and California. It was subsequently found in the Arctic Ocean and in Guayanilla Canyon off Puerto Rico. NOAA researchers who filmed this species in 2018 near Puerto Rico called it a "psychedelic" jellyfish. It lives below 1 km depth in all four regions. Its highest abundance is found at 2500 m off California and 1250 m off Hawaii. In the Arctic Ocean, it has been observed sitting on the seafloor.

== Etymology ==
It was named after Dr. Claudia Mills, a marine scientist at the Friday Harbor Laboratories.
