= Tetrorchis =

Scientific classification
- Domain: Eukaryota
- Kingdom: Animalia
- Phylum: Cnidaria
- Class: Hydrozoa
- Order: Trachymedusae
- Family: Rhopalonematidae
- Genus: Tetrorchis; Bigelow, 1909
- Species: T. erythrogaster

Binomial name
- Tetrorchis erythrogaster Bigelow, 1909

Genus of hydrozoans

Tetrorchis is a monotypic genus of deep-sea hydrozoan in the family Rhopalonematidae. It is represented by the species Tetrorchis erythrogaster.
