= Arctapodema =

Scientific classification
- Kingdom: Animalia
- Phylum: Cnidaria
- Class: Hydrozoa
- Order: Trachymedusae
- Family: Rhopalonematidae
- Genus: Arctapodema; Dall, 1907

Species
- see text

Synonyms
- Isonema Maas, 1906

Genus of hydrozoans

Arctapodema is a genus of deep-sea hydrozoans in the family Rhopalonematidae.

== Description ==
All Arctapodema species are characterized by a small hemispherical bell of up to 23 mm in diameter. Furthermore, they are characterized by four simple lips, no gastric peduncle, eight narrow radial canals with gonads on them that are adjacent to the manubrium, numerous alike tentacles in a single row, and free club-shaped marginal statocysts.

== Species ==
- Arctapodema ampla Vanhöffen, 1902
- Arctapodema antarctica Vanhöffen, 1912
- Arctapodema australis Vanhöffen, 1902
- Arctapodema macrogaster Vanhöffen, 1902

Besides the four accepted species of Arctapodema reported within the Southern Ocean, one more has been discussed. Arctapodema tetragonia (Vanhöffen, 1912) is an unaccepted species debated to be A. ampla due to its comparable morphology: a short stomach and four short lips, but four kidney-shaped gonads on the walls of stomach that are adjacent to the subumbrella, and about 112 tentacles.

=== Invalid species ===
- Arctapodema antarcticum (Vanhöffen, 1912) [incorrect gender suffix]
- Arctapodema australe Vanhöffen, 1912 [incorrect spelling]
