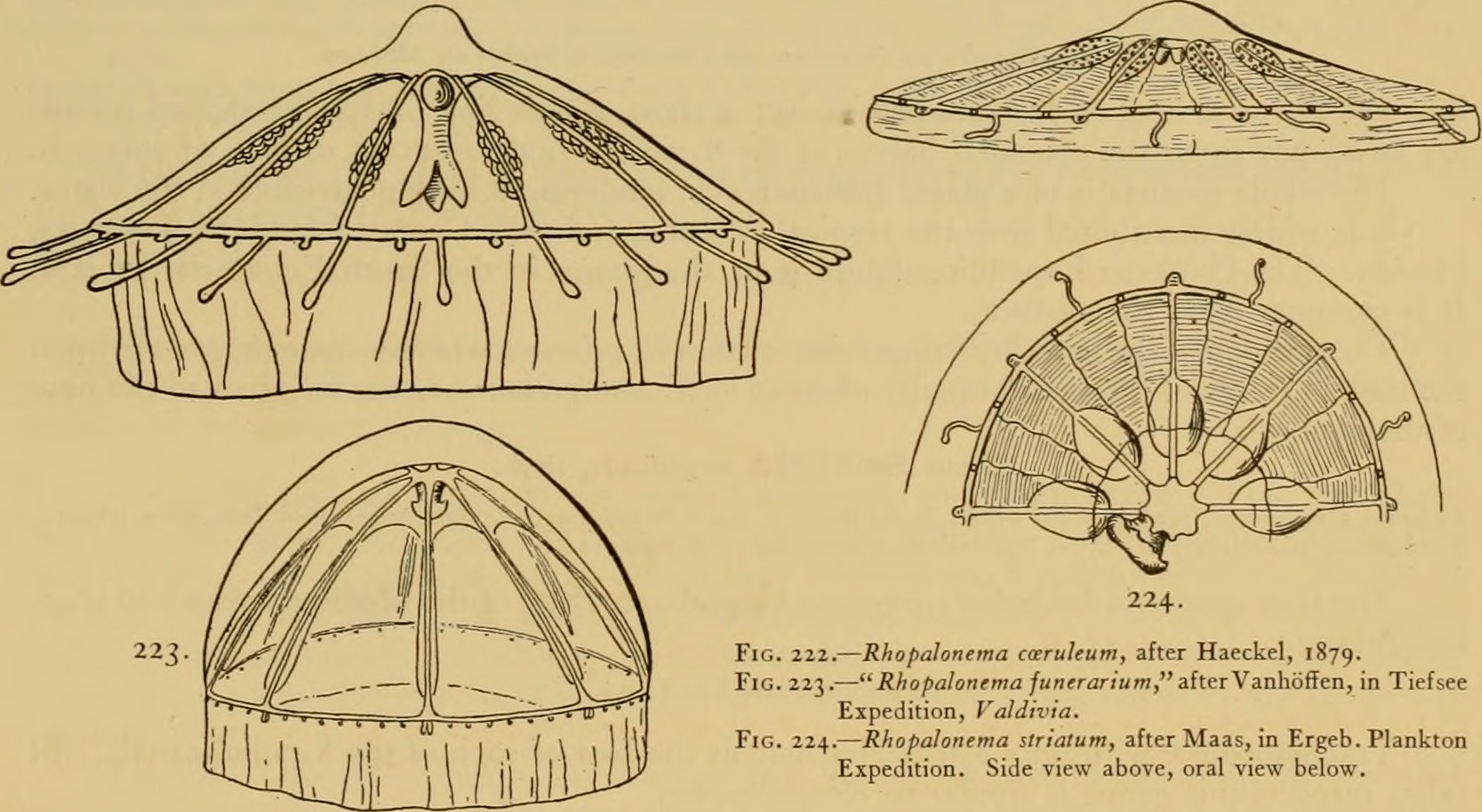

Scientific classification
- Domain: Eukaryota
- Kingdom: Animalia
- Phylum: Cnidaria
- Class: Hydrozoa
- Order: Trachymedusae
- Family: Rhopalonematidae
- Genus: Rhopalonema; Gegenbaur, 1857

Synonyms
- Calyptra Leuckart, 1856; Marmanema Haeckel, 1879; Trachynema Gegenbaur, 1854

= Rhopalonema =

Genus of hydrozoans

Rhopalonema is a genus of deep-sea hydrozoans of the family Rhopalonematidae.

== Species ==
There are two species:

- Rhopalonema funerarium Vanhöffen, 1902
- Rhopalonema velatum Gegenbaur, 1857
