= Petasiella =

Scientific classification
- Kingdom: Animalia
- Phylum: Cnidaria
- Class: Hydrozoa
- Order: Trachymedusae
- Family: Petasidae
- Genus: Petasiella; Uchida, 1947
- Species: P. asymmetrica

Binomial name
- Petasiella asymmetrica Uchida, 1947

Genus of hydrozoans

Petasiella is a monotypic genus of hydrozoans belonging to the family Petasidae. The only species is Petasiella asymmetrica.

The genus and species were first described in 1947 by the Japanese zoologist Tohru Uchida.

The species is found in Malesia.
