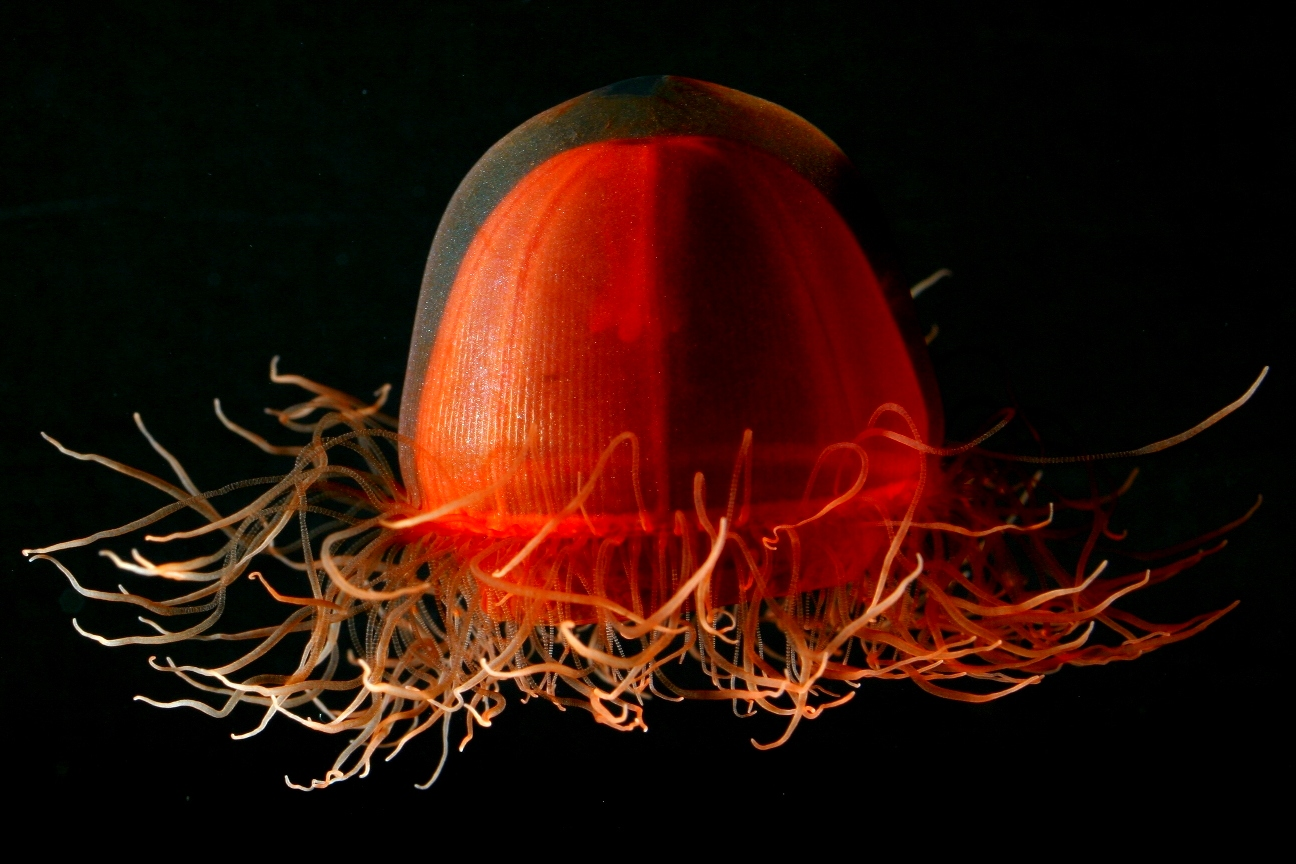
- Crossota sp.

Scientific classification
- Kingdom: Animalia
- Phylum: Cnidaria
- Class: Hydrozoa
- Subclass: Trachylinae; Haeckel, 1879

Orders
- Actinulida Swedmark & Teissier, 1958; Limnomedusae Kramp, 1938; Narcomedusae Haeckel, 1879; Trachymedusae Haeckel, 1866

Synonyms
- Automedusae; Trachylida; Trachylidae; Trachylina; Trachylinida

= Trachylinae =

Subclass of hydrozoans

Trachylinae (also Trachylina, Trachylinida, etc.) is a subclass of hydrozoans. It is placed at order rank in many older classifications, and limited to contain the Narcomedusae, Trachymedusae, the Actinulidae, then considered an independent order, and also the Limnomedusae which were traditionally placed in the paraphyletic "Hydroida". It is not entirely clear whether the Limnomedusae and the Trachymedusae as conventionally circumscribed are monophyletic

The freshwater jelly Craspedacusta sowerbyi is a well-known member of the Limnomedusae and might thus belong here.

== Development ==
Of the four orders: Narcomedusae, Trachymedusae, Actinulidae, and Limnomedusae, only Limnomedusae has any sort of polyp stage, and even then it is very tiny(less than 1mm) with no tentacles. This is uncommon for other jellyfish under the phylum cnidaria. These jellyfish also tend to have fewer cells during their embryonic and larvae stage.
