= Vampyrocrossota =

Scientific classification
- Kingdom: Animalia
- Phylum: Cnidaria
- Class: Hydrozoa
- Order: Trachymedusae
- Family: Rhopalonematidae
- Genus: Vampyrocrossota; Thuesen, 1993
- Species: V. childressi

Binomial name
- Vampyrocrossota childressi Thuesen, 1993

Genus of hydrozoans

Vampyrocrossota is a genus of hydrozoans of the family Rhopalonematidae. The genus only contains one species, Vampyrocrossota childressi. Unlike many hydromedusae, these animals do not have a sessile stage. Rather, they spend their entire lives in the water column as plankton. It is the only known species with a medusa that is truly black.

== Distribution ==
Vampyrocrossota childressi has only been found in the Pacific Ocean off California and British Columbia. This deep-sea animal lives between 600–1475 m depth.

== Etymology ==
This species was named after James J. Childress, a marine biologist at the University of California, Santa Barbara who helped discover this jellyfish.
