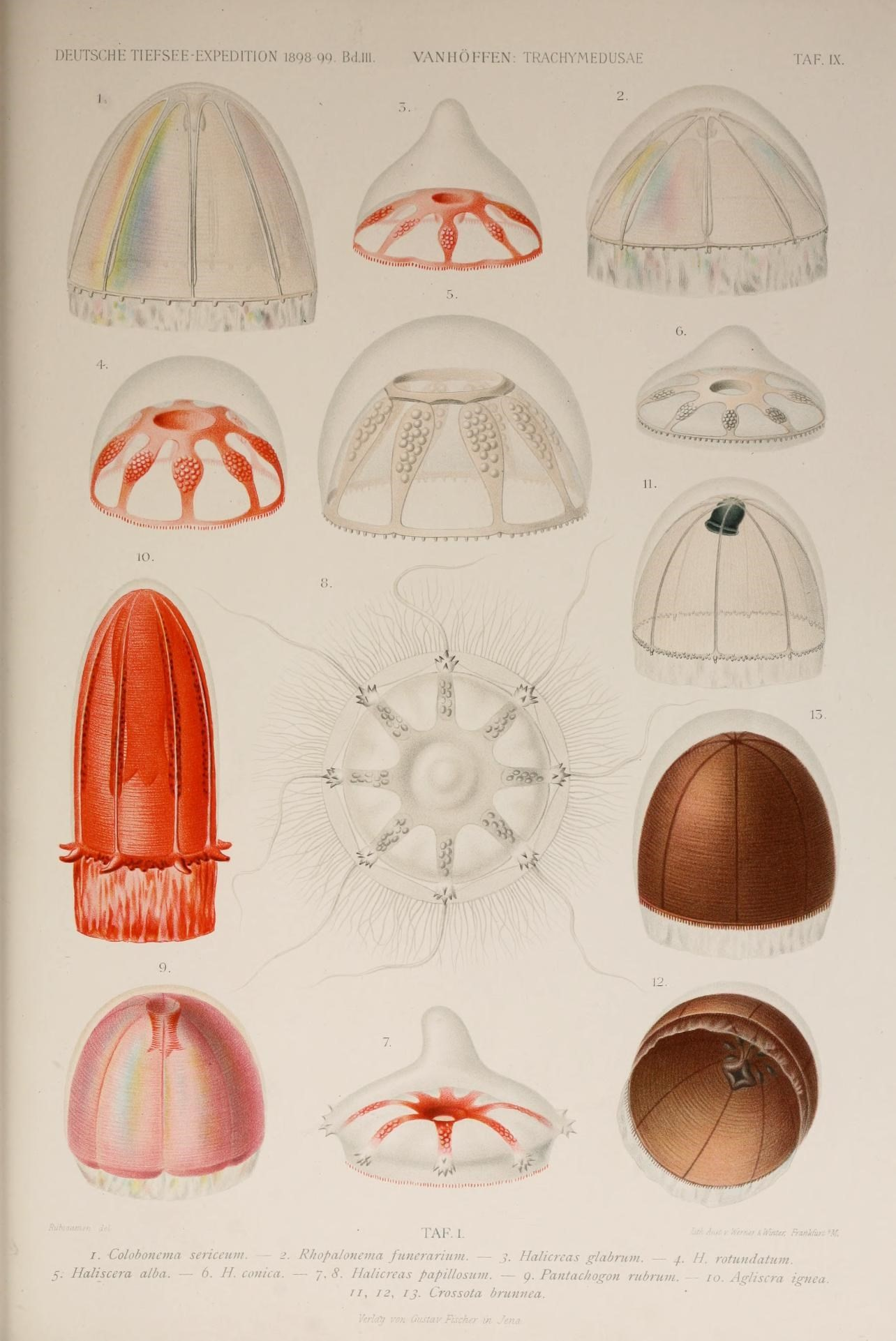
- Colobonema sericeum (top left) and Colobonema igneum (third on the left)

Scientific classification
- Kingdom: Animalia
- Phylum: Cnidaria
- Class: Hydrozoa
- Order: Trachymedusae
- Family: Rhopalonematidae
- Genus: Colobonema; Vanhöffen, 1902

= Colobonema =

Genus of hydrozoans

Colobonema is a genus of deep-sea hydrozoans.

== Species ==
There are three species:

- Colobonema apicatum Russell, 1961;
- Colobonema igneum (Vanhöffen, 1902);
- Colobonema sericeum Vanhöffen, 1902.
