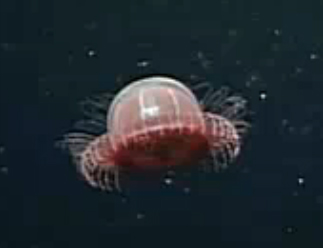

Scientific classification
- Domain: Eukaryota
- Kingdom: Animalia
- Phylum: Cnidaria
- Class: Hydrozoa
- Order: Trachymedusae
- Family: Rhopalonematidae
- Genus: Voragonema; Naumov, 1971

Species
- Voragonema laciniata; Voragonema pedunculata; Voragonema profundicola; Voragonema tatsunoko

= Voragonema =

Genus of hydrozoans

Voragonema is a genus of hydrozoans belonging to the family Rhopalonematidae. The genus comprises four species. Unlike most hydromedusae, these do not have a sessile stage. Rather, they spend their entire lives in the water column as plankton. Centripetal expansions protruding from the ring canal is a characteristic that separates this genus from other genera in the family Rhopalonematidae.

== Species ==
- Voragonema laciniata
- Voragonema pedunculata
- Voragonema profundicola
- Voragonema tatsunoko
