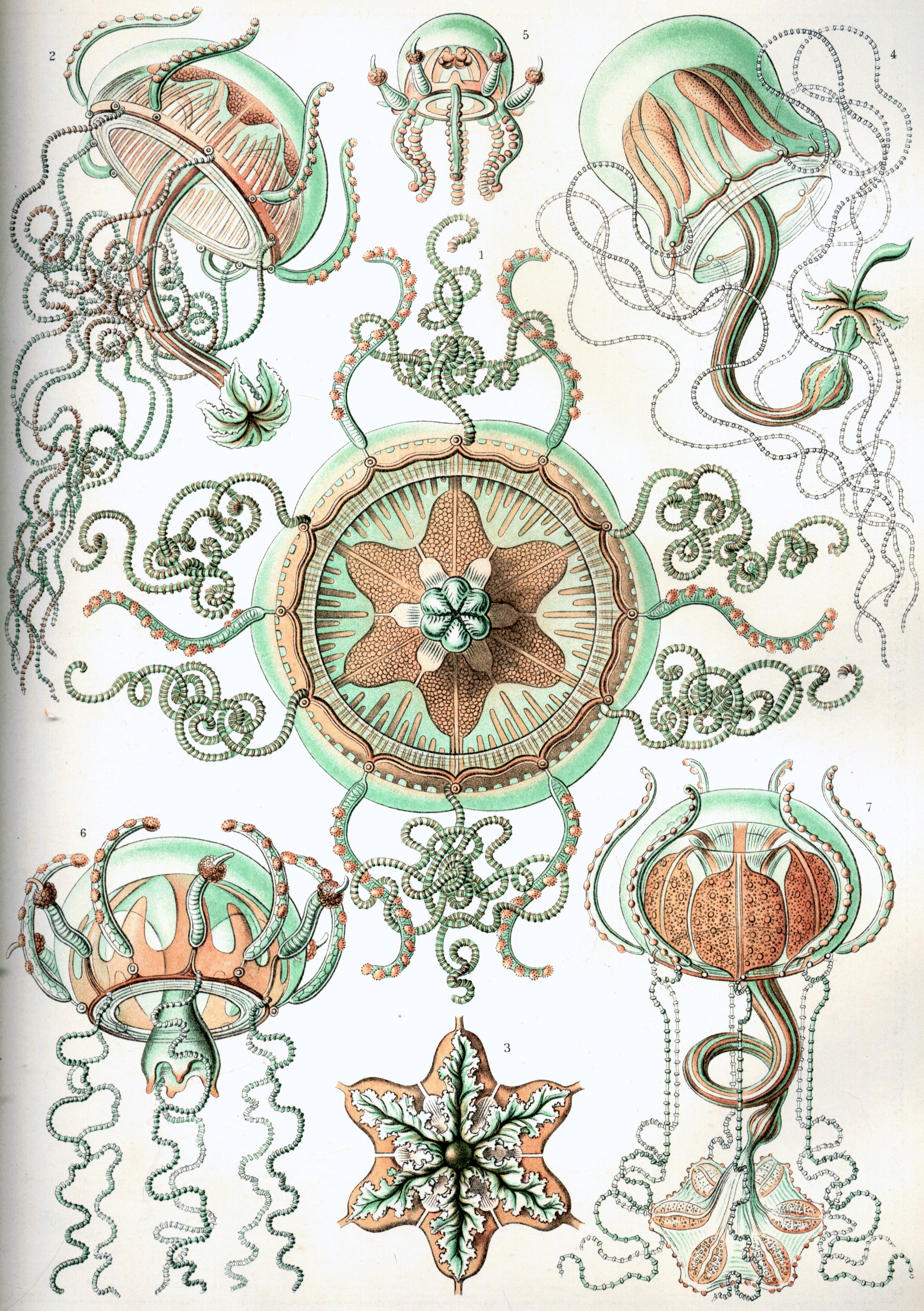
- Geryonia

Scientific classification
- Domain: Eukaryota
- Kingdom: Animalia
- Phylum: Cnidaria
- Class: Hydrozoa
- Order: Trachymedusae
- Family: Geryoniidae
- Genus: Geryonia; Péron & Lesueur, 1810
- Species: G. proboscidalis

Binomial name
- Geryonia proboscidalis (Forsskål, 1775)

Synonyms
- (Genus): Carmarina Haeckel, 1864; Carmaris Haeckel, 1879; Geryones Haeckel, 1879; (Species): Medusa proboscidalis Forsskål, 1775; Carmarina hastata Haeckel, 1864; Carmaris Glitschii Haeckel, 1879; Dianaea endrachtensis Quoy & Gaimard, 1824; Geryones elephas Haeckel, 1879; Geryonia conoides Haeckel, 1864; Geryonia dianaea Haeckel, 1879; Geryonia fungiformis Haeckel, 1864; Geryonia hexaphylla Péron & Lesueur, 1810; Geryonia umbella Haeckel, 1864

= Geryonia =

Genus of hydrozoans

Geryonia is a monotypic genus of hydrozoans in the family Geryoniidae. It is represented by the species Geryonia proboscidalis which occurs in the Mediterranean and subtropical seas. In the Mediterranean the species is more numerous and the polyps are larger than in other parts of the world. The diameter of a polyp can be up to 80 mm, while in Florida and the Bahamas it is rare to find specimens of more than 50 mm in diameter.

== Description ==
The adult polyp has six long, hollow primary tentacles interspersed with six short, stiffer tentacles that break easily. The transparent bubble of the polyp is almost a hemisphere, with a diameter of 35 to 80 mm. The dense, gelatinous pedunculus ("stalk") is cone-to-trumpet-shaped and about the same length as the diameter of the bell. Muscles form six bands along the pedunculus and allow them to move back and forth or to pull together.
