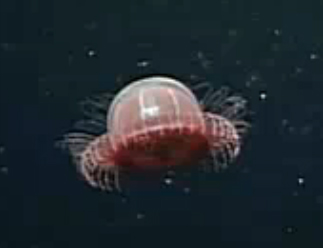

Scientific classification
- Kingdom: Animalia
- Phylum: Cnidaria
- Class: Hydrozoa
- Order: Trachymedusae
- Family: Rhopalonematidae
- Genus: Benthocodon; Larson & Harbison, 1990

Type species
- Benthocodon hyalinus Larson & Harbison, 1990

= Benthocodon =

Genus of hydrozoans

Benthocodon is a genus of hydrozoans of the family Rhopalonematidae. The genus contains two known species: Benthocodon hyalinus and Benthocodon pedunculatus, however due to the small size and red pigmentation, they can easily be confused with related genera. Unlike many hydromedusae, these jellyfish do not have a sessile stage. Rather, they spend their entire lives in the water column as plankton. The genus Benthocodon can be found near the sea floor in the Pacific Ocean from Antarctica to California to the Arctic Ocean.

The benthocodon's predators are mainly larger fish. They primarily feeds off of crustaceous and foraminiferan forms. They live in the Pacific Ocean from California to Antarctica to the Arctic Ocean near the sea floor. They eat by paralyzing their prey using their red tentacles then they pull it in to consume. They also have a red inner membrane which helps when hunting due to it masking the bioluminescence of their prey so they can eat without attracting predators.
