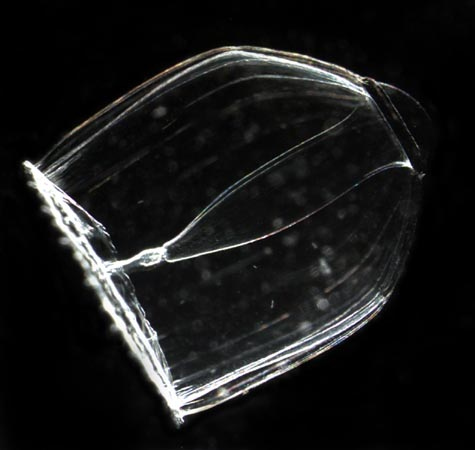

Scientific classification
- Domain: Eukaryota
- Kingdom: Animalia
- Phylum: Cnidaria
- Class: Hydrozoa
- Order: Trachymedusae
- Family: Rhopalonematidae
- Genus: Aglantha; Haeckel, 1879

Synonyms
- Agliscra Haeckel, 1879; Circe Brandt, 1835

= Aglantha =

Genus of hydrozoans

Aglantha is a genus of deep-sea hydrozoans of the family Rhopalonematidae.

== Species ==
There are four species recognized in the genus Aglantha:

- Aglantha digitale (O. F. Müller, 1776)
- Aglantha elata (Haeckel, 1879)
- Aglantha elongata (Lesson, 1843)
- Aglantha intermedia Bigelow, 1909
