= Pantachogon =

Scientific classification
- Domain: Eukaryota
- Kingdom: Animalia
- Phylum: Cnidaria
- Class: Hydrozoa
- Order: Trachymedusae
- Family: Rhopalonematidae
- Genus: Pantachogon; Maas, 1893

Species
- Pantachogon haeckeli; Pantachogon militare; Pantachogon scotti

Genus of hydrozoans

Pantachogon is a genus of hydrozoans of the family Rhopalonematidae. The genus includes three species.
