= Amphogona =

Scientific classification
- Domain: Eukaryota
- Kingdom: Animalia
- Phylum: Cnidaria
- Class: Hydrozoa
- Order: Trachymedusae
- Family: Rhopalonematidae
- Genus: Amphogona; Browne, 1905

Genus of hydrozoans

Amphogona is a genus of deep-sea hydrozoans of the family of Rhopalonematidae. It has a cosmopolitan distribution in tropical to temperate oceans.

== Species ==
There are three species:

- Amphogona apicata Kramp, 1957
- Amphogona apsteini (Vanhöffen, 1902)
- Amphogona pusilla Hartlaub, 1909
