= Aglaura =

Aglaura may refer to:

- Aglaura (play), a play by Sir John Suckling set in Persia
- An alternative name for the Greek mythological figures called Aglaulus
- Aglaura (cnidarian), a genus of hydrozoans in the family Rhopalonematidae
- Nessaea aglaura, a species of brush-footed butterfly of the genus Nessaea
