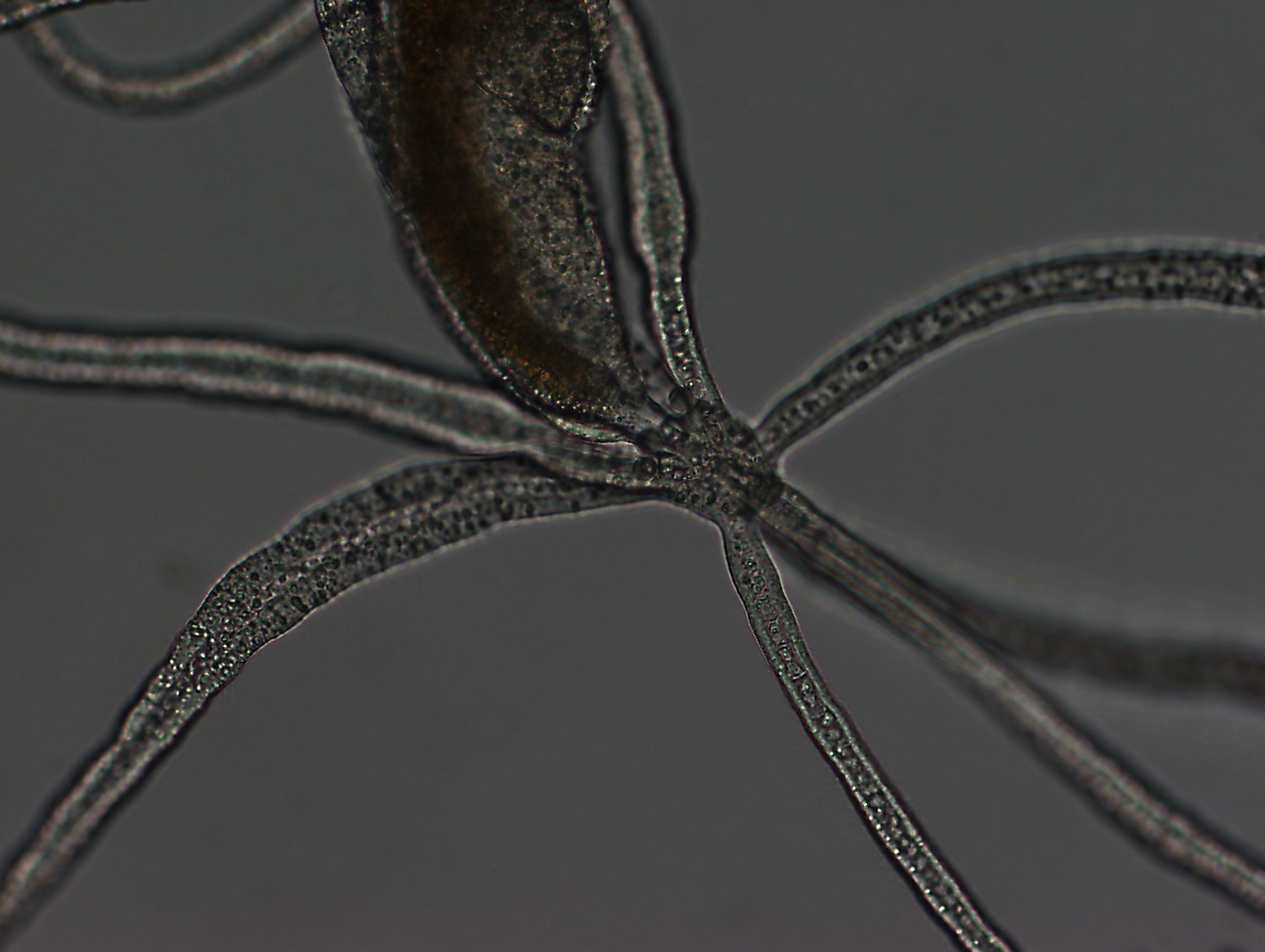
- Halammohydrida Octopodides

Scientific classification
- Kingdom: Animalia
- Phylum: Cnidaria
- Class: Hydrozoa
- Order: Actinulida
- Family: Halammohydridae

= Halammohydridae =

Family of hydrozoans

Halammohydridae is a family of cnidarians belonging to the order Actinulida.

Genera:

- Halammohydra Remane, 1927
