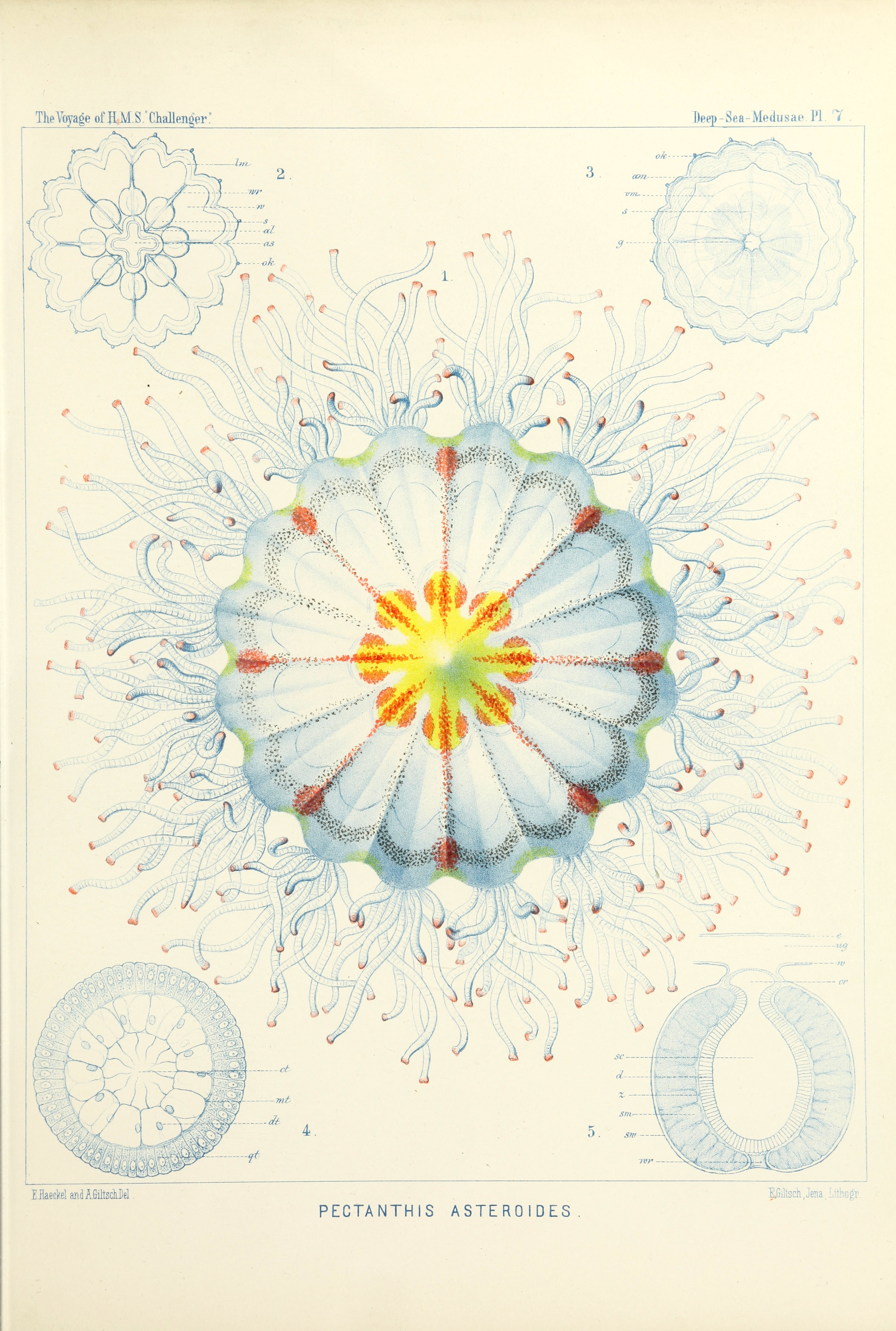
- Pectanthis asteroides

Scientific classification
- Kingdom: Animalia
- Phylum: Cnidaria
- Class: Hydrozoa
- Order: Trachymedusae
- Family: Ptychogastriidae

= Ptychogastriidae =

Cnidarian family with three genera

Ptychogastriidae is a family of cnidarians belonging to the order Trachymedusae.

Genera:

- Glaciambulata Galea, 2016
- Ptychogastria Allman, 1878
- Tesserogastria Beyer, 1958
