= Petasidae =

Scientific classification
- Kingdom: Animalia
- Phylum: Cnidaria
- Class: Hydrozoa
- Order: Trachymedusae
- Family: Petasidae

Family of hydrozoans

Petasidae is a family of cnidarians belonging to the order Trachymedusae.

Genera:

- Petasiella Uchida, 1947
- Petasus Haeckel, 1879
