= Liriope =

Liriope may refer to:

- Liriope (nymph), the mother of Narcissus by the river-god Cephissus, according to Ovid's Metamorphoses.
- Liriope (plant), a genus of lilioid monocot plants, named for the nymph
- Liriope (cnidarian), a genus of hydrozoans in the family Geryoniidae
- 414 Liriope, a main belt asteroid, also named for the nymph
