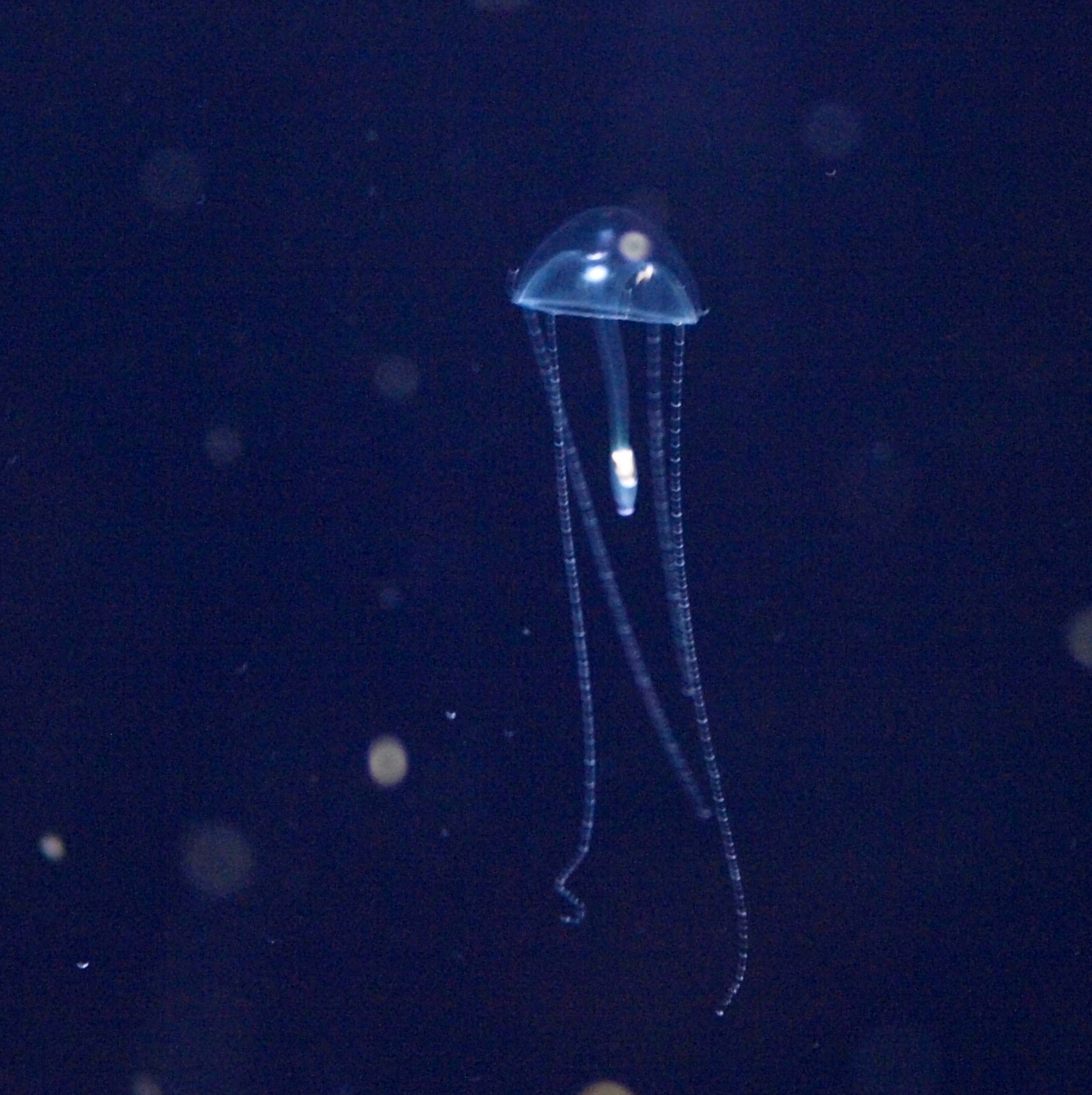
- Liriope tetraphylla

Scientific classification
- Kingdom: Animalia
- Phylum: Cnidaria
- Class: Hydrozoa
- Order: Trachymedusae
- Family: Geryoniidae; Eschscholtz, 1829

Genera
- See text

= Geryoniidae =

Family of hydrozoans

The Geryoniidae are a family of hydrozoans in the order Trachymedusae.

== List of genera ==
- Geryonia Péron & Lesueur, 1810
- Liriope Lesson, 1843

Nomen dubium

- Heptarradiata Zamponi & Gezano, 1989
- Octorradiata Zamponi & Gezano, 1989
- Pentarradiata Zamponi & Gezano, 1989
