= Lessonia =

Lessonia may refer to:

- Lessonia (alga), a genus in the family Lessoniaceae
- Lessonia (bird), a genus in the family Tyrannidae
- Lessonia, a synonym for Aglaura, a genus of hydrozoans
