= Otohydra =

Scientific classification
- Domain: Eukaryota
- Kingdom: Animalia
- Phylum: Cnidaria
- Class: Hydrozoa
- Order: Actinulida
- Family: Otohydridae; Swedmark & Teissier, 1958
- Genus: Otohydra; Swedmark & Teissier, 1958

Genus of hydrozoans

Otohydra is a genus of cnidarians belonging to the monotypic family Otohydridae.

Species:

- Otohydra tremulans Lacassagne, 1973
- Otohydra vagans Swedmark & Teissier, 1958
