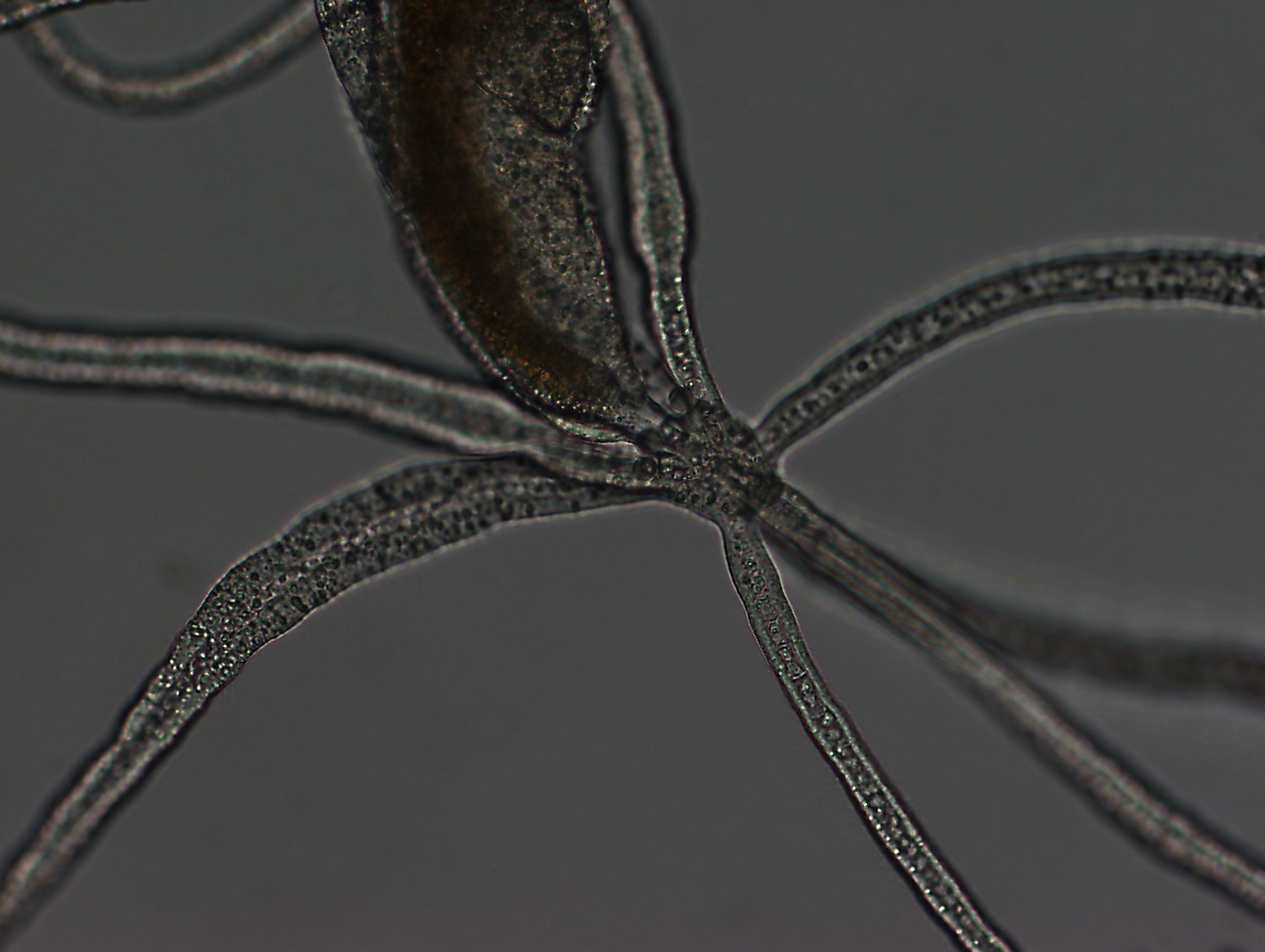
- Halammohydra octopodides

Scientific classification
- Kingdom: Animalia
- Phylum: Cnidaria
- Class: Hydrozoa
- Subclass: Trachylinae
- Order: Actinulida; Swedmark & Teissier, 1958

Families
- Halammohydridae Remane, 1927; Otohydridae Swedmark & Teissier, 1958

= Actinulida =

Order of medusoid hydrozoans

Actinulida are an order of hydrozoans in the subclass Trachylinae. Very small, medusoid Hydrozoa without polyp phase, living in the sand interstitial, solitary, bell entirely or very much reduced, epidermis ciliated, 1-2 whorls of tentacles, statocysts present or not, club shaped and derived of ecto- and entodermal tissue; cnidome may include stenoteles.
