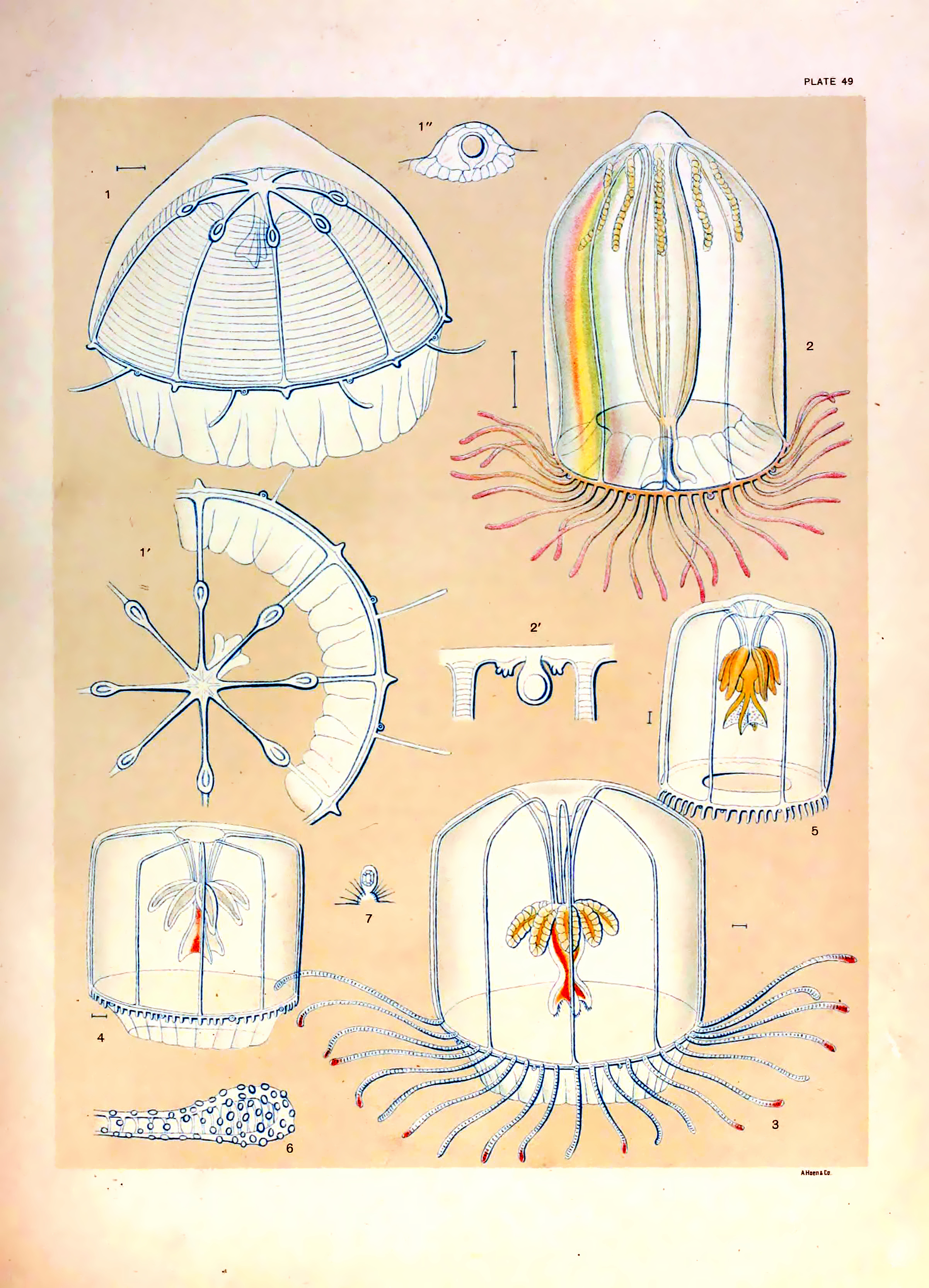

Scientific classification
- Kingdom: Animalia
- Phylum: Cnidaria
- Class: Hydrozoa
- Order: Trachymedusae
- Family: Rhopalonematidae
- Genus: Aglaura; Péron & Lesueur, 1810
- Species: A. hemistoma

Binomial name
- Aglaura hemistoma Péron & Lesueur, 1810

Synonyms
- Genus synonymy: Lessonia Eydoux & Soulyet, 1852; Stauraglaura Haeckel, 1879; Species synonymy: Aglantha globuligera Haeckel, 1879; Aglantha octogona Bigelow, 1904; Aglaura ciliata Perkins, 1906; Aglaura laterna Haeckel, 1879; Aglaura Nausicaa Haeckel, 1879; Aglaura peronii Leuckart, 1856; Aglaura prismatica Maas, 1897; Lessonia radiata Soulyet, 1852; Stauraglaura tetragonima Haeckel, 1879

= Aglaura hemistoma =

Genus of hydrozoans

Aglaura is a monotypic genus of deep-sea hydrozoan in the family Rhopalonematidae. It is represented by the species Aglaura hemistoma. It has a cosmopolitan distribution in tropical to temperate oceans. A. hemistoma are omnivorous creatures, feeding on protistan and microplanktonic prey. They utilize water current flow fields and ambush predation strategies for prey capture. Flow fields are generated by their tentacles and nonmotile prey are easily ingested as they are directed towards the manubrium. Ambush capture is achieved by triggering quick tentacle contractions upon direct contact to move prey towards the manubrium.
