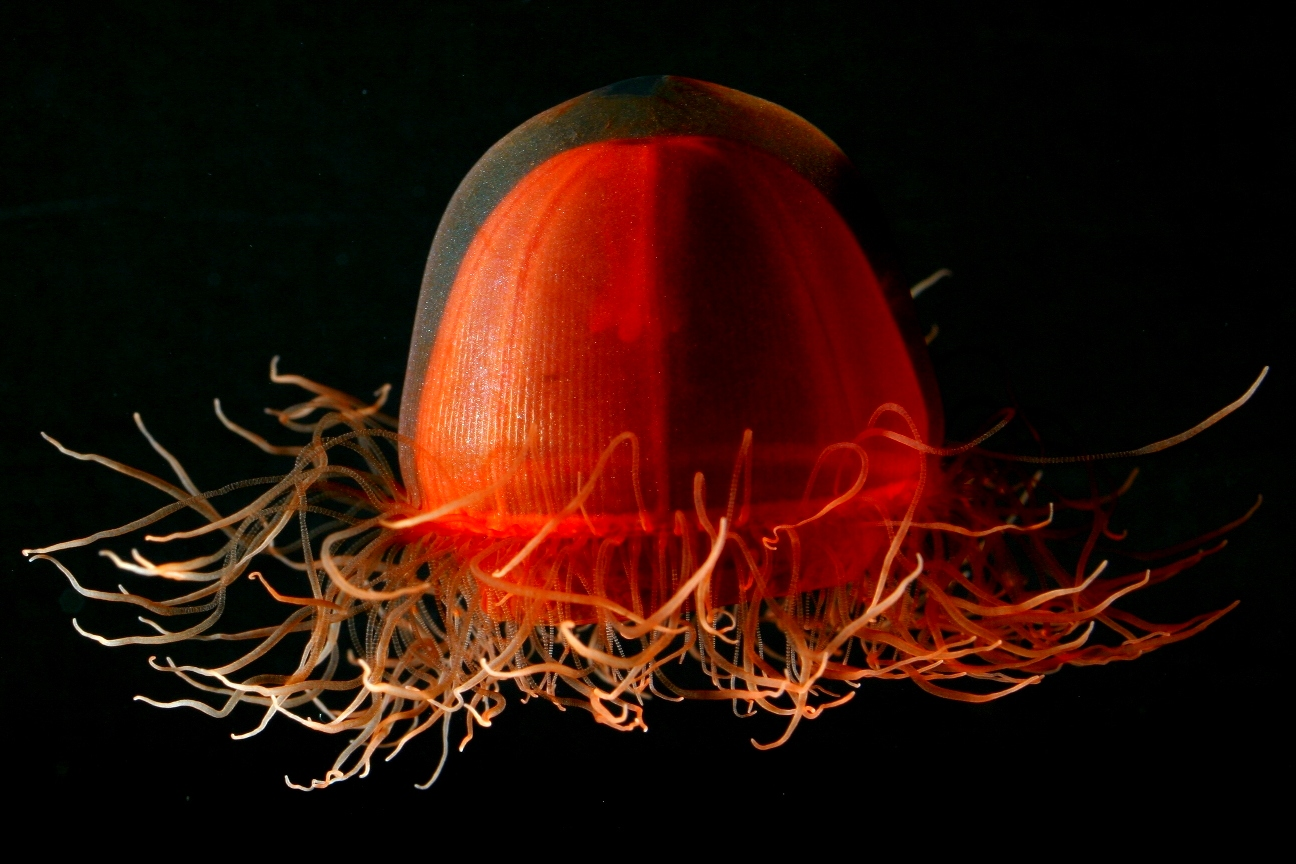

Scientific classification
- Kingdom: Animalia
- Phylum: Cnidaria
- Class: Hydrozoa
- Order: Trachymedusae
- Family: Rhopalonematidae
- Genus: Crossota; Vanhoffen, 1902

Species
- Crossota alba; Crossota brunnea; Crossota millsae; Crossota norvegica; Crossota rufobrunnea

= Crossota =

Genus of hydrozoans

Crossota is a genus of hydrozoans of the family Rhopalonematidae. The genus comprises five species. Unlike most hydromedusae, these do not have a sessile stage. Rather, they spend their entire lives in the water column as plankton. The genus Crossota is widespread throughout the oceans.

== Species ==
- Crossota alba
- Crossota brunnea
- Crossota millsae
- Crossota norvegica
- Crossota rufobrunnea
