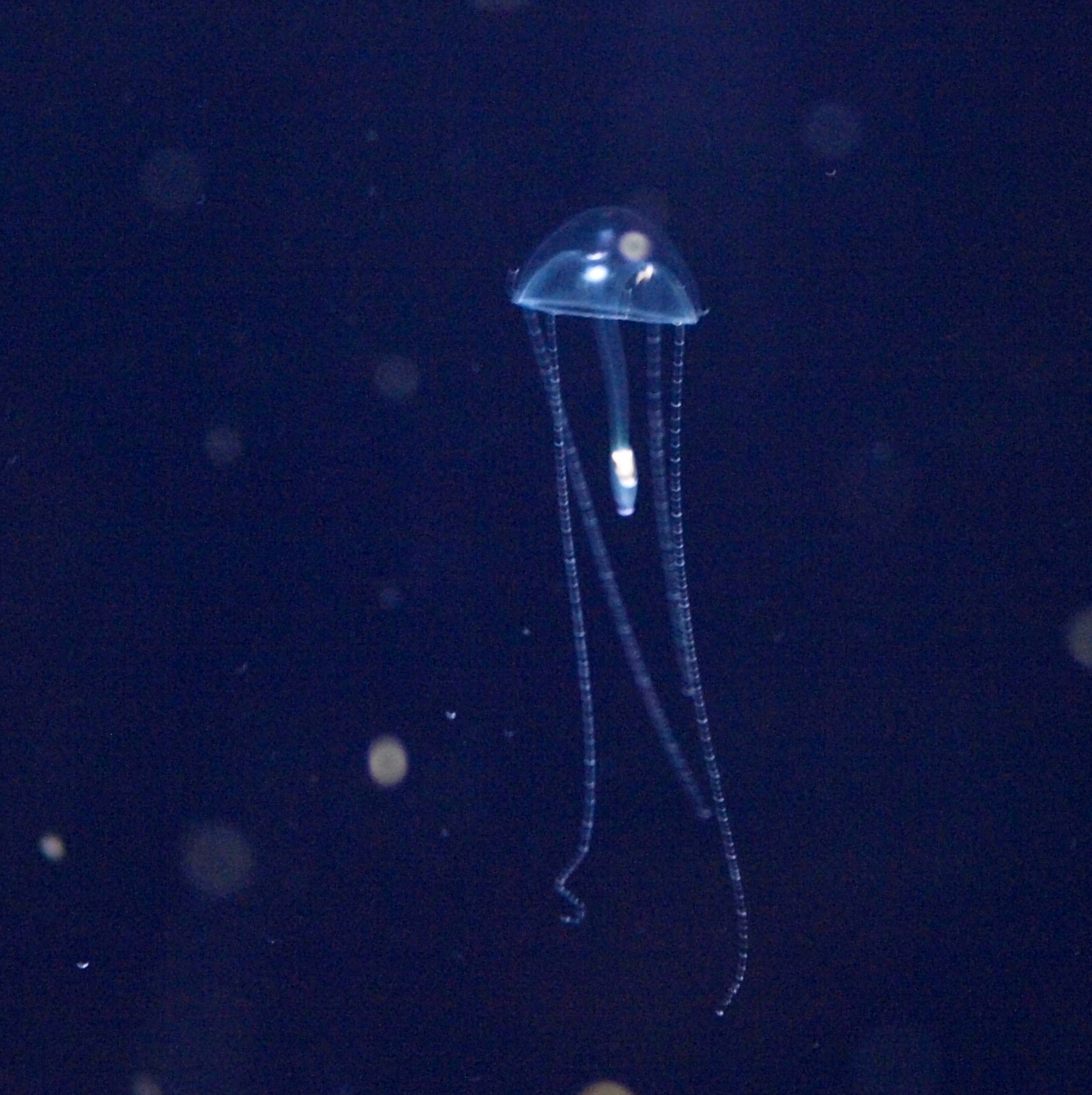
- Liriope tetraphylla

Scientific classification
- Kingdom: Animalia
- Phylum: Cnidaria
- Class: Hydrozoa
- Order: Trachymedusae
- Family: Geryoniidae
- Genus: Liriope; Lesson, 1843
- Species: L. tetraphylla

Binomial name
- Liriope tetraphylla (Chamisso & Eysenhardt, 1821)

Synonyms
- Dianaea exigua Quoy & Gaimard, 1827; Geryonia tetraphylla Chamisso & Eysenhardt, 1821; Liriope catharinensis Müller, 1859; Liriope cerasiformis Lesson, 1843; Liriope conirostris Haeckel, 1879; Liriope eurybia Haeckel, 1864; Liriope scutigera McCrady, 1859

= Liriope tetraphylla =

Species of hydrozoan

Liriope is a genus of hydrozoan in the family Geryoniidae. It contains only one species, Liriope tetraphylla.

== Description ==
Liriope tetraphylla has marginal tentacles, a manubrium, and gonads that are all green or rose-red in colour. It has a nearly hemispherical umbrella which is normally 10 to 30 mm wide. The exumbrella has four interradial and four perradial nematocyst tracks that are short in length. It has a well-developed velum. Normally, there are four radial canals that are straight. The ring canal is broad, and each quadrant has 1 to 3 (and possibly more) centriipedal canals that are short and blind. A marginal nematocyst ring is present. It has thick jelly, particularly in the region towards the apex.

The manubria of Liriope tetraphylla extend from a long gastric pendicule. These manubria are normally 1 to 3 times the height of the umbrella. There are four lips on the mouth that are either simple or slightly crenulated. The subumbrellar part of the radial canals have four gonads that are leaf-shaped and flattened. These gonads may vary greatly in size and shape.

This species has eight ecto-endodermal statocysts that are enclosed within mesogloea. There are four perradial marginal tentacles that are hollow and long and have nematocyst rings. There are also four interradial tentacles that are small and solid. these have adaxial nematocyst clusters.

=== Polyp stage ===
Liriope tetraphylla does not have a polyp stage. Its medusae are always present.

== Distribution ==
This hydrozoan is known to occur in the North Sea, North, East, and West South Atlantic Ocean, the Mediterranean, and in the Indo-Pacific Oceans. It is also known to occur in the English Channel, being carried there by currents from the Atlantic Ocean.

== Ecology and habitat ==
Liriope tetraphylla lives in the epipelagic zone, remaining there throughout its life. It occurs in warm and tropical marine environments, floating in massive shoals, normally near to the surface.
