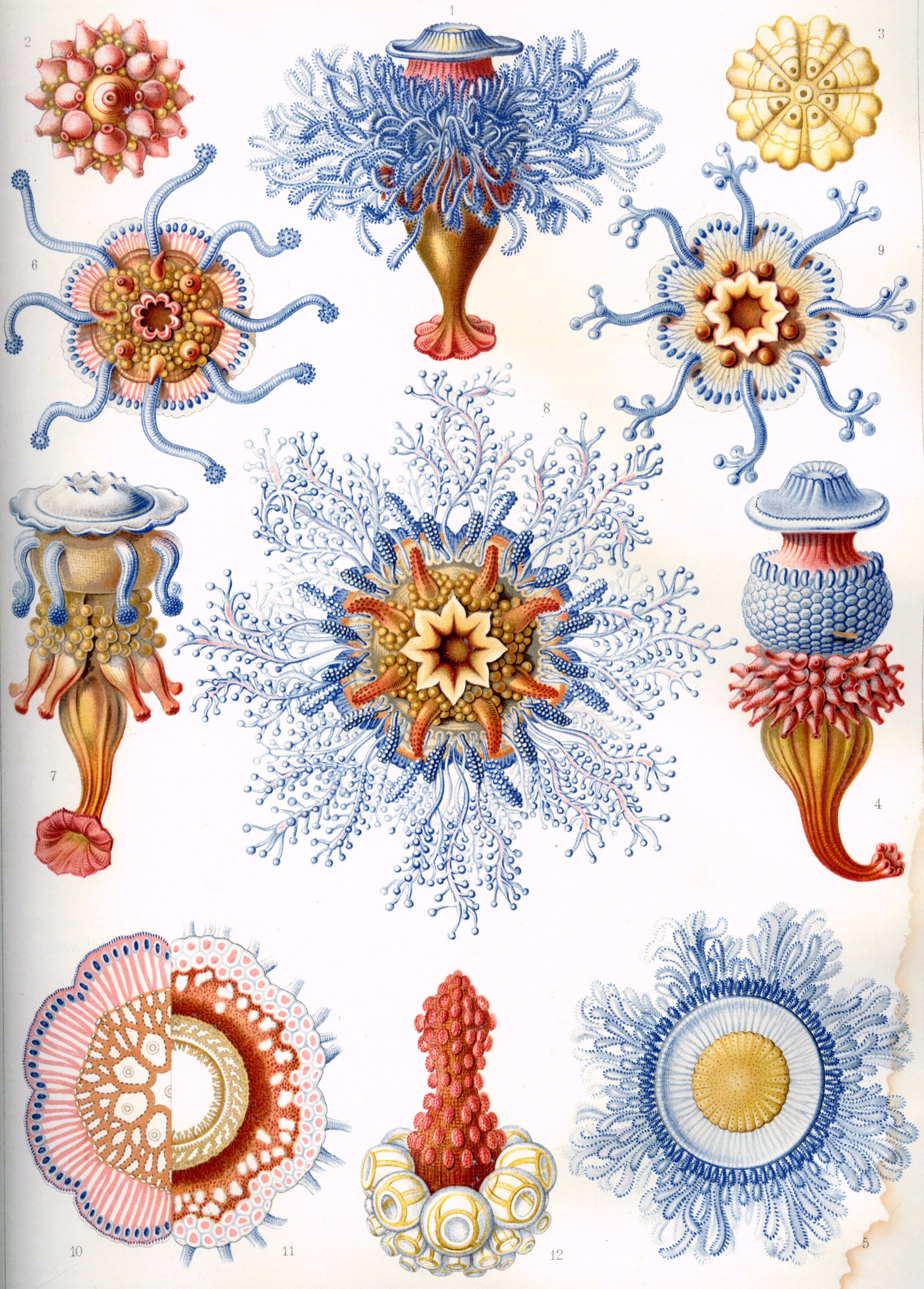
- Siphonophorae from Ernst Haeckel's 1904 Kunstformen der Natur

Scientific classification
- Kingdom: Animalia
- Phylum: Cnidaria
- Class: Hydrozoa
- Subclass: Hydroidolina; Collins, 2000

Orders
- See text

Synonyms
- Hydroida; Hydroidae; Hydroidolinae; Hydroidomedusa; Hydroidomedusae; Leptolida Haeckel, 1879; Leptolina Haeckel, 1879; Leptolinae Haeckel, 1879; Hydroidida

= Hydroidolina =

Subclass of hydrozoans

Hydroidolina is a subclass of Hydrozoa and makes up 90% of the class. Controversy surrounds who the sister groups of Hydroidolina are, but research has shown that three orders remain consistent as direct relatives: Siphonophorae, Anthoathecata, and Leptothecata.

== Description and background ==
The phylum Cnidaria contains two clades: Anthozoa and Medusozoa. There are around 3800 species within the clade Medusozoa and it consists of Cubozoans, Scyphozoans, and Hydrozoans.

Hydroidolina are small predatory animals, ranging in 8-30 millimeters in size, exhibiting radial symmetry and are diploblastic (developed from two embryonic layers: ectoderm and endoderm).

The classification below is based on the World Register of Marine Species:

Subclass Hydroidolina

- Order Anthoathecata
- Order Leptothecata
- Order Siphonophorae

== Distribution ==
Hydroidolina are commonly found in a variety of marine environments across the world such as deepwater caves or brackish and fresh shallow waters, and can exist as solitary or colonial. Benthic polyps can be found on a variety of hard substrates, including both natural and artificial surfaces. Many of them live on other organisms such as fish, tunicates, algae, and crustaceans. Furthermore, they prefer not to settle on sand or similarly textured surfaces unless fauna or flora is present.

Because Hydroidomedusian polyps often settle on other organisms, they are also subject to partake in symbiotic relationships. For example, the bivalve mantle cavity of a mollusk provides a sheltered environment, transporting food due to the current. In exchange, the hydroid protects against intruders.

== Diet ==
Hydroidolina are carnivorous suspension feeders. Motile medusa use their cnidocytes and tentacles to capture prey.

== Anatomy and morphology ==
Cnidarians are united by the common characteristic of having a specialized cell called a cnidocyte, which contains an explosive organelle called a cnidocyst, or stinging cell. In Hydrozoans, the cnidocysts are formed from interstitial stem cells in the ectoderm and are used for prey capture and anti-predator defense.

Cnidarians are known to occur in two body forms: the polyp form which is benthic and "stalk-like," and the medusae form, which is commonly known as the "bell" form.

Polyp forms are sessile as adults, with a single opening (the mouth/anus) to the digestive cavity facing up with tentacles surrounding it. Medusa forms are motile, with the mouth and tentacles hanging down from an umbrella-shaped bell.

Though some outlier Hydrozoans go through a polypoid (polyp) and medusa stage, Hydroidolina, which comprises almost all hydrozoans, goes through an asexual polypoid stage where the polyp fixed to a substrate and a sexual hydroid stage varying from free-swimming medusa to a gonophore that remains attached to the polyp.

An important characteristic of the Hydroidolina is the presence and formation of an exoskeleton. The exoskeleton varies in chemical composition, structural rigidity, thickness, and coverage within the different regions of the colony and protects the coenosarc of the polypoid stage. It originates as epidermal secretions, with the exosarc being produced first by glandular epidermal cells. The exoskeleton can either be bilayered and contain both the exosarc (outer layer) and perisarc (inner layer) or corneous (just perisarc). The exoskeleton contains anchoring structures such as desmocytes and "perisarc extensions."

== Life cycle and reproduction ==
The Hydroidolina follows a biphasic life cycle, which alternates in occurrence as planula larva, asexual colonial sessile polyps and free-swimming sexual medusa, not all of which may be present in the one life cycle of the Hydroidolina.

Within its benthic phase, polyps of these hydroids attach to soft tissues on organisms, such as the mantle of a mollusk, and reproduce asexually by budding.

In the sexual medusa stage, gonophores, which are the reproductive organ that produces gametes, and will stay attached to the polyp as a reduced medusa stage but will sometimes, often rarely, form to become their own medusae.

== Taxonomy ==
=== Alternate classifications ===
Other hydrozoan classifications, which are beset by paraphyly however, are still often seen. They do not unite the Leptolinae in a monophyletic taxon and thus do not have any merit according to modern understanding of hydrozoan phylogeny. The alternate name Leptolinae (or Leptolina) was used in older sources for Hydroidolina.

The obsolete name Hydroida was used for a paraphyletic grouping that is now considered synonymous with Hydroidolina but did not include the colonial jellies of the order Siphonophorae.

== Ecological Impact ==
The complexity of fauna environments in shallow and deep waters is only increased by benthic polyp colonization. These hydroid colonies affect many spatial and temporal settlement patterns of other benthic species due to providing a habitat for a wide variety of organisms, thus promoting species richness and abundance.

These sessile invertebrates could prove to be useful as a measure of environmental changes within their own colonies as well as for changes within near marine environments pertaining to temporal and spatial changes to species distribution and composition, temperature, and food.
