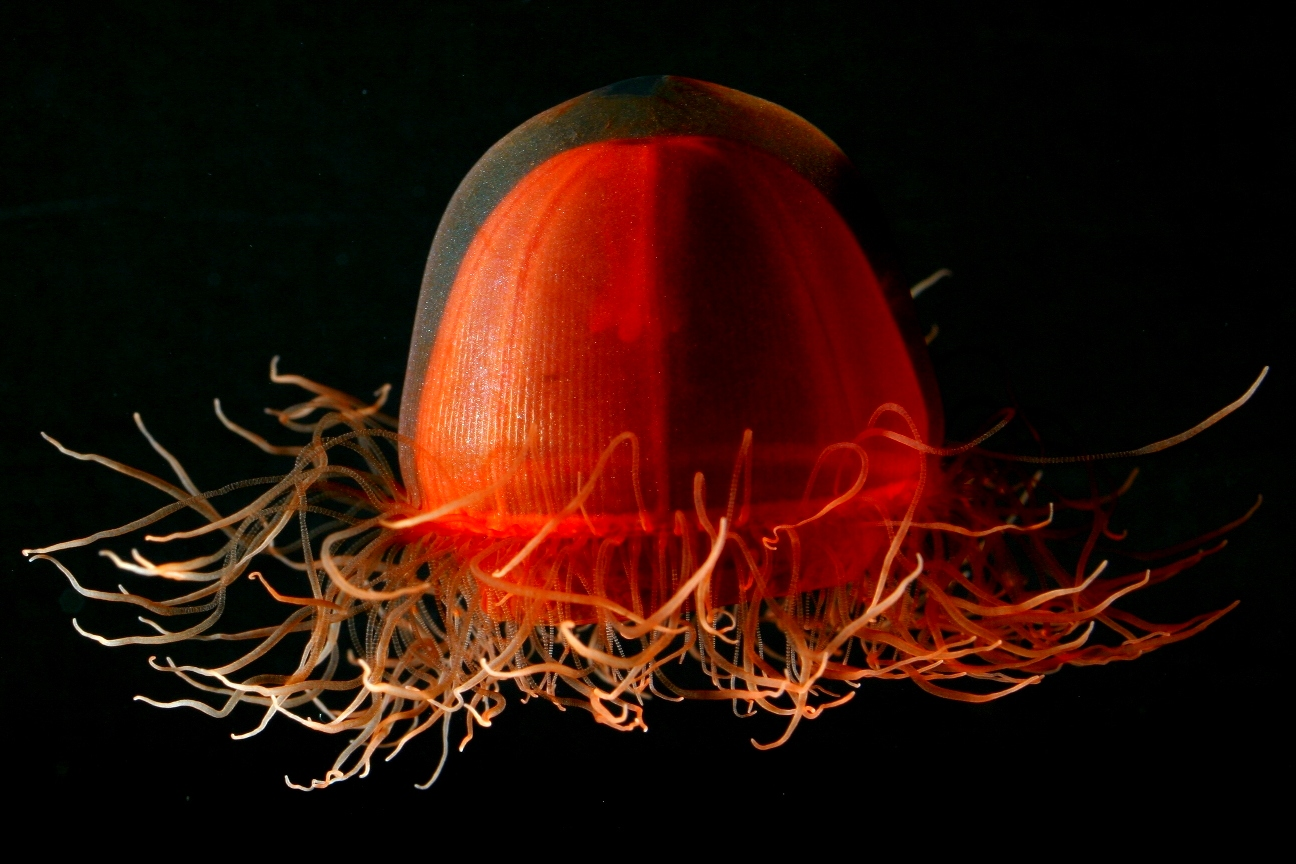
- Crossota norvegica

Scientific classification
- Kingdom: Animalia
- Phylum: Cnidaria
- Class: Hydrozoa
- Order: Trachymedusae
- Family: Rhopalonematidae; Russell, 1953

Genera
- See text

= Rhopalonematidae =

Family of hydrozoans

Rhopalonematidae is a family of hydrozoans. The family comprises 15 genera and 36 species.

== Genera ==
- Aglantha (4 species)
- Aglaura (monotypic – Aglaura hemistoma)
- Amphogona (3 species)
- Arctapodema (4 species)
- Benthocodon (2 species)
- Colobonema (3 species)
- Crossota (5 species)
- Pantachogon (3 species)
- Persa (monotypic – Persa incolorata)
- Ransonia (monotypic – Ransonia krampi)
- Rhopalonema (2 species)
- Sminthea (2 species)
- Tetrorchis (monotypic – Tetrorchis erythrogaster)
- Vampyrocrossota (monotypic – Vampyrocrossota childressi)
- Voragonema (4 species)
