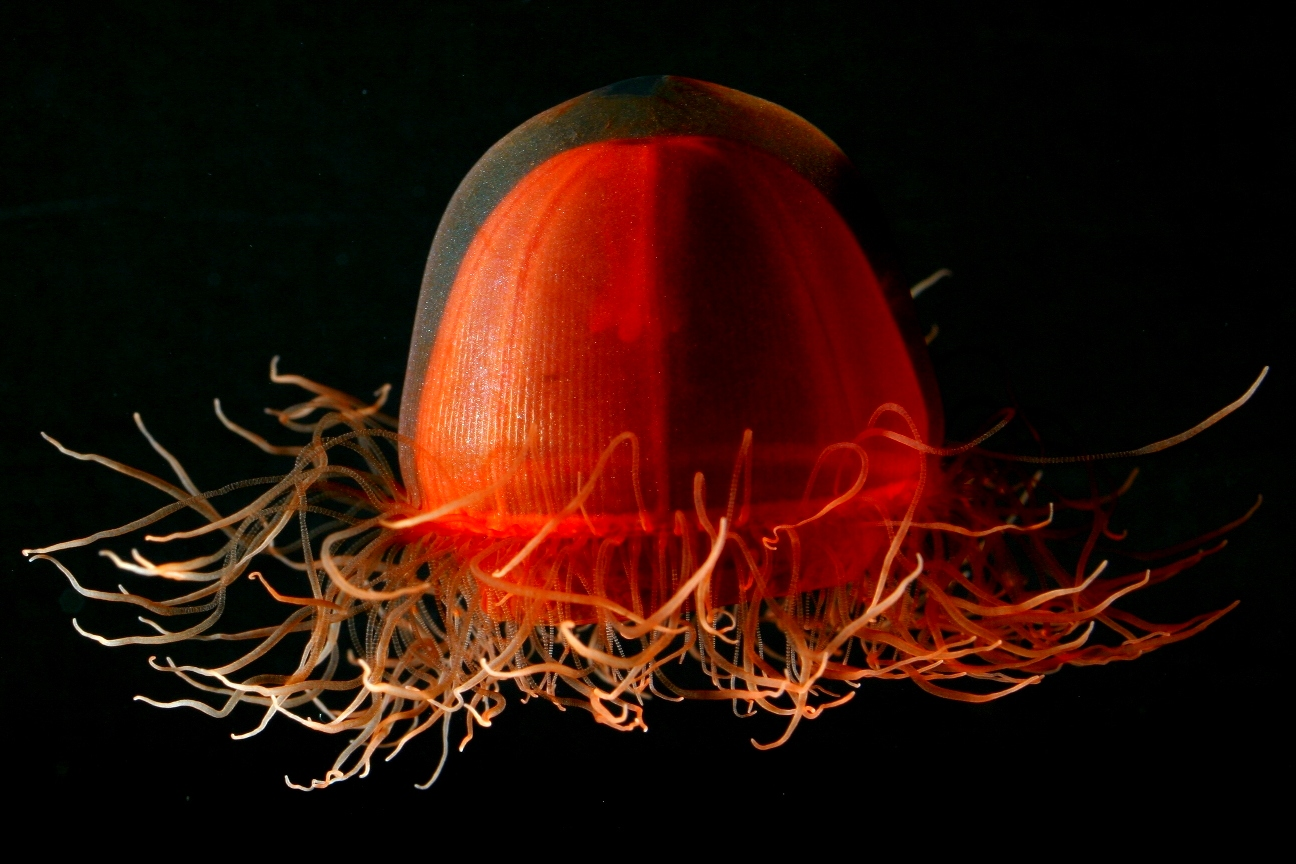
- Crossota sp.

Scientific classification
- Kingdom: Animalia
- Phylum: Cnidaria
- Class: Hydrozoa
- Subclass: Trachylinae
- Order: Trachymedusae; Haeckel, 1866 (1879)

Families
- Geryoniidae; Halicreatidae; Petasidae; Ptychogastriidae; Rhopalonematidae

= Trachymedusae =

Order of hydrozoans

Trachymedusae belong to the phylum Cnidaria and the class Hydrozoa. The Trachymedusae include five families, among which are 30 genera and around 50 species in all. The family Rhopalonematidae has the greatest diversity.

== Description ==
Trachymedusae are identifiable by their umbrella edge which lacks any lobes. The tentacles at the edge of the umbrellas are solid or solid and hollow, there is a thickened tissue ring that has a large number of nematocysts, the radial canals number from four to six to eight and more than eight, though eight is the most common amount found. The sensory clubs can be open or closed with the endodermal axis. The gonads are generally located at the radial canal or where the radial canal and the manubrium connect. The cnidome may have stenoteles. Trachymedusae reproduce sexually during the medusa stage lacking a polyp stage.

Trachymedusae primarily are found in the deep ocean, where they are recorded at depths of 70 to 2,000 metres (230 to 6,562 feet).

== Interactions with humans ==
Interactions with humans are few as this species primarily occurs at great depth. Although hydrozoans had increased in numbers by 2014, the increase in Liriope tetraphylla, a species of Trachymedusae, did not appear to be affecting the total zooplankton populations they prey upon in the Sea of Marmara.
