= Gelatinous zooplankton =

Fragile and often translucent animals that live in the water column

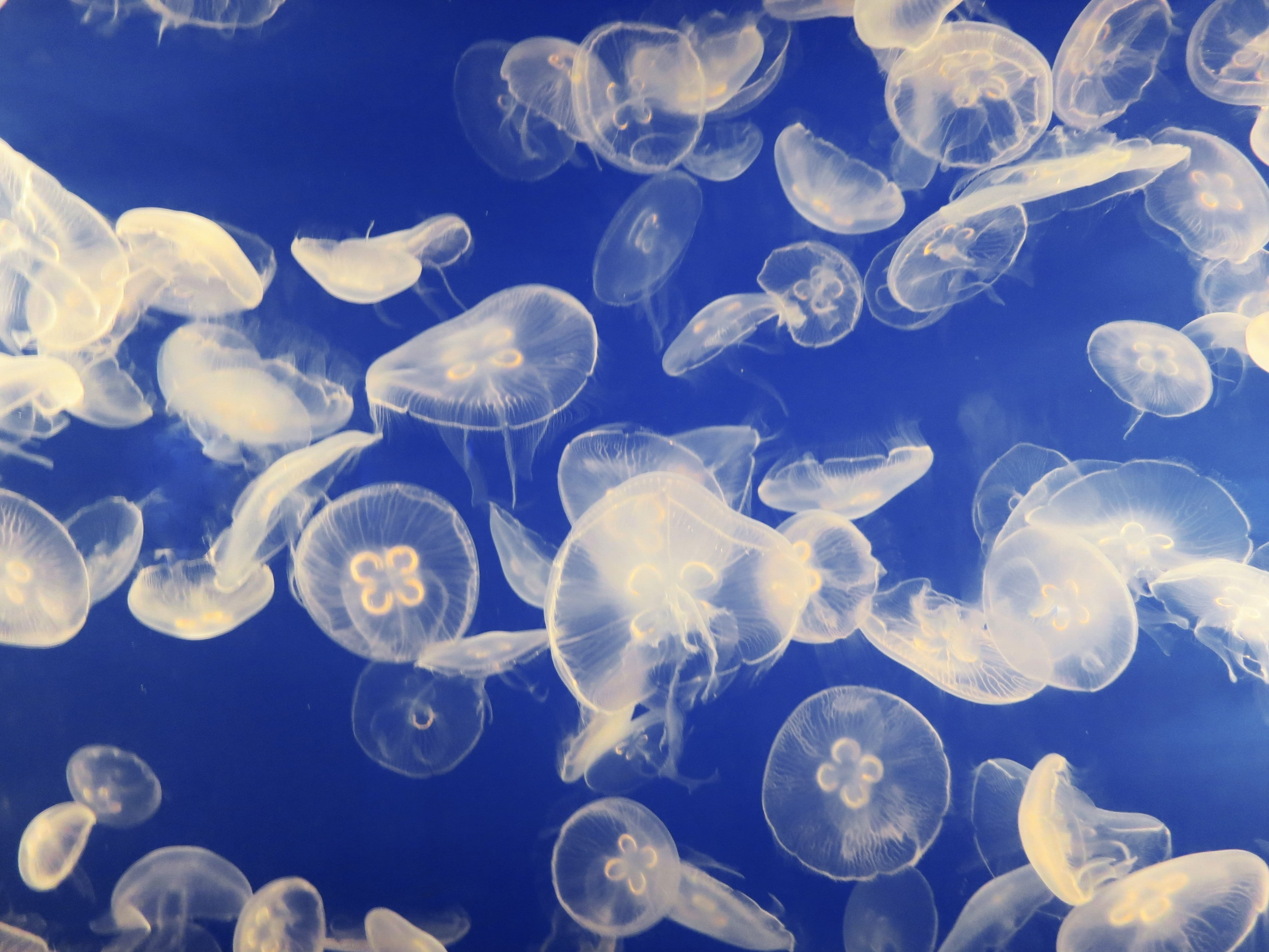
Jellyfish are easy to capture and digest and may be more important as food sources than was previously thought.

Gelatinous zooplankton are fragile animals that live in the water column in the ocean. Their delicate bodies have no hard parts and are easily damaged or destroyed. Gelatinous zooplankton are often transparent. All jellyfish are gelatinous zooplankton, but not all gelatinous zooplankton are jellyfish. The most commonly encountered organisms include ctenophores, medusae, salps, and Chaetognatha in coastal waters. However, almost all marine phyla, including Annelida, Mollusca and Arthropoda, contain gelatinous species, but many of those odd species live in the open ocean and the deep sea and are less available to the casual ocean observer. Many gelatinous plankters utilize mucous structures in order to filter feed. Gelatinous zooplankton have also been called Gelata.

== As prey ==
Jellyfish are slow swimmers, and most species form part of the plankton. Traditionally jellyfish have been viewed as trophic dead ends, minor players in the marine food web, gelatinous organisms with a body plan largely based on water that offers little nutritional value or interest for other organisms apart from a few specialised predators such as the ocean sunfish and the leatherback sea turtle. That view has recently been challenged. Jellyfish, and more gelatinous zooplankton in general, which include salps and ctenophores, are very diverse, fragile with no hard parts, difficult to see and monitor, subject to rapid population swings and often live inconveniently far from shore or deep in the ocean. It is difficult for scientists to detect and analyse jellyfish in the guts of predators, since they turn to mush when eaten and are rapidly digested. But jellyfish bloom in vast numbers, and it has been shown they form major components in the diets of tuna, spearfish and swordfish as well as various birds and invertebrates such as octopus, sea cucumbers, crabs and amphipods. "Despite their low energy density, the contribution of jellyfish to the energy budgets of predators may be much greater than assumed because of rapid digestion, low capture costs, availability, and selective feeding on the more energy-rich components. Feeding on jellyfish may make marine predators susceptible to ingestion of plastics."

== As predators ==
According to a 2017 study, narcomedusae consume the greatest diversity of mesopelagic prey, followed by physonect siphonophores, ctenophores and cephalopods. The importance of the so-called "jelly web" is only beginning to be understood, but it seems medusae, ctenophores and siphonophores can be key predators in deep pelagic food webs with ecological impacts similar to predator fish and squid. Traditionally gelatinous predators were thought ineffectual providers of marine trophic pathways, but they appear to have substantial and integral roles in deep pelagic food webs.

Pelagic siphonophores, a diverse group of modular cnidarians, are found at most depths of the ocean - from the surface, like the Portuguese man of war, to the deep sea. They play important roles in ocean ecosystems, and are among the most abundant gelatinous predators.

Siphonophorae; Hydrozoa

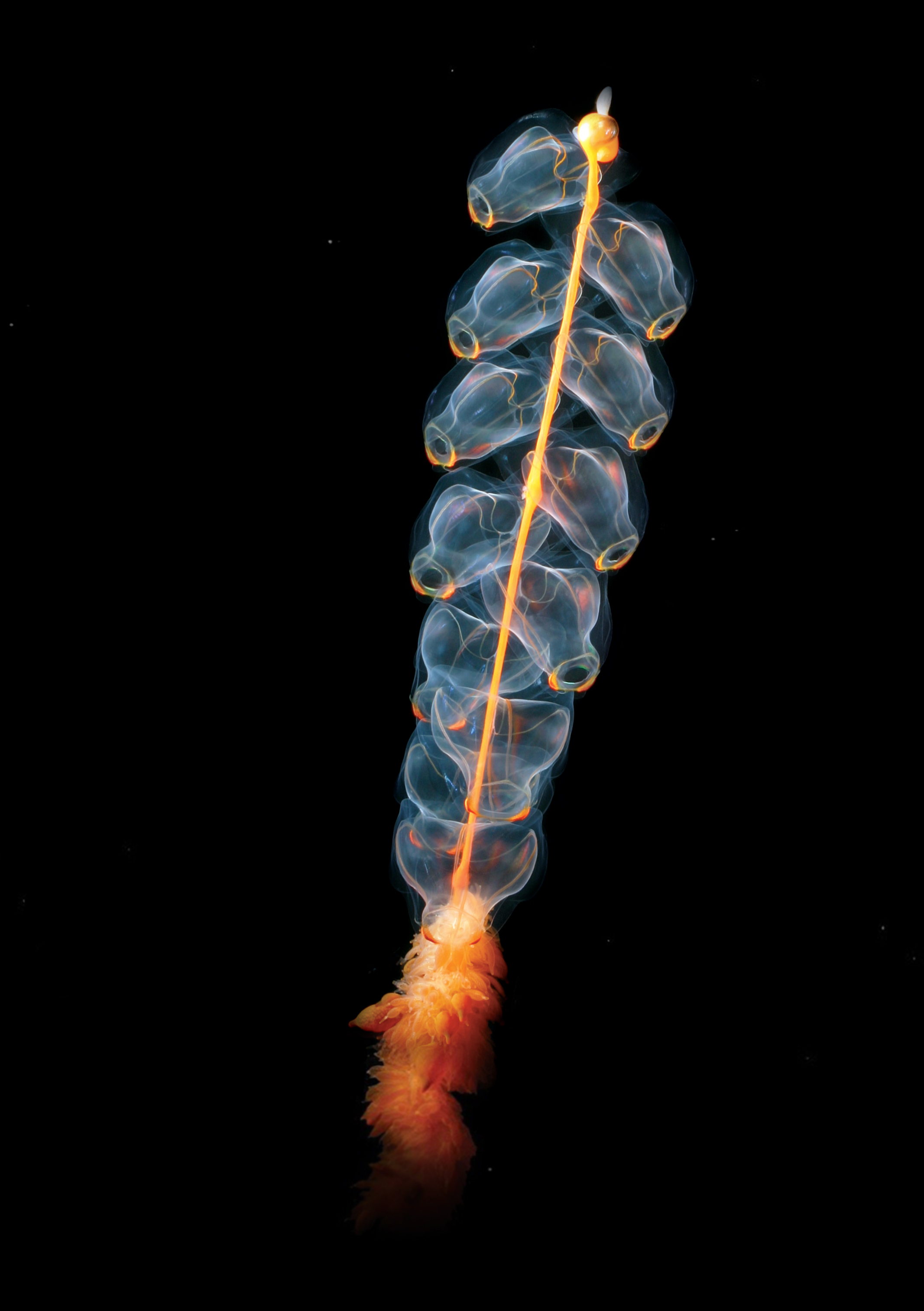
Marrus orthocanna; Agalmatidae

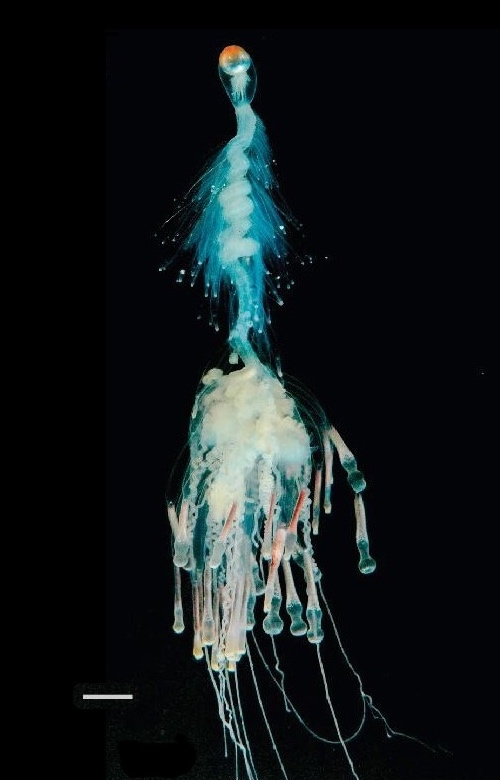
Bathyphysa conifera (Rhizophysidae), commonly known as the "flying spaghetti monster"

Jellyfish (Scyphozoa)

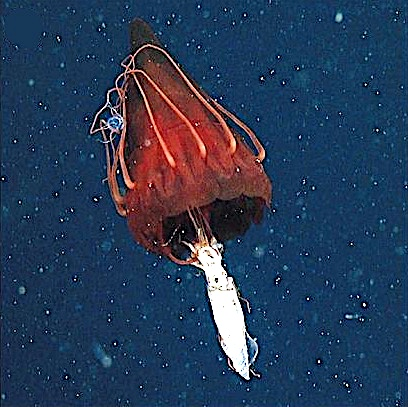
Helmet jellyfish (Periphyllidae) feeding on an armhook squid

Stygiomedusa gigantea (Ulmaridae) the giant phantom jellyfish

Narcomedusae; Hydrozoa

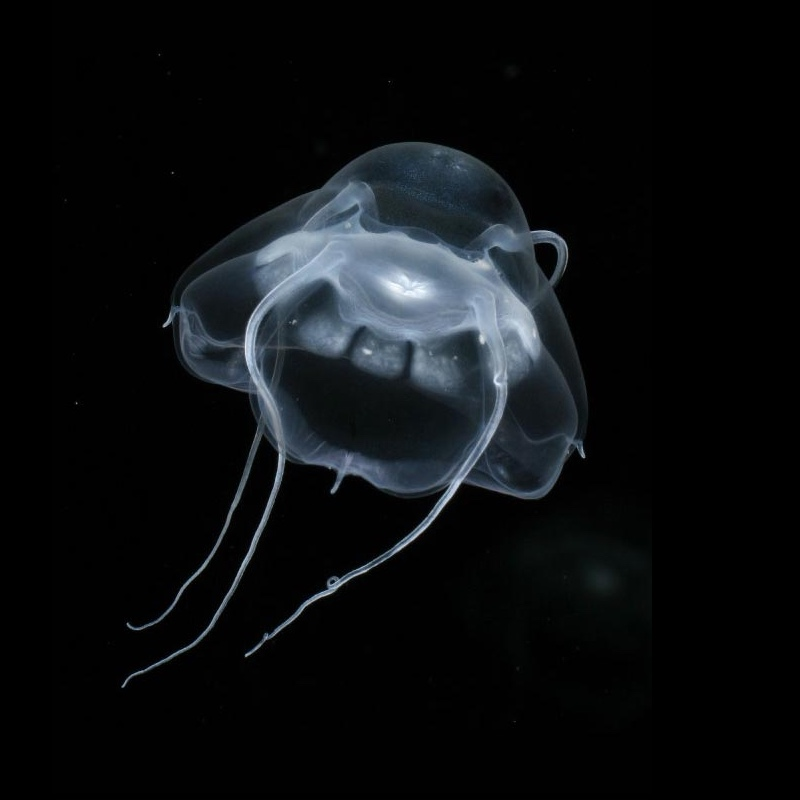
Bathykorus bouilloni; Aeginidae

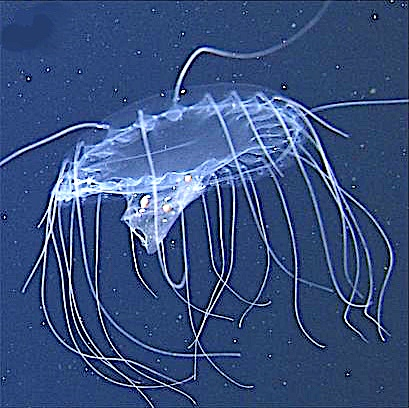
Solmissus sp. (Cuninidae) ingesting a chain of salps

== Jelly pump ==
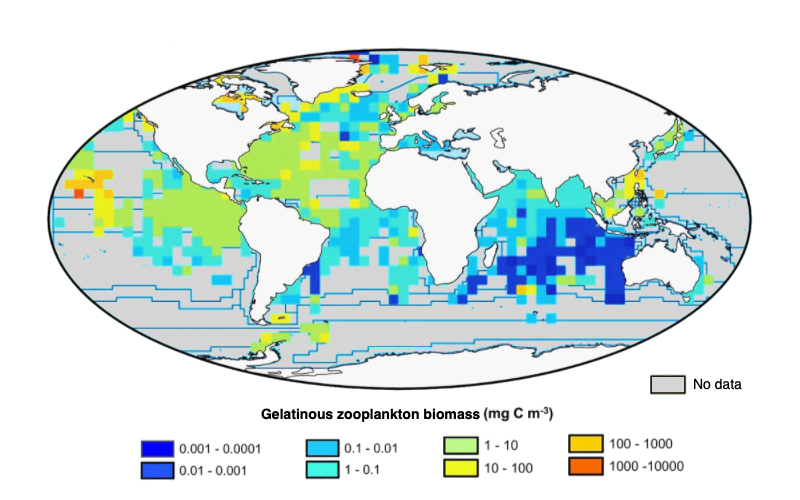
Global summary of gelatinous biomass Upper ocean (200 m) depth‐integrated global gelatinous zooplankton biomass on 5° grid cells displayed over the Longhurst Provinces modelled.

Biological oceanic processes, primarily carbon production in the euphotic zone, sinking and remineralization, govern the global biological carbon soft‐tissue pump. Sinking and laterally transported carbon‐laden particles fuel benthic ecosystems at continental margins and in the deep sea. Marine zooplankton play a major role as ecosystem engineers in coastal and open ocean ecosystems because they serve as links between primary production, higher trophic levels, and deep‐sea communities. In particular, gelatinous zooplankton (Cnidaria, Ctenophora, and Chordata, namely, Thaliacea) are universal members of plankton communities that graze on phytoplankton and prey on other zooplankton and ichthyoplankton. They also can rapidly reproduce on a time scale of days and, under favorable environmental conditions, some species form dense blooms that extend for many square kilometers. These blooms have negative ecological and socioeconomic impacts by reducing commercially harvested fish species, limiting carbon transfer to other trophic levels, enhancing microbial remineralization, and thereby driving oxygen concentrations down close to anoxic levels.

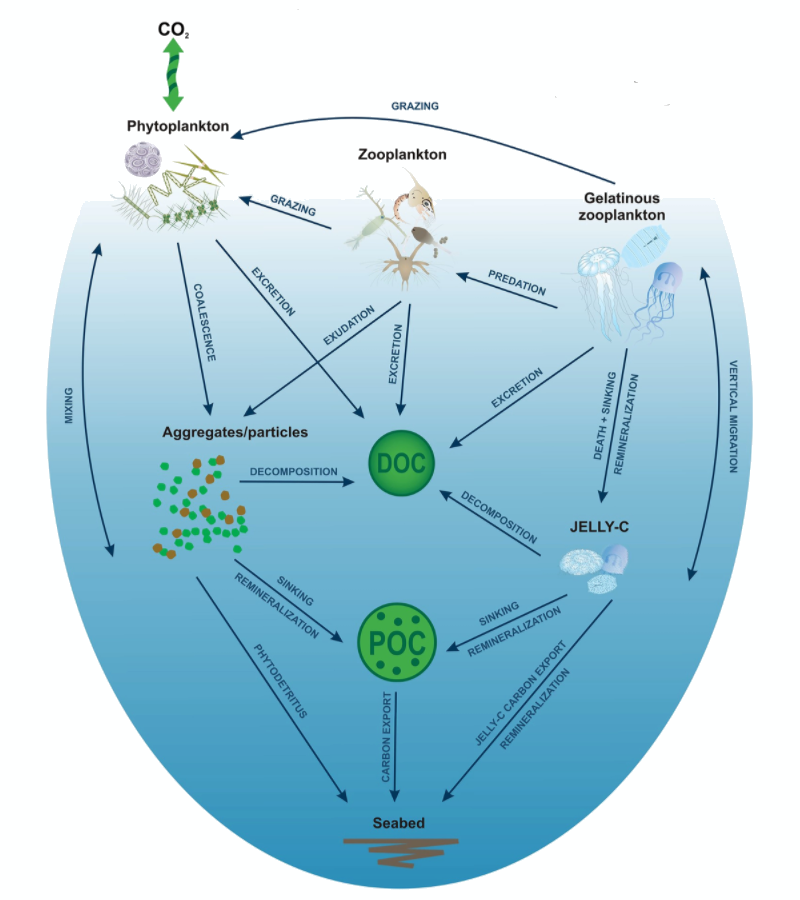
Gelatinous zooplankton biological pump How jelly carbon fits in the biological pump. A schematic representation of the biological pump and the biogeochemical processes that remove elements from the surface ocean by sinking biogenic particles including jelly carbon.

=== Jelly carbon ===
The global biomass of gelatinous zooplankton (sometimes referred to as jelly‐C) within the upper 200 m of the ocean amounts to 0.038 Pg C. Calculations for mesozooplankton (200 μm to 2 cm) suggest about 0.20 Pg C. The short life span of most gelatinous zooplankton, from weeks up to 2 to 12 months, suggests biomass‐production rates above 0.038 Pg C year^{−1}, depending on the assumed mortality rates, which in many cases are species‐specific. This is much smaller than global primary production (50 Pg C year^{−1}), which translates into export estimates close to 6 Pg C year^{−1} below 100 m, depending on the method used. Globally, gelatinous zooplankton abundance and distribution patterns largely follow those of temperature and dissolved oxygen as well as primary production as the carbon source. However, gelatinous zooplankton cope with a wide spectrum of environmental conditions, indicating the ability to adapt and occupy most available ecological niches in a water mass. In terms of Longhurst regions (biogeographical provinces that partition the pelagic environment, the highest densities of gelatinous zooplankton occur in coastal waters of the Humboldt Current, NE U.S. Shelf, Scotian and Newfoundland shelves, Benguela Current, East China and Yellow Seas, followed by polar regions of the East Bering and Okhotsk Seas, the Southern Ocean, enclosed bodies of water such as the Black Sea and the Mediterranean, and the west Pacific waters of the Japan seas and the Kuroshio Current. Large amounts of jelly carbon biomass that are reported from coastal areas of open shelves and semi-enclosed seas of North America, Europe, and East Asia come from coastal stranding data.

=== Carbon export ===
Large amounts of jelly carbon are quickly transferred to and remineralized on the seabed in coastal areas, including estuaries, lagoons and subtidal/intertidal zones, shelves and slopes, the deepsea. and even entire continental margins such as in the Mediterranean Sea. Jelly carbon transfer begins when gelatinous zooplankton die at a given "death depth" (exit depth), continues as biomass sinks through the water column, and terminates once biomass is remineralized during sinking or reaches the seabed, and then decays. Jelly carbon per se represents a transfer of "already exported" particles (below the mixed later, euphotic or mesopelagic zone), originated in primary production since gelatinous zooplankton "repackage" and integrate this carbon in their bodies, and after death transfer it to the ocean's interior. While sinking through the water column, jelly carbon is partially or totally remineralized as dissolved organic/inorganic carbon and nutrients (DOC, DIC, DON, DOP, DIN and DIP) and any left overs further experience microbial decomposition or are scavenged by macrofauna and megafauna once on the seabed. Despite the high lability of jelly‐C, a remarkably large amount of biomass arrives at the seabed below 1,000 m. During sinking, jelly‐C biochemical composition changes via shifts in C:N:P ratios as observed in experimental studies. Yet realistic jelly‐C transfer estimates at the global scale remain in their infancy, preventing a quantitative assessment of the contribution to the biological carbon soft‐tissue pump.

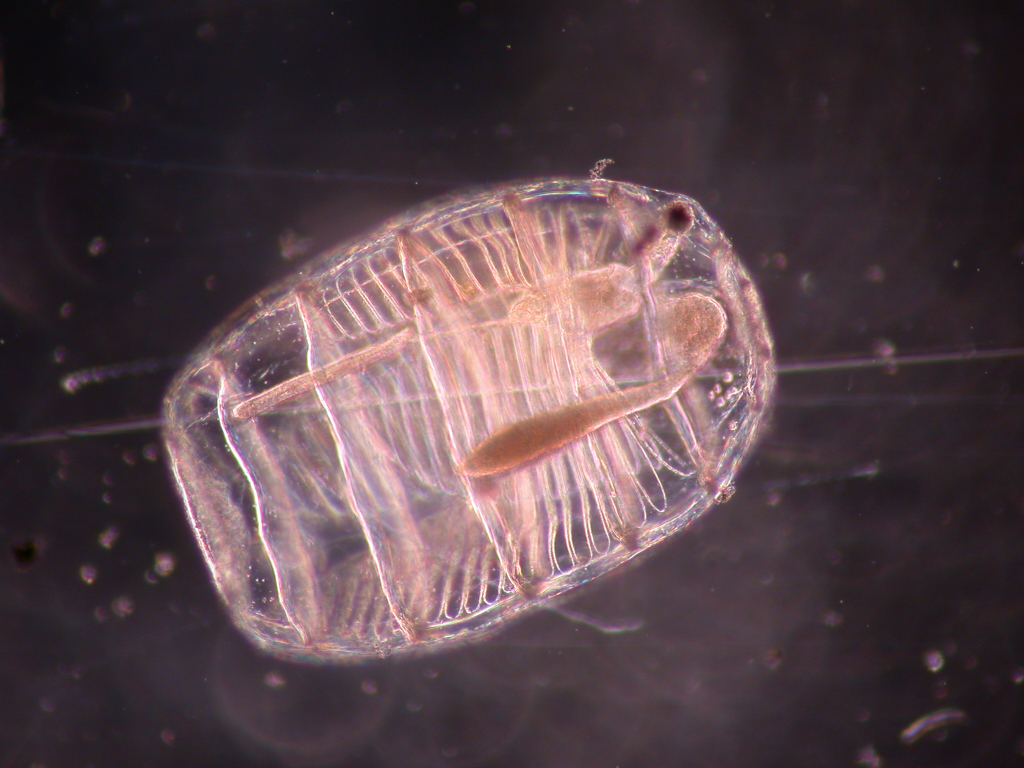
Doliolids, gelatinous tunicates belonging to the class of Thaliaceans, are found everywhere on continental shelves. Thaliaceans play an important role in the ecology of the sea. Their dense faecal pellets sink to the bottom of the oceans and this may be a major part of the worldwide carbon cycle.

Ocean carbon export is typically estimated from the flux of sinking particles that are either caught in sediment traps or quantified from videography, and subsequently modeled using sinking rates. Biogeochemical models are normally parameterized using particulate organic matter data (e.g., 0.5–1,000 μm marine snow and fecal pellets) that were derived from laboratory experiments or from sediment trap data. These models do not include jelly‐C (except larvaceans, not only because this carbon transport mechanism is considered transient/episodic and not usually observed, and mass fluxes are too big to be collected by sediment traps, but also because models aim to simplify the biotic compartments to facilitate calculations. Furthermore, jelly‐C deposits tend not to build up at the seafloor over a long time, such as phytodetritus (Beaulieu, 2002), being consumed rapidly by demersal and benthic organisms or decomposed by microbes. The jelly‐C sinking rate is governed by organism size, diameter, biovolume, geometry, density, and drag coefficients. In 2013, Lebrato et al. determined the average sinking speed of jelly‐C using Cnidaria, Ctenophora, and Thaliacea samples, which ranged from 800 to 1,500 m day−1 (salps: 800–1,200 m day−1; scyphozoans: 1,000–1,100 m d−1; ctenophores: 1,200–1,500 m day−1; pyrosomes: 1,300 m day−1). Jelly‐C model simulations suggest that, regardless of taxa, higher latitudes are more efficient corridors to transfer jelly‐C to the seabed owing to lower remineralization rates. In subtropical and temperate regions, significant decomposition takes place in the water column above 1,500 m depth, except in cases where jelly‐C starts sinking below the thermocline. In shallow‐water coastal regions, time is a limiting factor, which prevents remineralization while sinking and results in the accumulation of decomposing jelly‐C from a variety of taxa on the seabed. This suggests that gelatinous zooplankton transfer most biomass and carbon to the deep ocean, enhancing coastal carbon fluxes via DOC and DIC, fueling microbial and megafaunal/macrofaunal scavenging communities. However, the absence of satellite‐derived jelly‐C measurements (such as primary production) and the limited number of global zooplankton biomass data sets make it challenging to quantify global jelly‐C production and transfer efficiency to the ocean's interior.

== Monitoring ==
Because of its fragile structure, image acquisition of gelatinous zooplankton requires the assistance of computer visioning. Automated recognition of zooplankton in sample deposits is possible by utilising technologies such as Tikhonov regularization, support vector machines and genetic programming.

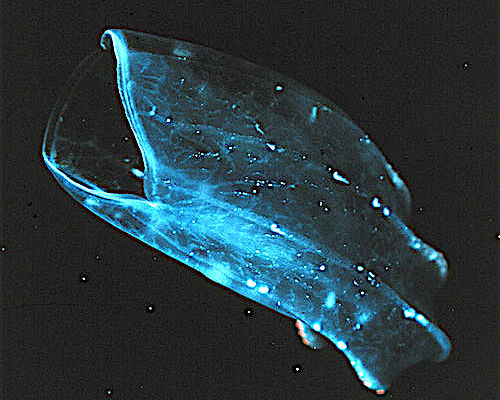
The Beroe ctenophore, mouth gaping, preys on other ctenophores

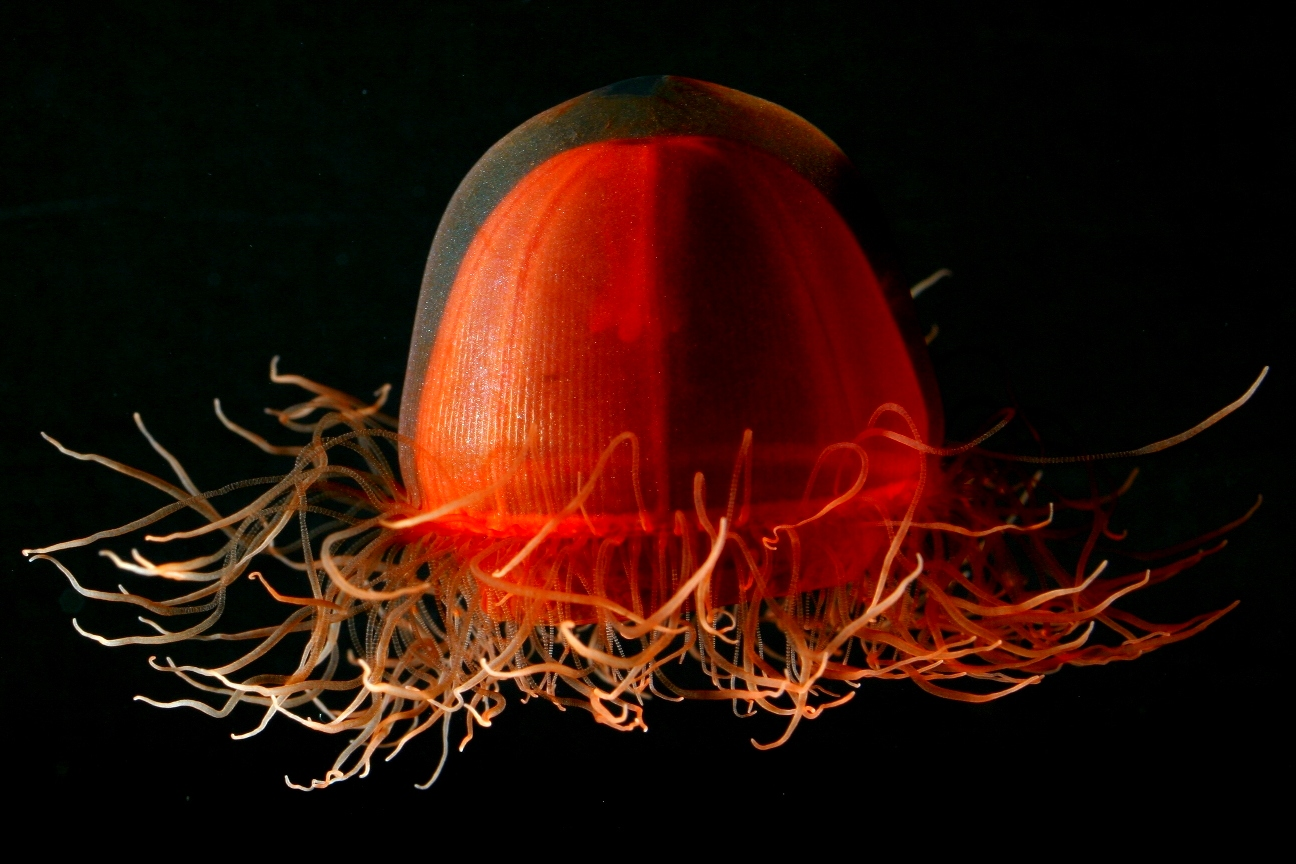
Deep-red jellyfish, a hydrozoan found in the Arctic Ocean at depths below 1,000 m (3,300 ft).

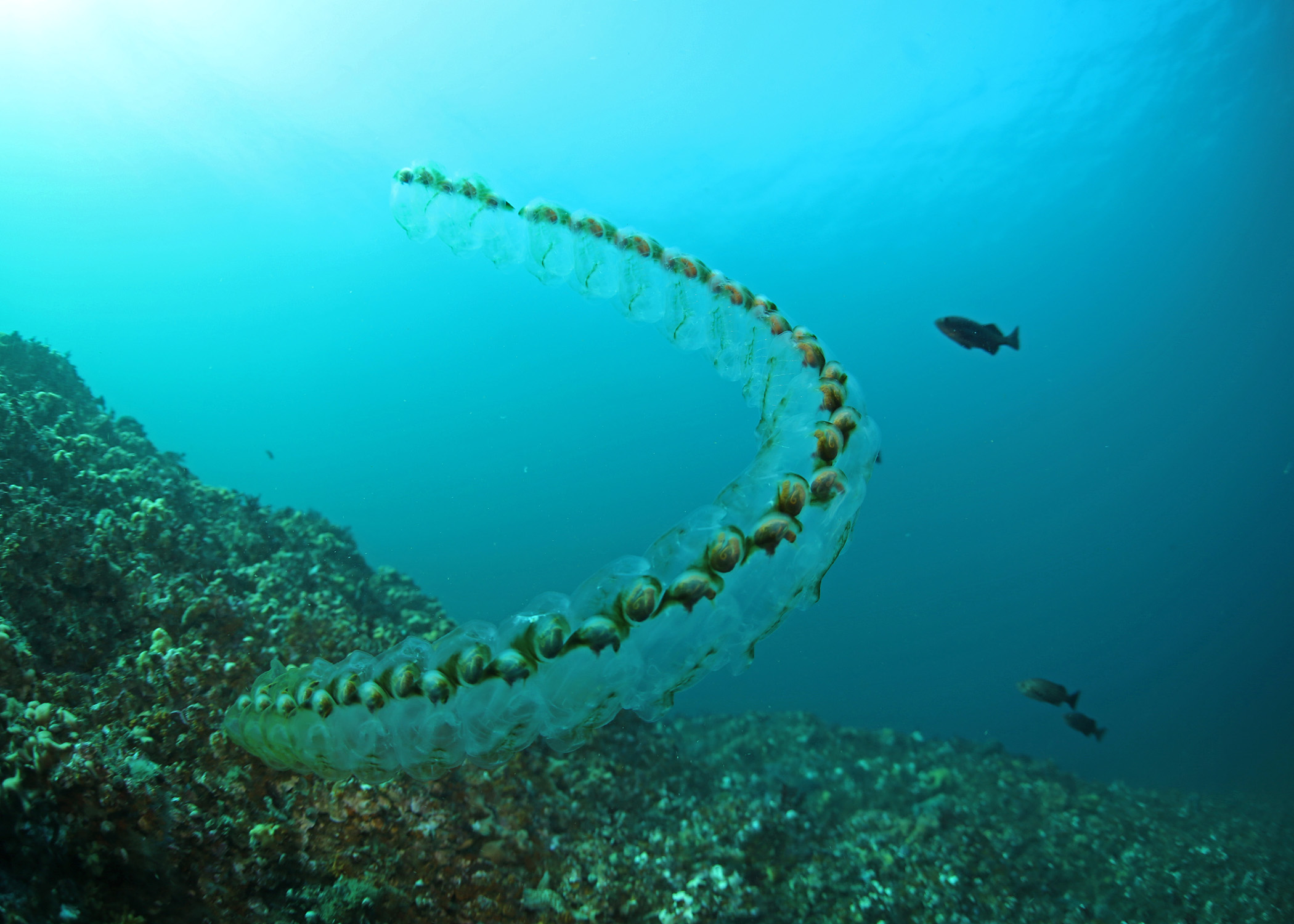
The salp, another example of a gelatinous tunicate, is often found in the form of a colonial chain

== See also ==
- Sea snot
