= Aegina rosea =

Scientific classification
- Kingdom: Animalia
- Phylum: Cnidaria
- Class: Hydrozoa
- Order: Narcomedusae
- Family: Aeginidae
- Genus: Aegina
- Species: A. rosea

Binomial name
- Aegina rosea Eschscholtz, 1829

Species of hydrozoan

Aegina rosea is a species of hydrozoan of the family Aeginidae. It is one of two species in the genus Aegina, which was believed to be monotypic, until molecular phylogenetic analysis revealed that Aegina rosea was a second species.

== Description ==
Aegina rosea is circular with a large stomach, two rectangular stomach pouches. It has jagged margins between each of its tentacles, of which there are 5 or 6. The tentacles have nematocysts and are capable of clasping. Its stomach and stomach pouches are magenta, while the tentacles are yellow. It was originally found in the Pacific Northwest and has since been found in the Central Pacific Basin. Its maximum size is believed to be at least 32 millimeters in diameter.
