= Aeginopsis =

Scientific classification
- Kingdom: Animalia
- Phylum: Cnidaria
- Class: Hydrozoa
- Order: Narcomedusae
- Family: Solmundaeginidae
- Genus: Aeginopsis; Brandt, 1835
- Species: A. laurentii

Binomial name
- Aeginopsis laurentii Brandt, 1838

Synonyms
- Aeginopsis horensis Brandt, 1835; Aeginopsis mertensii Haeckel, 1879; Solmundus glacialis Grönberg, 1898

Genus of hydrozoans

Aeginopsis is a genus of deep sea hydrozoan of the family Aeginidae. It is monotypic, with the single species Aeginopsis laurentii.

== Habitat ==
Found in arctic and sub-arctic waters, and is usually found on shelves, less commonly in offshore waters, but no deeper then 500 m.
