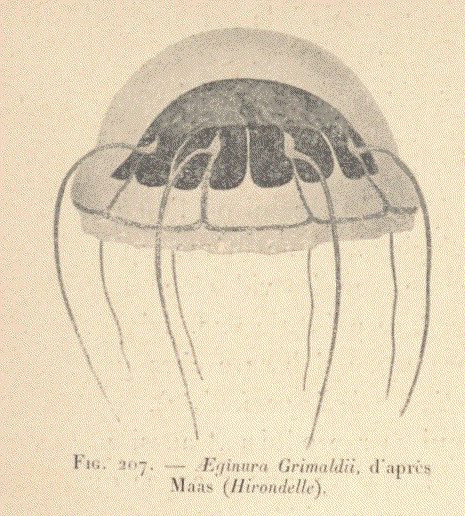
- illustration

Scientific classification
- Kingdom: Animalia
- Phylum: Cnidaria
- Class: Hydrozoa
- Order: Narcomedusae
- Family: Aeginidae
- Genus: Aeginura
- Species: A. grimaldii

Binomial name
- Aeginura grimaldii Maas, 1904

Synonyms
- Aegina grimaldii (Maas, 1904) (incorrect combination); Aeginura incisa Mayer, 1910 (possible synonym); Aeginura weberi Maas, 1905; Cunoctona grimaldii (Maas, 1904); Cunoctona grimaldii var. munda Vanhöffen, 1908; Cunoctona guinensis Vanhöffen, 1908; Cunoctona obscura Vanhöffen, 1908

= Aeginura grimaldii =

Species of hydrozoan

Aeginura grimaldii is a species of deep sea hydrozoan of the family Aeginidae. It is found in the north-eastern Atlantic Ocean, Pacific Ocean, and the Arctic Ocean. It has a depth range of 660-1200 m deep. Live specimens are bright reddish in color, with pale tentacles, and a light red globous capsule dome containing the dark colored red body. It usually measures no more than 4.5 cm from the peak of the bell to the end of the tentacles.
