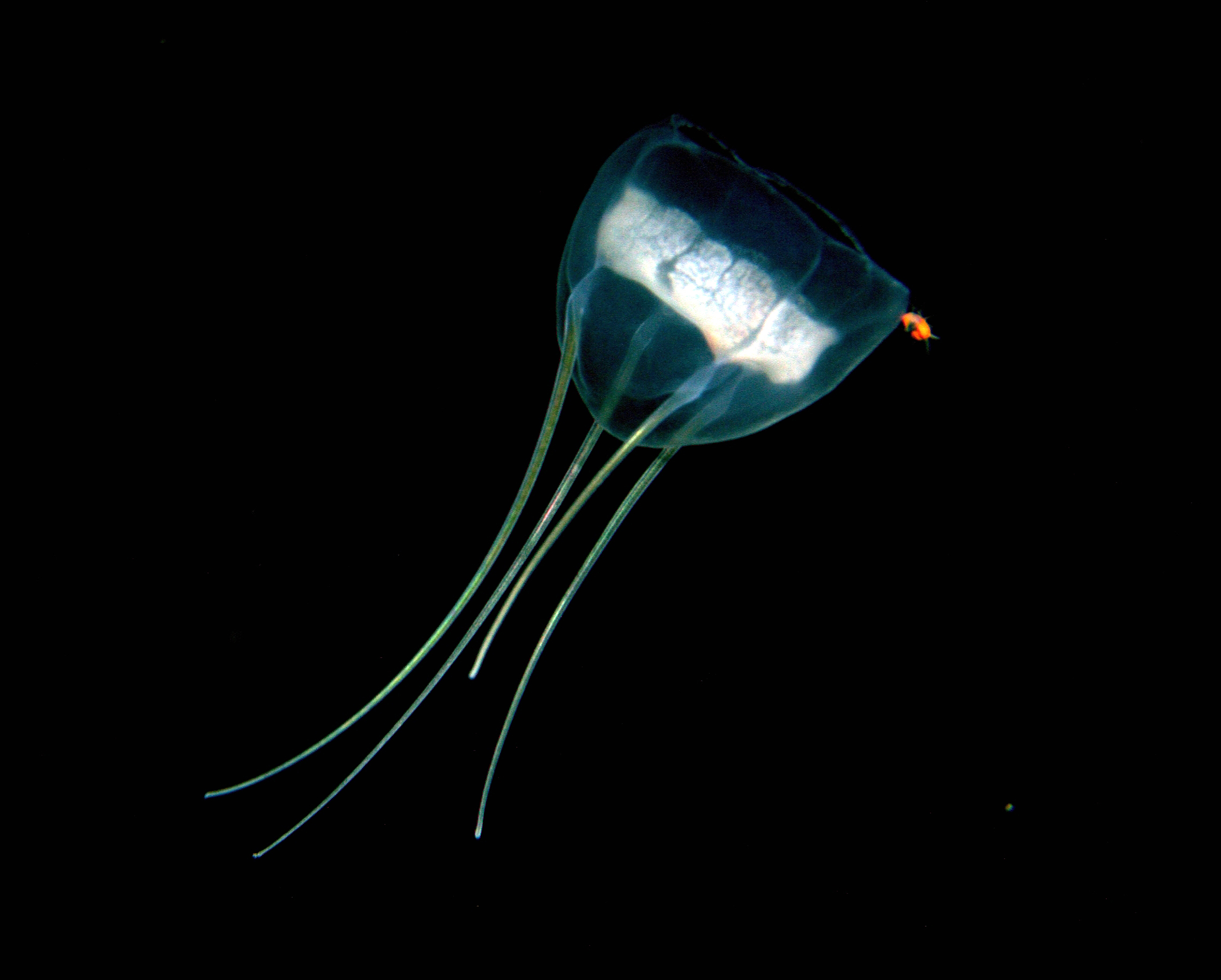

Scientific classification
- Kingdom: Animalia
- Phylum: Cnidaria
- Class: Hydrozoa
- Order: Narcomedusae
- Family: Aeginidae
- Genus: Aegina
- Species: A. citrea

Binomial name
- Aegina citrea Eschscholtz, 1829

Synonyms
- Aegina alternans Bigelow, 1909; Aegina eschscholtzii Haeckel, 1879; Aegina lactea Vanhöffen, 1908; Cunarcha aeginoides Haeckel, 1879

= Aegina citrea =

Species of hydrozoan

Aegina citrea, or lemon jelly, is a species of deep sea hydrozoan of the family Aeginidae.
