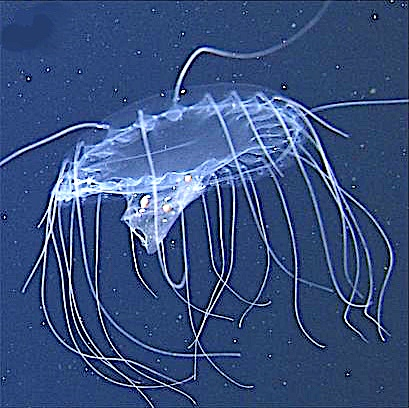

Conservation status
- Data Deficient (IUCN 3.1)

Scientific classification
- Kingdom: Animalia
- Phylum: Cnidaria
- Class: Hydrozoa
- Order: Narcomedusae
- Family: Cuninidae
- Genus: Solmissus
- Species: S. incisa

Binomial name
- Solmissus incisa (Fewkes, 1886)

= Solmissus incisa =

Species of jellyfish

Solmissus incisa, also commonly known as the dinner plate jelly, is a species of narcomedusa in the family Solmissidae. The Solmissus incisa is a transparent, bioluminescent, deep sea jellyfish that is found in the mesopelagic zone of the Atlantic and Pacific oceans. This species is known for its flattened bell (the umbrella), long trailing tentacles, unusual life history, and predatory behavior. Solmissus incisa was originally thought to be a single species found worldwide; however, recent studies suggest that it may consist of several closely related species but with different forms and distributions.

Solmissus incisa is a species of deep-sea jellyfish in the family Solmissus. The species is distributed worldwide, but is largely concentrated in the Gulf of Mexico.

== Etymology and common name ==
The common name “dinner plate jelly” refers to the broad, flattened shape of their bell, which resembles a dinner plate when viewed from above.

The scientific name incisa comes from the Latin word “cut” or “notched”, which likely refers to the incised or small indentations around the edge of the bell.

== Description ==
This Solmissus incisa is a transparent narcomedusa with a broad, flattened umbrella with numerous long, thin tentacles. The bell of the jelly is usually circular and flattened hence the plate-like appearance. This species is almost colorless; however, the stomach and reproductive tissues may appear pale white. Depending on the individual, they may have 22 to 24 tentacles. The difference in tentacle number comes from differences in the manubrial pouches, these are sac-like lobes around the stomach and mouth in the center of the bell. These differences suggest that it is not just variation within one species but could be different cryptic species. The S. incisa swims by contractions of the bell and captures prey with their long tentacles that have nematocysts, the specialized cells in the tentacles that are barbed and/or contain venom that help capture prey or for self defense.

== Taxonomy and phylogeny ==
S. incisa belongs to the order Narcomedusae, they are a group of Hydrozoans that spend their entire life suspended in the water column. Narcomedusae are different from many other hydrozoans because they generally do not have a benthic polyp stage. Recent molecular studies suggest that not all populations of S.incisa belong to the same species. Recent studies have shown that Solmissus incisa can vary from ocean to ocean, in both appearance and genetics, suggesting the species may actually be a part of a group of several closely related species rather than being a single worldwide species.

== Evolution ==
Solmissus incisa is a part of the Narcomedusae order, they are considered evolutionarily unusual among the other hydrozoans because they usually do not go through the benthic polyp stage, but remain in their planktonic state throughout their entire life. This skipped stage is thought to have allowed the S. incisa to have a specialized life in the deep pelagic environment, as suitable surfaces for benthic stages are rare to come by.

== Life cycle and reproduction ==
Solmissus incisa do not have a benthic polyp stage, unlike many other hydrozoans. Observations from the western North Atlantic indicate that the species go directly from the larval stage into a juvenile medusa.

The Solmissus incisa likely reproduces sexually, broadcast spawning, releasing their eggs and sperm into the water around them. After fertilization, the embryo develops into an actinula larva and then goes straight into a small juvenile medusa. Juveniles only have a few tentacles at first but gradually acquire more as they grow.

It has been observed that Narcomedusae may also have unusually complex developmental stages. Small cnidarian shaped structures have been seen attached to the bell of an adult Solmissus incisa. These structures were developed within the epidermis, the thin outer layer of the jellyfish's body, of the medusa and were able to extend and retract their tentacles. However, researchers were unable to tell if they were true parasites or brooded offspring.

== Size ==
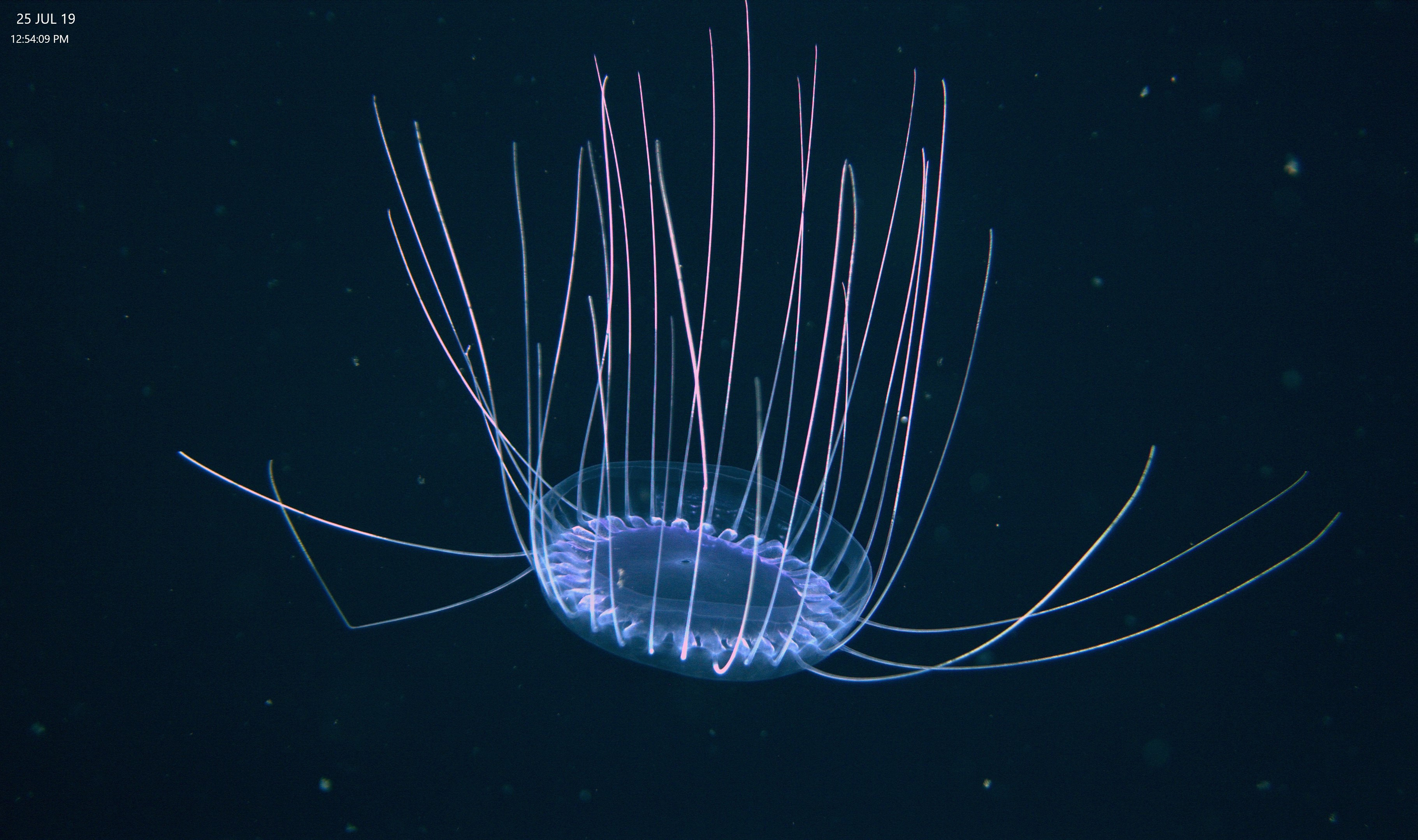
Figure 1: Deep sea observation of Solmissus incisa showing its flattened bell, transparent body, and long trailing tentacles that are used to capture prey.

The bell of the Solmissus incisa is generally several centimeters across; however, some large individuals can exceed 10 cm in diameter. Their tentacles are much longer than the bell and may trail several times farther than the width of the jellies body. If the tentacles are not trailing behind the jelly they are up in front in order to better capture prey.

== Habitat and distribution ==
Solmissus incisa are a mesopelagic species that are primarily found between 300 and 700 meters deep, some records range from near the surface to more than 1000 meters deep. Most records occur between 300-500m and 600-700m. Records are mainly concentrated in the North Pacific, North Atlantic, Gulf of Mexico, and temperate / tropical Pacific regions. Most observations are also recorded with temperatures between 11 and 12 celsius and salinities between 34 and 35 PSU.

== Diet ==
Solmissus incisa is an active predator that feeds majority on gelatinous zooplankton. The species is observed preying upon salps and other medusae, siphonophores, larvaceans, and other narcomedusae. S. incisa captures prey using its long tentacles and nematocysts. Once the prey is captured it is then transferred to the mouth by its tentacles and digested into the stomach. A specimen collected near the Kaikata Seamount off Japan at 573 meters deep contained a whole fish inside its stomach, this represents the first known record of a species within the Solmissus feeding on a fish, which suggests that S.incisa may consume larger prey than originally thought.

== Predators and prey ==
Solmissus incisa is a fearful predator, but it is likely preyed upon by larger deep sea fish, turtles, and gelatinous predators; however, specific predators have not been well documented yet. This species primarily preys upon gelatinous animals and other zooplankton. Recorded prey include salps, siphonophores, hydromedusae, and the occasional fish.

== Parasites ==
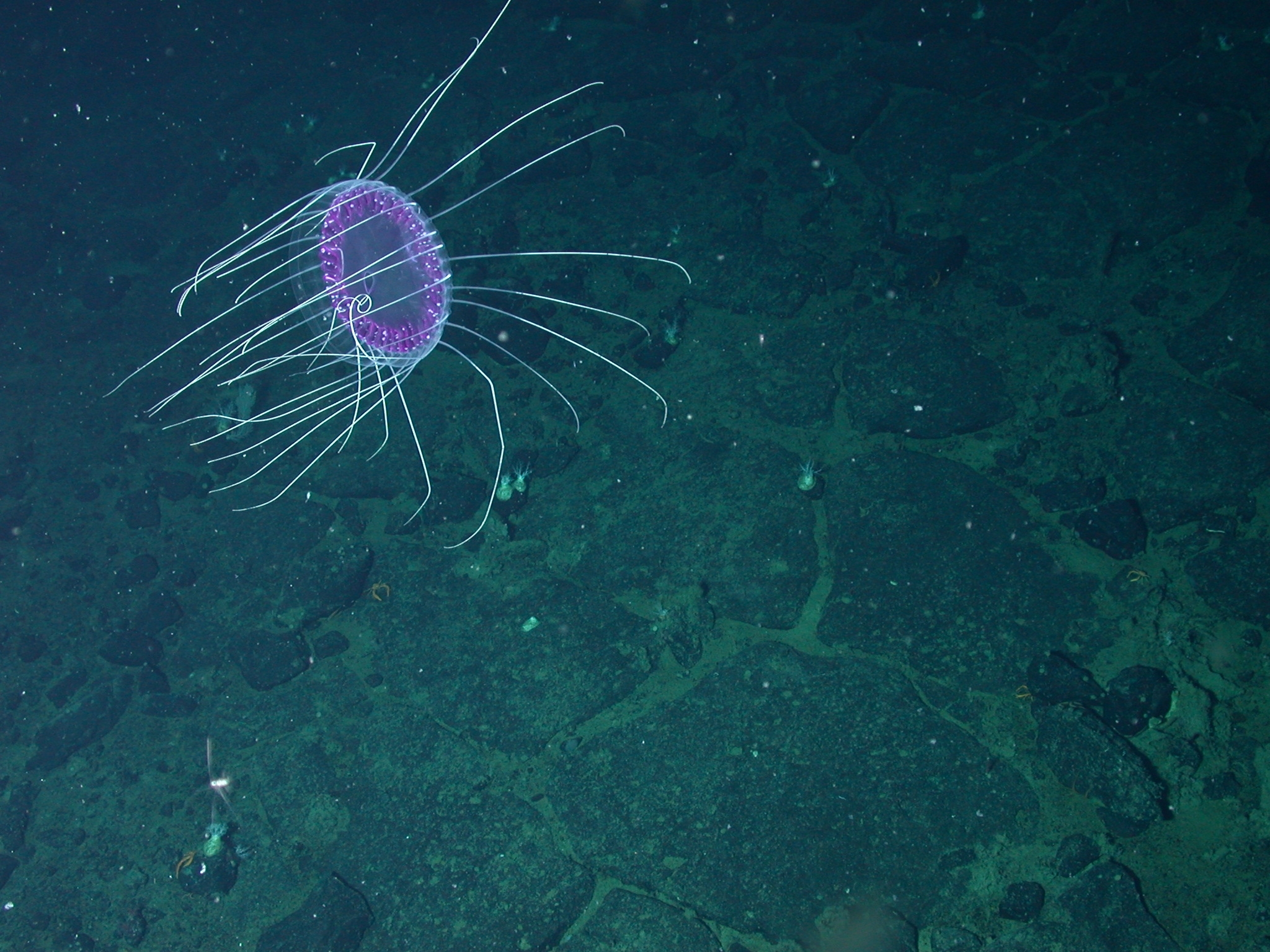
Figure 2: Solmissus incisa in the mesopelagic zone with tentacles extended, illustrating its role as an active predator of gelatinous animals.

Small opaque circular structures were observed attached to the bell of a Solmissus incisa. The structures were later found to be tiny cnidarian-like juveniles that were embedded in the epidermis of the medusa. The organism that was attached could extend and retract tentacles; however, the exact identification of the organism remains unknown. The organism could be a parasite feeding on the host or a young medusae being brooded by the adult.

== Ecology ==
Solmissus incisa are important predators in the deep sea food web. They feed on other zooplankton, which in return influences the movement of carbon and energy throughout the pelagic ecosystem. This species seems to be especially common in midwater habitats where other gelatinous organisms are commonly found and abundant. Seasonal observations records suggest that sightings are most frequent in the spring and some between March and May.
