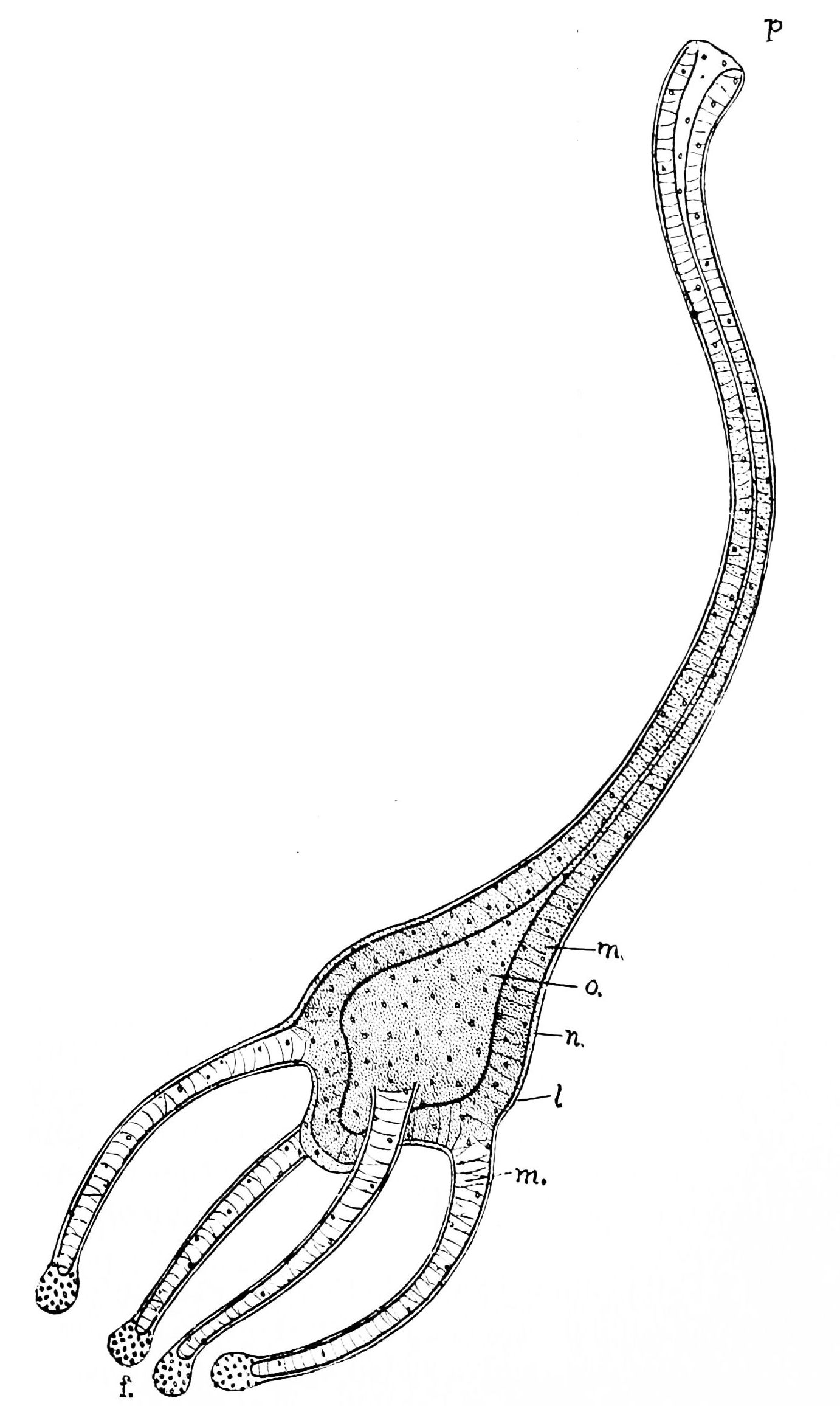
- Cunina octonaria hatched hydra

Scientific classification
- Kingdom: Animalia
- Phylum: Cnidaria
- Class: Hydrozoa
- Order: Narcomedusae
- Family: Cuninidae
- Genus: Cunina; Eschscholtz, 1829

Type species
- Cunina globosa Eschscholtz, 1829

Species
- See text

= Cunina (cnidarian) =

Genus of hydrozoans

Cunina is a genus of hydrozoan in the Cuninidae. The genus contains bioluminescent species.

== Species ==
The following species are recognized:

- Cunina becki Bouillon, 1985
- Cunina discoides Fewkes, 1881
- Cunina duplicata Maas, 1893
- Cunina fowleri (Browne, 1906)
- Cunina frugifera Kramp, 1948
- Cunina globosa Eschscholtz, 1829
- Cunina octonaria McCrady, 1857
- Cunina peregrina Bigelow, 1909
- Cunina proboscidea E. & L. Metschnikoff, 1871
- Cunina simplex Gili, Bouillon, Pagès, Palanques, Puig & Heussner, 1998
- Cunina tenella (Bigelow, 1909)
