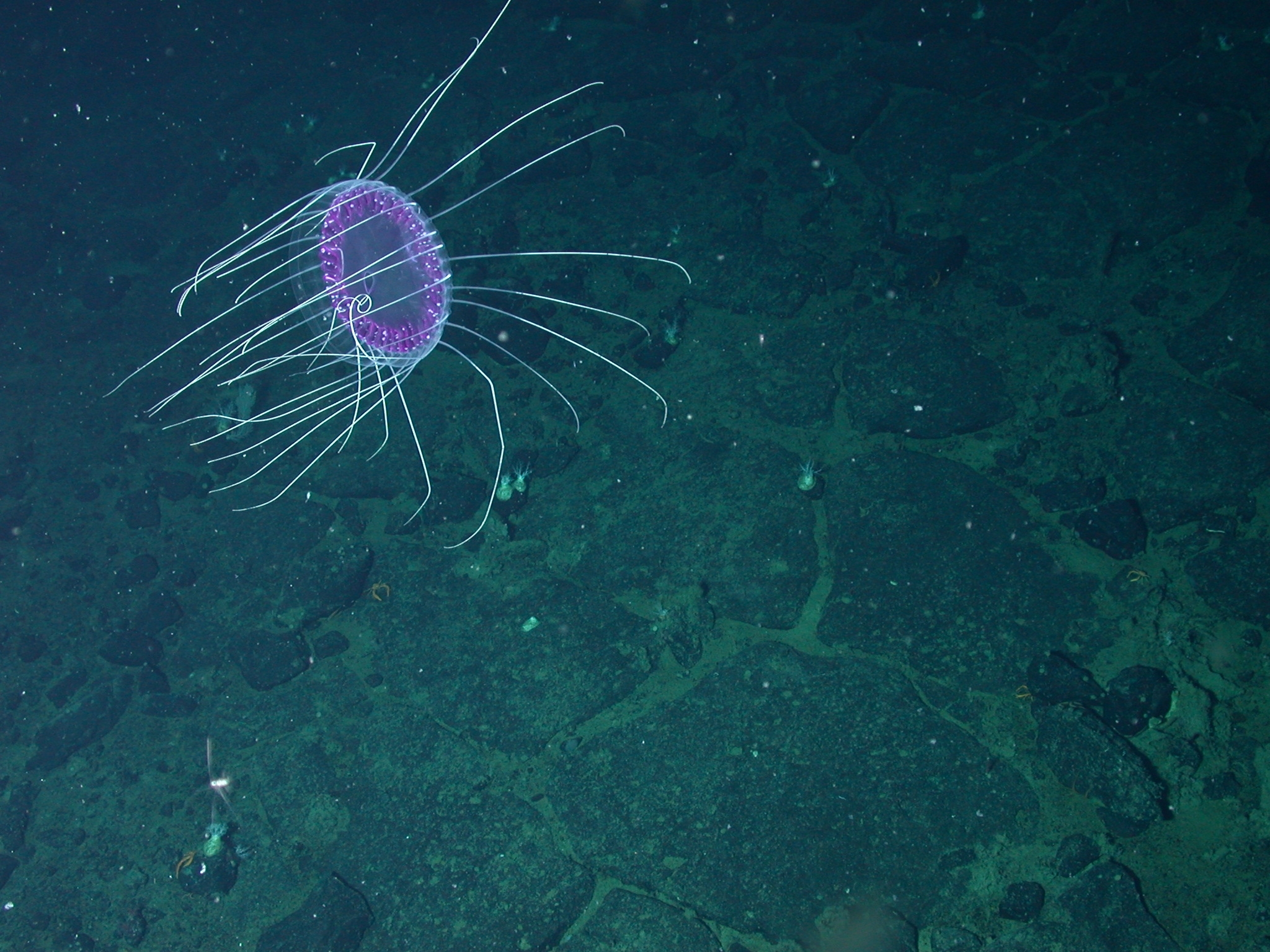

Conservation status
- Data Deficient (IUCN 3.1)

Scientific classification
- Kingdom: Animalia
- Phylum: Cnidaria
- Class: Hydrozoa
- Order: Narcomedusae
- Family: Cuninidae
- Genus: Solmissus
- Species: S. albescens

Binomial name
- Solmissus albescens (Gegenbaur, 1857)

= Solmissus albescens =

Species of jellyfish

Solmissus albescens is a species of jellyfish in the family Solmissus. The species has been observed in the Mediterranean Sea, off the coast of Morocco.
