= Aegina (disambiguation) =

Aegina is an island of Greece.

Aegina may also refer to:

- Aegina (cnidarian), a genus of hydrozoans
- Aegina (mythology), a nymph in Greek mythology
- Aegina, a character in the Khachaturian ballet Spartacus
- Aegina, a character in Shadow Labyrinth
- 91 Aegina, a large main belt asteroid

== See also ==
- Agena (disambiguation)
