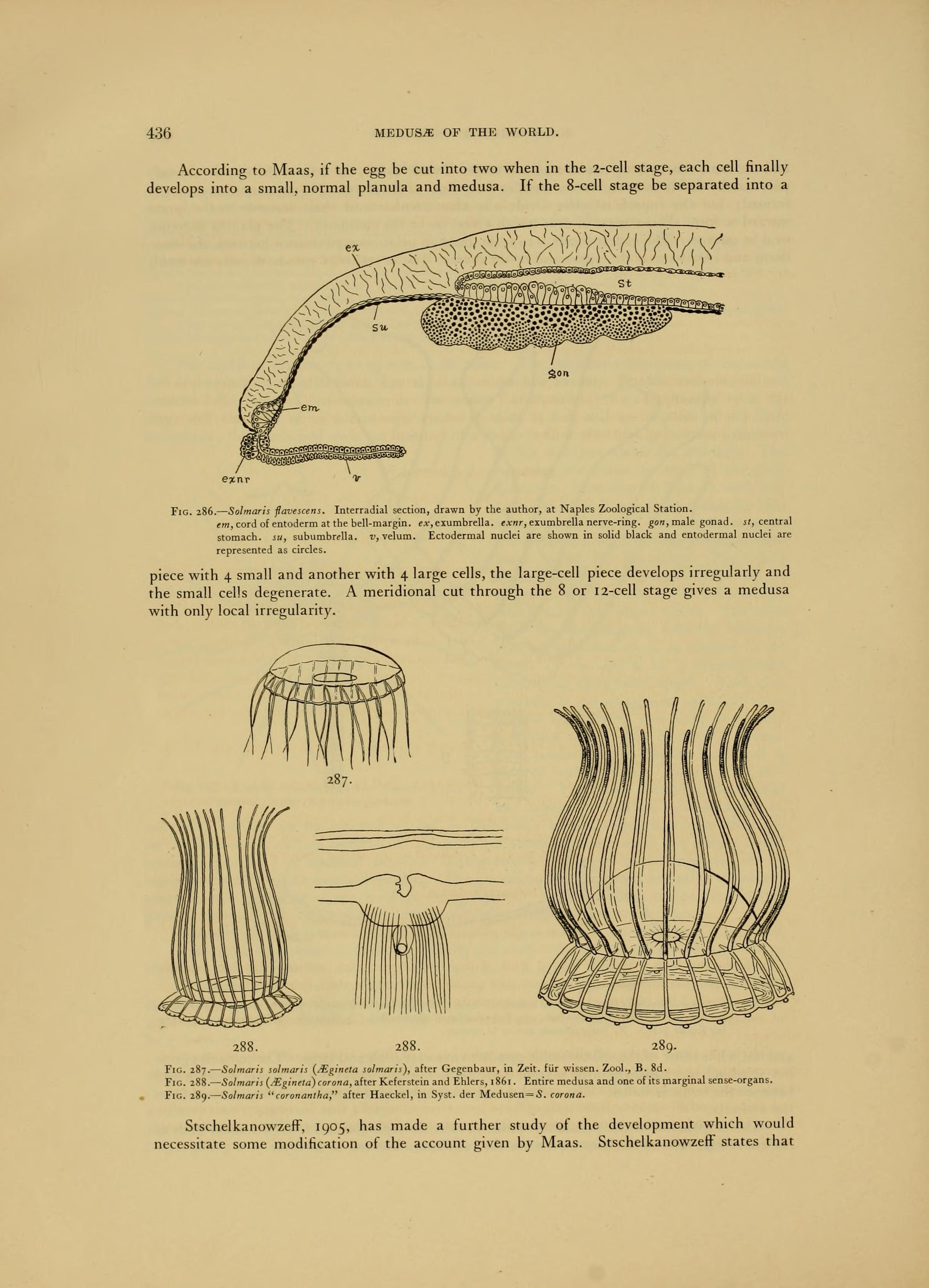
- Medusae of the world (1910)

Scientific classification
- Domain: Eukaryota
- Kingdom: Animalia
- Phylum: Cnidaria
- Class: Hydrozoa
- Order: Narcomedusae
- Family: Solmarisidae
- Genus: Solmaris; Haeckel, 1879

= Solmaris =

Genus of hydrozoans

Solmaris is a genus of diminutive hydrozoans.
