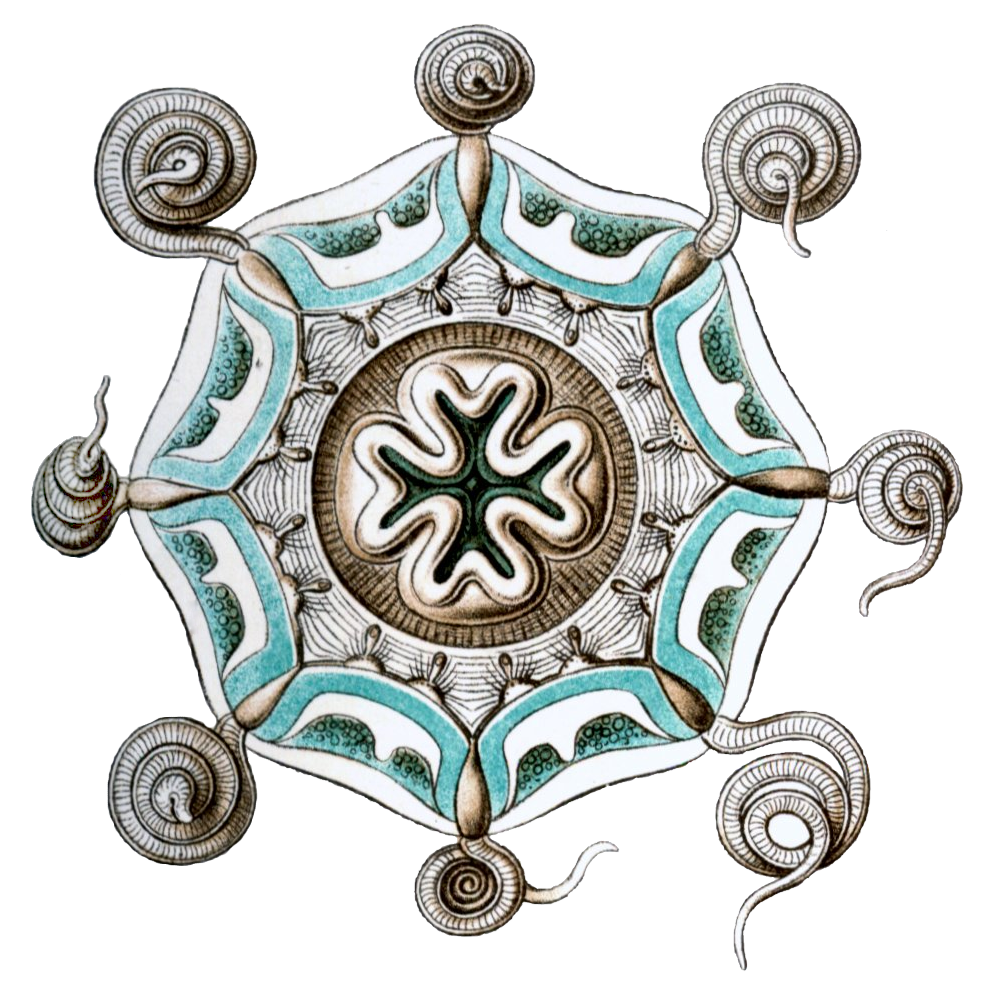

Scientific classification
- Domain: Eukaryota
- Kingdom: Animalia
- Phylum: Cnidaria
- Class: Hydrozoa
- Order: Narcomedusae
- Family: Aeginidae
- Genus: Aeginura; Haeckel, 1879

Synonyms
- Cunoctona Haeckel, 1879

= Aeginura =

Genus of hydrozoans

Aeginura is a genus of hydrozoans in the family Aeginidae.

== Species ==
There are two recognized species in the genus Aeginura:

- Aeginura beebei Bigelow, 1940
- Aeginura grimaldii Maas, 1904

=== Invalid species ===
- Aeginura lanzarotae (Haeckel, 1879) [taxon inquirendum]
- Aeginura myosura Haeckel, 1879 [taxon inquirendum]
- Aeginura nausithoe (Haeckel, 1879) [taxon inquirendum]
