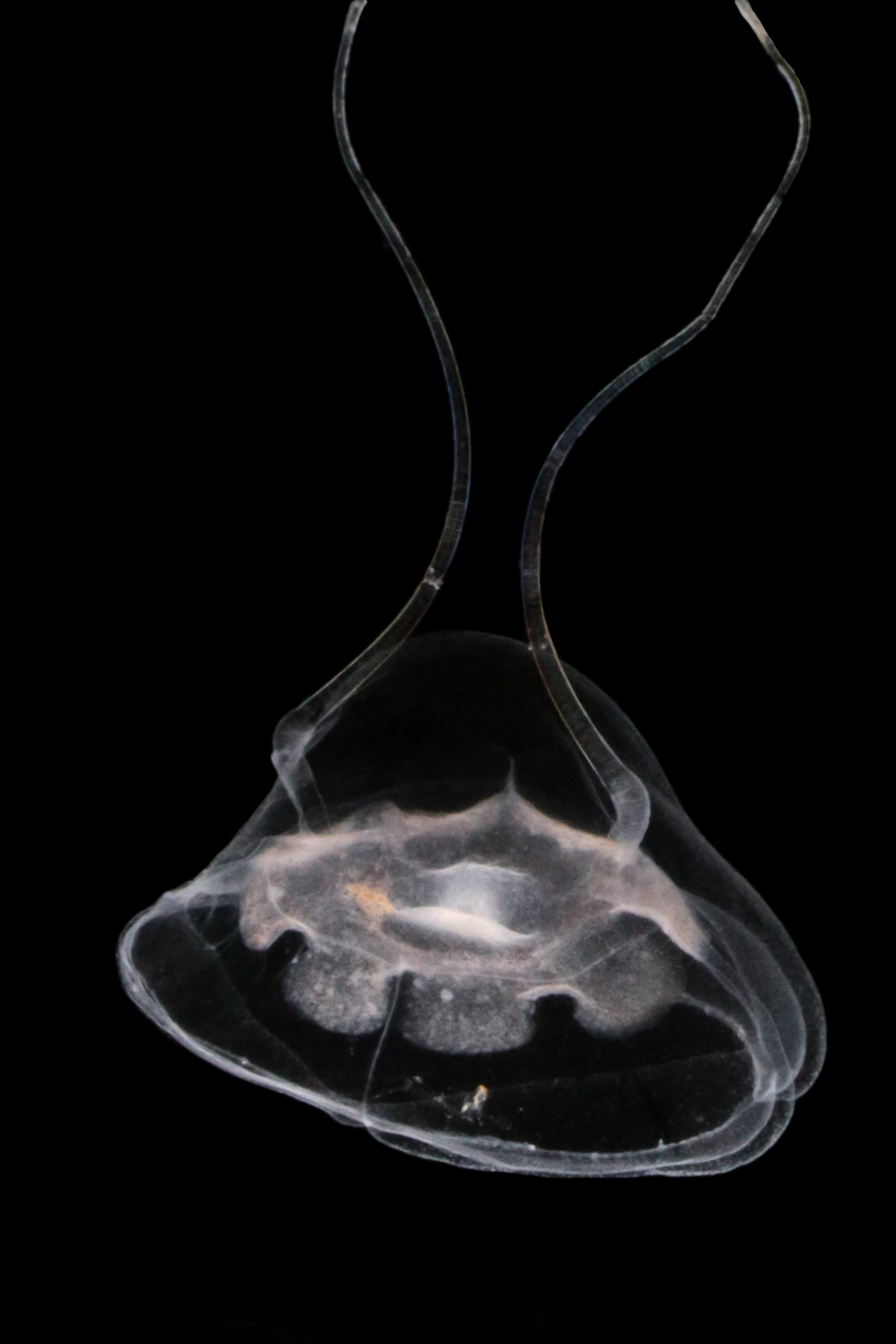
- Solmundella bitentaculata

Scientific classification
- Kingdom: Animalia
- Phylum: Cnidaria
- Class: Hydrozoa
- Order: Narcomedusae
- Family: Solmundaeginidae
- Genus: Solmundella; Haeckel, 1879
- Species: S. bitentaculata

Binomial name
- Solmundella bitentaculata (Quoy & Gaimard, 1833)

Synonyms
- (Genus): Aeginella Haeckel, 1879; (Species): Aeginella dissonema Haeckel, 1879; Aeginopsis mediterranea Müller, 1851; Carybdea bitentaculata Quoy & Gaimard, 1833; Solmundella muelleri Haeckel, 1879

= Solmundella =

Genus of hydrozoans

Solmundella is a genus of hydrozoan in the family Solmundaeginidae. It is monotypic, with the single species Solmundella bitentaculata.

== Distribution ==
This species is found in:

- Ross Sea, Antarctica.
- European waters
- Gulf of Mexico
- Kenya
- New Zealand
- North West Atlantic
- Mediterranean Sea

== Ecology ==
Solmundella bitentaculata is an epipelagic and mesopelagic species. It feeds on the gastropod Limacina antarctica.
