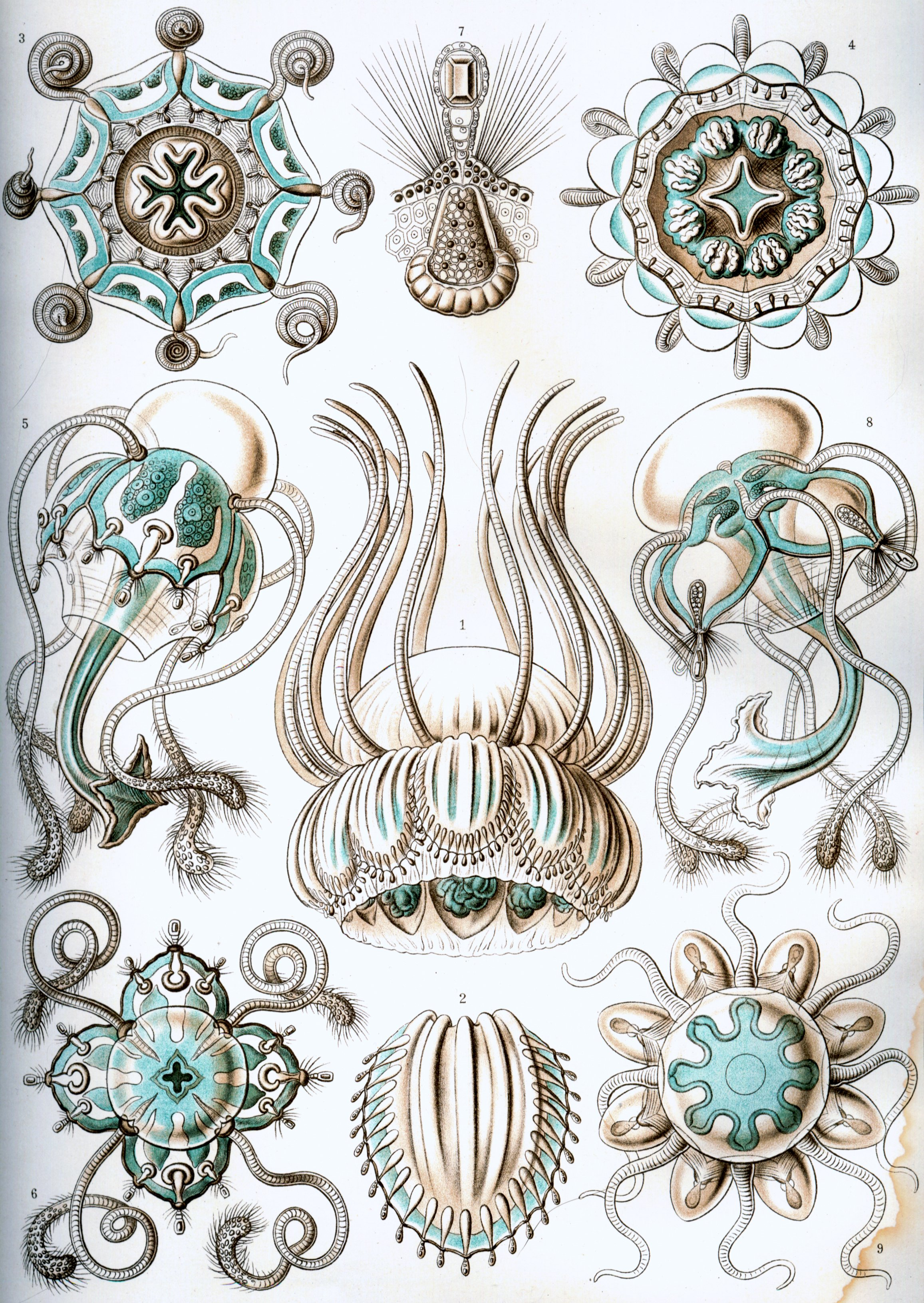
- (top right): Solmaris Godeffroyi (Haeckel) = Pegantha godeffroyi (Haeckel, 1879), bottom view

Scientific classification
- Kingdom: Animalia
- Phylum: Cnidaria
- Class: Hydrozoa
- Order: Narcomedusae
- Family: Solmarisidae; Haeckel, 1879

Genera
- Pegantha; Solmaris

= Solmarisidae =

Family of hydrozoans

Solmarisidae is a family of hydrozoans in the order Narcomedusae. The name is sometimes spelled "Solmaridae".

== Characteristics ==
Members of this family have dome-shaped bells and numerous tentacles set above the undulating margin of the bell. They do not have gastric pouches as do other members of the order. The gonads are situated inside the wall of the stomach.

== Genera and species ==
The World Register of Marine Species lists the following genera and species:

- Pegantha Haeckel, 1879
  - Pegantha clara Bigelow, 1909
  - Pegantha laevis H. B. Bigelow, 1909
  - Pegantha martagon Haeckel, 1879
  - Pegantha rubiginosa (Kölliker, 1853)
  - Pegantha triloba Haeckel, 1879
- Solmaris
  - Solmaris corona (Keferstein & Ehlers, 1861)
  - Solmaris flavescens (Kölliker, 1853)
  - Solmaris lenticula Haeckel, 1879
  - Solmaris leucostyla (Will, 1844)
  - Solmaris quadrata Bouillon, Boero & Seghers, 1991
  - Solmaris rhodoloma (Brandt, 1838)
  - Solmaris solmaris (Gegenbaur, 1856)
