= Agena =

Agena may refer to:

- Keiko Agena (1973), an American actress
- Beta Centauri, a star
- RM-81 Agena, a rocket upper stage family developed by Lockheed, especially the Agena target vehicle used in preparation for the Apollo program lunar missions
- AMD K10, a processor codenamed "Agena"

== See also ==
- Aegina (disambiguation)
