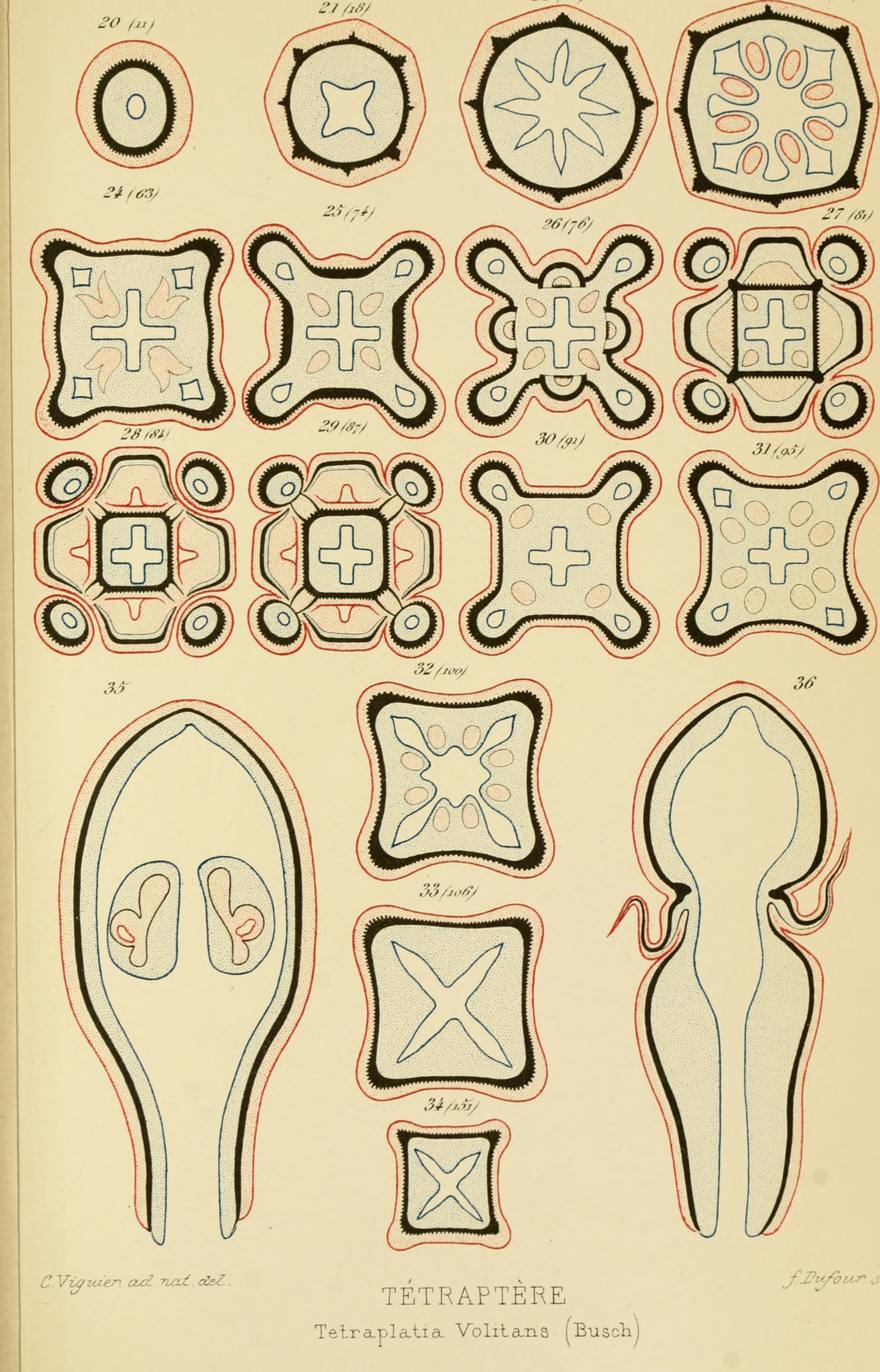

Scientific classification
- Kingdom: Animalia
- Phylum: Cnidaria
- Class: Hydrozoa
- Order: Narcomedusae
- Family: Tetraplatiidae; Collins et al., 2008
- Genus: Tetraplatia; Busch, 1851

Genera
- See text

= Tetraplatia =

Genus of hydrozoans

Tetraplatia is a genus of hydrozoans in the order Narcomedusae. It is the sole genus in the monotypic family Tetraplatidae.

== Taxonomy and systematics ==
Since their discovery in the 1850s, there has been disagreement over the phylogeny of the tetraplatids. Some authorities considered that they were aberrant hydrozoans while others thought that they were unusual scyphozoans, cubozoans or staurozoans. Examination of the ribosomal DNA has shown that they are hydrozoans in the order Narcomedusae. The genus seems to be of recent origin.

=== Genera and species ===
The World Register of Marine Species lists the following taxa in the family Tetraplatidae:

- Genus Tetraplatia Busch, 1851
  - Tetraplatia chuni Carlgren, 1909
  - Tetraplatia volitans Busch, 1851

== Characteristics ==
Unlike the other members of the order, members of the family Tetraplatidae have no tentacles nor bell but are worm-like in shape. The body is divided by a transverse groove beside which there are four muscular flaps or lappets used for swimming. Each of these contains two sense organs. In one species there are four flying buttresses alternating with the lappets. The gonads are epidermal and have lobes either side of the groove.

=== Tetraplatia chuni ===
Tetraplatia chuni is similar in shape and size to T. volitans but lacks the flying buttresses connecting the two ends. It seems to be a much rarer species as only a few specimens have been recorded. These have all been found in the southern Atlantic Ocean.

=== Tetraplatia volitans ===
Tetraplatia volitans has s spindle shaped body 4-9mm long with a transverse groove nearer the aboral end. Four flying buttresses arch over this groove and connect the oral and aboral ends. It has four longitudinal rows of nematocysts with four shorter rows in between. There are eight pairs of lappets with sense organs between. The species has a cosmopolitan distribution, being found worldwide from the surface down to a depth of about 900 meters. It feeds on small zooplankton.
