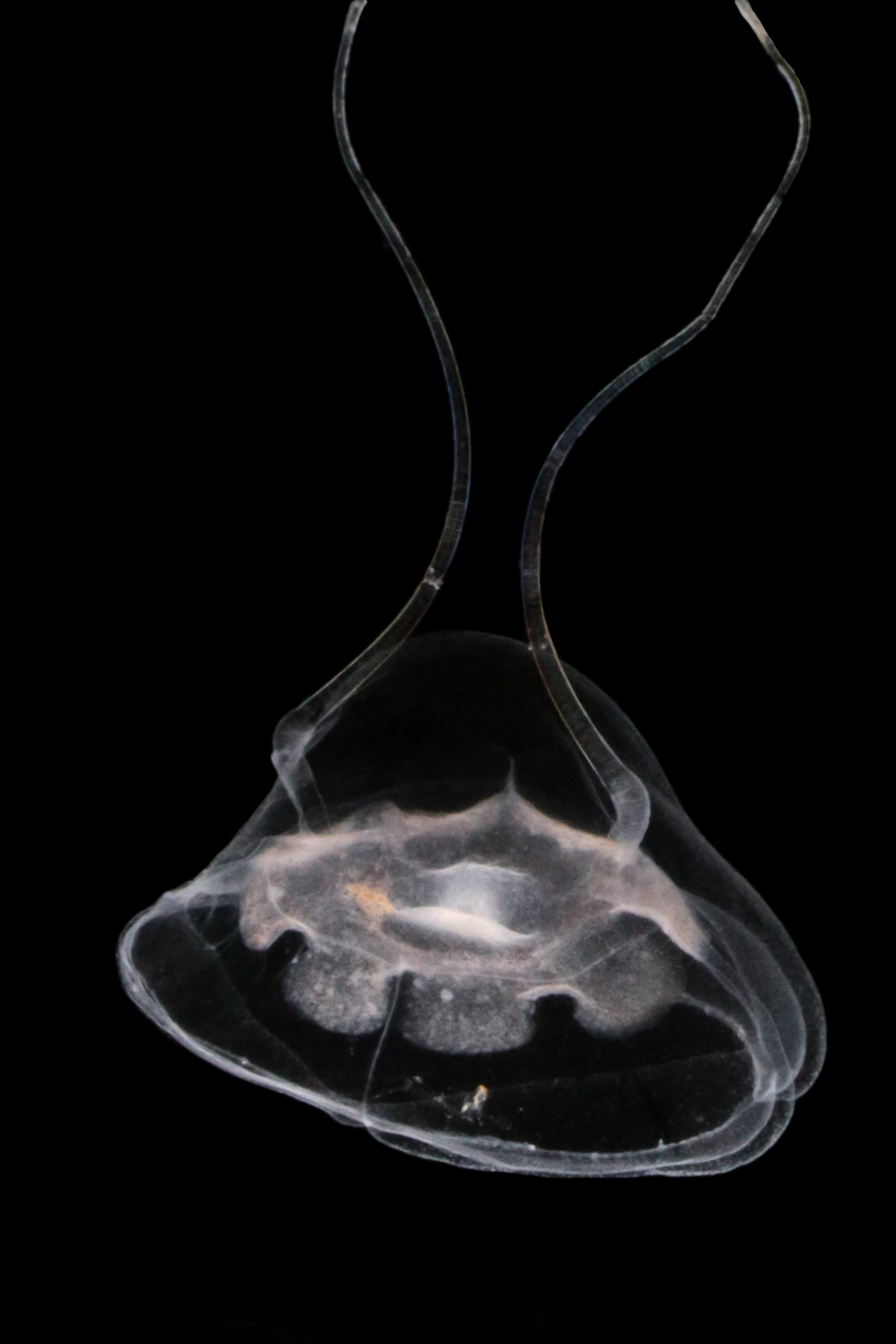
- Solmundella bitentaculata

Scientific classification
- Kingdom: Animalia
- Phylum: Cnidaria
- Class: Hydrozoa
- Order: Narcomedusae
- Family: Solmundaeginidae; Lindsay, Bentlage & Collins, 2017

Genera
- See text

= Solmundaeginidae =

Family of hydrozoans

Solmundaeginidae is a family of hydrozoans in the order Narcomedusae.

== Taxonomy ==
The following genera are recognized in the family Solmundaeginidae:

- Aeginopsis Brandt, 1835
- Solmundaegina Lindsay, 2017
- Solmundella Haeckel, 1879
