= Pseudaegina =

Scientific classification
- Domain: Eukaryota
- Kingdom: Animalia
- Phylum: Cnidaria
- Class: Hydrozoa
- Order: Narcomedusae
- Family: Pseudaeginidae; Lindsay, Bentlage & Collins, 2017
- Genus: Pseudaegina; Lindsay, 2017

Genus of hydrozoans

Pseudaegina is a genus of cnidarians belonging to the monotypic family Pseudaeginidae.

The species of this genus are found in Caribbean.

Species:

- Pseudaegina pentanema (Kishinouye, 1910)
- Pseudaegina rhodina (Haeckel, 1879)
