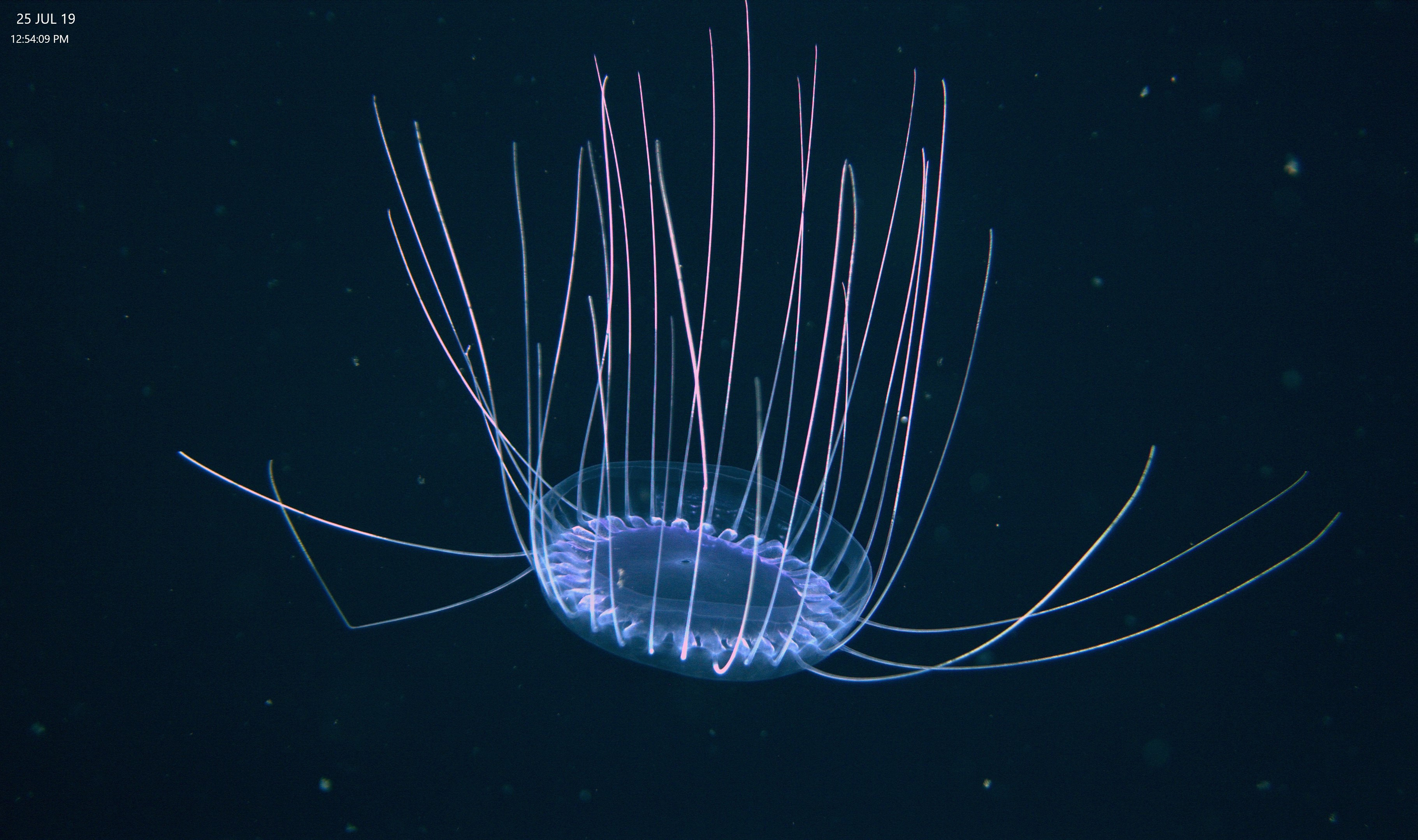

Scientific classification
- Kingdom: Animalia
- Phylum: Cnidaria
- Class: Hydrozoa
- Order: Narcomedusae
- Family: Cuninidae
- Genus: Solmissus; Haeckel, 1879

Species
- See text

= Solmissus =

Genus of hydrozoans

Solmissus, or dinner plate jellyfish, is a genus of hydrozoans. Its species are unique among cnidarians in that they actively hunt for prey as opposed to passively waiting for plankton to pass by. They are most likely to be found in the deep sea, mid water (700–1,000 m (2,300–3,300 ft)). They grow to be 20 cm (7.9 in) in diameter. These hydrozoans feed on gelatinous zooplankton, including salps and doliolids, ctenophores, jellyfish, and copepods. However, Solmissus may be limited to feeding on soft-bodied prey by the type of nematocysts on their tentacles (Mills).

== Species list ==
The genus Solmissus contains the following species:

- Solmissus albescens (Gegenbaur, 1857)
- Solmissus incisa (Fewkes, 1886)
- Solmissus marshalli Agassiz & Mayer, 1902

=== Invalid species ===
- Solmissus atlantica Zamponi, 1983 [taxon inquirendum]
- Solmissus bleekii Haeckel, 1879 [taxon inquirendum]
- Solmissus faberi Haeckel, 1879 [taxon inquirendum]
