= Aegina (cnidarian) =

Scientific classification
- Kingdom: Animalia
- Phylum: Cnidaria
- Class: Hydrozoa
- Order: Narcomedusae
- Family: Aeginidae
- Genus: Aegina; Eschscholtz, 1829

Species
- See text

Synonyms
- Cunarcha Haeckel, 1879

Genus of hydrozoans

Aegina citrea is a genus of hydrozoans in the family Aeginidae.

== Species ==
There are two recognized species in the genus Aegina:

- Aegina citrea Eschscholtz, 1829
- Aegina rosea Eschscholtz, 1829
