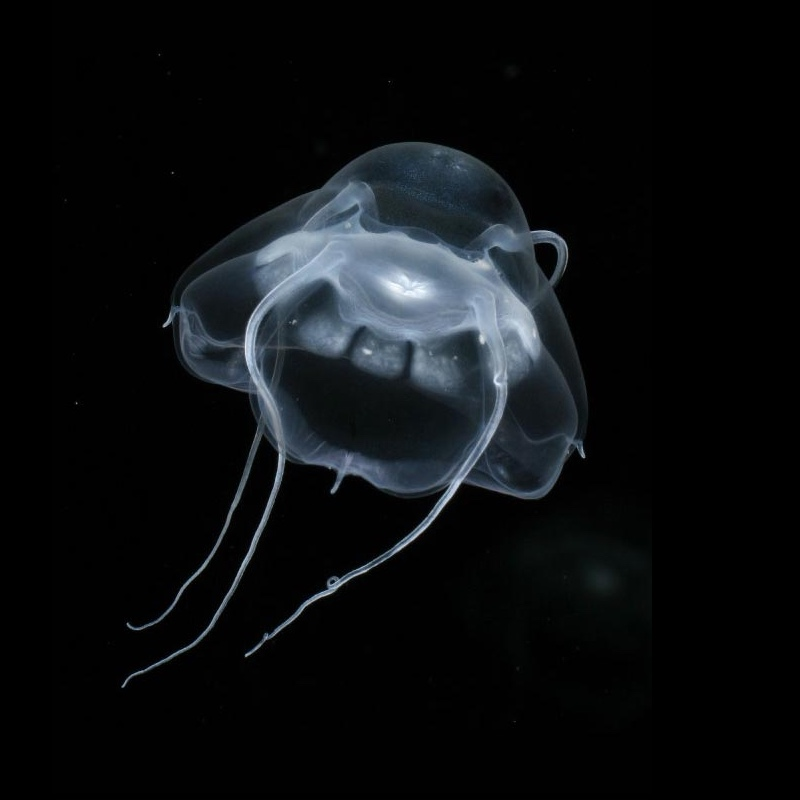

Scientific classification
- Kingdom: Animalia
- Phylum: Cnidaria
- Class: Hydrozoa
- Order: Narcomedusae
- Family: Aeginidae
- Genus: Bathykorus; Raskoff, 2010
- Species: B. bouilloni

Binomial name
- Bathykorus bouilloni Raskoff, 2010

= Bathykorus =

Genus of hydrozoans

Bathykorus bouilloni is a species of hydrozoan first described in 2010. It is a deep-sea species found in the Arctic Ocean, and appears to be common at depths below 1,000 m (3,300 ft). It is the only species in the monotypic genus Bathykorus. The genus name comes from the Greek bathy meaning "deep" and korus meaning "helmet", referring to the depth at which this species is found and to the shape of the bell. Its helmet-like appearance bears a resemblance to the helmet of Darth Vader, giving it the nickname Darth Vader jellyfish. The specific name is in honour of Dr. Jean Bouillon, (1926–2009), a marine zoologist.

== Description ==
B. bouilloni is a small, gelatinous hydrozoan growing to around 2 cm (0.8 in) in width. It is transparent and pale blue, with four primary noncontractile tentacles set high above the margin of the dome-shaped bell. Lower down near the undulating margin are four short secondary tentacles, each with a statocyst on either side. The central circular mouth on the oral surface leads to a gastric chamber out of which lead 12 gastric pouches, three in each quadrant. The primary tentacles are solid and usually held above the bell in the direction of locomotion when the animal is foraging. The tentacles bear cnidocytes on the aboral side. The gonads have not yet been observed, perhaps because they were not ripe at the time of the year when observations were made (June/July).

== Distribution ==
B. bouilloni is found in the Arctic Ocean, especially around Greenland and the north of Canada. The jellyfish can only be found at an underwater depth range of 800 to 2,500 m (2,600 to 8,200 ft), but it is more common in the middle of this range.

== Biology ==
Because of the depths at which this species is found, it is not possible to visually observe it in situ, and observations are usually made by remotely operated underwater vehicles. Nor is it easy to study specimens because they tend not to survive capture by netting. Some individuals have been caught by gentle suction and brought to the surface and it has proved possible to keep these alive in dark tanks at 1 °C (34 °F) for a week or more.
