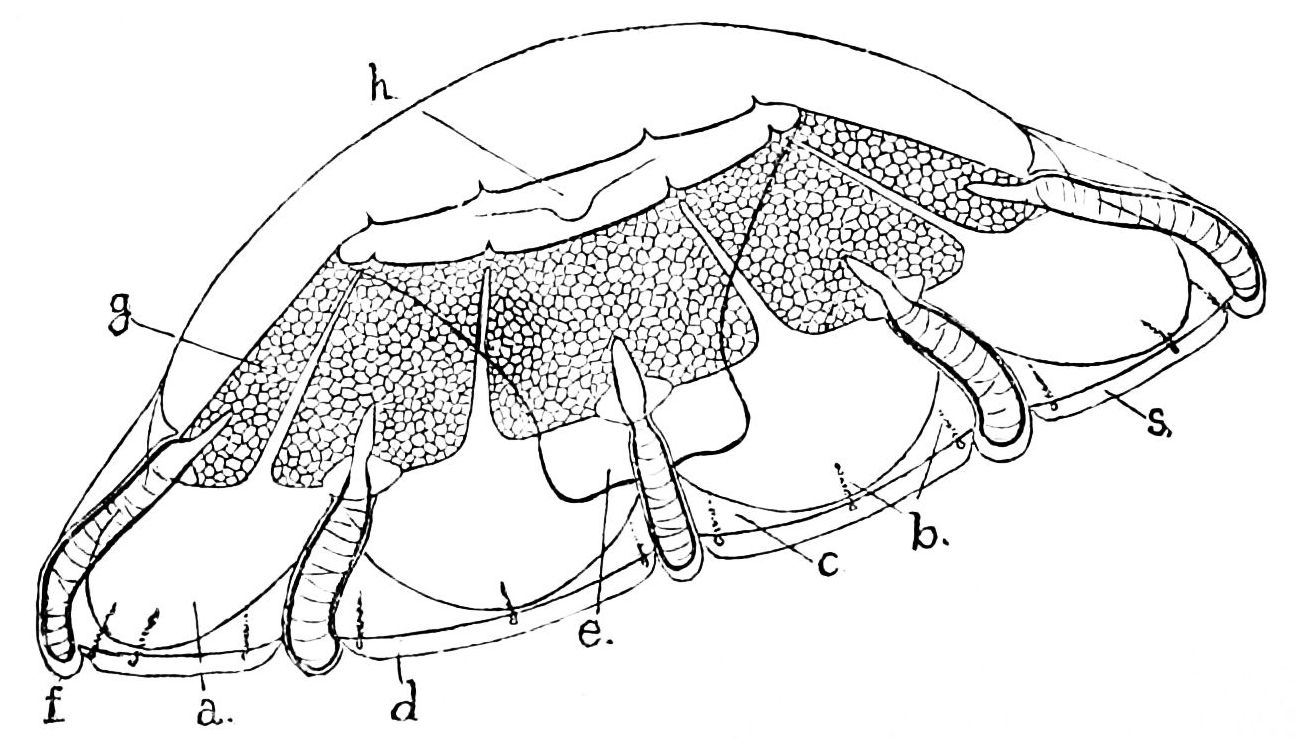
- Cunina octonaria

Scientific classification
- Kingdom: Animalia
- Phylum: Cnidaria
- Class: Hydrozoa
- Order: Narcomedusae
- Family: Cuninidae; Bigelow, 1913

Genera
- See text

= Cuninidae =

Family of hydrozoans

Cuninidae is a family of hydrozoans in the order Narcomedusae. They have dome-shaped bells and tentacles set above the undulating margin of the bell. Their gastric pouches contain the gonads situated in line with the tentacles, the number of pouches being the same as the number of tentacles. The pouches do not extend below the points of origin of the primary tentacles. Members of some genera have a peripheral canal system and others do not. No radial canals or secondary tentacles are present.

== Systematics ==
The World Register of Marine Species lists the following taxa:

- Genus Cunina Eschscholtz, 1829
  - Cunina becki Bouillon, 1985
  - Cunina discoides Fewkes, 1881
  - Cunina duplicata Maas, 1893
  - Cunina fowleri (Browne, 1906)
  - Cunina frugifera Kramp, 1948
  - Cunina globosa Eschscholtz, 1829
  - Cunina octonaria McCrady, 1857
  - Cunina peregrina Bigelow, 1909
  - Cunina proboscidea E. & L. Metschnikoff, 1871
  - Cunina simplex Gili, Bouillon, Pagès, Palanques, Puig & Heussner, 1998
  - Cunina tenella (Bigelow, 1909)
- Genus Sigiweddellia Bouillon, Pagès & Gili, 2001
  - Sigiweddellia benthopelagica Bouillon, Pagès & Gili, 2001
- Genus Solmissus
  - Solmissus albescens (Gegenbaur, 1856)
  - Solmissus incisa (Fewkes, 1886)
  - Solmissus marshalli Agassiz & Mayer, 1902
