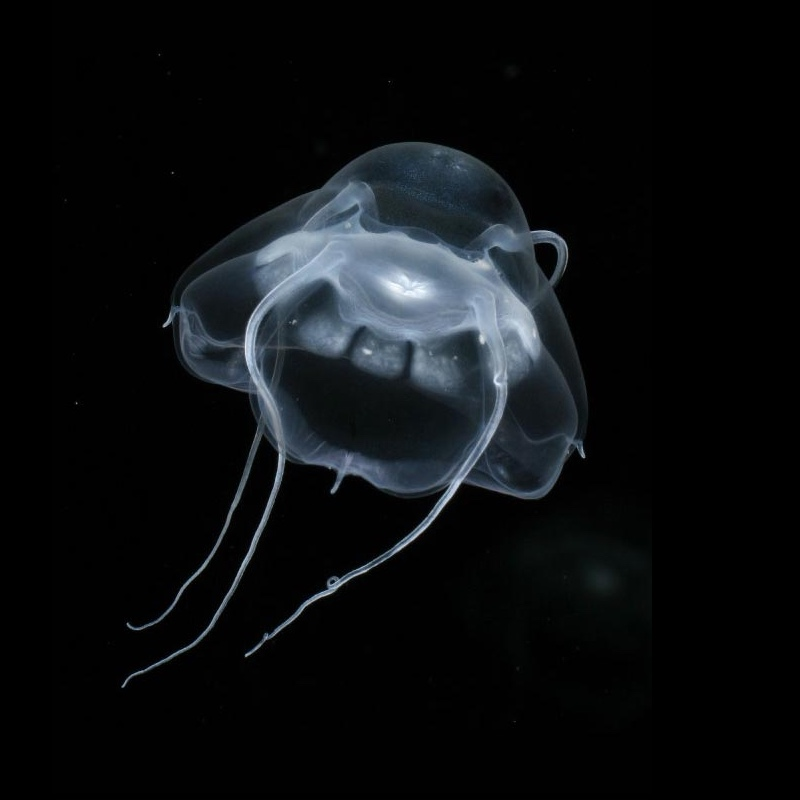
- Bathykorus bouilloni

Scientific classification
- Kingdom: Animalia
- Phylum: Cnidaria
- Class: Hydrozoa
- Order: Narcomedusae
- Family: Aeginidae; Gegenbauer, 1857

Genera
- See text

Synonyms
- Cunanthidae Haeckel, 1879

= Aeginidae =

Family of hydrozoans

Aeginidae is a family of hydrozoans in the order Narcomedusae. The family comprises 6 genera and 8 species.

== Taxonomy ==
The following genera are recognized in the family Aeginidae:

- Aegina Eschscholtz, 1829 (2 species)
- Aeginona Lindsay, 2017 (monotypic – Aeginona brunnea)
- Aeginura Haeckel, 1879 (2 species)
- Bathykorus Raskoff, 2010 (monotypic – Bathykorus bouilloni)
- Jubanyella Fuentes & Pages, 2006 (monotypic – Jubanyella plemmyris)
- Otoporpa Xu & Zhang, 1978 (monotypic – Otoporpa polystriata)

== Description ==
Hydrozoans with dome-shaped bells and tentacles set above the undulating margin of the bell. There are gastric pouches containing the gonads situated between the tentacles, the number of pouches being greater than the number of tentacles. The pouches extend below the points of origin of the primary tentacles. Some genera have a peripheral canal system and others do not, and some have secondary tentacles.
