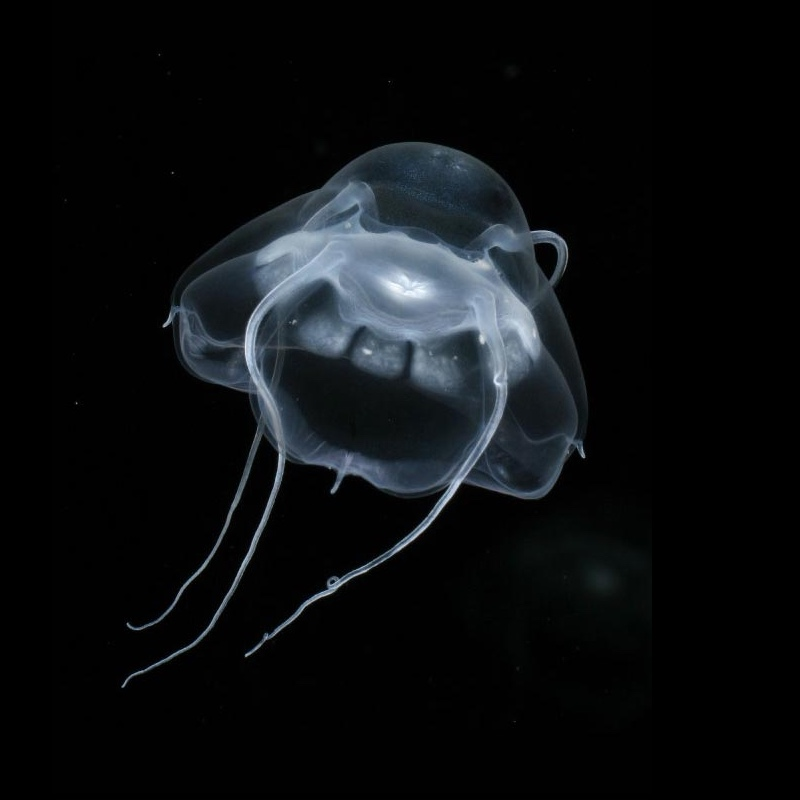
- Bathykorus bouilloni (Aeginidae)

Scientific classification
- Kingdom: Animalia
- Phylum: Cnidaria
- Class: Hydrozoa
- Subclass: Trachylinae
- Order: Narcomedusae; Haeckel, 1879

Families
- Aeginidae; Csiromedusidae; Cuninidae; Pseudaeginidae; Solmarisidae; Solmundaeginidae; Tetraplatidae

= Narcomedusae =

Order of hydrozoans

Narcomedusae is an order of hydrozoans in the subclass Trachylinae. Members of this order do not normally have a polyp stage. The medusa has a dome-shaped bell with thin sides. The tentacles are attached above the lobed margin of the bell with usually a gastric pouch above each. There are no bulbs on the tentacles and no radial canals. Narcomedusans are mostly inhabitants of the open sea and deep waters. They can be found in the Mediterranean in large numbers. Narcomedusae are essential to the ecosystem as they are top-down regulators for the midwater environment.

== Feeding behavior ==
Narcomedusae use their tentacles to catch large, fast-moving prey. They do this by holding their tentacles perpendicular to the direction they are swimming to cover a larger area. If something is caught they bend the tentacle inwards and coil them at the tips to their mouths.

== Reproductive features ==
Narcomedusae are hermaphroditic, meaning that they have both male and female reproductive organs. As a result they release their eggs and sperm into the water which is also where fertilization happens. Once the eggs are fertilized they then develop into a stage called planula which can be defined as a larval stage and it then lives in the seafloor. These jellyfish are capable of reproducing all year round, although this depends on their reproductive cycle and patterns as they fluctuate depending on factors such as environmental conditions and food availability.

== Anatomy ==
Narcomedusae lack radial canals and have an umbrella that is rather flat. It has a quadratic dome that has a diameter of 4 to 11 mm. Narcomedusae have four tentacles that leave the umbrella near the level of the stomach. They have a stomach that is broad and circular and do not have a pouch. These jellyfish have tentacles that are solid that curve upwards into the mesoglea above the stomach.

== Gallery ==
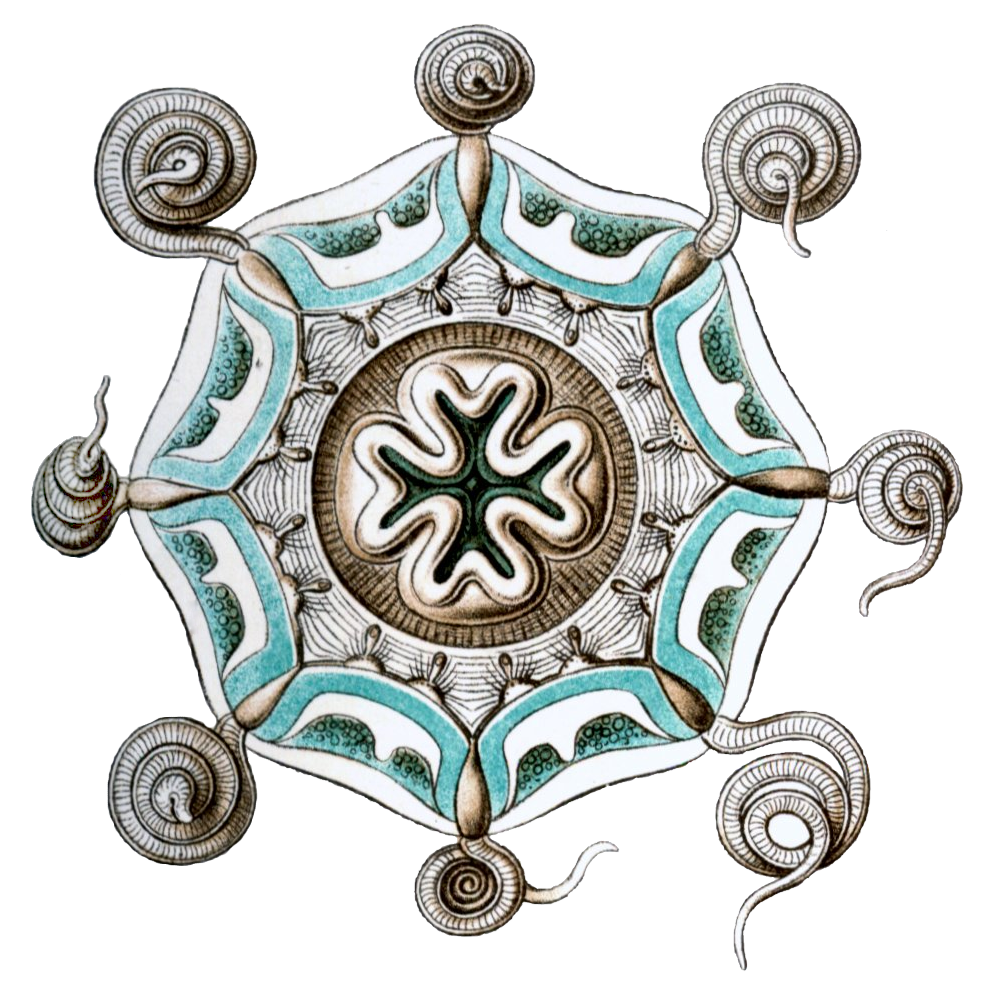
Aeginura grimaldii by Ernst Haeckel
