= Haliscera =

Scientific classification
- Kingdom: Animalia
- Phylum: Cnidaria
- Class: Hydrozoa
- Order: Trachymedusae
- Family: Halicreatidae
- Genus: Haliscera; Vanhöffen, 1902

Species
- See text

Genus of hydrozoans

Haliscera is a genus of hydrozoans in the family Halicreatidae.

== Species ==
There are three recognized species in the genus Haliscera:

- Haliscera bigelowi Kramp, 1947
- Haliscera conica Vanhöffen, 1902
- Haliscera racovitzae Maas, 1906

=== Invalid species names ===
- Haliscera alba Vanhöffen, 1902 [species inquirenda]
