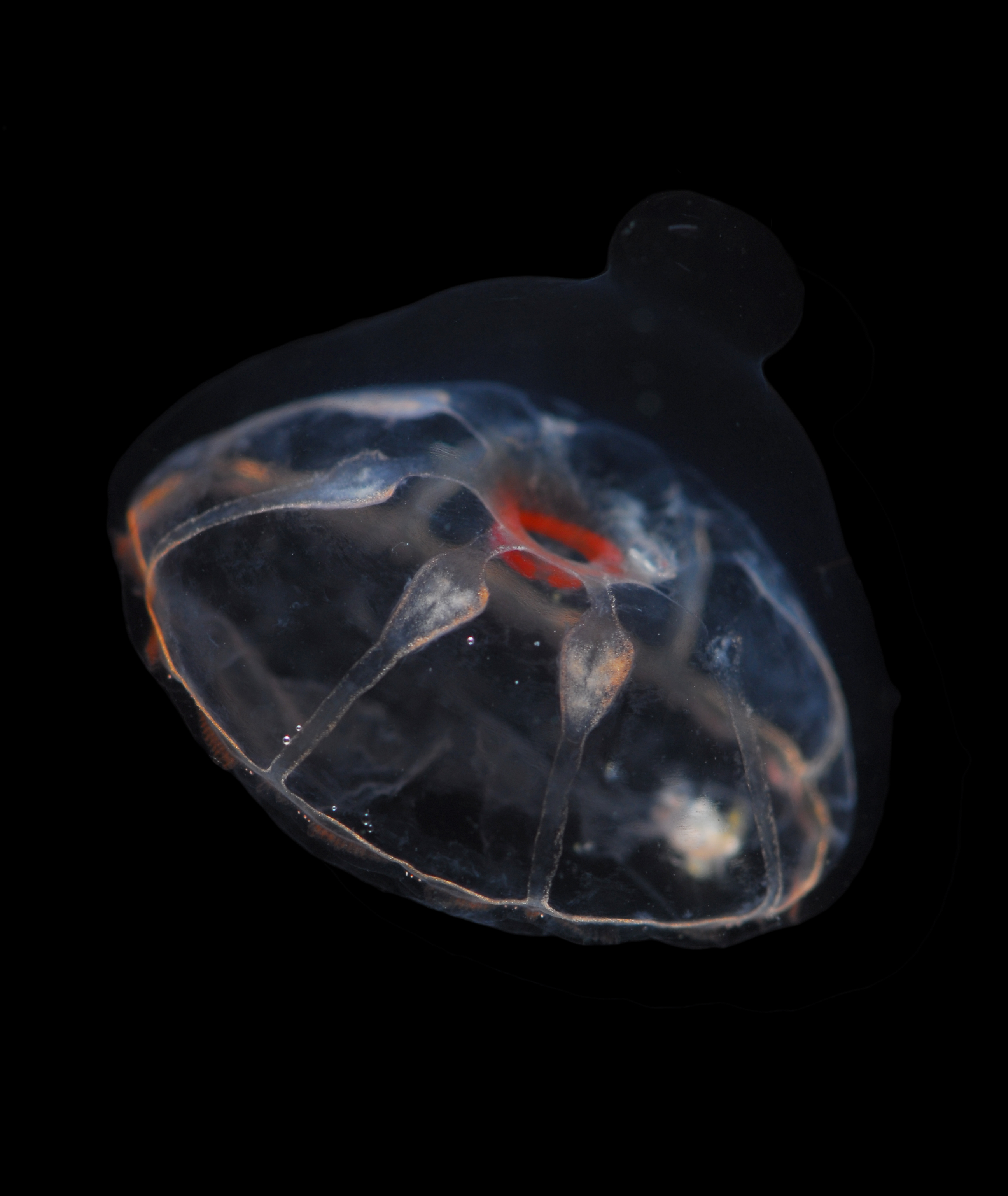
- Botrynema brucei

Scientific classification
- Kingdom: Animalia
- Phylum: Cnidaria
- Class: Hydrozoa
- Order: Trachymedusae
- Family: Halicreatidae
- Genus: Botrynema; Browne, 1908

Species
- See text

Synonyms
- Alloionema Hartlaub, 1909

= Botrynema =

Genus of hydrozoans

Botrynema is a genus of hydrozoans in the family Halicreatidae.

== Species ==
There are two recognized species in the genus Botrynema:

- Botrynema brucei Browne, 1908
- Botrynema ellinorae (Hartlaub, 1909)
