= Haliscera racovitzae =

Scientific classification
- Kingdom: Animalia
- Phylum: Cnidaria
- Class: Hydrozoa
- Order: Trachymedusae
- Family: Halicreatidae
- Genus: Haliscera
- Species: H. racovitzae

Binomial name
- Haliscera racovitzae (Maas, 1906)

Synonyms
- Homoeonema racovitzae Maas, 1906

Species of hydrozoan

Haliscera racovitzae is a species of deep sea hydrozoan of the family Halicreatidae. It's a hydroid polyp of the family Halicreatidae, and it belongs to the genus Haliscera. Haliscera racovitzae was first scientifically described by Maas in 1906.
