= Haliscera bigelowi =

Scientific classification
- Kingdom: Animalia
- Phylum: Cnidaria
- Class: Hydrozoa
- Order: Trachymedusae
- Family: Halicreatidae
- Genus: Haliscera
- Species: H. bigelowi

Binomial name
- Haliscera bigelowi Kramp, 1947

Species of hydrozoan

Haliscera bigelowi is a species of deep sea hydrozoan of the family Halicreatidae.

== Description ==
Umbrella 15–17 mm wide, 9–10 mm high, almost hemispherical, with very thick, hemispherical apex; about 96 marginal tentacles in adults; about 12 marginal tentacles and 3 statocysts in each octant; thickening of marginal cnidocyst tissue less pronounced than in H. conica; gonads broadly oval, about 2/5 as long as radial canals, located slightly nearer manubrium than bell margin.
