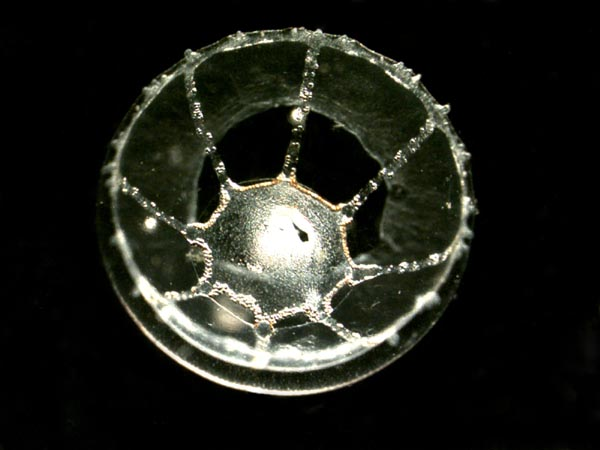
- Botrynema ellinorae

Scientific classification
- Kingdom: Animalia
- Phylum: Cnidaria
- Class: Hydrozoa
- Order: Trachymedusae
- Family: Halicreatidae; Fewkes, 1886

Genera
- See text

= Halicreatidae =

Family of hydrozoans

Halicreatidae is a family of hydrozoans. The family comprises 6 genera and 9 species.

== Taxonomy ==
Image	Genus	Living species
	Botrynema Browne, 1908	Botrynema brucei Browne, 1908; Botrynema ellinorae (Hartlaub, 1909)
	Halicreas Fewkes, 1882	Halicreas minimum
	Haliscera Vanhöffen, 1902	Haliscera bigelowi Kramp, 1947; Haliscera conica Vanhöffen, 1902; Haliscera racovitzae Maas, 1906
	Halitrephes Bigelow, 1909	Halitrephes maasi
	Homoeonema Maas, 1893	Homoeonema platygonon
	Varitentacula He, 1980	Varitentacula yantaiensis
