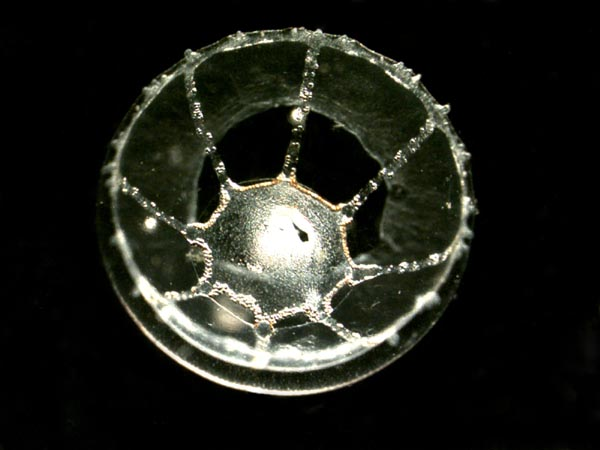
- Botrynema ellinorae

Scientific classification
- Domain: Eukaryota
- Kingdom: Animalia
- Phylum: Cnidaria
- Class: Hydrozoa
- Order: Trachymedusae
- Family: Halicreatidae
- Genus: Botrynema
- Species: B. ellinorae

Binomial name
- Botrynema ellinorae (Hartlaub, 1909)

Synonyms
- Alloionema ellinorae Hartlaub, 1909

= Botrynema ellinorae =

Species of hydrozoan

Botrynema ellinorae is a species of hydrozoan in the family Halicreatidae.

This species grows up to 3 cm, is translucent and clear with hues of blue or white. The top of the bell is rounded. Botrynema ellinorae lives mainly in the Arctic, but has been recorded in subarctic regions of the Atlantic Ocean. It is found in the mesopelagic and bathypelagic zones, and is known to occur at depths of between 400 and 1,400 metres. Specimens captured in plankton nets suggest that it may live as deep as 1,000 to 2,000 metres and occasionally deeper. Its diet is unknown. This species probably has no polyp stage and is holoplanktonic.
