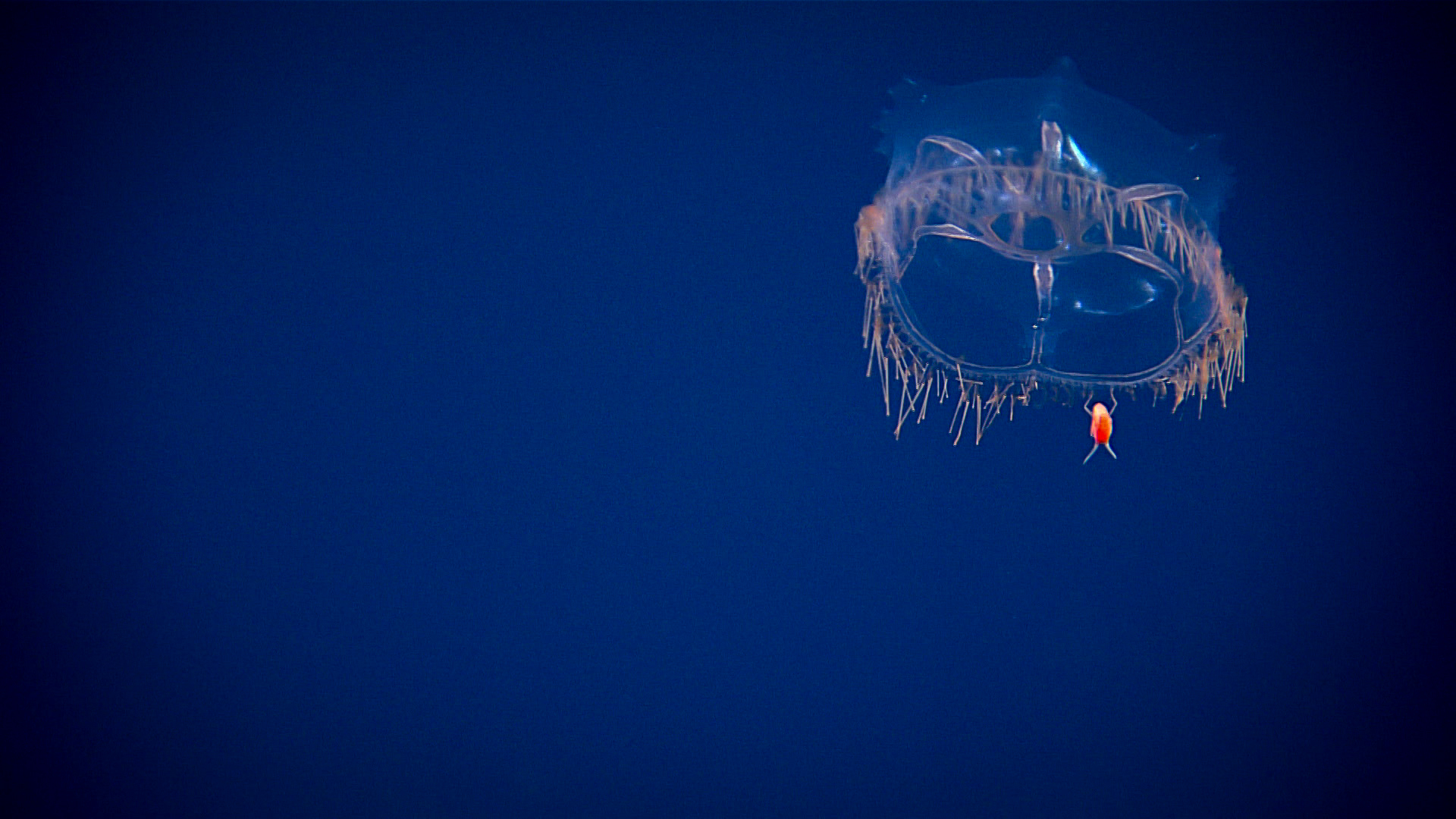

Scientific classification
- Kingdom: Animalia
- Phylum: Cnidaria
- Class: Hydrozoa
- Order: Trachymedusae
- Family: Halicreatidae
- Genus: Halicreas; Fewkes, 1882
- Species: H. minimum

Binomial name
- Halicreas minimum Fewkes, 1882

Synonyms
- Halicreas papillosum Vanhöffen, 1902

= Halicreas =

Genus of hydrozoans

Halicreas minimum is a species of deep sea hydrozoan of the family Halicreatidae. It is the only species in the monotypic genus Halicreas.

== Description ==
Umbrella 30–40 mm wide, thick, disk-like, with small apical projection; 8 clusters of gelatinous papillae above margin, mouth wide circular opening; 8 broad, band-like, radial canals; broad circular canal; gonads flattened, extending along almost entire length of radial canals; tentacles up to 640; 3-4 statocysts in each octant.
