= Haliscera conica =

Scientific classification
- Kingdom: Animalia
- Phylum: Cnidaria
- Class: Hydrozoa
- Order: Trachymedusae
- Family: Halicreatidae
- Genus: Haliscera
- Species: H. conica

Binomial name
- Haliscera conica Vanhöffen, 1902

Species of hydrozoan

Haliscera conica is a species of hydrozoan belonging to the family Halicreatidae.

== Description ==
Umbrella up to 18 mm, with very thick, bluntly conical projection; 64-72 marginal tentacles in adults; 8-9 tentacles and 2 statocysts in each octant; the base of tentacles surrounded by broad thickening of marginal cnidocyst tissue; gonads oval, well separated from manubrium in the middle portion of 8 broad radial canals.
