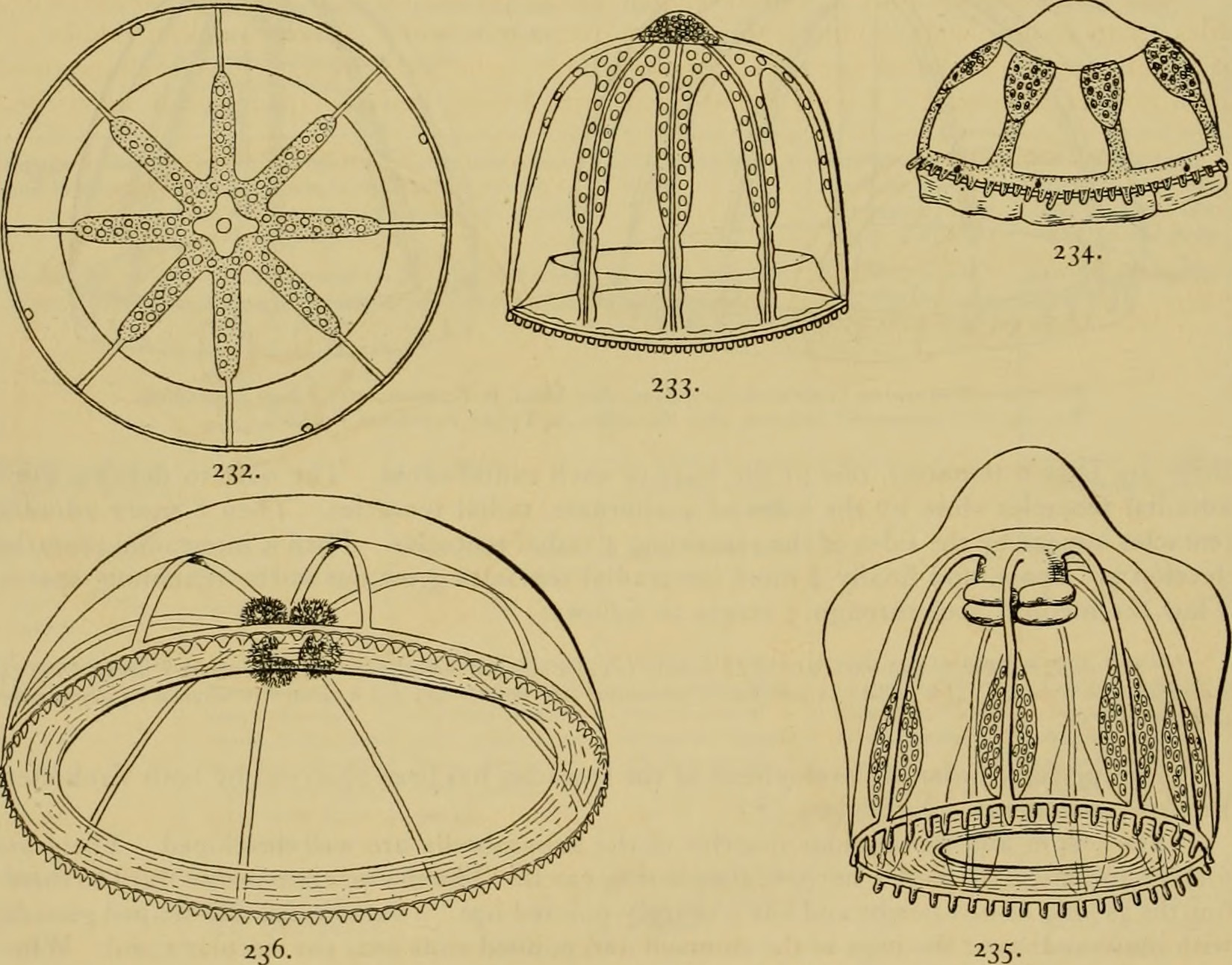

Scientific classification
- Kingdom: Animalia
- Phylum: Cnidaria
- Class: Hydrozoa
- Order: Trachymedusae
- Family: Halicreatidae
- Genus: Homoeonema; Maas, 1893
- Species: H. platygonon

Binomial name
- Homoeonema platygonon Maas, 1893

Synonyms
- Homoeonema platygonum

= Homoeonema =

Genus of hydrozoans

Homoeonema platygonon is a species of deep sea hydrozoan of the family Halicreatidae. It is the only species in the monotypic genus Homoeonema.
