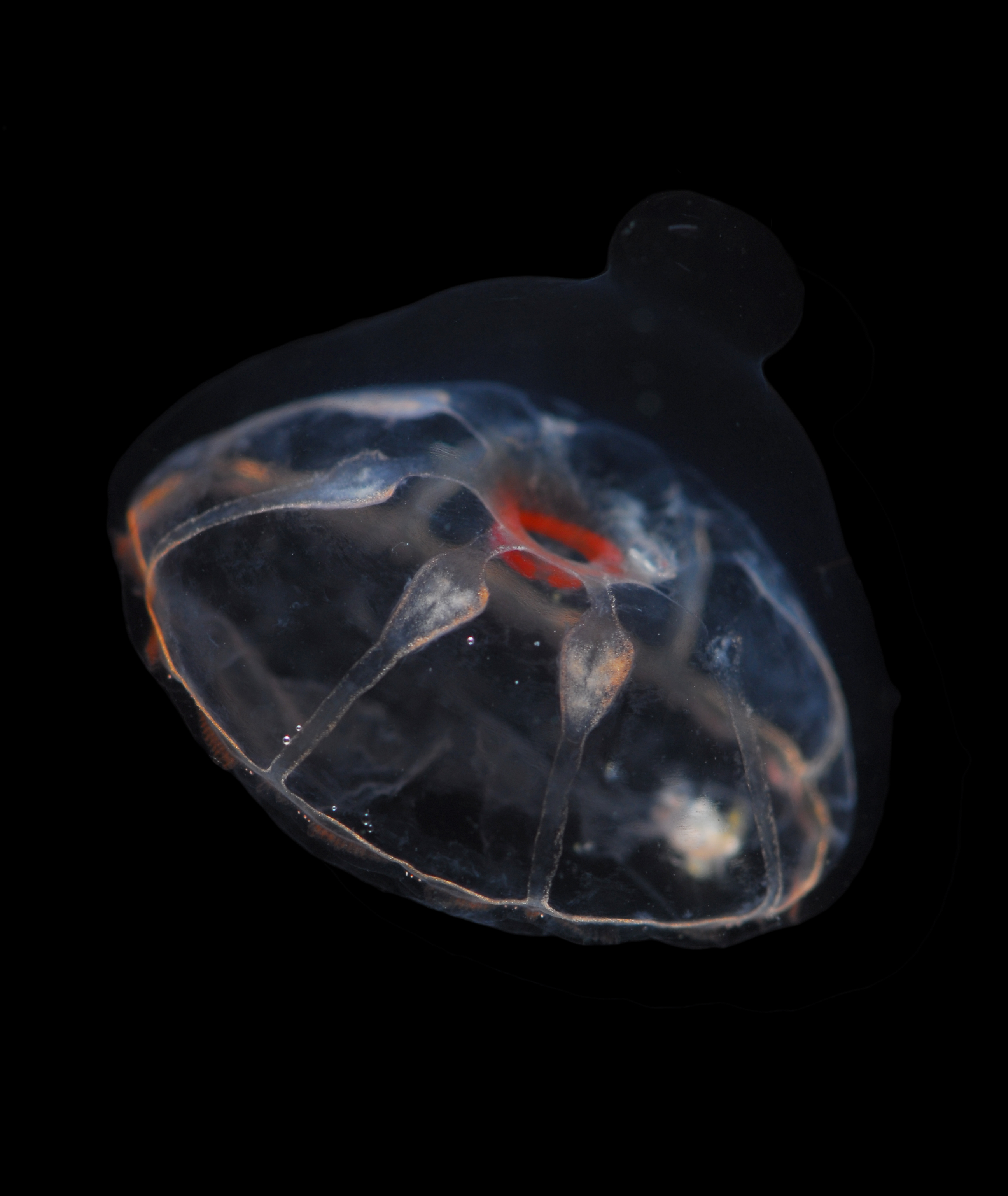

Scientific classification
- Kingdom: Animalia
- Phylum: Cnidaria
- Class: Hydrozoa
- Order: Trachymedusae
- Family: Halicreatidae
- Genus: Botrynema
- Species: B. brucei

Binomial name
- Botrynema brucei Browne, 1908

= Botrynema brucei =

Species of hydrozoan

Botrynema brucei is a common mid-water Arctic hydrozoan, of the family Halicreatidae.

== Characteristics ==
The length of its body is up to 3 cm and is clear translucent, with white or blue hues. It has 11-12 marginal tentacles in 16 easily broken groups and 8 radial canals. The top of bell has a knob-shopped process.

== Habitat ==
It is primarily found in the Arctic Ocean, with some records in the subarctic Atlantic. Bathypelagic ROV observations have been recorded between 900 and 2600 m, while plankton nets suggest slightly greater numbers below 2000 m, than of between 1000 and 2000 m
