= Varitentacula =

Scientific classification
- Kingdom: Animalia
- Phylum: Cnidaria
- Class: Hydrozoa
- Order: Trachymedusae
- Family: Halicreatidae
- Genus: Varitentacula; He, 1980
- Species: V. yantaiensis

Binomial name
- Varitentacula yantaiensis He, 1980

Genus of hydrozoans

Varitentacula yantaiensis is a species of deep sea hydrozoan of the family Halicreatidae. It is the only species in the monotypic genus Varitentacula.
