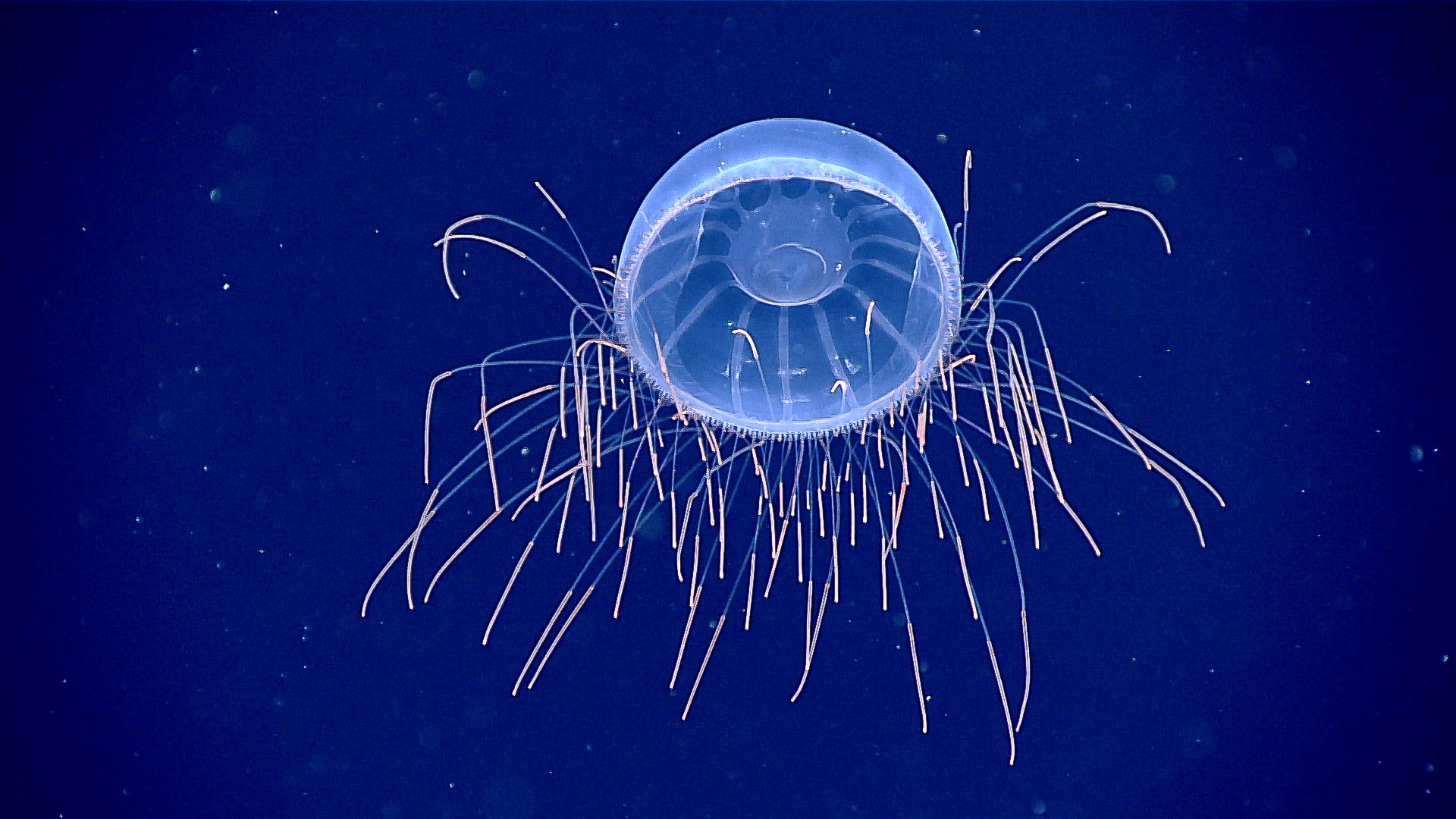

Scientific classification
- Kingdom: Animalia
- Phylum: Cnidaria
- Class: Hydrozoa
- Order: Trachymedusae
- Family: Halicreatidae
- Genus: Halitrephes; Bigelow, H. B. (1909)
- Species: H. maasi

Binomial name
- Halitrephes maasi Bigelow, H. B. (1909)

Synonyms
- Halitrephes medius Kramp, 1948; Halitrephes valdiviae Vanhöffen, 1912

= Halitrephes =

Genus of hydrozoans

Halitrephes maasi, commonly known as the firework jellyfish, is a species of deep-sea hydrozoan of the family Halicreatidae. Sightings have been reported at depths of 4,000 to 5,000 feet (1,200 to 1,500 m) near the Revillagigedo Archipelago off the Baja California Peninsula.

Although not much is known regarding this species, H. maasi has been observed in both temperate and tropical waters of the Atlantic, Indo-Pacific, Antarctic, Mediterranean, and eastern Pacific. This hydromedusa is typically bathypelagic, most commonly found in oxygen-minimal zones and deep waters.

Like all cnidarians, H. maasi is a diploblastic acoelomate metazoan. It has only one opening that functions as both its mouth and its anus.
