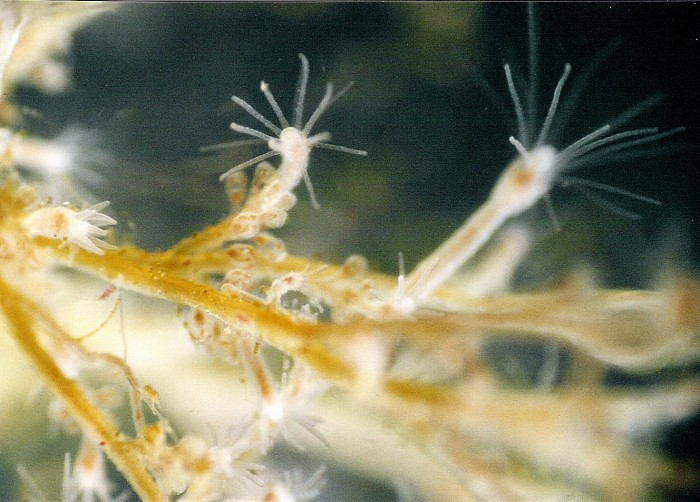
- Bougainvillia muscus

Scientific classification
- Kingdom: Animalia
- Phylum: Cnidaria
- Class: Hydrozoa
- Order: Anthoathecata
- Suborder: Filifera; Kühn, 1913

Families
- See text

= Filifera =

Suborder of hydrozoans

Filifera is a suborder of hydrozoans in the order Anthoathecata. They are found in marine, brackish and freshwater habitats.

== Characteristics ==
Members of this suborder are characterised by the filiform tentacles of the polyps which do not terminate in knobs. The rose corals, family Stylasteridae, secrete calcium carbonate exoskeletons around a network of stolons.

== Families ==
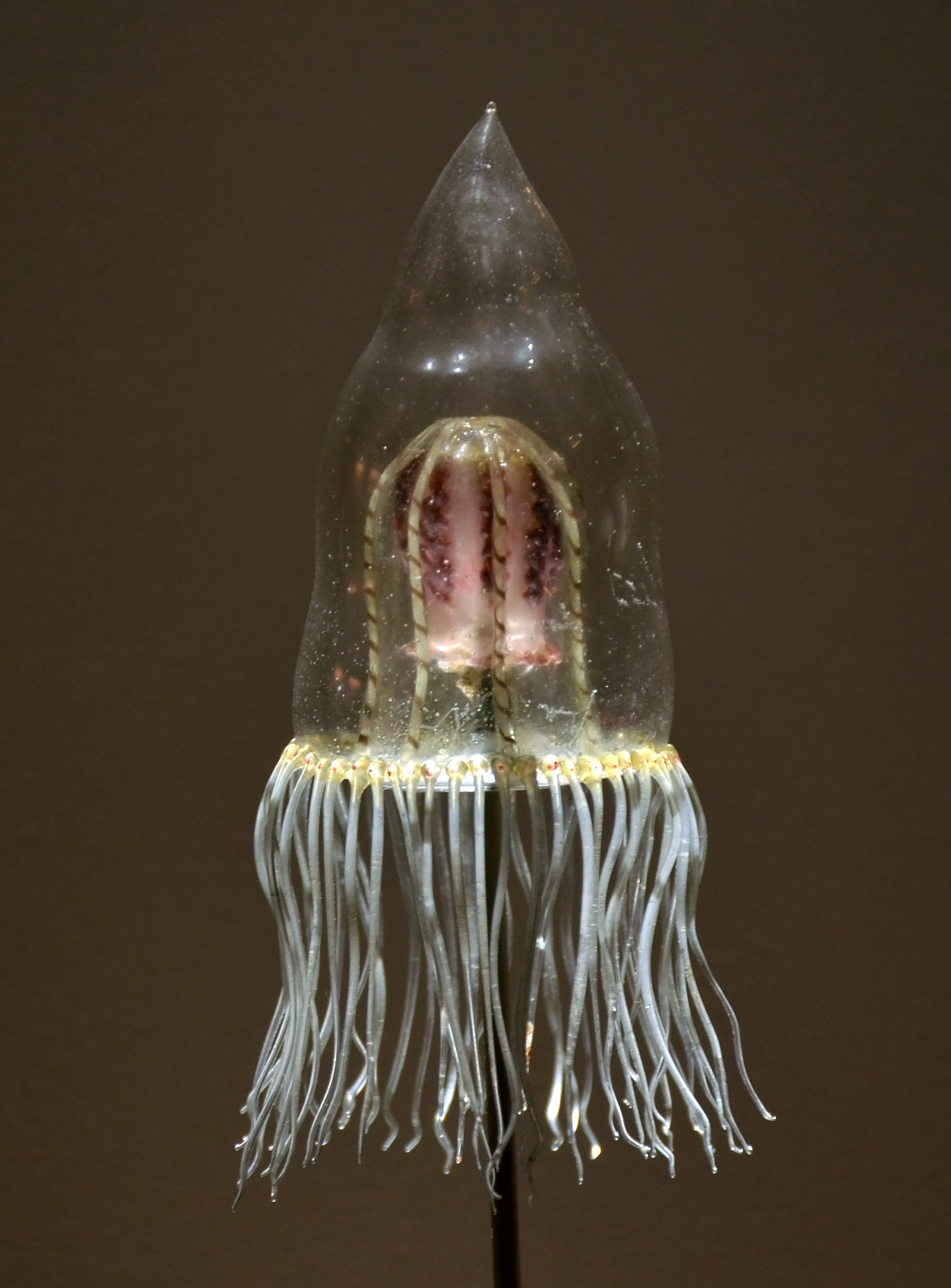
Glass model of Neoturris pileata

According to the World Register of Marine Species, the following families are found in this suborder :

- Australomedusidae Russell, 1971
- Axoporidae Boschma, 1951 †
- Balellidae Stechow, 1922
- Bougainvilliidae Lütken, 1850
- Bythotiaridae Maas, 1905
- Clathrozoellidae Peña Cantero, Vervoort & Watson, 2003
- Cordylophoridae von Lendenfeld, 1885
- Cytaeididae L. Agassiz, 1862
- Eucodoniidae Schuchert, 1996
- Eudendriidae L. Agassiz, 1862
- Heterotentaculidae Schuchert, 2010
- Hydractiniidae L. Agassiz, 1862
- Jeanbouilloniidae Pagès, Flood & Youngbluth, 2006
- Magapiidae Schuchert & Bouillon, 2009
- Niobiidae Petersen, 1979
- Oceaniidae Eschscholtz, 1829
- Pandeidae Haeckel, 1879
- Proboscidactylidae Hand & Hendrickson, 1950
- Protiaridae Haeckel, 1879
- Ptilocodiidae Coward, 1909
- Rathkeidae Russell, 1953
- Rhysiidae (Hickson & Gravely, 1907)
- Similiclavidae Calder, Choong & McDaniel, 2015
- Stylasteridae Gray, 1847
- Trichydridae Hincks, 1868
- Tubiclavoididae Moura, Cunha & Schuchert, 2007
- Filifera incertae sedis
