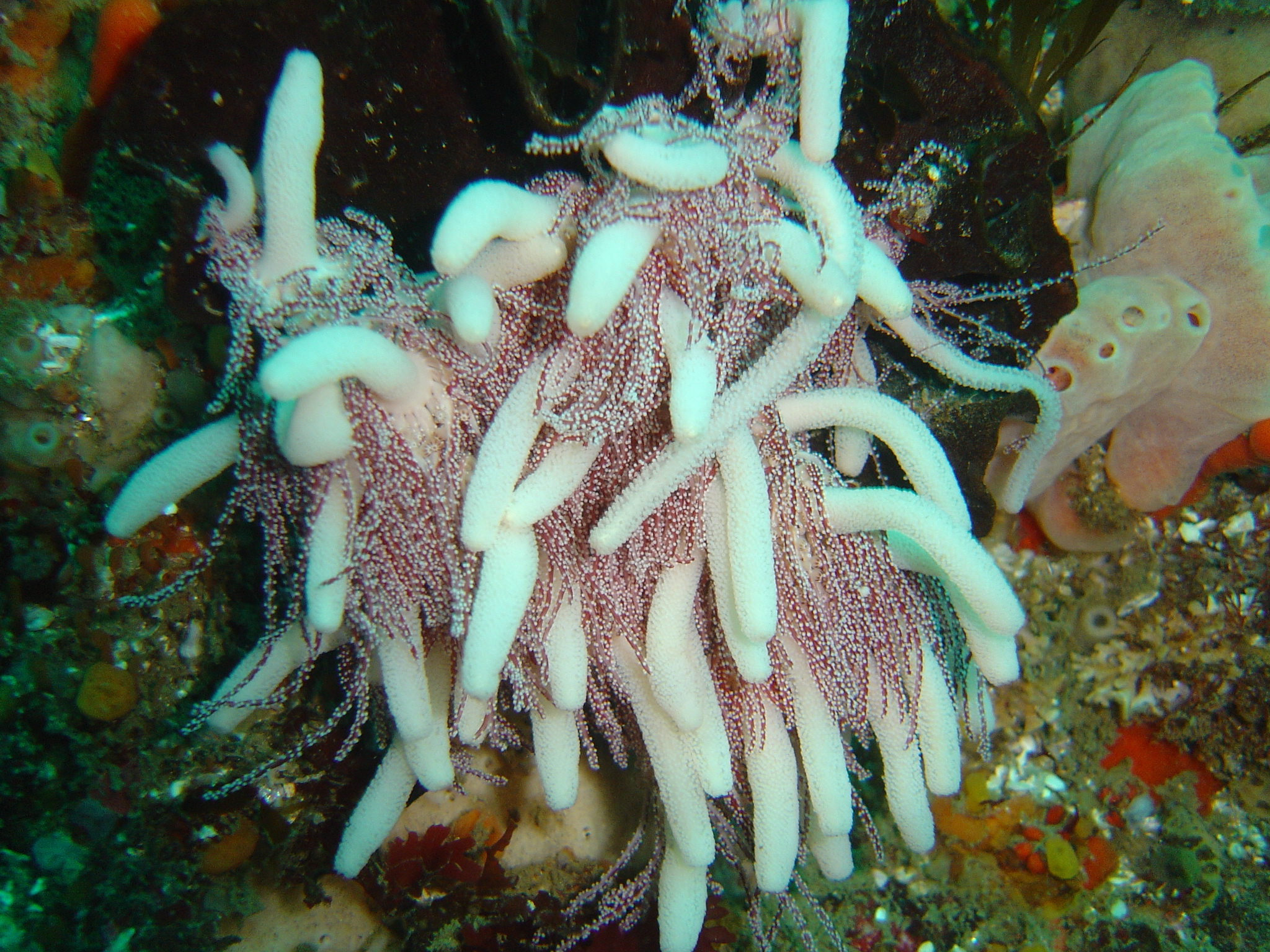
- Myriothela tentaculata

Scientific classification
- Kingdom: Animalia
- Phylum: Cnidaria
- Class: Hydrozoa
- Order: Anthoathecata
- Suborder: Aplanulata; Collins, Winkelman, Hadrys & Schierwater, 2005

Families
- See text

= Aplanulata =

Suborder of hydrozoans

Aplanulata is a suborder of Hydrozoa, a class of marine and freshwater invertebrates belonging to the phylum Cnidaria. The group have lost its planula larval stage, and the only remnants of the medusa stage is when they function as gonophores attached to the polyp.

== Families ==
According to the World Register of Marine Species, the following families are found in this suborder:

- Acaulidae Fraser, 1924
- Boeromedusidae Bouillon, 1995
- Boreohydridae Westblad, 1947
- Candelabridae Stechow, 1921
- Corymorphidae Allman, 1872
- Hydridae Dana, 1846
- Margelopsidae Uchida, 1927
- Paracorynidae Picard, 1957
- Protohydridae Allman, 1888
- Tubulariidae Goldfuss, 1818
