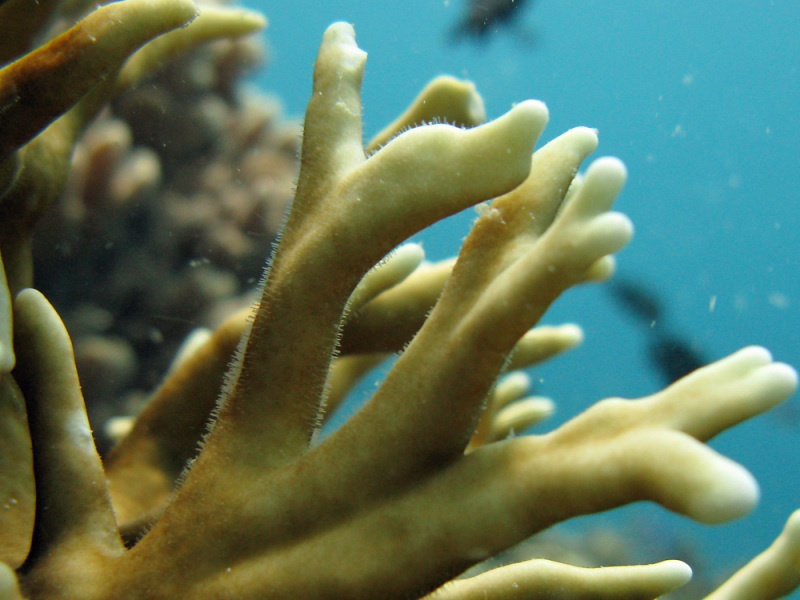
- Millepora tenella with polyps expanded

Scientific classification
- Kingdom: Animalia
- Phylum: Cnidaria
- Class: Hydrozoa
- Order: Anthoathecata
- Suborder: Capitata

Families
- See text

= Capitata =

Suborder of hydrozoans

Capitata is a suborder of Hydrozoa, a class of marine invertebrates belonging to the phylum Cnidaria.

== Characteristics ==
Members of this suborder are characterised by the tentacles of the polyps terminating in knobs. In some species these are only present in juvenile forms being replaced in adults by more threadlike tentacles. A high nematocyst concentration is present in the knobs. A few species in this group are better known as their solitary medusa form than as their polyp form. These include Sarsia, Polyorchis and Cladonema.

== Families ==
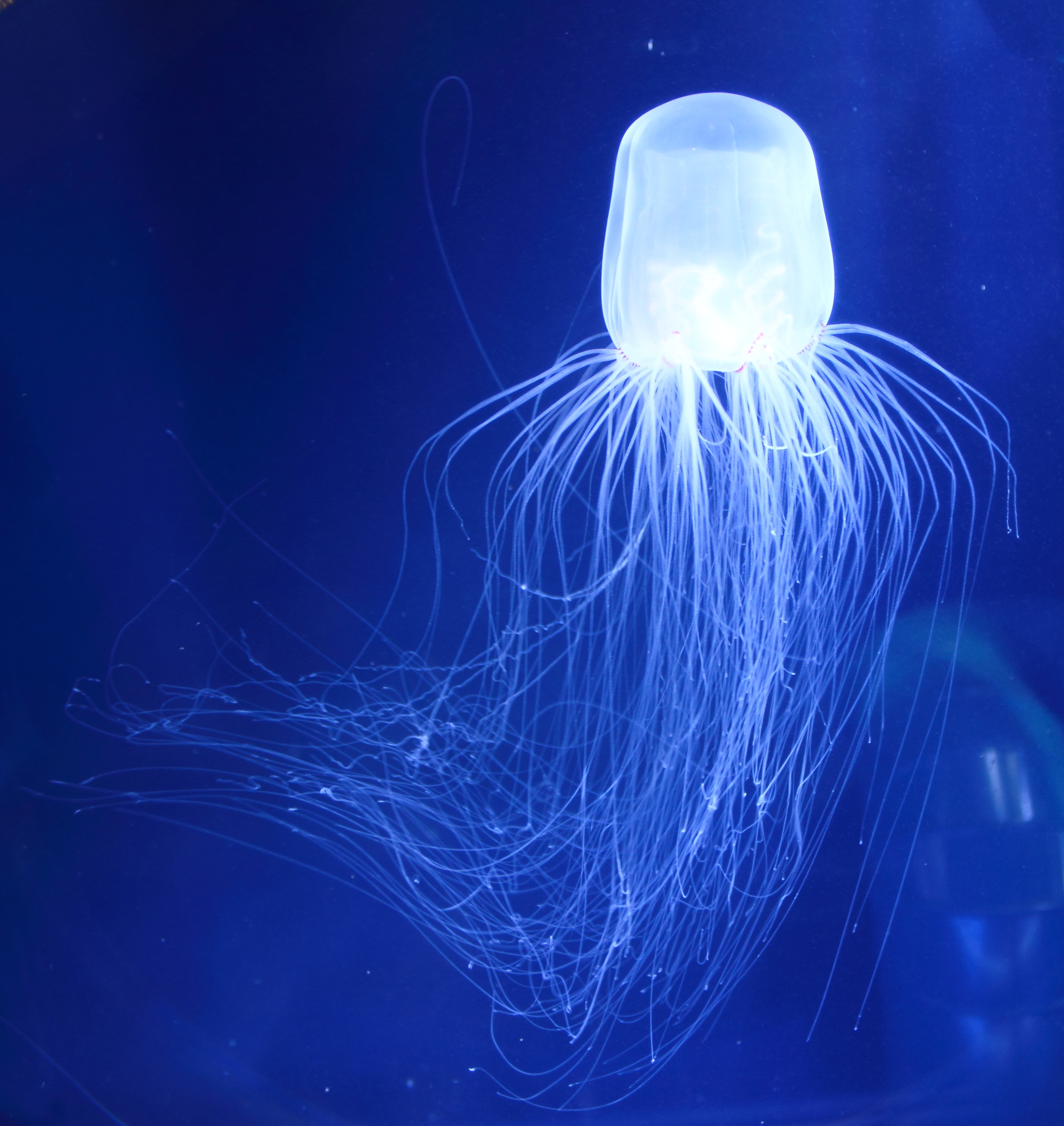
Spirocodon saltatrix

According to the World Register of Marine Species, the following families are found in this suborder :

- Asyncorynidae Kramp, 1949
- Cladocorynidae Allman, 1872
- Cladonematidae Gegenbaur, 1857
- Corynidae Johnston, 1836
- Halimedusidae Arai & Brinckmann-Voss, 1980
- Hydrocorynidae Rees, 1957
- Milleporidae Fleming, 1828
- Moerisiidae Poche, 1914
- Pennariidae McCrady, 1859
- Porpitidae Goldfuss, 1818
- Pseudosolanderiidae Bouillon & Gravier-Bonnet, 1988
- Rosalindidae Bouillon, 1985
- Solanderiidae Marshall, 1892
- Sphaerocorynidae Prévot, 1959
- Teissieridae Bouillon, 1978
- Tricyclusidae Kramp, 1949
- Zancleidae Russell, 1953
- Zancleopsidae Bouillon, 1978
