= Gonophore =

Hydrozoa reproductive organ

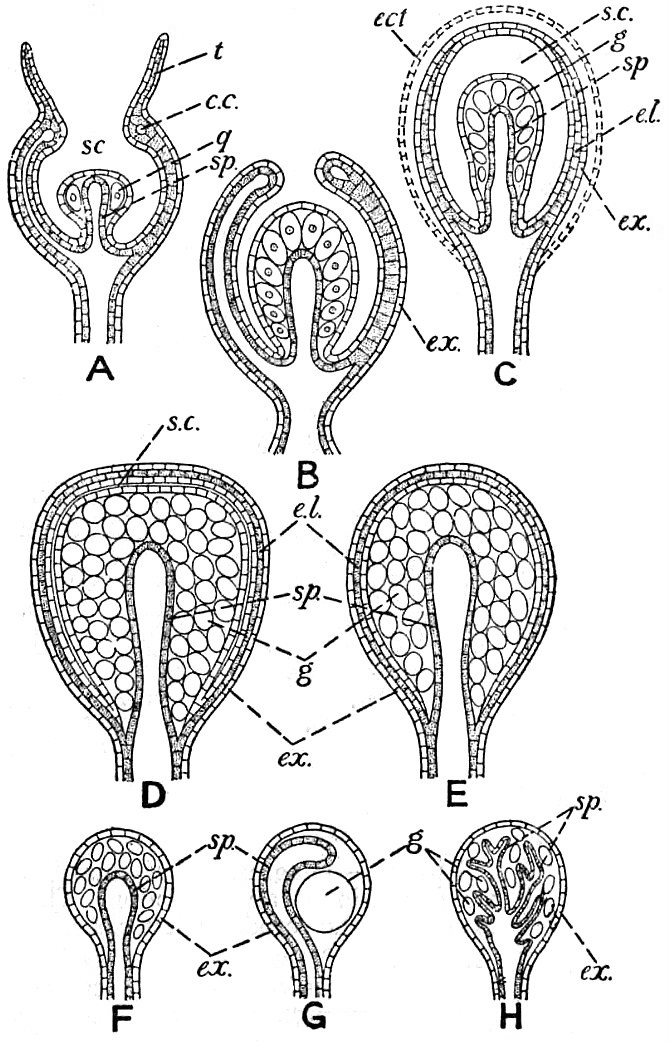
Diagrams of the structure of the gonophores of various Hydromedusae.

A gonophore is a reproductive organ in members of the Hydrozoa (specifically Hydroidolina) which produces gametes. It is a sporosac, a medusa or any intermediate stage. The name is derived from the Greek words γόνος (gónos, "that which produces seed") and -φόρος (-fóros, "-bearing").

Gonophores are borne on branching stalks that grow radially outward from the wall of a hydranth (i.e. the hydroid polyp, bearing a mouth, digestive cavity and tentacles). The germ cells are formed from the inner layer of the entocodon, which is the primordium (i.e. the first cells that give rise to the development of an organ) of the subumbrella (i.e. the concave oral surface of a medusa) in the development of medusae from the gonophore.

== Diversity ==
In the order Leptomedusae, the gonophores are borne on much-reduced hydranths and are usually protected in a peridermal (i.e. belonging to a hydroid perisarc) gonotheca. Medusae forming on fully developed hydranths are extremely rare; usually the gonophores develop into medusae or into sessile sporosacs.

In the superfamily Plumularioidea, they usually occur as fixed sporosacs (i.e. gonophores held in place and not released into the water during larval development). More rarely they are rather reduced medusoids.

In the family Lovenellidae, the gonophores are pedunculate free-roaming medusae.

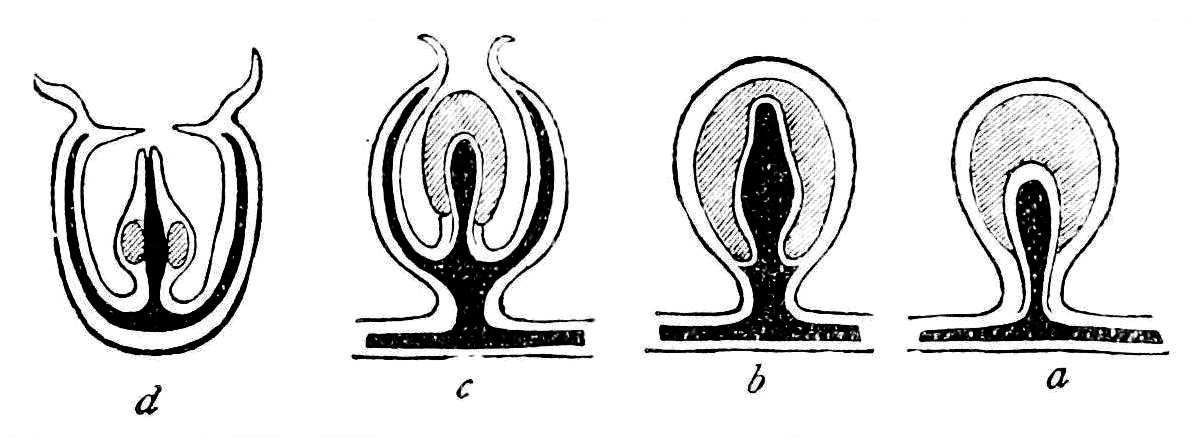
PSM V16 D660 Gonophores of the hydrozoa

In the family Haleciidae, they are typically sporosacs, growing singly or bunched into a glomulus. They remain attached to the hydroids or break off to passively drift away; in a few species, the gonophores are naked.

In the family Sphaerocorynidae, the gonophores are borne singly or on short, branching blastostyles (i.e. the living axial portion of a modified gonangium, from which numerous medusae are budded) between or below tentacles. They develop into free medusae or eumedusoids.

In the family Corynidae, they are borne on hydranths and either liberated as free medusae or retained as medusoids or sessile sporosacs.

In the family Hydrocorynidae, they are borne in clusters on the proximal part of the hydranth body or develop from hydrorhiza (i.e. the stalk of a colony). The gonophores develop into free medusae or sessile sporosacs.

In the family Candelabridae, they are fixed sporosacs. They develop on the aboral part of the hydranth below the tentacle-covered region, either directly on the hydranth or on spindle-shaped blastostyles.

In the family Tubulariidae, they develop above the aboral tentacles and develop into free medusae or fixed sporosacs.

In the family Corymorphidae, they are borne above aboral tentacles, either directly issuing from the hydranth wall or on blastostyles. The gonophores develop into free medusae or fixed sporosacs.

In the family Tricyclusidae, they are fixed sporosacs, with only male specimens observed.

In the family Pennariidae, they develop above the aboral tentacles. They may or may not liberate eumedusoids.

The gonophores in the family Cladocorynidae are carried singly or on short, branched pedicels on the lower or middle part of the hydranth. They develop into free medusae or fixed sporosacs.

The gonophores in the family Solanderiidae, where known, arise directly from coenosarc (i.e. the hollow living tubes of the upright branching individuals of a colony). They are cryptomedusoid or eumedusoid.

In the family Milleporidae, they arise from the coenosarc within chambers embedded entirely in the coenosteum (i.e. the calcareous mass forming the skeleton of a compound coral).

== See also ==
- Gonopod
- Gonopodium
