= Proboscidactyla abyssicola =

Scientific classification
- Domain: Eukaryota
- Kingdom: Animalia
- Phylum: Cnidaria
- Class: Hydrozoa
- Order: Anthoathecata
- Family: Proboscidactylidae
- Genus: Proboscidactyla
- Species: P. abyssicola

Binomial name
- Proboscidactyla abyssicola Uchida, 1948

Species of hydrozoans

Proboscidactyla abyssicola is a species of cnidarians belonging to the order Anthoathecata.

It was first described by Tohru Uchida in 1948.
