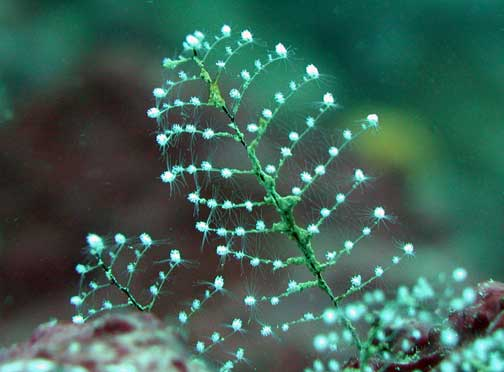

Scientific classification
- Kingdom: Animalia
- Phylum: Cnidaria
- Class: Hydrozoa
- Order: Anthoathecata
- Family: Pennariidae
- Genus: Pennaria
- Species: P. disticha

Binomial name
- Pennaria disticha Goldfuss, 1820

Synonyms
- List: Corydendrium splendidum Boone, 1938; Eucoryne elegans Leidy, 1855; Euphysa globator Leuckart, 1856; Globiceps tiarella Ayres, 1854; Halocordyle cooperi Warren, 1906; Halocordyle disticha (Goldfuss, 1820); Halocordyle disticha var. australis; Halocordyle fragilis Vannucci, 1951; Pennaria adamsia von Lendenfeld, 1885; Pennaria australis Bale, 1884; Pennaria caulini Delle Chiaje, 1841; Pennaria gibbosa L. Agassiz, 1860; Pennaria inornata Brooks, 1883; Pennaria pacifica Clarke, 1907; Pennaria rosea von Lendenfeld, 1885; Pennaria symmetrica Clarke, 1879; Pennaria tiarella (Ayres, 1854)

= Pennaria disticha =

Species of hydrozoan

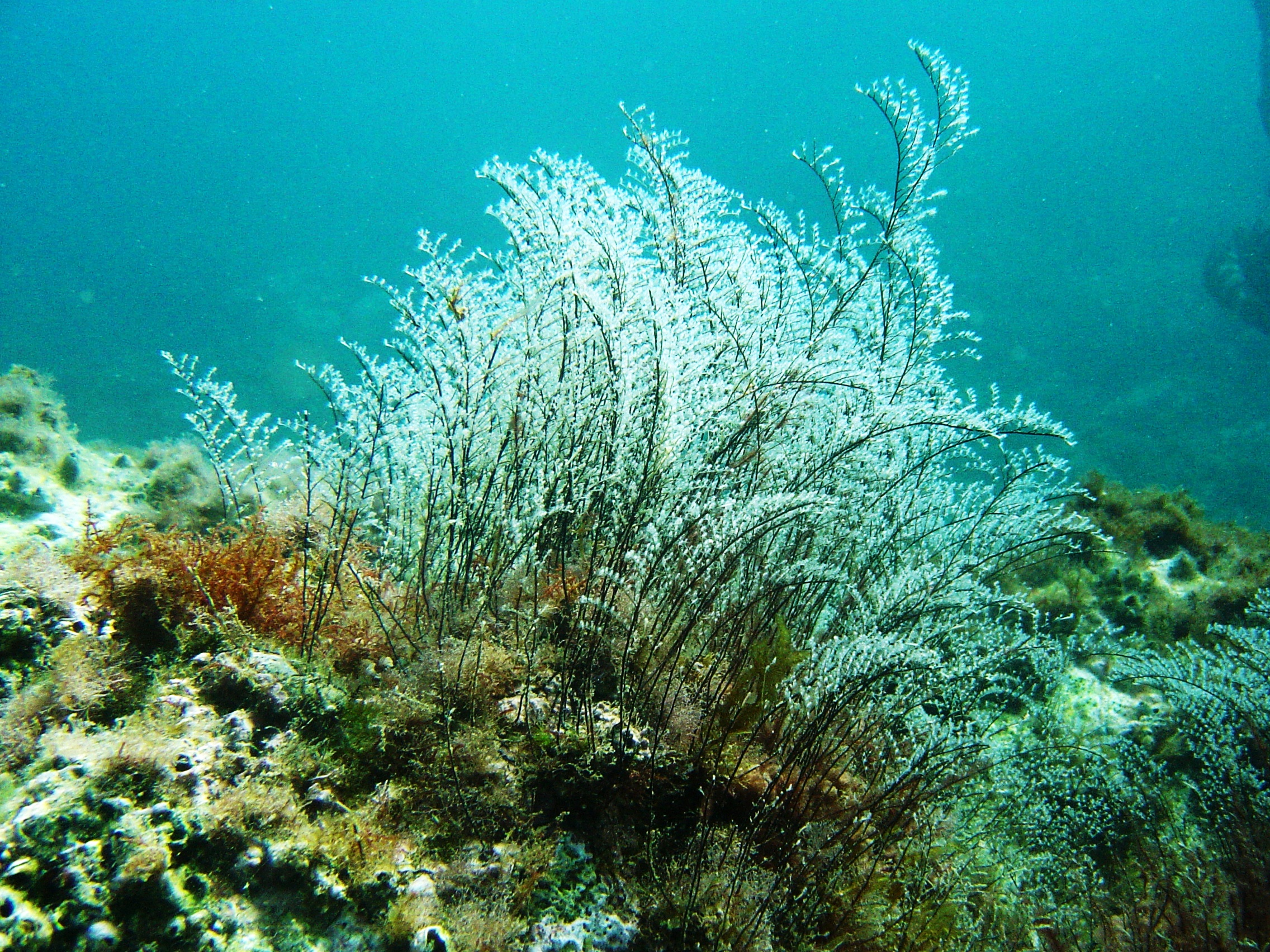
Colony

Pennaria disticha, also known as the Christmas tree hydroid, is a species of athecate hydroid in the family Pennariidae. Colonies are common in the Mediterranean Sea growing on rocks close to the surface. This species has been used in research into prey capture.

== Description ==
Colonies of Pennaria disticha consist of numerous much-branched stems up to 30 cm (12 in) high. The branching system is alternate. The polyps are tiny and are supported by a hydrocaulus, a fairly stiff hollow tube with a perisarc (sheath) made of chitin and protein. This is dark brown or blackish, but is often colonised by algae and diatoms giving it a muddy appearance. The whitish polyps are tinged with red. Each polyp has ten to eighteen slender, filiform tentacles at its base and up to twelve tentacles with knobbed tips surrounding its terminal mouth.

== Distribution ==
Pennaria disticha probably originated in the western Atlantic Ocean but has spread and now is widely distributed in warm waters throughout the world. It was first detected in Hawaii in 1928. It is found in shallow water attached to hard surfaces, on both rocks and man-made structures, in locations with some water movement. On reefs, it tends to be in less-exposed positions and in crevices. This hydrozoan forms part of the community of organisms known as the fouling community, and has spread around the world as a result of man's maritime activities.

== Ecology ==
The polyps of Pennaria disticha spread out their tentacles to catch any small zooplankton that float by. The prey is often captured and immobilised by nematocysts on the threadlike tentacles at the base of the polyp. The crown bends over to receive the item, which is then killed by the more powerful nematocysts at the tip of the crown tentacles and thrust into the mouth.

The colony grows by budding, during which process new feeding polyps are formed. Reproduction is by the budding of reproductive polyps known as gonophores, the medusa stage in the life cycle. Gonophores may remain attached to the parent colony, but usually become detached. Each colony produces gonophores of one sex. Male gonophores soon eject white sperm into the water and females emit up to six eggs. After fertilisation, each embryo develops within a day or so into a free-swimming planula larva. After drifting with the plankton for some time, this finds a suitable hard surface on which to settle and start a new colony.

== Toxicity ==
It has been reported that an acute, painful dermatitis occurred in several people who came into contact with a rope on which Pennaria disticha was growing as a fouling organism.
