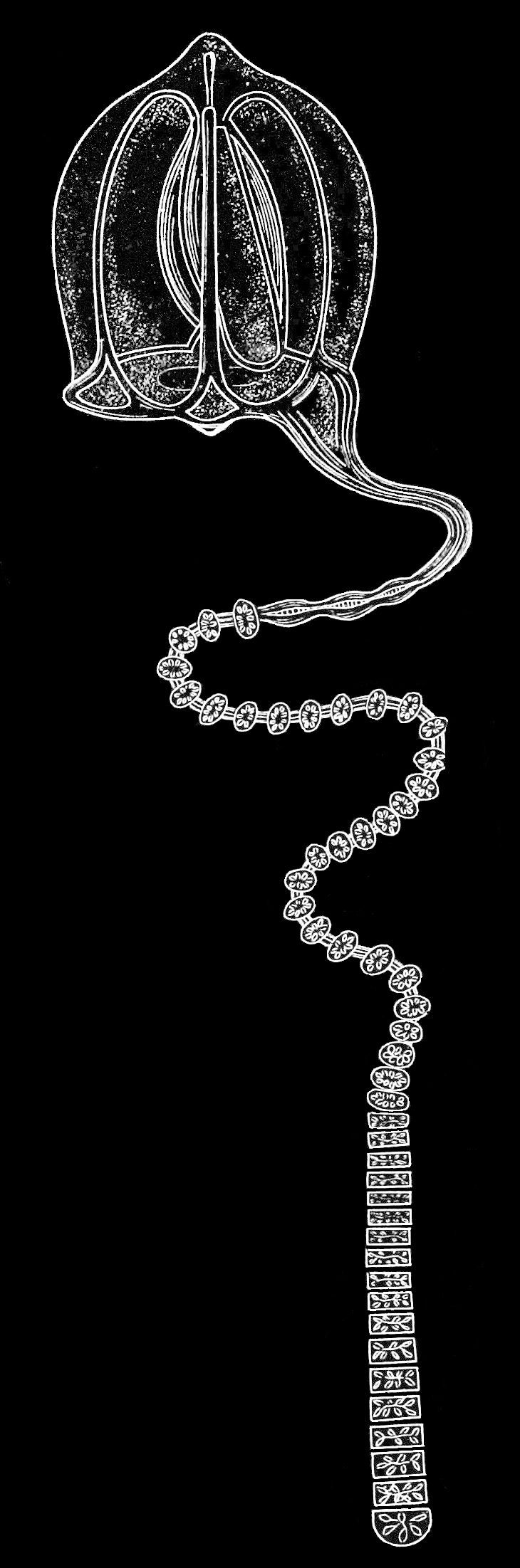

Scientific classification
- Domain: Eukaryota
- Kingdom: Animalia
- Phylum: Cnidaria
- Class: Hydrozoa
- Order: Anthoathecata
- Family: Corymorpha
- Species: C. nutans

Binomial name
- Corymorpha nutans M. Sars, 1835

= Corymorpha nutans =

Species of hydrozoan

Corymorpha nutans is a hydroid in the family Corymorphidae.

== Description ==
This hydroid consists of a single polyp on a tapering stalk which arises from sand or gravel. The colouration is translucent white or pale pink and the stem has pale lines that run longitudinally from the base to where it joins the polyp. The polyp size is relatively large and bends over towards one side, this feature is responsible for the hydroid's name (nutans is Latin for nodding). Typically there are 30 to 40 long, thin tentacles surrounding approximately 80 shorter, finer ones. Overall height 80-100mm, diameter of the polyp and tentacles about 20mm.

== Distribution ==
Corymorpha nutans is found throughout the British Isles and is frequent in suitable habitats in the Northern Atlantic and south to the Mediterranean Sea.
