= Steenstrupia =

Steenstrupia may refer to:

- Steenstrupia, a genus of hydrozoans in the family Corymorphidae, synonym of Corymorpha
- Steenstrupia, a genus of cephalopods in the family Architeuthidae, synonym of Architeuthis
- Steenstrupia (journal), a scientific journal merged into the European Journal of Taxonomy
