= Acaulis =

Scientific classification
- Kingdom: Animalia
- Phylum: Cnidaria
- Class: Hydrozoa
- Order: Anthoathecata
- Family: Acaulidae
- Genus: Acaulis; Stimpson, 1853
- Species: A. primarius

Binomial name
- Acaulis primarius Stimpson, 1853

Species of hydrozoans

Acaulis is a genus of hydrozoans that typically lives in polar environments but is known to have been observed in subtropical and boreal regions. Its only species is Acaulis primarius. They are said to range in depth from 20 to 350 metres (70 to 1,150 ft) below sea level, and also reproduce asexually.
