= Paulinum =

Paulinum may refer to:

- Paulinum (cnidarian), a genus of hydrozoans in the order Anthoathecata, family unassigned
- Paulinum (University of Leipzig), university building of University of Leipzig
- Paulinum Theological Seminary, Windhoek, Namibia
