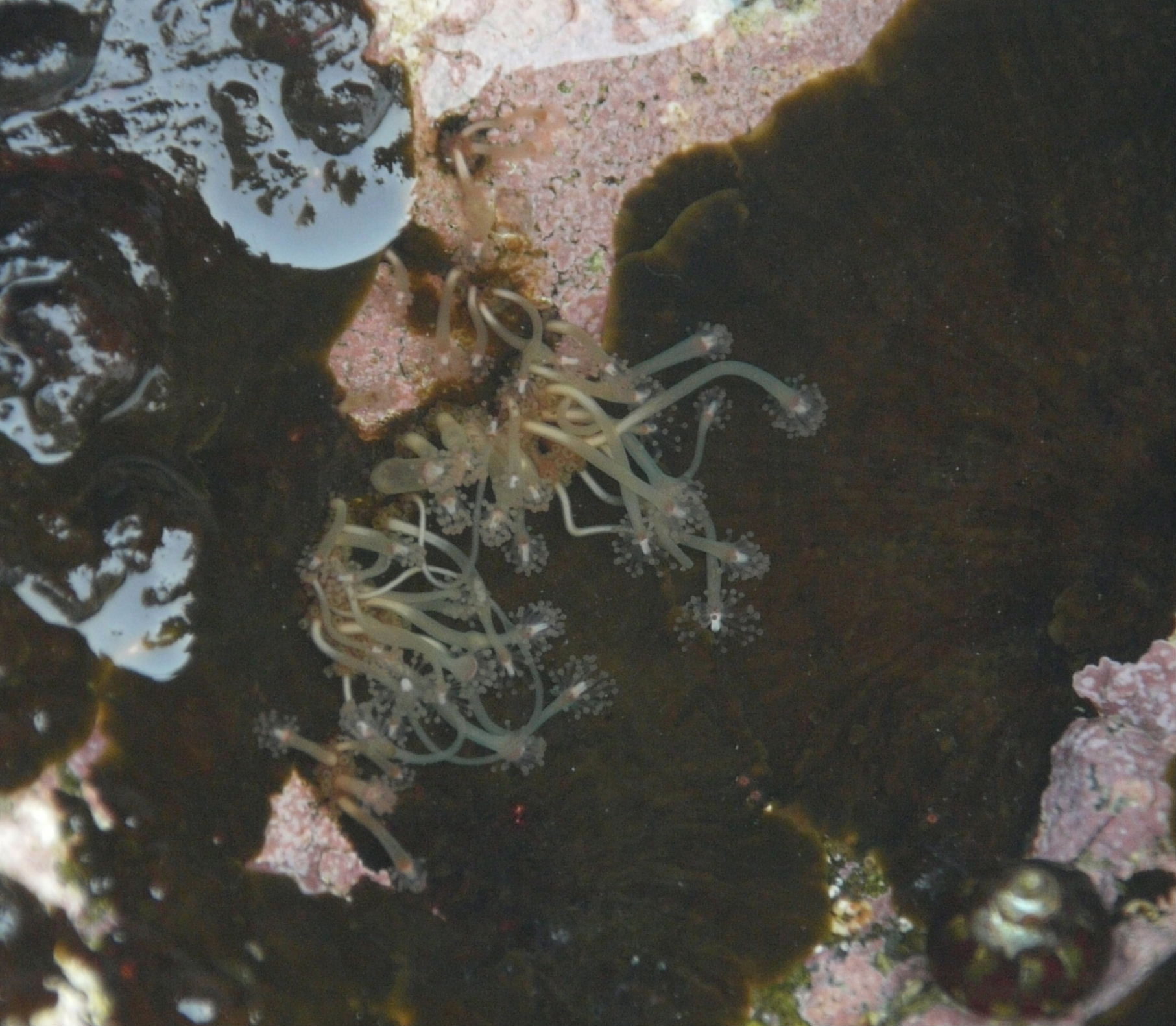
- Hydrocoryne miurensis

Scientific classification
- Domain: Eukaryota
- Kingdom: Animalia
- Phylum: Cnidaria
- Class: Hydrozoa
- Order: Anthoathecata
- Family: Hydrocorynidae
- Genus: Hydrocoryne; Stechow, 1908

= Hydrocoryne =

Genus of cnidarians

Hydrocoryne is a genus of cnidarians belonging to the family Hydrocorynidae.

The species of this genus are found in Japan and Northern America.

Species:

- Hydrocoryne bodegensis Rees, Hand & Mills, 1976
- Hydrocoryne condensa Xu & D.u.Huang, 2013
- Hydrocoryne iemanja Morandini, Stampar, Migotto & Marques, 2009
- Hydrocoryne longitentaculata Xu, Huang & Guo, 2019
- Hydrocoryne macrogastera Xu & Huang, 2006
- Hydrocoryne miurensis Stechow, 1908
