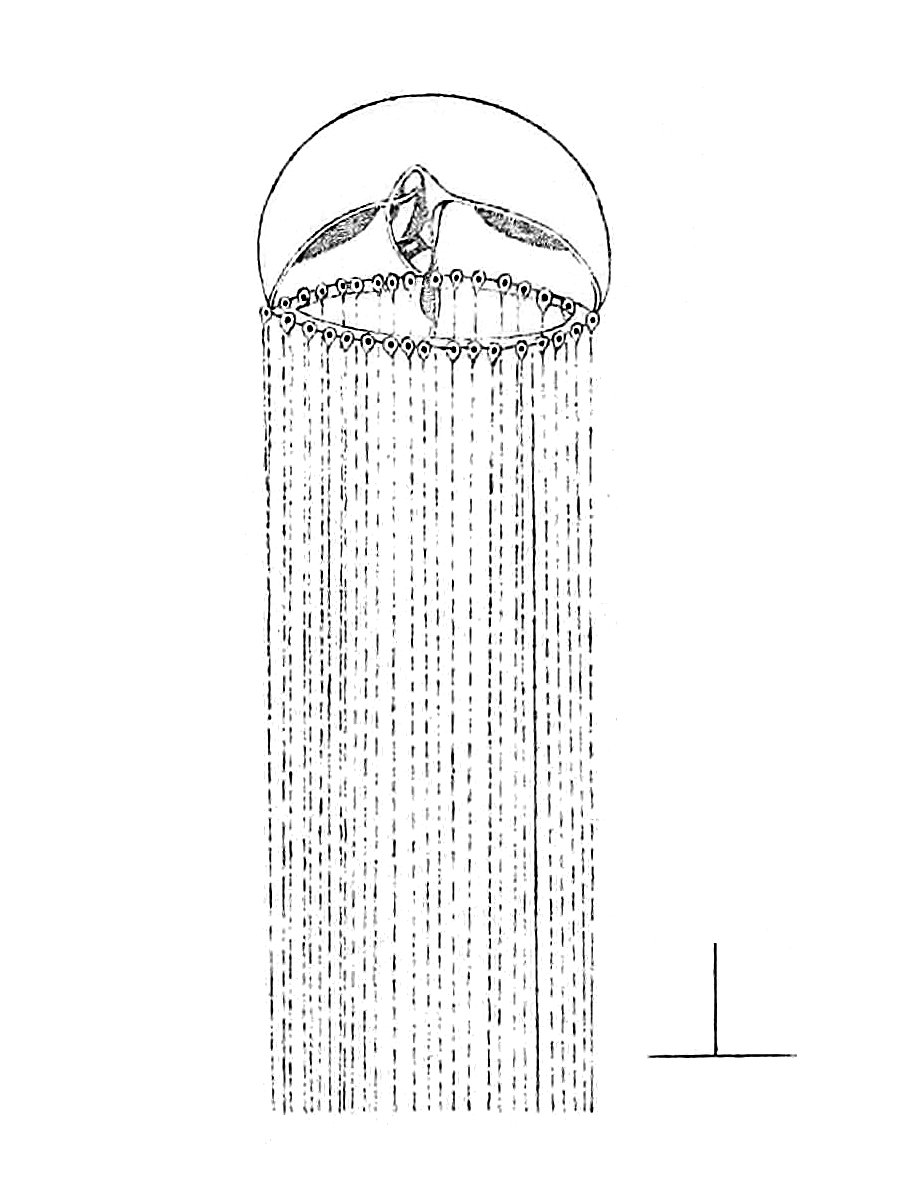

Scientific classification
- Domain: Eukaryota
- Kingdom: Animalia
- Phylum: Cnidaria
- Class: Hydrozoa
- Order: Anthoathecata
- Family: Moerisiidae
- Genus: Odessia; Paspalew, 1937

= Odessia =

Genus of cnidarians

Odessia is a genus of cnidarians belonging to the family Moerisiidae.

The species of this genus are found in Europe.

Species:

- Odessia maeotica (Ostroumoff, 1896)
- Odessia microtentaculata Xu, Huang & Chen, 1991
