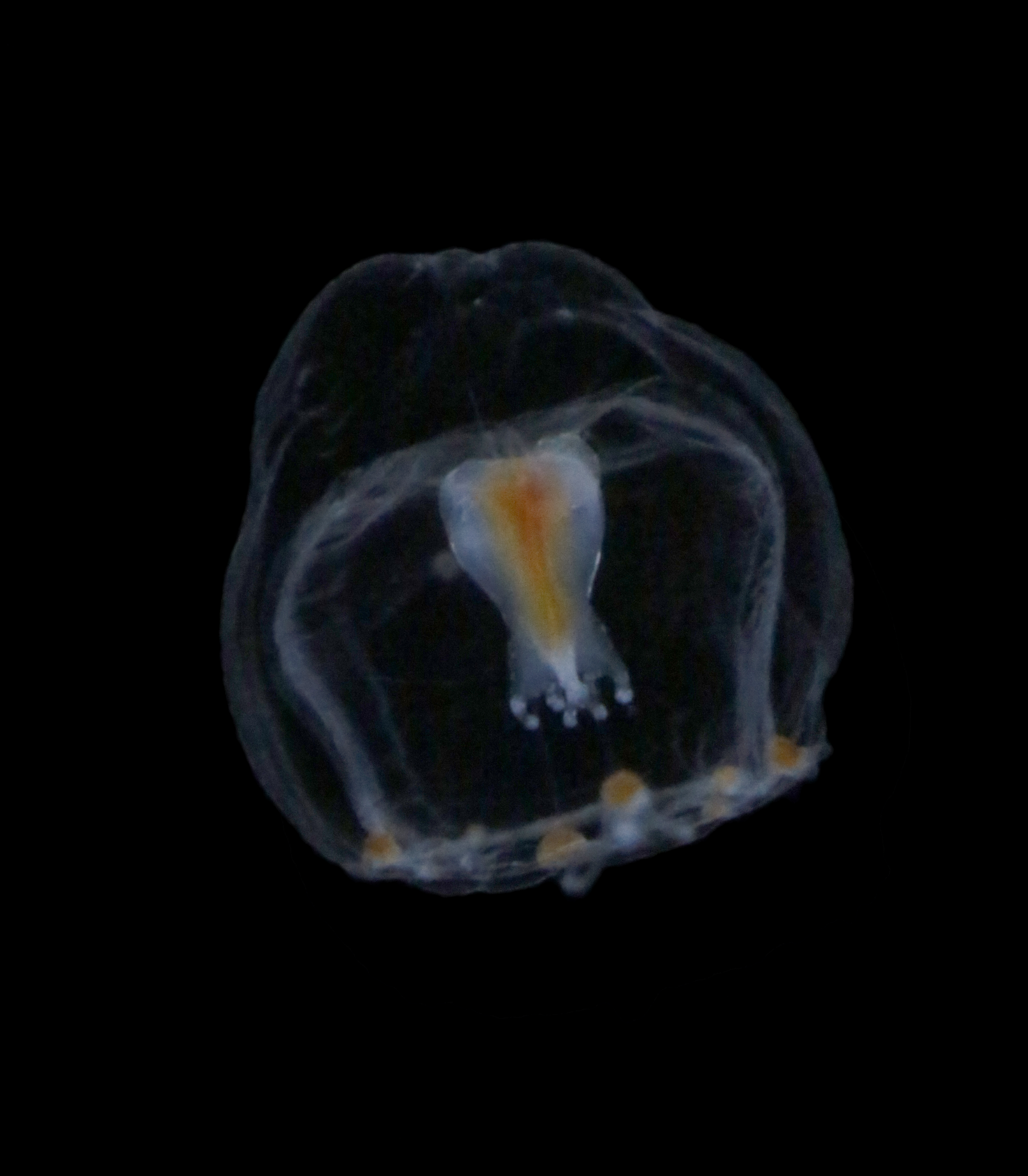
- Rathkea octopunctata

Scientific classification
- Domain: Eukaryota
- Kingdom: Animalia
- Phylum: Cnidaria
- Class: Hydrozoa
- Order: Anthoathecata
- Family: Rathkeidae
- Genus: Rathkea; Brandt, 1837

= Rathkea =

Genus of aquatic animals

Rathkea is a genus of cnidarians belonging to the family Rathkeidae.

The species of this genus are found in Europe, Northern Russia and Northern America.

Species:

- Rathkea africana Kramp, 1957
- Rathkea antarctica Uchida, 1971
- Rathkea formosissima (Browne, 1902)
- Rathkea hyalina (van Beneden, 1867)
- Rathkea lizzioides O'Sullivan, 1984
- Rathkea octopunctata (Sars, 1835)
- Rathkea rubence Nair, 1951
