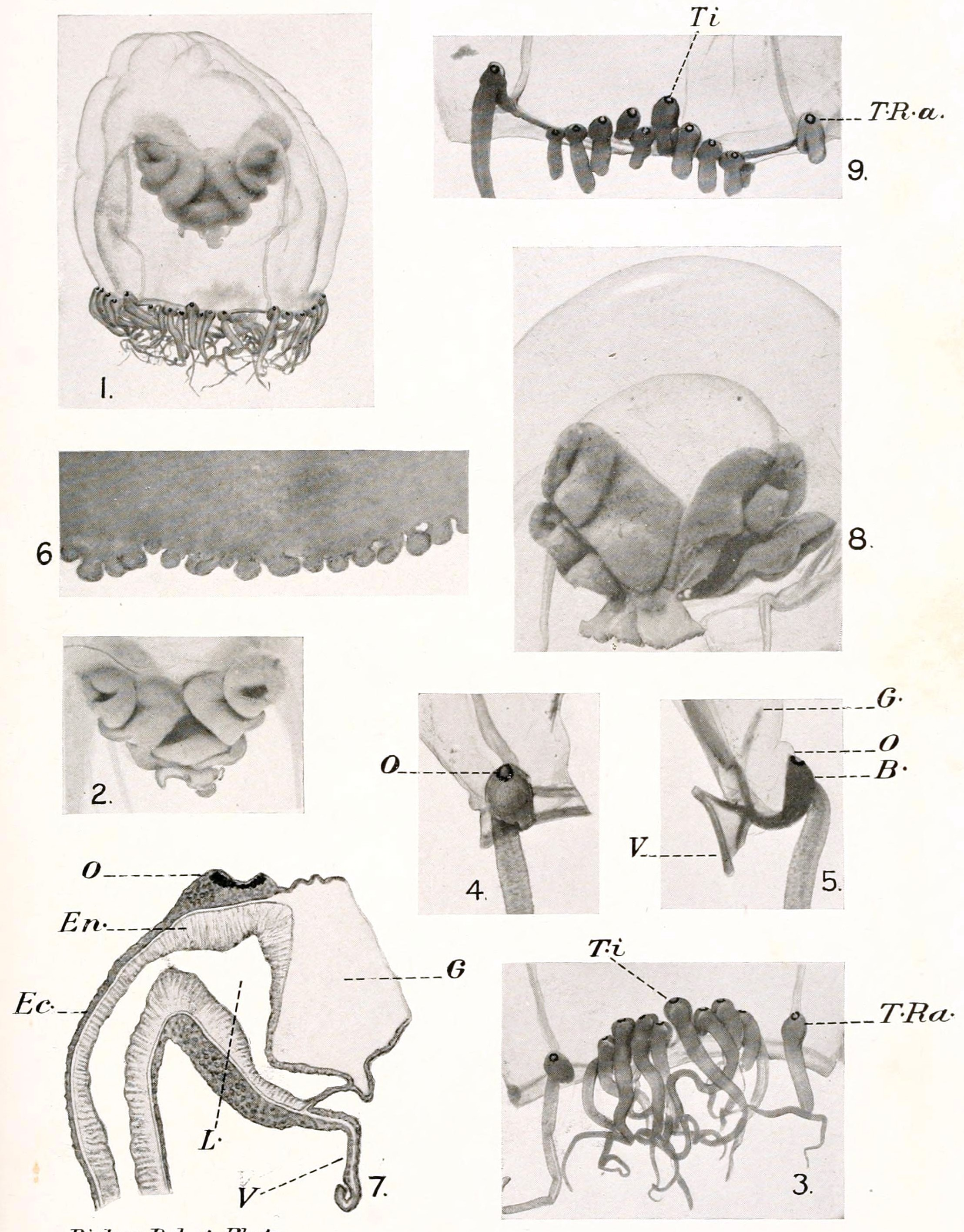
- Illustrations of Halimedusa typus from 1916

Scientific classification
- Kingdom: Animalia
- Phylum: Cnidaria
- Class: Hydrozoa
- Order: Anthoathecata
- Family: Halimedusidae
- Genus: Halimedusa; Bigelow, 1916
- Species: H. typus

Binomial name
- Halimedusa typus Bigelow, 1916

= Halimedusa =

Genus of hydrozoans

Halimedusa is a monotypic genus of hydrozoans belonging to the family Halimedusidae. The only species is Halimedusa typus.

The species is found in Northern America.
