= Australomedusa =

Scientific classification
- Domain: Eukaryota
- Kingdom: Animalia
- Phylum: Cnidaria
- Class: Hydrozoa
- Order: Anthoathecata
- Family: Australomedusidae
- Genus: Australomedusa; Russell, 1970

Genus of cnidarians

Australomedusa is a genus of hydrozoans belonging to the family Australomedusidae.

The species of this genus are found in Southern Australia.

Species:

- Australomedusa baylii Russell, 1970
- Australomedusa thrombolites Zeidler & Gershwin, 2004
