= Sphaerocoryne =

Sphaerocoryne may refer to:

- Sphaerocoryne (cnidarian), a genus of cnidarians in the family Sphaerocorynidae
- Sphaerocoryne (plant), a genus of plants in the family Annonaceae
