= Microstoma =

Microstoma (Greek "small mouth") may refer to genera:

- Microstoma (fish)
- Microstoma (fungus)
- Microstoma, a genus of hydrozoans in the family Pteronemidae, synonym of Pteronema
