= Protohydra =

Scientific classification
- Kingdom: Animalia
- Phylum: Cnidaria
- Class: Hydrozoa
- Order: Anthoathecata
- Family: Protohydridae
- Genus: Protohydra; Greeff, 1869

Genus of aquatic animals

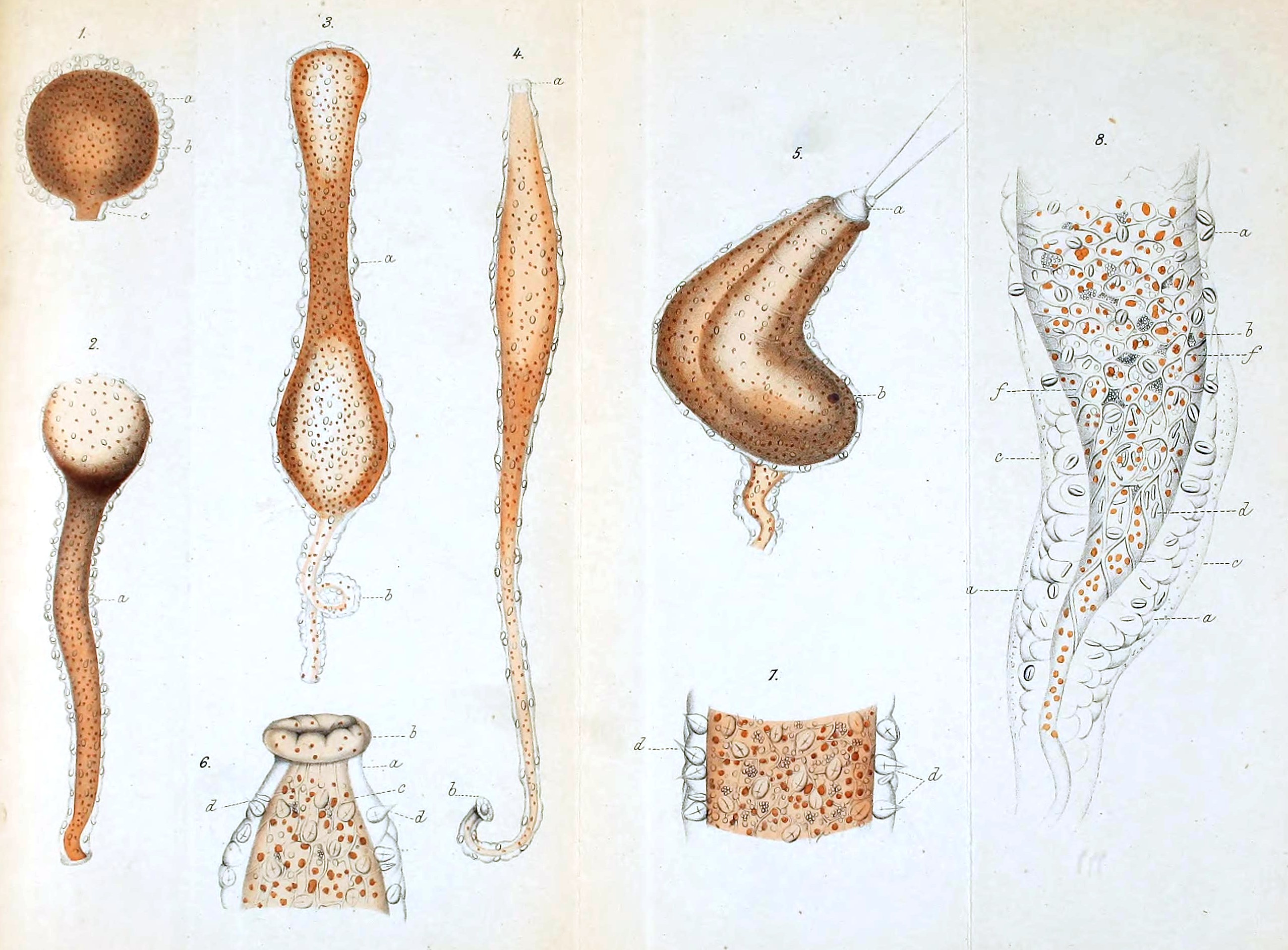
Protohydra leuckarti

Protohydra is a genus of cnidarians belonging to the family Protohydridae.

The species of this genus are found in Europe and Northern America.

Species:

- Protohydra caulleryi Dawydoff, 1930
- Protohydra leuckarti Greeff, 1870
