= Similiclava =

Scientific classification
- Kingdom: Animalia
- Phylum: Cnidaria
- Class: Hydrozoa
- Order: Anthoathecata
- Suborder: Filifera
- Family: Similiclavidae; Calder, Choong & McDaniel, 2015
- Genus: Similiclava; Calder, Choong & McDaniel, 2015
- Species: S. nivea

Binomial name
- Similiclava nivea Calder, Choong & McDaniel, 2015

Genus of hydrozoans

Similiclava is a monotypic genus of cnidarians belonging to the monotypic family Similiclavidae. The only species is Similiclava nivea.

The species is found in Northern America.
