= Zhangiella =

Scientific classification
- Kingdom: Animalia
- Phylum: Cnidaria
- Class: Hydrozoa
- Order: Anthoathecata
- Family: Australomedusidae
- Genus: Zhangiella; Bouillon, Gravili, Pages, Gili & Boero, 2006

Genus of cnidarians

Zhangiella is a genus of hydrozoans belonging to the family Australomedusidae.

Species:

- Zhangiella bitentaculata (Xu, Huang & Chen, 1991)
- Zhangiella condensum Huang, Zhang & Sun, 2020
- Zhangiella dongshanensis (Xu & Huang, 1994)
- Zhangiella nanhainense (Zhang, 1982)
