= Euphysa =

Scientific classification
- Domain: Eukaryota
- Kingdom: Animalia
- Phylum: Cnidaria
- Class: Hydrozoa
- Order: Anthoathecata
- Family: Corymorphidae
- Genus: Euphysa; Forbes, 1848

Genus of aquatic animals

Euphysa is a genus of hydrozoans belonging to the family Corymorphidae.

The genus has cosmopolitan distribution.

Species:

- Euphysa aurata Forbes, 1848
- Euphysa australis von Lendenfeld, 1885
- Euphysa brevia (Uchida, 1947)
