= Proboscidactyla =

Scientific classification
- Kingdom: Animalia
- Phylum: Cnidaria
- Class: Hydrozoa
- Order: Anthoathecata
- Family: Proboscidactylidae
- Genus: Proboscidactyla; Brandt, 1835

Genus of hydrozoans

Proboscidactyla is a genus of cnidarians belonging to the order Anthoathecata.

It was first described by Johann Friedrich von Brandt in 1835.

== Species ==
Species accepted by WoRMs:

- Proboscidactyla abyssicola Uchida, 1948
- Proboscidactyla circumsabella Hand, 1954
- Proboscidactyla flavicirrata Brandt, 1835
- Proboscidactyla gemmifera (Fewkes, 1882)
- Proboscidactyla menoni Pagès, Bouillon & Gili, 1991
- Proboscidactyla mutabilis (Browne, 1902)
- Proboscidactyla occidentalis (Fewkes, 1889)
- Proboscidactyla ornata (McCrady, 1859)
- Proboscidactyla stellata (Forbes, 1846)
- Proboscidactyla trifurcata Xu, Huang & Guo, 2019
- Proboscidactyla tropica Browne, 1905
