= Teissieridae =

Scientific classification
- Kingdom: Animalia
- Phylum: Cnidaria
- Class: Hydrozoa
- Order: Anthoathecata
- Family: Teissieridae

Family of cnidarians

Teissieridae is a family of cnidarians belonging to the order Anthoathecata.

Genera:

- Pseudosolanderia Bouillon & Gravier-Bonnet, 1988
- Teissiera Bouillon, 1974
