= Rosalindidae =

Scientific classification
- Kingdom: Animalia
- Phylum: Cnidaria
- Class: Hydrozoa
- Order: Anthoathecata
- Family: Rosalindidae

Family of hydrozoans

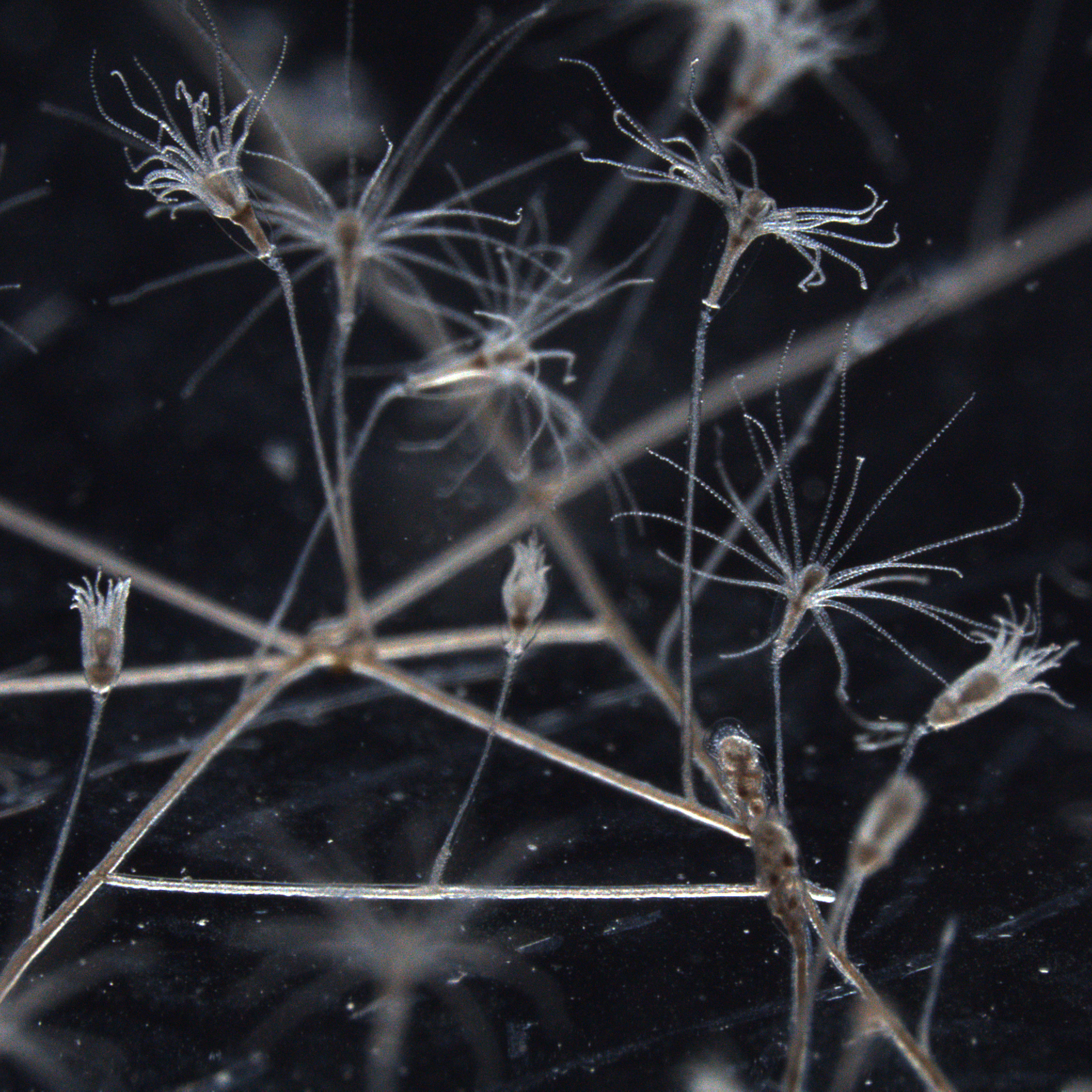
A colony of hydrozoans characterized by their feathery appearance and ability to attach to other substrates.

Rosalindidae is a family of cnidarians belonging to the order Anthoathecata.

== Description ==
Rosalindidae are hydrozoans that are characterized by their ability to form colonies of polyps and attach to various surfaces, such as seaweed and shells, in the ocean. Rosalindidae are classified as invertebrates. They are considered epibionts, which rely on other invertebrates to live and develop. Although hydroids like Rosalindidae typically live on hard substrates and among coral rubble, as well as colonize scleractinia, researchers have found Rosalindidae growing on larger animal hosts such as Cladocarpus paradiseus hydroids. Rosalindidae form monomorphic colonies (monomorphism) in contrast to the polymorphic colonies (polymorphism) that characterize other hydrozoan families.

Rosalindidae make up the order Anthoathecata – a hydroid group generally known for its fragility due to the lack of a perisarc to protect its gonophores and hydranths. However, colonies of polyps that fall under the genus Rosalinda possess a perisarcal skeleton composed of hydranths with several tentacles covering the body. Rosalinda was also reported having cnidocytes composed of stenoteles and mastigophores.

== Distribution ==
Rosalindidae are globally distributed. They have been reported in the Northeast and Northwest Atlantic Ocean, the Central Eastern Atlantic off the African coast, the Northwestern Pacific Ocean, the Bass Strait off Australia, the Western Mediterranean Sea, and the Gulf of Mexico.

Between 2001-2005, many species of the family Rosalindidae were discovered off the Southeastern U.S. coast, near the east coasts of North Carolina and Florida. Rosalindidae were spotted growing in deep-coral ecosystems in these oceanic areas, ranging from the deep-neritic to bathyal zones. One species, Rosalinda incrustans, inhabited the northern Gulf of Mexico, but this same species was also found growing in the Northeastern Atlantic and Western Mediterranean Sea. Another Rosalinda colony was discovered attached to a different hydroid colony - Cladocarpus paradiseus - on the Jacksonville lithoherms at 595 m deep. This is the first time that researchers have observed this phenomenon.

Other species of the Genus Rosalinda were discovered in the Bay of Biscay at approximately 440 m deep. Rosalinda williami was spotted in the Northeastern Atlantic. Rosalinda marlina was reported in shallow waters near Australia. Species of the Genus Rosalinda have also been found in the Northwestern Pacific Ocean. Rosalinda naumovi was identified in the shallower waters of the Northwestern Pacific while another unidentified species was discovered in Sagami Bay, Japan.

One research expedition discovered Rosalindidae species among coral mounds near the West African coast. These species were found growing on bivalves (Bivalvia). Near Northern Angola, Rosalinda nowaldi colonized the bivalve Acesta angolensis. Off the coast of Mauritania, Rosalinda lundalvi inhabited the bivalve Acesta excavata.

== Reproduction ==
Rosalindidae species that have been discovered thus far release planula larvae. However, further research needs to be conducted to determine whether Rosalindidae exhibit a medusa, or adult stage, of life. Rosalindidae are generally known to be sexually reproductive.

== Diet ==
Rosalindidae are part of a larger group of hydrozoans, which consume phytoplankton, zooplankton, and tiny suspended particles using their tentacles. Little is known about the specific diet of Rosalindidae.

== Movement ==
Much of the research on Rosalindidae focuses on their polyp form. In this stage, these hydrozoans are sedentary, relying on other hard substrates and hydrozoans to attach and assemble themselves. One Rosalindidae species, Rosalinda incrustans, was found colonizing a spider crab (Anamathia rissoana).
