= Protohydridae =

Scientific classification
- Kingdom: Animalia
- Phylum: Cnidaria
- Class: Hydrozoa
- Order: Anthoathecata
- Suborder: Aplanulata
- Family: Protohydridae

Family of hydrozoans

Protohydridae is a family of cnidarians belonging to the order Anthoathecata.

Genera:

- Protohydra Greeff, 1869
- Sympagohydra Piraino, Bluhm, Gradinger & Boero, 2008
