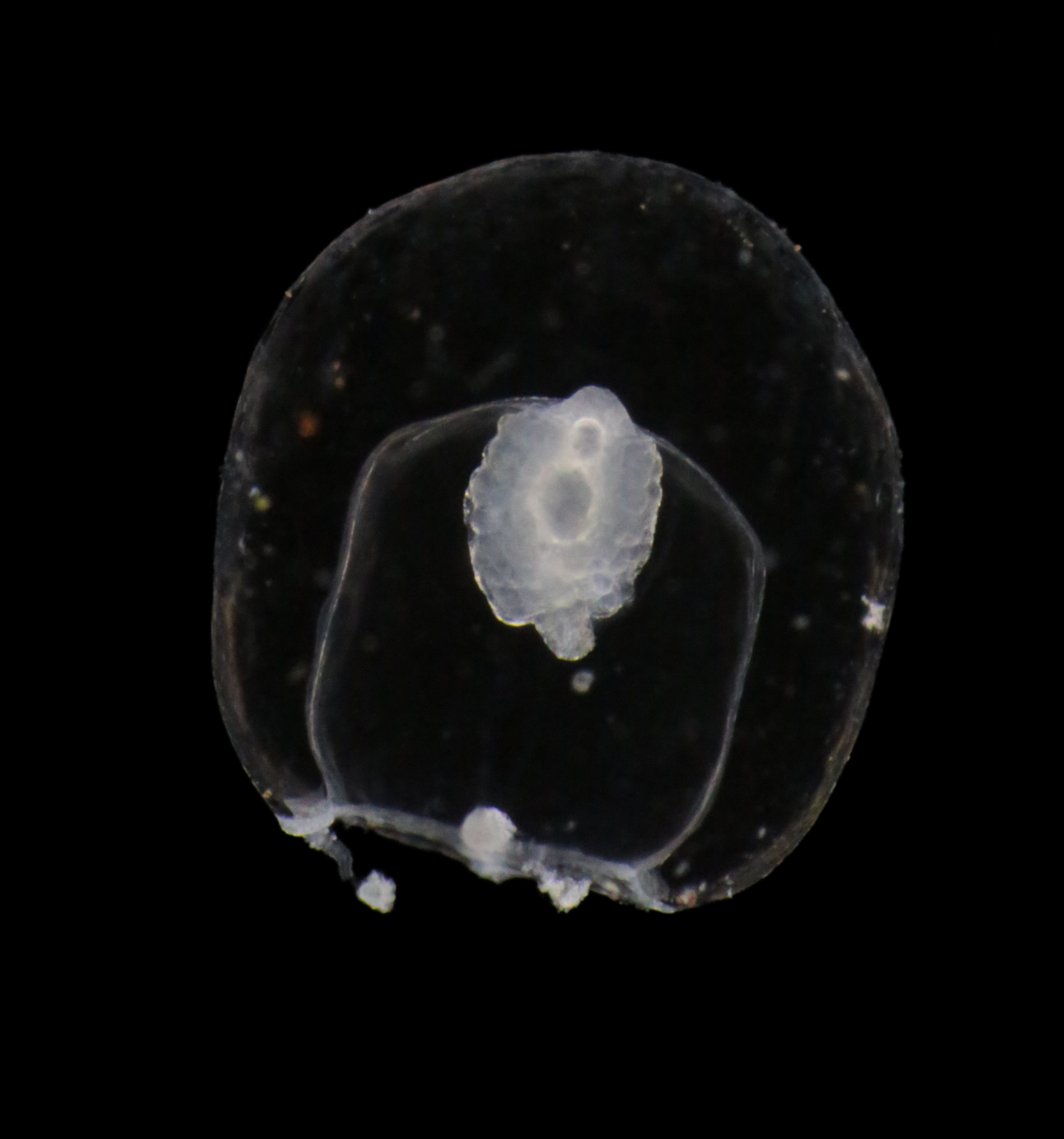
- Plotocnide borealis

Scientific classification
- Kingdom: Animalia
- Phylum: Cnidaria
- Class: Hydrozoa
- Order: Anthoathecata
- Family: Boreohydridae
- Genus: Plotocnide; Wagner, 1885

= Plotocnide =

Genus of aquatic animals

Plotocnide is a genus of cnidarians belonging to the family Boreohydridae.

The species of this genus are found in Europe and Northern America.

Species:

- Plotocnide borealis Wagner, 1885
- Plotocnide taiwanensis Huang & Guo, 2010
