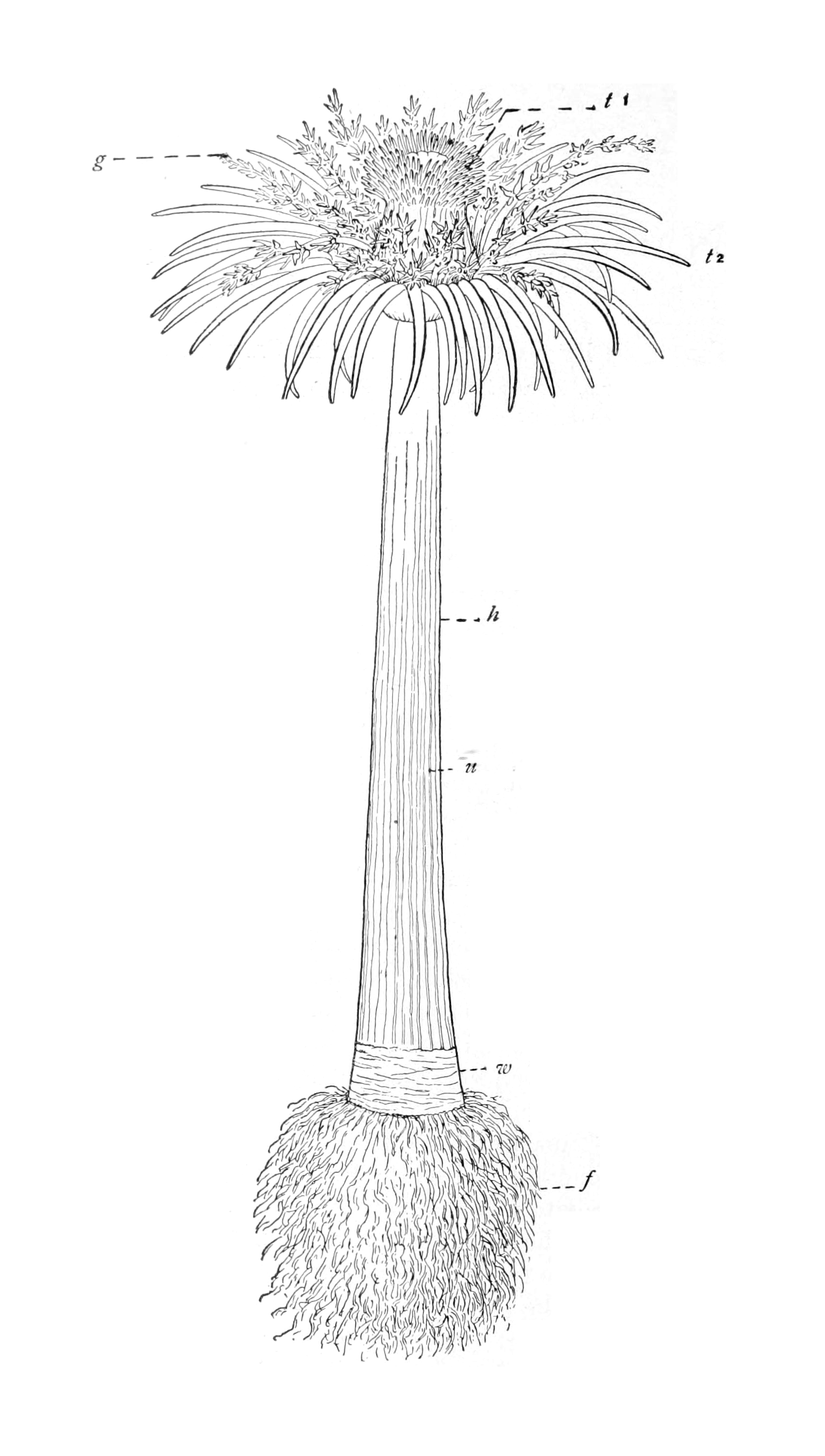
- Corymorpha carnea

Scientific classification
- Kingdom: Animalia
- Phylum: Cnidaria
- Class: Hydrozoa
- Order: Anthoathecata
- Family: Corymorphidae
- Genus: Corymorpha; M. Sars, 1835

= Corymorpha =

Genus of hydrozoans

Corymorpha is a genus of hydrozoans in the family Corymorphidae.

== Species ==
The genus contains the following species:

- Corymorpha abaxialis (Kramp, 1962)
- Corymorpha annulata (Kramp, 1928)
- Corymorpha anthoformis (Yamada, Konno & Kubota, 1974)
- Corymorpha apiciloculifera (Xu & Huang, 2003)
- Corymorpha bigelowi (Maas, 1905)
- Corymorpha brunnescentis (Huang, 1999)
- Corymorpha cargoi (Vargas-Hernandez & Ochoa-Figueroa, 1991)
- Corymorpha carnea (Clark, 1876)
- Corymorpha crassocanalis (Xu & Huang, 2003)
- Corymorpha forbesii (Mayer, 1894)
- Corymorpha fujianensis (Xu & Huang, 2006)
- Corymorpha furcata (Kramp, 1948)
- Corymorpha gemmifera (Bouillon, 1978)
- Corymorpha gigantea (Kramp, 1957)
- Corymorpha glacialis M. Sars, 1860
- Corymorpha gracilis (Brooks, 1883)
- Corymorpha groenlandica (Allman, 1876)
- Corymorpha interogona (Xu & Huang, 2003)
- Corymorpha januarii Steenstrup, 1855
- Corymorpha juliephillipsi (Gershwin, Zeidler & Davie, 2010)
- Corymorpha knides (Huang, 1999)
- Corymorpha macrobulbus (Xu & Huang, 2003)
- Corymorpha meijiensis (Xu, Huang & Guo, 2013)
- Corymorpha microrhiza (Hickson & Gravely, 1907)
- Corymorpha multiknoba (Xu, Huang & Guo, 2014)
- Corymorpha nana Alder, 1857
- Corymorpha nanhainesis (Huang, Xu & Ling, 2012)
- Corymorpha normani (Browne, 1916)
- Corymorpha nutans M. Sars, 1835
- Corymorpha palma Torrey, 1902
- Corymorpha pendula L. Agassiz, 1862
- Corymorpha pileiformis (Xu, Huang & Guo, 2014)
- Corymorpha pseudoabaxialis (Bouillon, 1978)
- Corymorpha rubicincta Watson, 2008
- Corymorpha russelli (Hamond, 1974)
- Corymorpha sagamina Hirohito, 1988
- Corymorpha sarsii Steenstrup, 1855
- Corymorpha similis (Kramp, 1959)
- Corymorpha solidonema (Huang, 1999)
- Corymorpha symmetrica Hargitt, 1924
- Corymorpha taiwanensis (Xu & Huang, 2003)
- Corymorpha typica (Uchida, 1927)
- Corymorpha uvularis (Fraser, 1943)
- Corymorpha vacuola (Xu, Huang & Guo, 2012)
- Corymorpha valdiviae (Vanhöffen, 1911)
- Corymorpha verrucosa (Bouillon, 1978)
