= Trichydra =

Scientific classification
- Kingdom: Animalia
- Phylum: Cnidaria
- Class: Hydrozoa
- Order: Anthoathecata
- Suborder: Filifera
- Family: Trichydridae; Hincks, 1868
- Genus: Trichydra; Wright, 1858
- Species: T. pudica

Binomial name
- Trichydra pudica Wright, 1857

Genus of hydrozoans

Trichydra is a monotypic genus of cnidarians belonging to the monotypic family Trichydridae. The only species is Trichydra pudica.

The species is found in Europe and Northern America.
