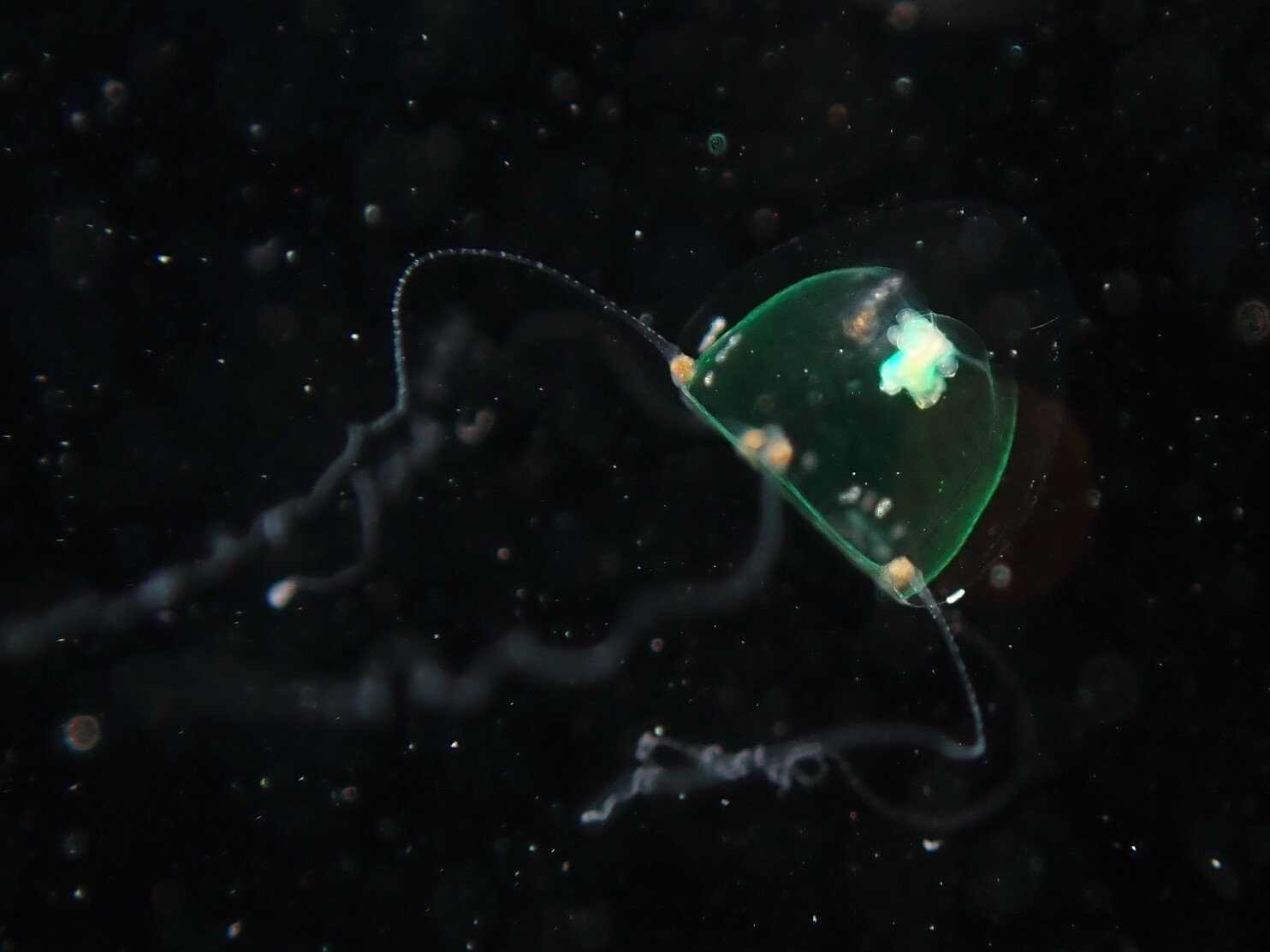
- Podocorynoides minima

Scientific classification
- Kingdom: Animalia
- Phylum: Cnidaria
- Class: Hydrozoa
- Order: Anthoathecata
- Suborder: Filifera
- Family: Rathkeidae; Russell, 1953

Synonyms
- Lizziinae Russell, 1953

= Rathkeidae =

Family of hydrozoans

Rathkeidae is a family of cnidarians belonging to the order Anthoathecata.

Genera:

- Allorathkea Schmidt, 1972
- Lizzia Forbes, 1846
- Podocorynoides Schuchert, 2007
- Rathkea Brandt, 1837
