= Acaulidae =

Scientific classification
- Kingdom: Animalia
- Phylum: Cnidaria
- Class: Hydrozoa
- Order: Anthoathecata
- Suborder: Aplanulata
- Family: Acaulidae; Fraser, 1924

Family of hydrozoans

Acaulidae is a family of cnidarians belonging to the order Anthoathecata.

Genera:

- Acaulis Stimpson, 1853
- Acauloides Bouillon, 1965
- Blastothela Verrill, 1878
- Cryptohydra Thomas, Edwards & Higgins, 1995
