= Paulinum (cnidarian) =

Scientific classification
- Kingdom: Animalia
- Phylum: Cnidaria
- Class: Hydrozoa
- Order: Anthoathecata
- Suborder: Capitata
- Genus: Paulinum; Brinckmann-Voss & Arai, 1998

Genus of cnidarians

Paulinum is a genus of hydrozoans belonging to the order Anthoathecata, family unassigned.

The species of this genus are found in Indian Ocean, Northern America.

Species:

- Paulinum lineatum Brinckmann-Voss & Arai, 1998
- Paulinum punctatum (Vanhöffen, 1911)
