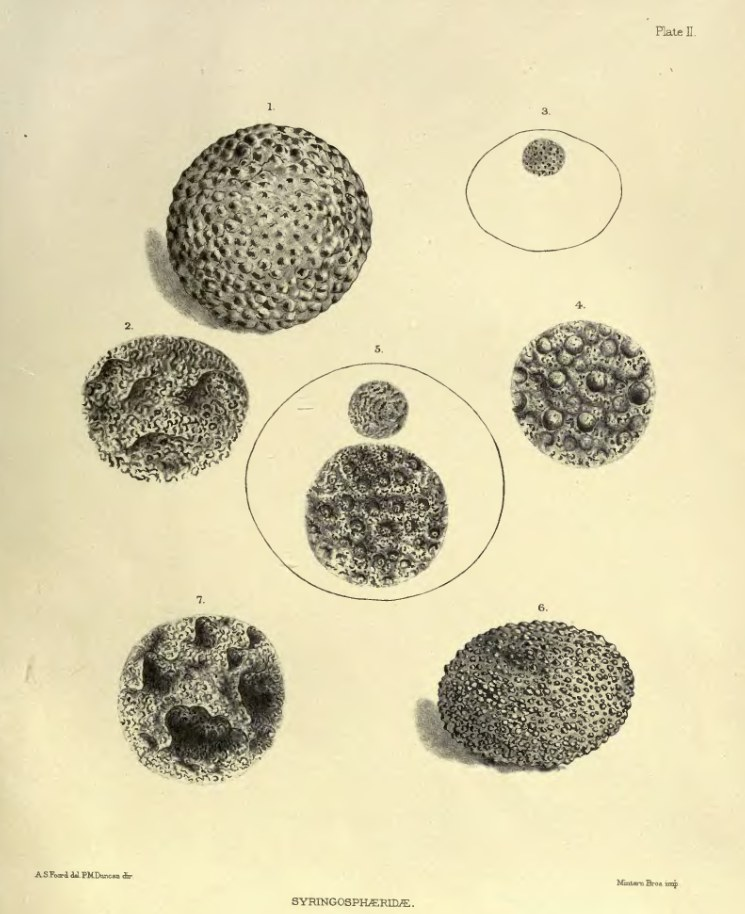
- Some Karakorum stones (labelled as Stoliczkaria and Syringosphaera)

Scientific classification
- Domain: Eukaryota
- Kingdom: Animalia
- Phylum: Cnidaria
- Class: Hydrozoa
- Order: Anthoathecata
- Suborder: Anthoathecata incertae sedis
- Family: †Heterastridiidae; Frech, 1890
- Genus: †Heterastridium; Reuss, 1865

= Heterastridium =

Extinct genus of hydrozoans

Heterastridium is an extinct genus of marine hydrozoan. It is the only accepted genus in the monotypic family Heterastridiidae. The fossils date from the Upper Triassic. They are mostly discoid or spherical and some forms found in the Karakorum mountains are called Karakorum stones. They vary in diameter from 1 to 35 cm and appear to follow Cope's rule for the prehistoric climate.
