= Pteronema =

Scientific classification
- Domain: Eukaryota
- Kingdom: Animalia
- Phylum: Cnidaria
- Class: Hydrozoa
- Order: Anthoathecata
- Suborder: Capitata
- Family: Pteronemidae; Haeckel, 1879
- Genus: Pteronema; Haeckel, 1879

Synonyms
- Microstoma Lesson, 1830

Genus of hydrozoans

Pteronema is a genus of hydrozoans belonging to the monotypic family Pteronemidae.

Species:

- Pteronema ambiguum (Lesson, 1830)
- Pteronema darwinii Haeckel, 1879
