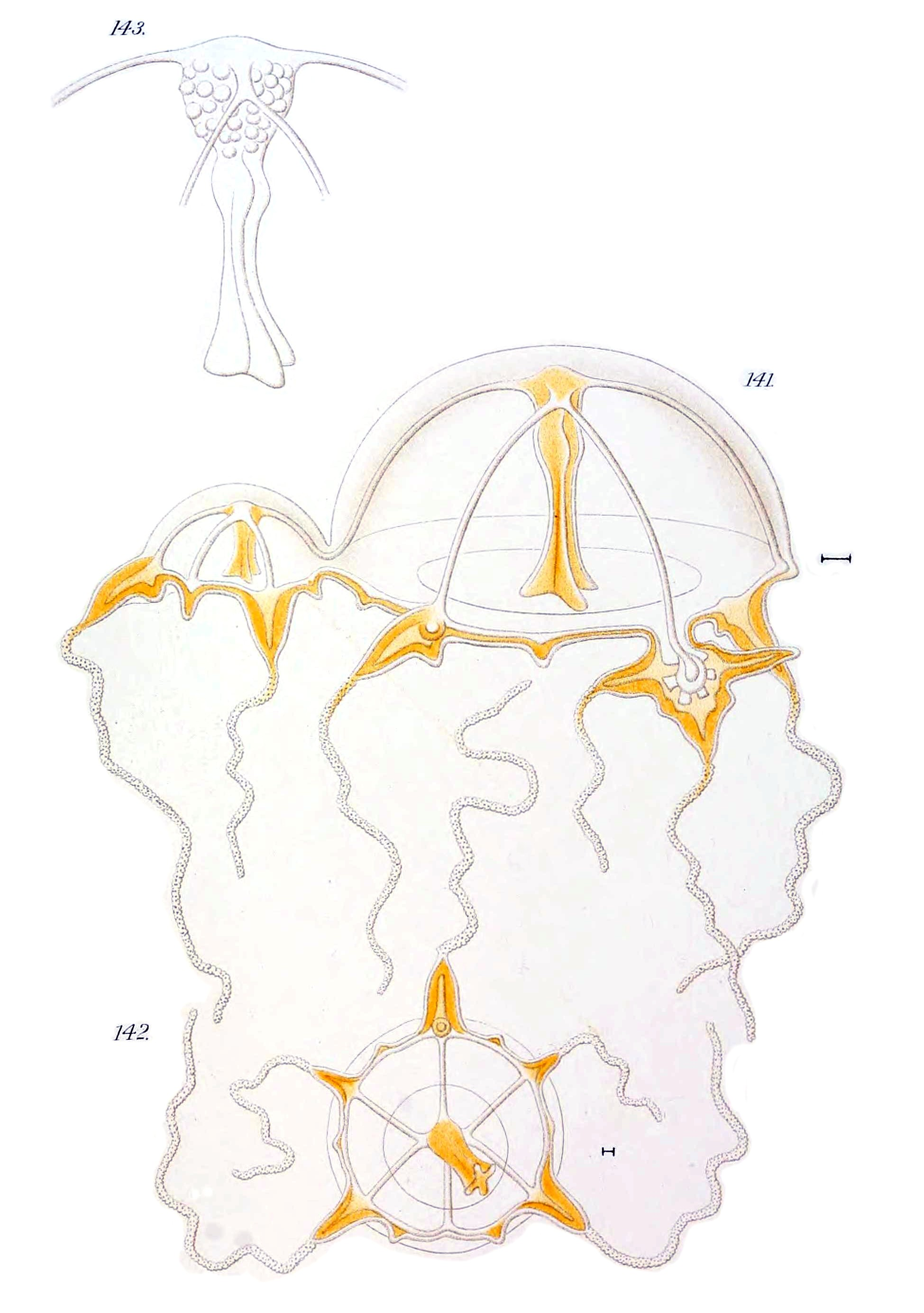
- Niobia dendrotentacula

Scientific classification
- Kingdom: Animalia
- Phylum: Cnidaria
- Class: Hydrozoa
- Order: Anthoathecata
- Suborder: Filifera
- Family: Niobiidae; Petersen, 1979
- Genus: Niobia; Mayer, 1900
- Species: N. dendrotentaculata

Binomial name
- Niobia dendrotentaculata Mayer, 1900

= Niobia dendrotentaculata =

Species of hydrozoan

Niobia is a monotypic genus of cnidarians belonging to the monotypic family Niobiidae. The only species is Niobia dendrotentaculata.

The species is found in Northern America.
