= Halimedusidae =

Scientific classification
- Kingdom: Animalia
- Phylum: Cnidaria
- Class: Hydrozoa
- Order: Anthoathecata
- Suborder: Capitata
- Family: Halimedusidae

Monotypic family of hydrozoans

Halimedusidae is a family of cnidarians belonging to the order Anthoathecata.

Genera:

- Halimedusa Bigelow, 1916
- Octorhopalona Toshino, Yamamoto & Saito, 2022
- Tiaricodon Browne, 1902
- Urashimea Kishinouye, 1910
