= Ptilocodiidae =

Scientific classification
- Kingdom: Animalia
- Phylum: Cnidaria
- Class: Hydrozoa
- Order: Anthoathecata
- Suborder: Filifera
- Family: Ptilocodiidae; Coward, 1909

Family of hydrozoans

Ptilocodiidae is a family of hydrozoans in the order Anthoathecata.

== Genera ==
- Hansiella Bouillon, 1980
- Hydrichthella Stechow, 1909
- Ptilocodium Coward, 1909
- Thecocodium Bouillon, 1967
- Tregoubovia Picard, 1958
- Tregouboviopsis Wang, Du, Xu, Huang & Guo, 2017
