= Boreohydridae =

Scientific classification
- Kingdom: Animalia
- Phylum: Cnidaria
- Class: Hydrozoa
- Order: Anthoathecata
- Suborder: Aplanulata
- Family: Boreohydridae

Family of hydrozoans

Boreohydridae is a family of cnidarians belonging to the order Anthoathecata.

Genera:

- Plotocnide Wagner, 1885
- Psammohydra Schulz, 1950
