= Moerisiidae =

Scientific classification
- Kingdom: Animalia
- Phylum: Cnidaria
- Class: Hydrozoa
- Order: Anthoathecata
- Suborder: Capitata
- Family: Moerisiidae

Family of hydrozoans

Moerisiidae is a family of cnidarians belonging to the order Anthoathecata.

Genera:

- Halmomises von Kennel, 1891
- Moerisia Boulenger, 1908
- Odessia Paspalew, 1937
