= Eucodoniidae =

Scientific classification
- Kingdom: Animalia
- Phylum: Cnidaria
- Class: Hydrozoa
- Order: Anthoathecata
- Family: Eucodoniidae

Family of hydrozoans

Eucodoniidae is a family of hydrozoans belonging to the order Anthoathecata.

Genera:

- Eucodonium Hartlaub, 1907
