= Tricyclusa =

Scientific classification
- Kingdom: Animalia
- Phylum: Cnidaria
- Class: Hydrozoa
- Order: Anthoathecata
- Suborder: Capitata
- Family: Tricyclusidae; Kramp, 1949
- Genus: Tricyclusa; Stechow, 1919
- Species: T. singularis

Binomial name
- Tricyclusa singularis (Schulze, 1876)

Genus of hydrozoans

Tricyclusa is a monotypic genus of cnidarians belonging to the monotypic family Tricyclusidae. The only species is Tricyclusa singularis.

The species is found in Western Europe.
