= Heterotentaculidae =

Scientific classification
- Kingdom: Animalia
- Phylum: Cnidaria
- Class: Hydrozoa
- Order: Anthoathecata
- Family: Heterotentaculidae

Family of hydrozoans

Heterotentaculidae is a family of cnidarians belonging to the order Anthoathecata.

Genera:

- Heterotentacula Schuchert, 2010
