= Boeromedusa =

Scientific classification
- Domain: Eukaryota
- Kingdom: Animalia
- Phylum: Cnidaria
- Class: Hydrozoa
- Order: Anthoathecata
- Family: Boeromedusidae; Bouillon, 1995
- Genus: Boeromedusa; Bouillon, 1995

Family of cnidarians

Boeromedusidae is a family of cnidarians belonging to the order Anthoathecata. It contains a single genus, Boeromedusa.
