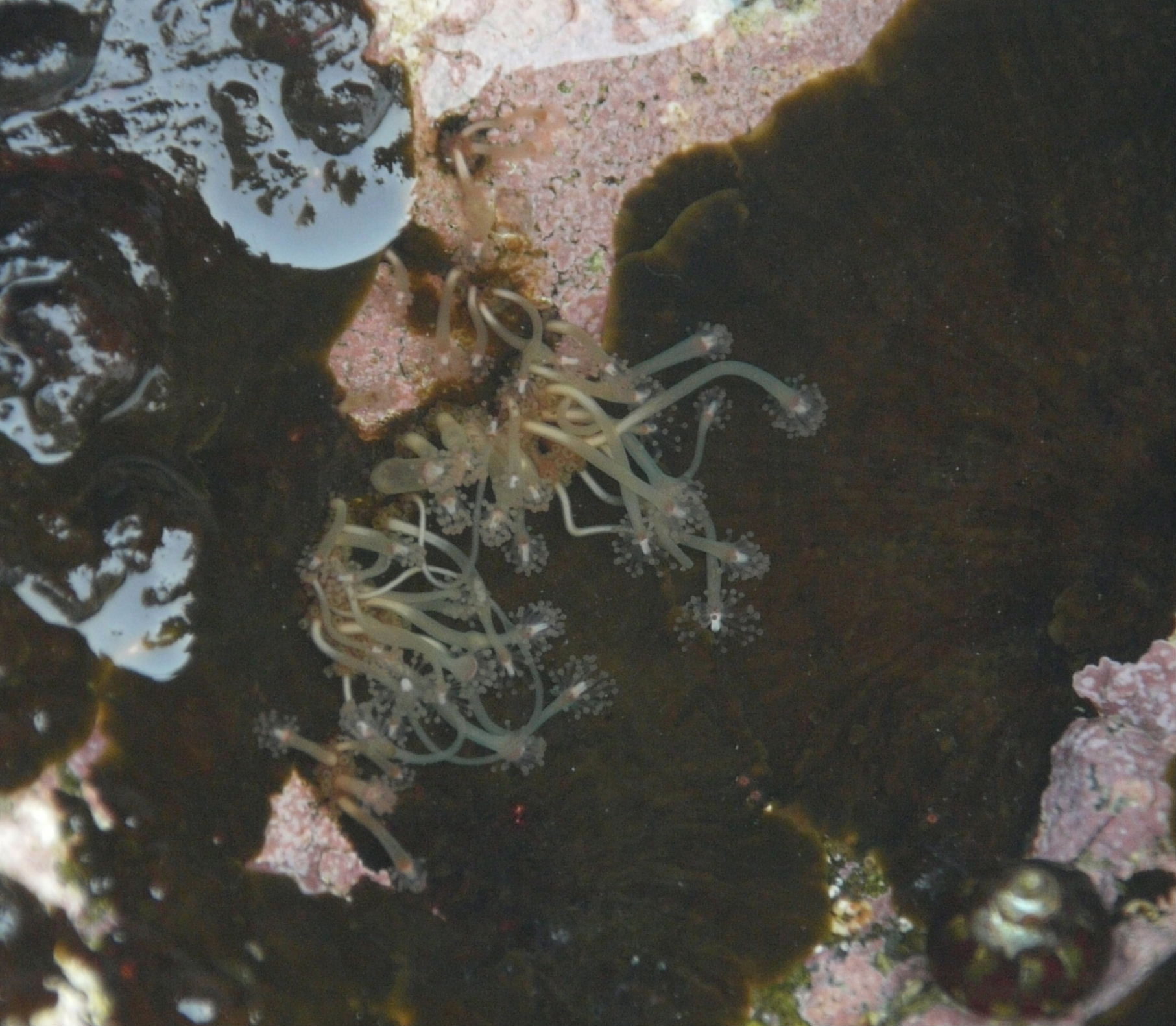
- Hydrocoryne miurensis

Scientific classification
- Kingdom: Animalia
- Phylum: Cnidaria
- Class: Hydrozoa
- Order: Anthoathecata
- Suborder: Capitata
- Family: Hydrocorynidae

= Hydrocorynidae =

Family of hydrozoans

Hydrocorynidae is a family of cnidarians belonging to the order Anthoathecata.

Genera:

- Hydrocoryne Stechow, 1908
- Samuraia Mangin, 1991
