= Balellidae =

Scientific classification
- Kingdom: Animalia
- Phylum: Cnidaria
- Class: Hydrozoa
- Order: Anthoathecata
- Family: Balellidae

Family of hydrozoans

Balellidae is a family of cnidarians belonging to the order Anthoathecata.

Genera:

- Balella Stechow, 1919
