= Jeanbouilloniidae =

Scientific classification
- Kingdom: Animalia
- Phylum: Cnidaria
- Class: Hydrozoa
- Order: Anthoathecata
- Family: Jeanbouilloniidae

Family of hydrozoans

Jeanbouilloniidae is a family of cnidarians belonging to the order Anthoathecata.

Genera:

- Jeanbouillonia Pagès, Flood & Youngbluth, 2006
