= Australomedusidae =

Scientific classification
- Kingdom: Animalia
- Phylum: Cnidaria
- Class: Hydrozoa
- Order: Anthoathecata
- Family: Australomedusidae

Family of cnidarians

Australomedusidae is a family of cnidarians belonging to the order Anthoathecata.

Genera:

- Australomedusa Russell, 1970
- Octorathkea Uchida, 1927
- Zhangiella Bouillon, Gravili, Pages, Gili & Boero, 2006
