= Clathrozoella =

Scientific classification
- Kingdom: Animalia
- Phylum: Cnidaria
- Class: Hydrozoa
- Order: Anthoathecata
- Family: Clathrozoellidae; Peña Cantero, Vervoort & Watson, 2003
- Genus: Clathrozoella; Stechow, 1921

Family of hydrozoans

Clathrozoella is a genus of hydrozoans in the order Anthoathecata. It is the only genus in the monotypic family Clathrozoellidae.

== Species ==
The following species are recognised in the genus Clathrozoella:

- Clathrozoella abyssalis Peña Cantero, Vervoort & Watson, 2003
- Clathrozoella bathyalis Peña Cantero, Vervoort & Watson, 2003
- Clathrozoella drygalskii (Vanhöffen, 1910)
- Clathrozoella medeae Peña Cantero, Vervoort & Watson, 2003
