= Rhysia =

Scientific classification
- Domain: Eukaryota
- Kingdom: Animalia
- Phylum: Cnidaria
- Class: Hydrozoa
- Order: Anthoathecata
- Family: Rhysiidae (Hickson & Gravely, 1907)
- Genus: Rhysia; Brinckmann, 1965

Genus of hydrozoans

Rhysia is a genus of cnidarians belonging to the monotypic family Rhysiidae.

The species of this genus are found in Western North America.

Species:

- Rhysia autumnalis Brinckmann, 1965
- Rhysia fletcheri Brinckmann-Voss, Lickey & Mills, 1993
- Rhysia halecii (Hickson & Gravely, 1907)
