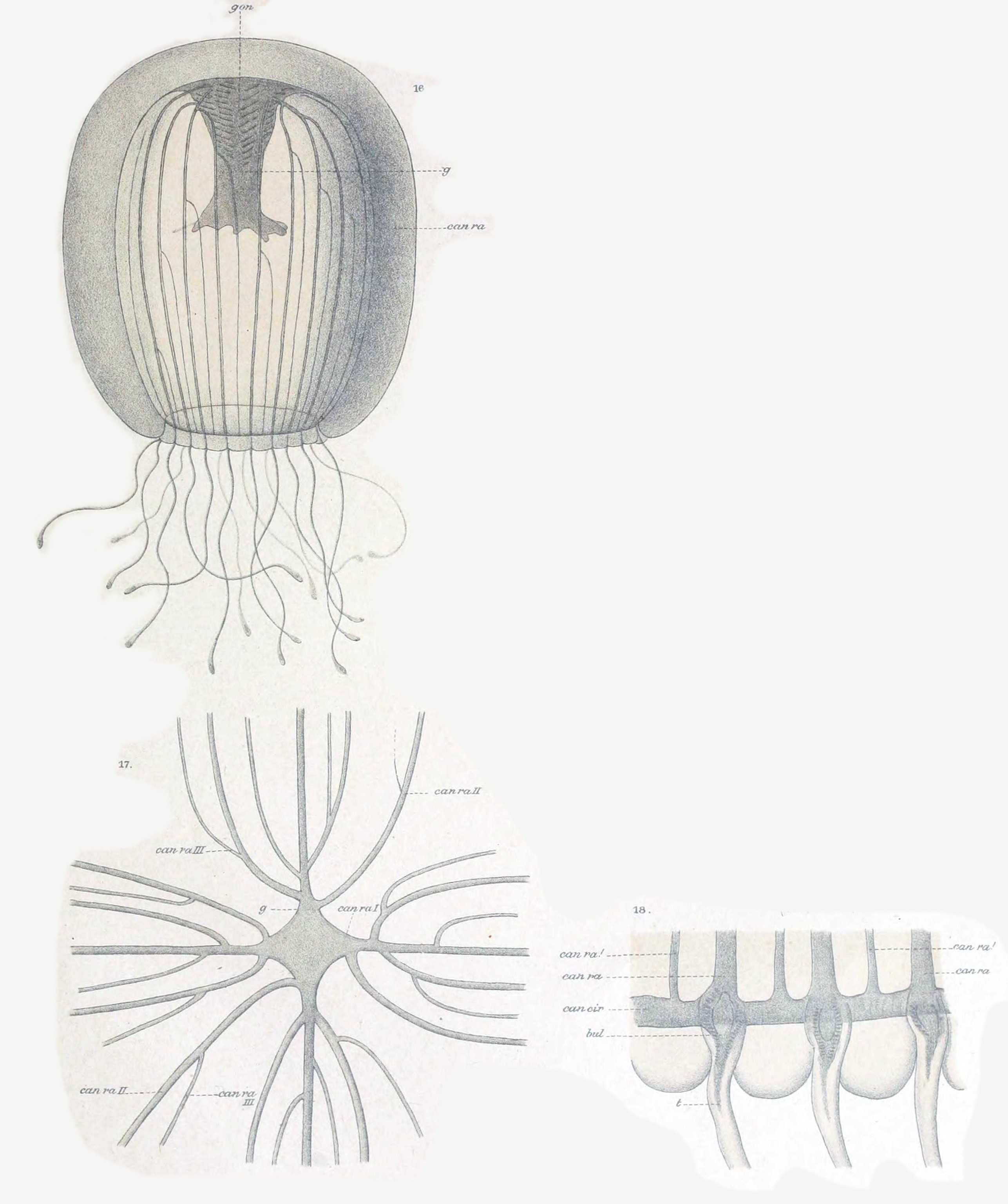
- Sibogita geometrica Maas, 1905

Scientific classification
- Kingdom: Animalia
- Phylum: Cnidaria
- Class: Hydrozoa
- Order: Anthoathecata
- Family: Bythotiaridae; Maas, 1905

= Bythotiaridae =

Family of hydrozoans

Bythotiaridae is a family of cnidarians belonging to the order Anthoathecata.

The family was first described in 1905 by the German zoologist, Otto Maas.

== Genera ==
Genera listed by WoRMS:

1. Brinckmannia Schuchert & Reiswig, 2006
2. Bythocellata Nair, 1951
3. Bythotiara Günther, 1903
4. Calycopsis Fewkes, 1882
5. Eumedusa Bigelow, 1920
6. Gymnogonium Xu & Huang, 1994
7. Laticanna Xu, Huang & Wang, 2018
8. Meator Bigelow, 1913
9. Protiaropsis Stechow, 1919
10. Pseudotiara Bouillon, 1980
11. Sibogita Maas, 1905
12. Kanaka Uchida, 1947 (uncertain )
