= Magapiidae =

Scientific classification
- Kingdom: Animalia
- Phylum: Cnidaria
- Class: Hydrozoa
- Order: Anthoathecata
- Family: Magapiidae

Synonyms
- Laingiidae

Family of hydrozoans

Magapiidae is a family of cnidarians belonging to the order Anthoathecata.

Genera:

- Fabienna Schuchert, 1996
- Kantiella Bouillon, 1978
- Magapia Schuchert & Bouillon, 2009
