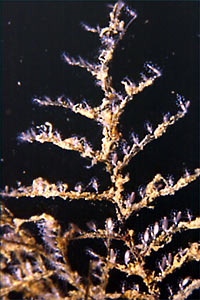
- Pennaria disticha

Scientific classification
- Domain: Eukaryota
- Kingdom: Animalia
- Phylum: Cnidaria
- Class: Hydrozoa
- Order: Anthoathecata
- Suborder: Capitata
- Family: Pennariidae; McCrady, 1859
- Genus: Pennaria; Goldfuss, 1820

Species
- see text

Synonyms
- (Family): Halocordylidae Stechow, 1921; (Genus): Globiceps Ayres, 1854; Eucoryne Leidy, 1855; Halocordyle Allman, 1872

= Pennaria =

Genus of hydrozoans

Pennaria is a genus of hydrozoans. It is the only genus within the monotypic family Pennariidae.

== Species ==
The following species are included in the genus:

- Pennaria armata Vanhöffen, 1911
- Pennaria blistera Xu & Huang, 2006
- Pennaria disticha Goldfuss, 1820
- Pennaria grandis Kramp, 1928
- Pennaria wilsoni Bale, 1913
