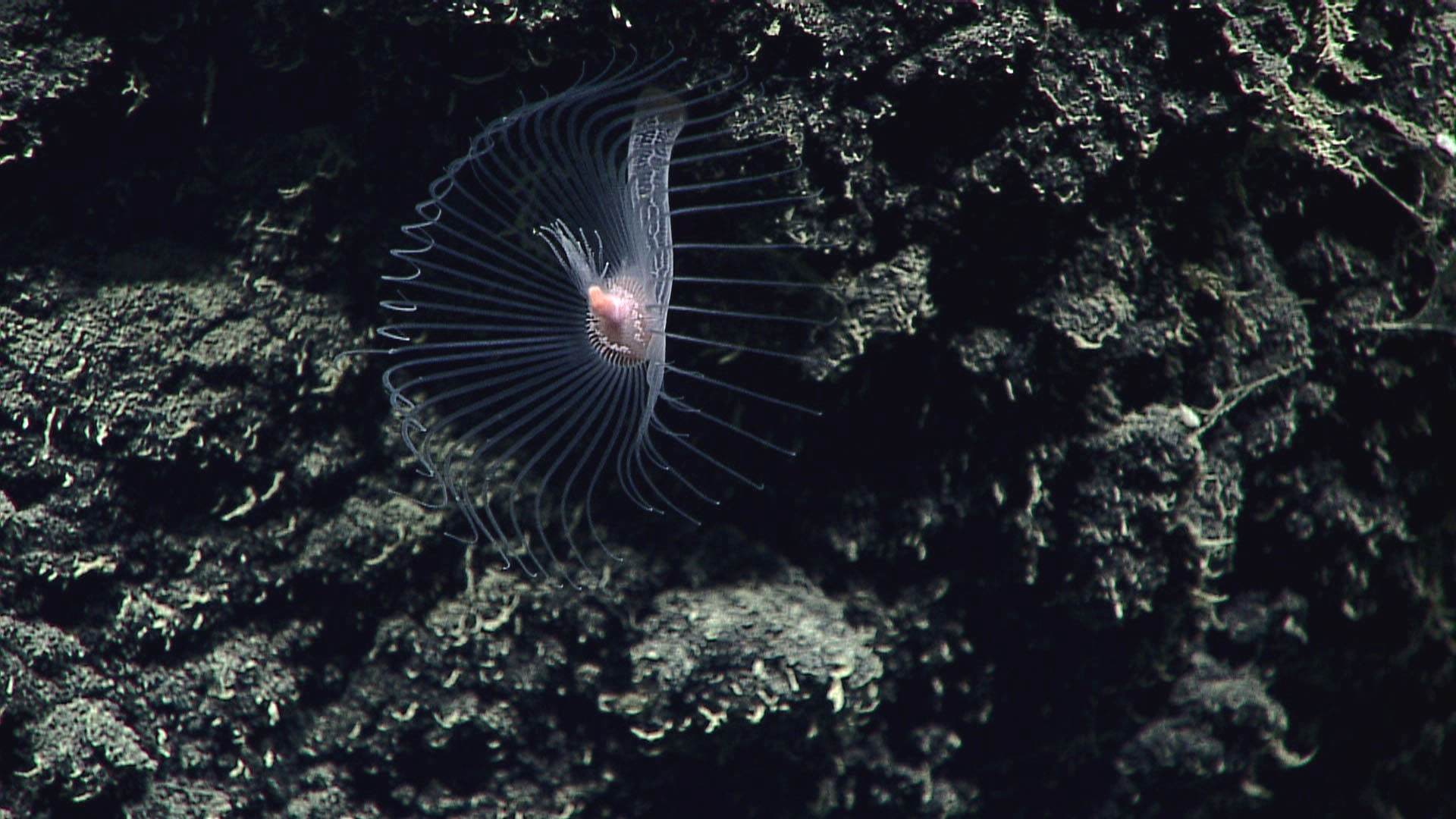

Scientific classification
- Kingdom: Animalia
- Phylum: Cnidaria
- Class: Hydrozoa
- Order: Anthoathecata
- Suborder: Aplanulata
- Family: Corymorphidae; Allman, 1872

Synonyms
- Euphysidae

= Corymorphidae =

Family of hydrozoans

Corymorphidae is a family of hydroid cnidarians. For long placed in a presumed superfamily or infraorder Tubulariida of suborder Capitata, they are actually close relatives of the Hydridae and are now united with these and a number of relatives in a newly recognized suborder Aplanulata. Most, if not all species in this family grow on stalks and resemble small flowers.

According to the World Register of Marine Species, the following genera are contained in this family:

- Branchiocerianthus Mark, 1898
- Corymorpha M. Sars, 1835
- Euphysa Forbes, 1848
- Euphysilla Kramp, 1955
- Gymnogonos Bonnevie, 1898
- Hataia Hirai & Yamada, 1965
- Octovannuccia Xu, Huang & Lin, 2010
- Paraeuphysilla Xu, Huang & Go, 2011
- Paragotoea Kramp, 1942
- Pinushydra Bouillon & Grohmann, 1990
- Siphonohydra Salvini-Plawen, 1966
