= Zancleopsidae =

Scientific classification
- Kingdom: Animalia
- Phylum: Cnidaria
- Class: Hydrozoa
- Order: Anthoathecata
- Family: Zancleopsidae; Bouillon, 1978

Family of hydrozoans

Zancleopsidae is a family of hydrozoans in the order Anthomedusae.
