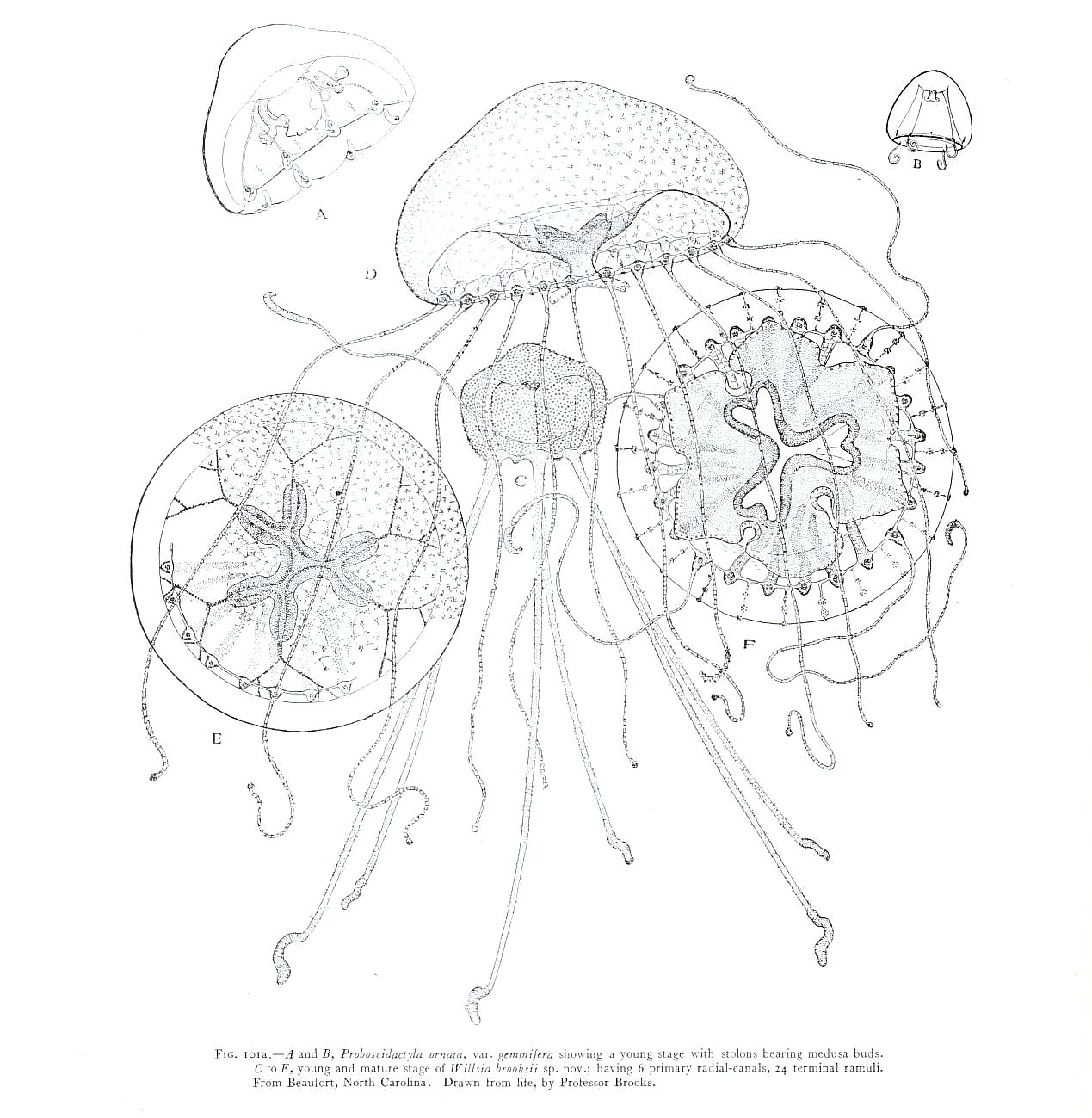
- Proboscidactyla ornata & Proboscidactyla brooksii

Scientific classification
- Kingdom: Animalia
- Phylum: Cnidaria
- Class: Hydrozoa
- Order: Anthoathecata
- Suborder: Filifera
- Family: Proboscidactylidae; Hand & Hendrickson, 1950

= Proboscidactylidae =

Family of hydrozoans

Proboscidactylidae is a family of cnidarians belonging to the order Anthoathecata.

Genera:

- Pochella Hartlaub, 1917
- Proboscidactyla Brandt, 1835
