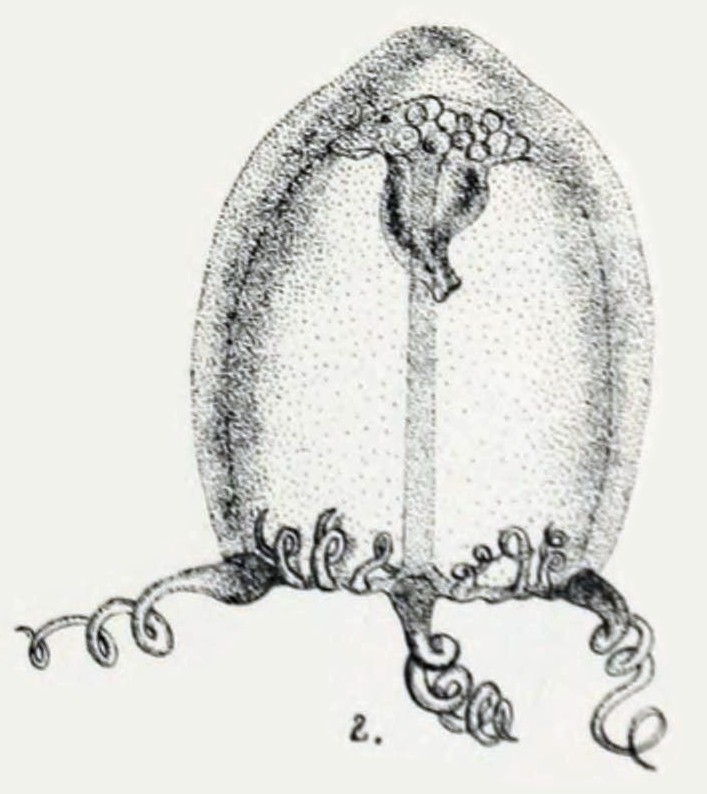
- Halitiara formosa

Scientific classification
- Kingdom: Animalia
- Phylum: Cnidaria
- Class: Hydrozoa
- Order: Anthoathecata
- Family: Protiaridae

= Protiaridae =

Family of hydrozoans

Protiaridae is a family of cnidarians belonging to the order Anthoathecata.

Genera:

- Halitiara Fewkes, 1882
- Halitiarella Bouillon, 1980
- Latitiara Xu & Huang, 1990
- Paratiara Kramp & Damas, 1925
- Protiara Haeckel, 1879
