= Pseudosolanderia =

Scientific classification
- Domain: Eukaryota
- Kingdom: Animalia
- Phylum: Cnidaria
- Class: Hydrozoa
- Order: Anthoathecata
- Suborder: Capitata
- Family: Pseudosolanderiidae; Bouillon & Gravier-Bonnet, 1988
- Genus: Pseudosolanderia; Bouillon & Gravier-Bonnet, 1988

Genus of hydrozoans

Pseudosolanderia is a genus of cnidarians belonging to the monotypic family Pseudosolanderiidae.

Species:

- Pseudosolanderia picardi Bouillon & Gravier-Bonnet, 1988
- Pseudosolanderia sagamina (Hirohito, 1988)
