= Tubiclavoididae =

Scientific classification
- Kingdom: Animalia
- Phylum: Cnidaria
- Class: Hydrozoa
- Order: Anthoathecata
- Family: Tubiclavoididae

Family of hydrozoans

Tubiclavoididae is a family of cnidarians belonging to the order Anthoathecata.

Genera:

- Tubiclavoides Moura, Cunha & Schuchert, 2007
