= Asyncorynidae =

Scientific classification
- Kingdom: Animalia
- Phylum: Cnidaria
- Class: Hydrozoa
- Order: Anthoathecata
- Family: Asyncorynidae

Family of hydrozoans

Asyncorynidae is a family of cnidarians belonging to the order Anthoathecata.

Genera:

- Asyncoryne Warren, 1908
