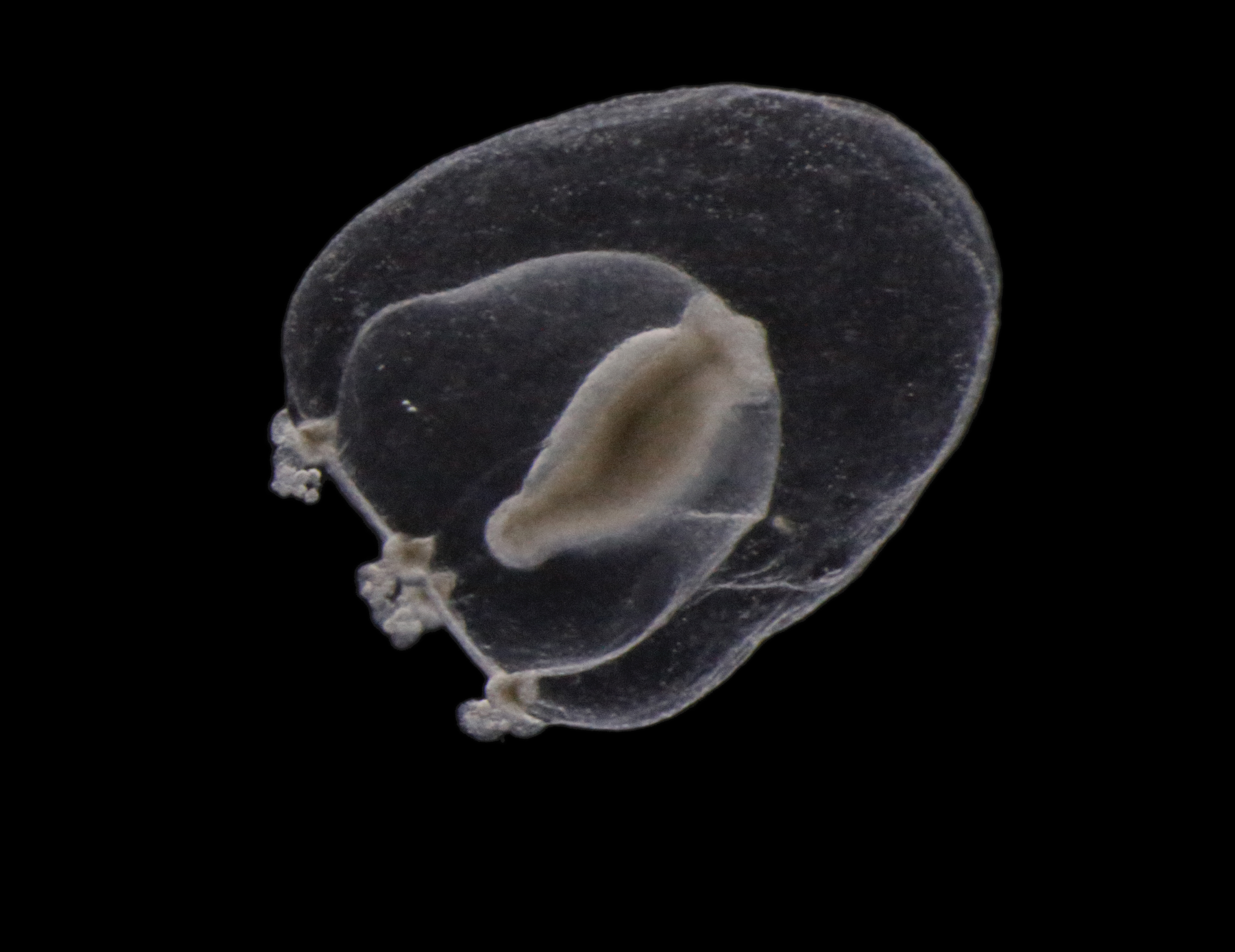
- Margelopsis hartlaubi

Scientific classification
- Kingdom: Animalia
- Phylum: Cnidaria
- Class: Hydrozoa
- Order: Anthoathecata
- Family: Margelopsidae

= Margelopsidae =

Family of hydrozoans

Margelopsidae is a family of cnidarians belonging to the order Anthoathecata.

Genera:

- Climacocodon Uchida, 1924
- Margelopsis Hartlaub, 1897
- Pelagohydra Dendy, 1902
