= Paracoryne =

Scientific classification
- Kingdom: Animalia
- Phylum: Cnidaria
- Class: Hydrozoa
- Order: Anthoathecata
- Family: Paracorynidae
- Genus: Paracoryne; Picard, 1957
- Species: P. huvei

Binomial name
- Paracoryne huvei Picard, 1957

Genus of hydrozoans

Paracoryne is a monotypic genus of cnidarians belonging to the monotypic family Paracorynidae.

The only species is Paracoryne huvei.

The species is found in Southern Europe.
