= Cladocorynidae =

Scientific classification
- Kingdom: Animalia
- Phylum: Cnidaria
- Class: Hydrozoa
- Order: Anthoathecata
- Family: Cladocorynidae

Family of hydrozoans

Cladocorynidae is a family of cnidarians belonging to the order Anthoathecata.

Genera:

- Cladocoryne Rotch, 1871
- Pteroclava Weill, 1931
