= Sphaerocorynidae =

- Sphaerocoryne agassizii

Scientific classification
- Kingdom: Animalia
- Phylum: Cnidaria
- Class: Hydrozoa
- Order: Anthoathecata
- Family: Sphaerocorynidae

Family of hydrozoans

Sphaerocorynidae is a family of cnidarians belonging to the order Anthoathecata.

Genera:

- Astrocoryne Maggioni et al., 2017
- Heterocoryne Wedler & Larson, 1986
- Sphaerocoryne Pictet, 1893
