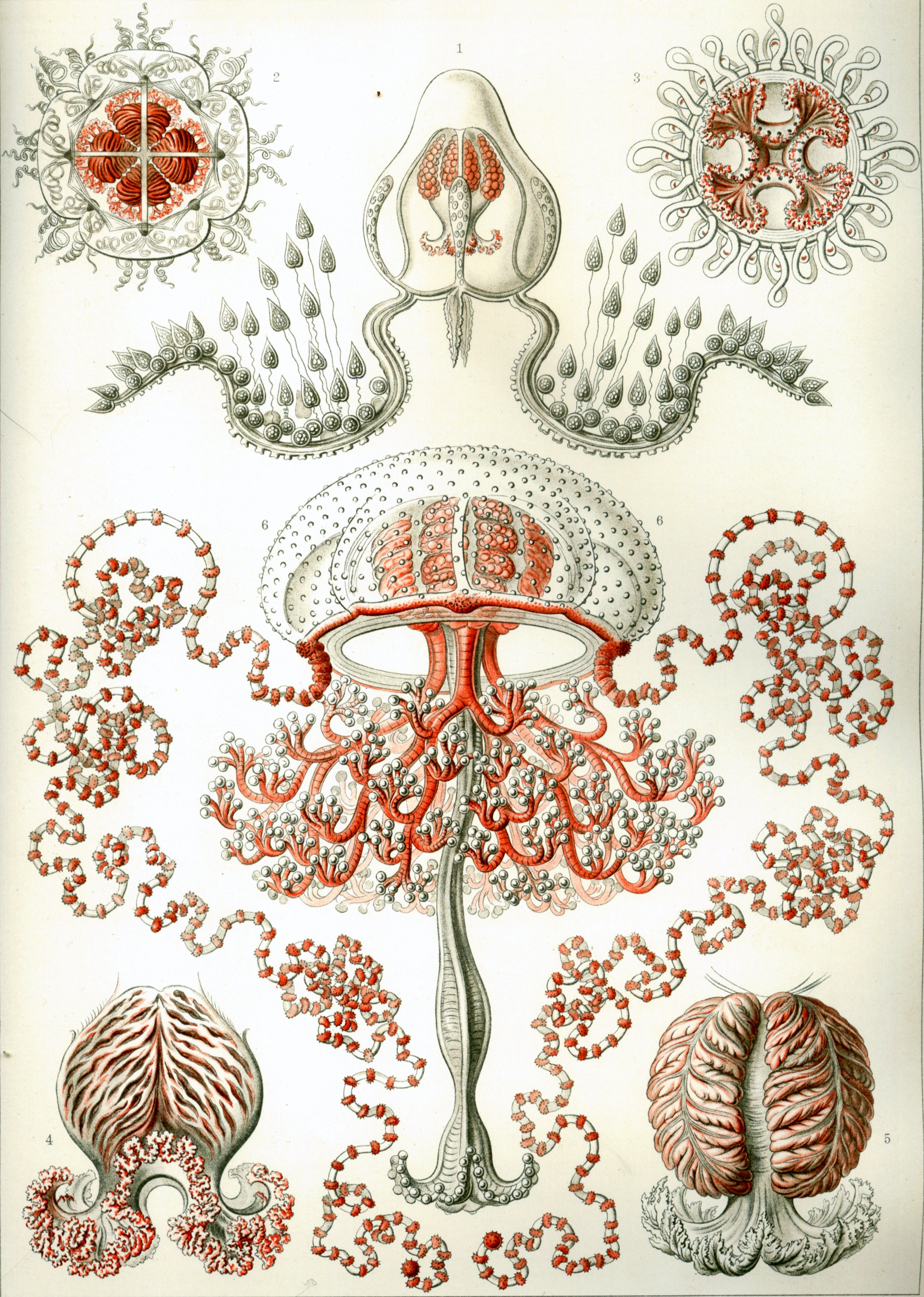
- Anatomical details of Pandeidae (Filifera). Lower left, top right: Neoturris pileata. Lower right: Stomotoca pterophylla. From Kunstformen der Natur by Ernst Haeckel (1904)

Scientific classification
- Kingdom: Animalia
- Phylum: Cnidaria
- Class: Hydrozoa
- Subclass: Hydroidolina
- Order: Anthoathecata; Haeckel, 1879

Suborders
- Aplanulata; Capitata; Filifera; and see text

Synonyms
- Anthomedusa Haeckel, 1879; Anthomedusae Cornelius, 1992; Anthoathecatae Cornelius, 1992 (emendation); Athecata Hincks, 1868; Athecatae Hincks, 1868 (emendation); Gymnoblastea Allman, 1871; Hydromedusa; Hydromedusae; Laingiomedusae; Stylasterina Hickson and England, 1905; Stylasterinae Hickson and England, 1905 (emendation)

= Anthoathecata =

Order of hydrozoans which always have a polyp stage

Anthoathecata, or the athecate hydroids, are an order of hydrozoans belonging to the phylum Cnidaria. A profusion of alternate scientific names exists for this long-known and heavily discussed group. It has also been called Gymnoblastea and (with or without an emended ending -ae), Anthomedusa, Athecata, Hydromedusa, and Stylasterina. There are about 1,200 species worldwide.

These hydrozoans always have a polyp stage. Their hydranths grow either solitary or in colonies. There is no firm perisarc around the polyp body. The medusae, or jellyfish, are solitary animals, with tentacles arising from the bell margin, lacking statocysts but possessing radial canals. Their gonads are on the manubrium ("handle").

Except in Eudendriidae and Laingiidae, prey can be captured by discharging harpoon-like structures (desmonemes) from chambers (cnidae) in specialized cells (nematocysts) on the tentacles. In hydrozoans, these are nearly always adhesive and entrapping, rather than puncturing and venomous as in other jellies.

== Systematics ==
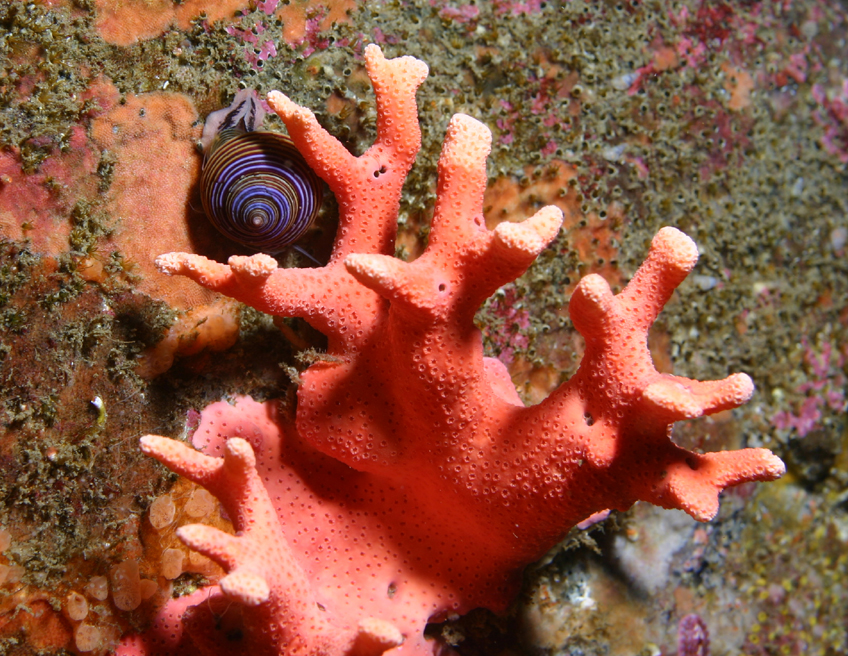
It is not clear whether Stylaster californicus belongs in the Filifera. Upper left: blue top snail (Calliostoma ligatum).

The close relationship of the orders Anthoathecata and Leptomedusae has been long known, but formerly it was also believed that these two were close to the order Limnomedusae. However, their closest relatives are the highly advanced Siphonophorae, whereas the Limnomedusae are a rather primitive group, and not very closely related to these three Leptolinae, and might instead belong to the subclass Trachylinae.

Some uncertainty existed regarding the taxonomy of the order Anthoathecata. The most simple scheme, used until recently by most authors since it was proposed in 1913, divided the order into a smaller suborder (Filifera) and a second larger one (Capitata), but several unusual Anthoathecatae did not fit into this arrangement, and a considerable number did so awkwardly. The Porpitidae, for example, are a highly aberrant group, and were at one time even considered a separate order "Chondrophora". However, they are currently considered to be derived from Zancleida. In the early 21st century, the well-known Hydra and its relatives – and most of the supposed filiferan infraorders Tubulariida and Moerisiida – were determined to be a very ancient lineage, recognized as suborder Aplanulata. Although not all Anthoathecatae have been firmly placed in the phylogeny, most are fairly certainly assigned at least to one of the major subdivisions. As a notable exception, a prehistoric family, the Heterastridiidae, is still highly disputed regarding its relationships to the extant taxa, as are a small number of very aberrant and/or little-known species such as the aptly named Saccohydra problematica.

The family Clathrozoellidae is placed with the Filifera here; in others it is placed in the Leptomedusae and sometimes even synonymized with their family Clathrozoidae. By contrast, the supposed filiferan genus Anthohydra is in fact the leptomedusan Eugymnanthea; similarly, "Gammaria" is also a leptomedusan and properly spelled Grammaria.

The supposed athecate family Monobrachiidae is apparently a close relative of the Olindiasidae, and belongs in the Limnomedusae. Halammohydridae and Otohydridae, sometimes placed here, appear to be trachyline hydrozoans of the order Actinulidae.

=== Infraorders and families ===
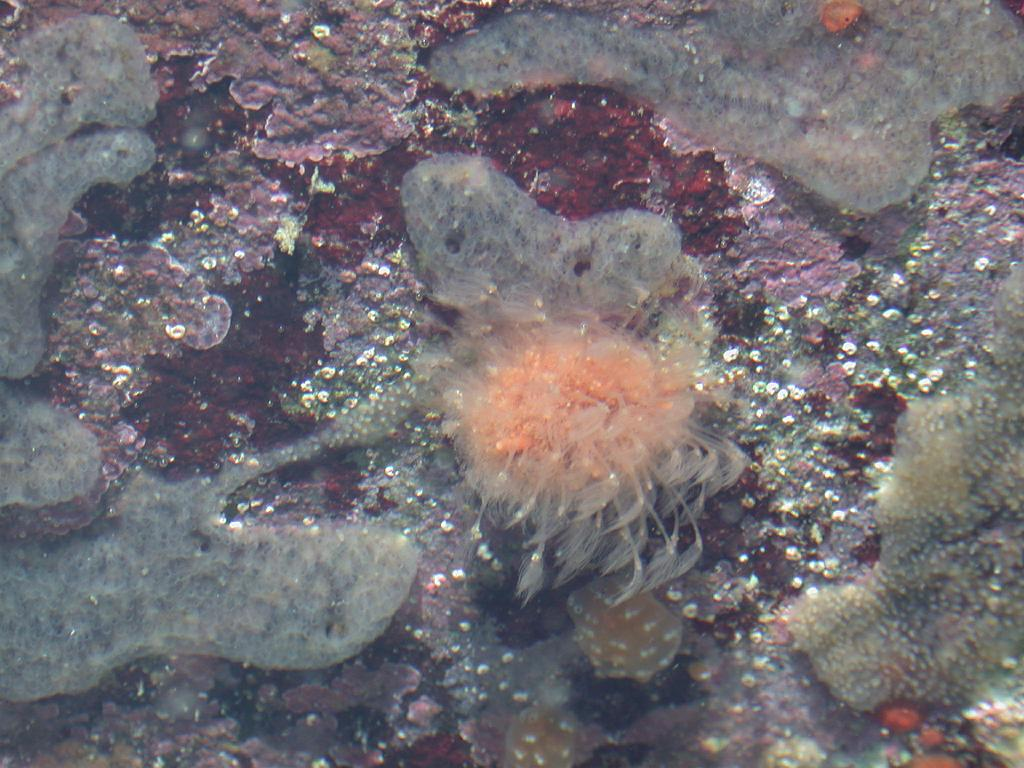
Hydractinia epiconcha belongs to the Margelina in the suborder Filifera.

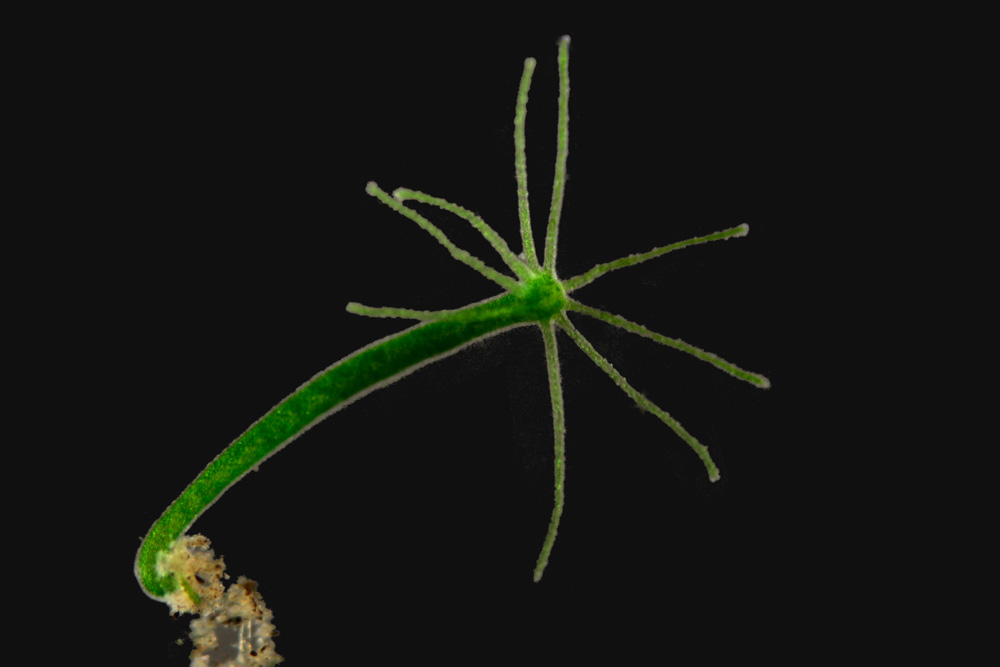
The well-known freshwater polyp Hydra viridissima, formerly placed in the Capitata, belongs to the Aplanulata.

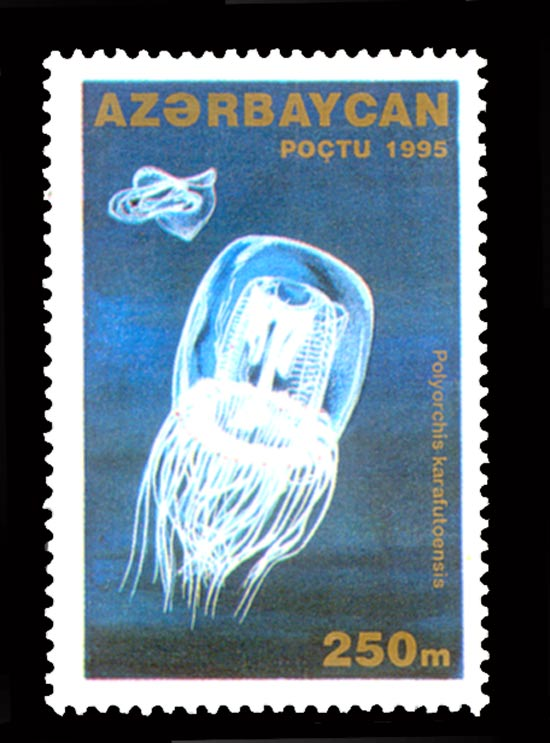
Polyorchis karafutoensis, a true member of the Capitata, on a 1995 stamp from Azerbaijan.

Basal and incertae sedis Anthoathecata

- Genus Bibrachium Stechow, 1919
- Genus "Microstoma" Lesson, 1830 (nomen dubium; non G.Cuvier, 1816: preoccupied)
- Genus Saccohydra Billiard, 1914
- †Family Heterastridiidae (fossil)

Suborder Aplanulata Collins, Winkelman, Hadrys & Schierwater, 2005

- Family Acaulidae Fraser, 1924 (formerly in Tubulariida)
- Family Boeromedusidae Bouillon, 1995 (formerly in Moerisiida)
- Family Boreohydridae Westblad, 1947 (formerly in Tubulariida)
- Family Myriothelidae Hincks, 1868 (including Candelabridae, Symplectaneidae; formerly in Tubulariida)
- Family Corymorphidae Allman, 1872 (including Amalthaeidae, Branchiocerianthidae, Euphysidae, Hypolytidae, Monocaulidae, Paragotoeidae, Steenstrupiini, Trichorhizini; formerly in Tubulariida)
- Family Hydridae Dana, 1846 (formerly in Moerisiida)
- Family Margelopsidae Uchida, 1927 (including Pelagohydridae; formerly in Tubulariida)
- Family Paracorynidae Picard, 1957 (formerly in Tubulariida)
- Family Protohydridae Allman, 1888 (formerly in Moerisiida)
- Family Tubulariidae

Suborder Filifera Kühn, 1913

Basal or incertae sedis

- Genus Brinckmannia Schuchert & Reiswig, 2006
- Genus Favonia Péron & Lesueur, 1810 (nomen dubium)
- Genus Kinetocodium Kramp, 1921 (Margelina: Hydractiniidae?)
- Genus Lymnorea Péron & Lesueur, 1810 (= Limnorea; nomen dubium)
- Family Axoporidae Boschma, 1951 (fossil)
- Family Bythotiaridae Maas, 1905 (including Calycopsidae; Pandeida?)
- Family Clathrozoellidae Peña Cantero, Vervoort & Watson, 2003 (tentatively placed here)
- Family Cordylophoridae von Lendenfeld, 1885
- Family Jeanbouilloniidae Pagès, Flood & Youngbluth, 2006
- Family Oceaniidae (Margelina?)
- Family Tubiclavoididae Moura, Cunha & Schuchert, 2007 (Pandeida?)

Infraorder Margelina Haeckel, 1879 (disputed)

- Family Australomedusidae Russell, 1971 (including Platystomidae)
- Family Balellidae Stechow, 1922
- Family Bougainvilliidae
- Family Cytaeididae L. Agassiz, 1862
- Family Eucodoniidae Schuchert, 1996
- Family Hydractiniidae
- Family Ptilocodiidae Coward, 1909
- Family Rathkeidae Russell, 1953
- Family Rhysiidae Hickson & Gravely, 1907; (tentatively placed here)
- Family Stylasteridae (tentatively placed here)
- Family Trichydridae Hincks, 1868

Infraorder Pandeida (disputed)

- Family Eudendriidae
- Family Magapiidae Schuchert & Bouillon, 2009 (formerly Laingiidae; tentatively placed here)
- Family Niobiidae Petersen, 1979
- Family Pandeidae
- Family Proboscidactylidae Hand & Hendrickson, 1950
- Family Protiaridae Haeckel, 1879
- Family Heterotentaculidae Schuchert, 2010 (formerly Russelliidae; tentatively placed here)

Suborder Capitata Kühn, 1913 Basal or incertae sedis

- Genus Cnidocodon Bouillon, 1978 (including Ramus)
- Genus Ctenaria (Zancleida: Zancleidae?)
- Genus Oonautes Damas, 1937 (Zancleida: Zancleidae?)
- Genus Paulinum Brinckmann-Voss & Arai, 1998
- Genus Plotocnide Wagner, 1885 (including Plankayon)
- Genus Propachycordyle Thiel, 1931
- Genus Pteronema Haeckel, 1879
- Genus Rhabdoon Keferstein & Ehlers, 1861 (including Pararhysomedusa, Rhysomedusa, Yakovia)
- Genus Tetraralphia Pagès & Bouillon, 1997

Infraorder Moerisiida Poche, 1914 (disputed)

- Family Halimedusidae Arai & Brinckmann-Voss, 1980 (tentatively placed here)
- Family Moerisiidae Poche, 1914

Infraorder Sphaerocorynida Petersen, 1990 (disputed)

- Family Hydrocorynidae Rees, 1957
- Family Sphaerocorynidae Prévot, 1959
- Family Zancleopsidae Bouillon, 1978

Infraorder N.N. (disputed)

- Family Cladonematidae
- Family Corynidae
- Family Euphysidae
- Family Pennariidae McCrady, 1859 (including Halocordylidae)
- Family Solanderiidae
- Family Tricyclusidae Kramp, 1949

Infraorder Zancleida Russell, 1953 (disputed)

- Family Asyncorynidae Kramp, 1949
- Family Cladocorynidae Allman, 1872
- Family Milleporidae Fleming, 1828 (= Milleporadae)
- Family Porpitidae
- Family Pseudosolanderiidae Bouillon & Gravier-Bonnet, 1988
- Family Rosalindidae Bouillon, 1985
- Family Teissieridae Bouillon, 1978
- Family Zancleidae Russell, 1953 (including Corynipteridae, Halocorynidae, Orthocorynidae)
