= Frondosa =

The Latin word frondosa (meaning "leafy") is the species name of many unrelated fungi, plants, and animals that have a frondose shape.

== Fungi ==
- Grifola frondosa, a polypore mushroom that grows at the base of oaks, called hen of the woods.
- Tremella frondosa, a jelly fungus known in China

== Plants ==
- Primula frondosa, a species of flowering plant in the family Primulaceae, native to the Balkans
- Calceolaria frondosa, a flowering plant endemic to Ecuador
- Gaylussacia frondosa, a flowering plant in the heath family
- Bidens frondosa, a North American annual herb related to sunflowers
- Mussaenda frondosa, a shrub in the family Rubiaceae, also called the dhobi tree.
- Nematolepis frondosa, a shrub endemic to Victoria, Australia
- Muhlenbergia frondosa, a satin grass in genus Muhlenbergia.

== Animals ==
- Bougainvillia frondosa, a hydrozoan invertebrate
- Rhinopias frondosa, a benthic marine fish in the Scorpionfish family
- Tritonia frondosa, a dendronotid nudibranch (sea slug).
- Cucumaria frondosa, the orange-footed sea cucumber.
- Heterotrypa frondosa, an Ordovician fossil organism among the Paleozoic life of Tennessee

== See also ==
- Frondose
- Frond
