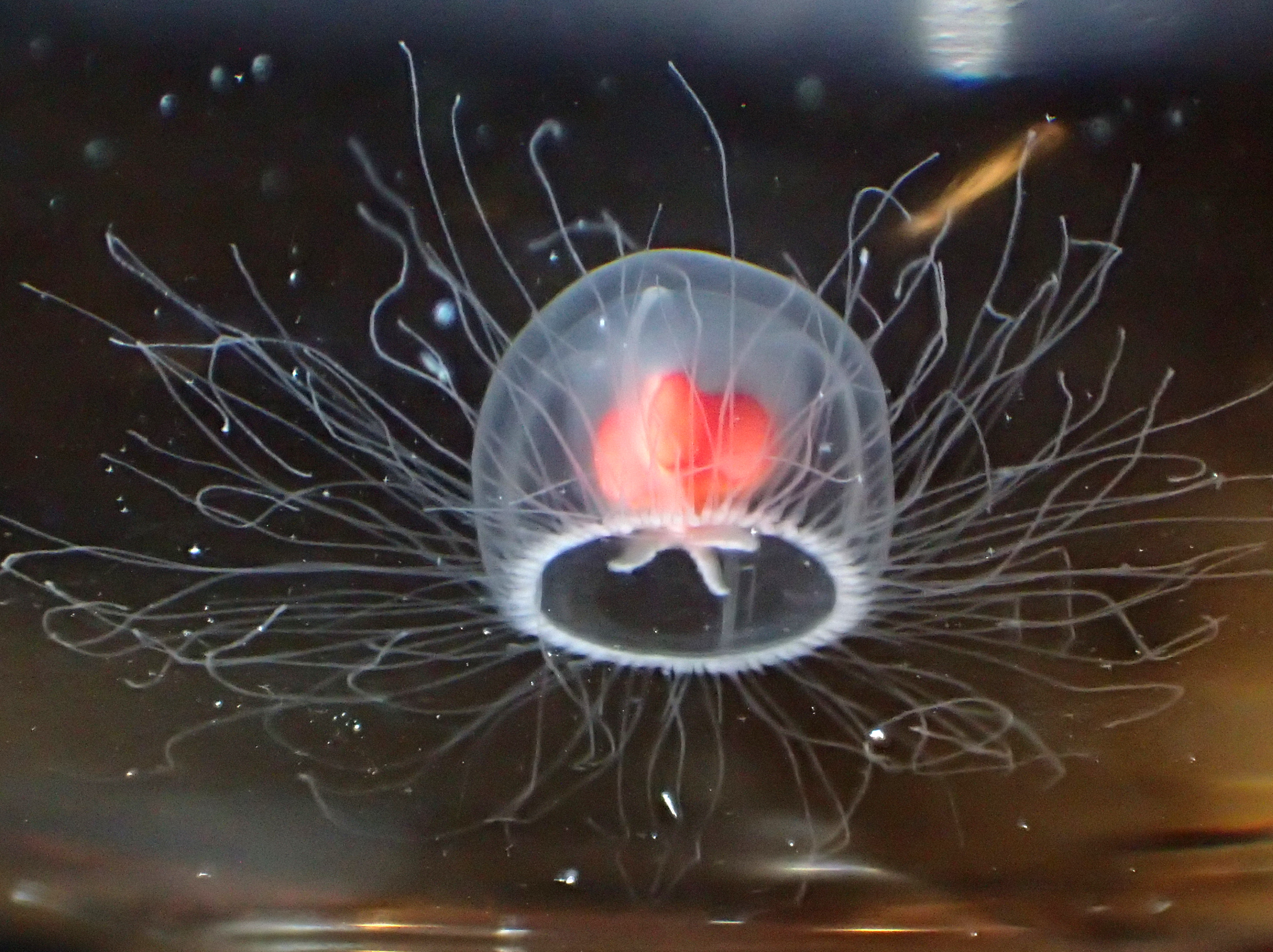

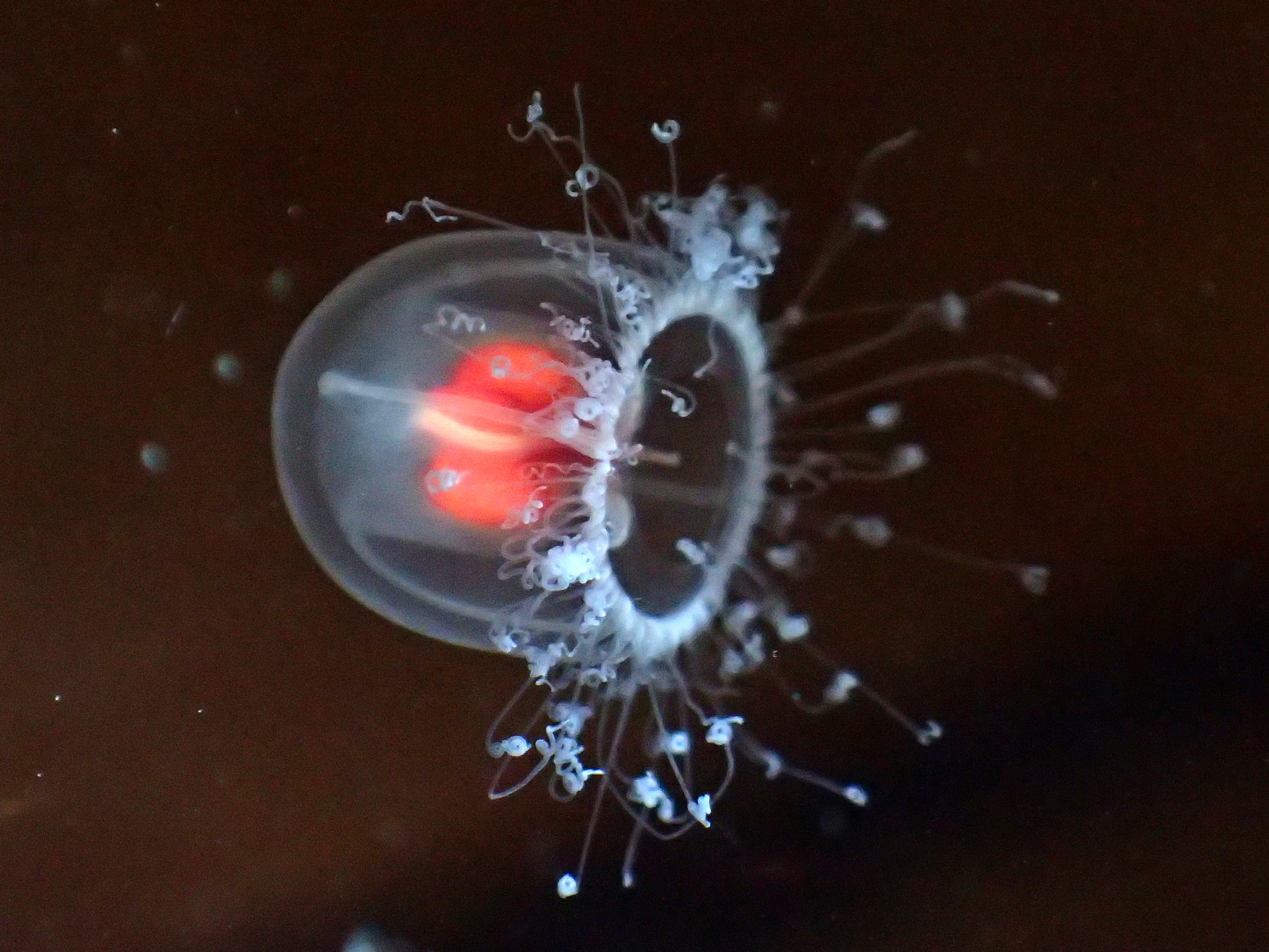

Scientific classification
- Kingdom: Animalia
- Phylum: Cnidaria
- Class: Hydrozoa
- Order: Anthoathecata
- Family: Oceaniidae
- Genus: Turritopsis
- Species: T. rubra

Binomial name
- Turritopsis rubra (Farquhar, 1895)

= Turritopsis rubra =

Species of small South Pacific hydrozoan

Turritopsis rubra, commonly referred to as the crimson jelly, is a hydrozoan within the family Oceaniidae. The species is native to New Zealand and southern Australia, typically appearing near shorelines in the summer months (December–March). The species follows a distribution pattern across the southern Pacific Ocean and can frequently be found in shallow coastal waters.

The bell of the crimson jelly is transparent which allows for the bright red stomach and gonads to be visible from the outside. This gives the appearance of a bright red creature in clear water which has prompted the name "crimson jelly". The jellyfish has tentacles attached at the end of the bell margin that can be used for defense and hunting. The tentacles are used to sting and catch prey but are harmless to humans as they are too small to sting larger creatures. The creature is very tiny, being less than an inch in size and has the ability to sting but does not produce a poisonous mark.

It is closely related to Turritopsis dohrnii, commonly known as the immortal jellyfish, which is biologically immortal, being able to revert its life cycle to avoid death. Research has not yet confirmed if the crimson jellyfish has the same ability, but researchers believe it may be a possibility. The Turritopsis genus was noted in the late 1850s, but the individual species Turritopsis rubra was officially phylogenetically traced and identified in 2022 by biologist Andrew Esber at the University of Auckland, New Zealand.

== Description ==
Swimming

The entire Turritopsis genus is a very small group of Hydrozoa creatures with the crimson jellyfish being on the slightly larger side of the genus. The crimson jellyfish ranges in size from just 3 to 7 mm depending on what stage of its life cycle the creature is currently in. Being roughly the size of a pinky nail, the creature is like many other jellyfish being very simple with few organs. Underneath its transparent umbrella, the jellyfish has just a stomach, gonads, and a mouth. The bell margin then rounds out the umbrella and is the attachment point for the tentacles. These tentacles serve the purpose of hunting and gathering food, because — unlike many other species of jellyfish — the crimson jellyfish does not have any arms. The crimson jelly has approximately 120 tentacles which is significantly more than other members of the Turritopsis genus which range from 80 to 100 tentacles.

== Life cycle ==
The life cycle for members of the hydrozoa family is extraordinarily unique because it occurs over two different phases. Depending on the current phase of an individual, that individual may be able to reproduce sexually or asexually. The first phase is known as the polyp stage. During this phase, larvae produced by mature jellyfish grow into small stalk-like figures that attach themselves to some kind of surface. These polyps form into an extended branch-like form which is uncommon amongst jellyfish species. The crimson jellyfish typically prefers to attach to docks, marinas, vessels, or the ocean floor. Once the polyps find a suitable surface, they will continue to grow until they can asexually reproduce medusae buds. These medusae buds are the beginning of the second phase in the jellyfish's life cycle. The buds grow into a fully mature diocious medusae jellyfish which can then utilize sexual reproduction to once again start the life cycle. It is common for maternal medusae to exemplify maternal care towards the larvae that are first produced until they can find a suitable habitat. The mother will carry the larvae at the bell margin, located at the bottom of the bell before the tentacles. They are carried until they are fully developed into polyps and are capable of anchoring onto a surface. After the larvae are ready to detach from the mother, they will travel in colonies until they reach a suitable home. This behavior leads to large swarms of medusae because the polyps will reproduce in the same area and cause many medusae to develop around the same time frame in a suitable environment for them to thrive. A single polyp is capable of producing as many as twelve medusae buds before its part in the life cycle ends.

== Distribution ==
The crimson jellyfish is mainly distributed in the Southeastern Pacific Ocean. This includes Southeastern Australia, Tasmania, and Northern New Zealand. The species is typically visible in shallow coastal water during the summer months between December and March. While the Turritopsis rubra is limited to the Southeastern pacific, the Turritopsis genus has been distributed all over the world. This distribution is credited towards the polyps ability to latch on to a surface which can include vessels such as large international ships. Because of this global distribution and the prehistoric phylogeny of the Hydrozoa family, researchers are still unsure where the exact origins of the genus may be. It is also extremely rare for jellyfish to fossilize which makes it that much more difficult to track the biogeography of a species. Scientists must find "soft fossils" which occur when a jellyfish is quickly buried under sentiment and preserved since they have no bones that can harden into fossils. These factors have all contributed to the limited knowledge about the Turritopsis genus but researchers believe the origin of the entire genus occurred somewhere in the Mediterranean sea due to a speciation event. The genus was first discovered in 1895 but without modern genetic research and DNA testing, the actual species were not distinguishable until the mid-1990s. Up until DNA tests were used, the crimson jellyfish, Turritopisis rubra, was believed to have shared the same unique ability as its close relative, Turritopsis dohrnii, commonly known as the immortal jellyfish. Turritopsis dohrnii has the ability to revert its own lifecycle to avoid senescence and theoretically live forever under the right conditions.

== Habitat ==
The crimson jellyfish can be spotted in large swarms in almost any coastal shallow waters in the Southeastern Pacific including large populated areas in temperate or tropical waters. This is especially common during the summer months between December and March because the jellyfish prefers warmer waters in a temperature range of 14–25 °C (57–77 °F). Polyps can be commonly found around docks, marinas, vessels, and the ocean floor as long as their preferred pressure range is not exceeded. For both jellyfish in the polyp and medusae stage, a pressure range of 18–40 PSI is preferred. The Turritopsis genus prefers similar conditions worldwide and has a slightly larger range of water temperatures that can be tolerated.

== Mating and maternal care ==
Turritopsis rubra has a similar mating pattern to many other species of jellyfish. At dusk or dawn of each day, large groups of mature medusae gather to mate. The size of each gathering depends on proximity, light, and food abundance and is full of male and female jellies. The more adults can grow during these events, the more offspring they can produce. Because crimson jellyfish commonly distribute their polyps in a precise habitat, swarms are common and so is mating. After the group gathers, males release large quantities of sperm and females release unfertilized eggs into the open water. This means that there is typically large amounts of reproductive material within large swarms of these jellyfish. Turritopsis rubra demonstrates a unique aspect of maternal care when the gathering ends as mothers will pick up any eggs they can and attach them at the base of their umbrellas. These eggs will then form into larvae which stay with the mother until they have matured into polyps and can detach to find a suitable habitat. The polyps then travel in large colonies together and float until they find a suitable surface to attach themselves to.

== Diet ==
The crimson jellyfish's diet is unique, like many of the Hydrozoa class, because they are omnivores, which is very rare in the animal kingdom. Only about 3% of the animal kingdom are omnivores, including humans. The creature consumes both animals and other plants alike as long as the target is small enough to be eaten. Their diet consists of animals such as cretaceous zooplankton, copepods, fish eggs, mollusks, and larvae. The larvae preyed on can include larvae of other jellyfish species as jellyfish are often both prey and predator across species. The crimson jelly also consumes small phytoplankton such as diatoms and algae. The size of the jellyfish is its limiting factor when searching for food because the creature is so small. Jellyfish are also extremely simple creatures with very few organs, this leads to efficiency in their daily routines. This is why jellyfish consume food and excrete waste from the same entry point in their bodies. The crimson jellyfish uses its mouth to both consume food and excrete waste. The mouth is located directly under the gonads and stomach with no other parts of a digestive tract being needed for this process.

== Predation ==
Small jellyfish are often preyed on because of their simple composition. The crimson jellyfish is no exception being made up of only 5% matter and 95% water. Without any defense mechanisms towards larger predators and a top speed of only about 8 kilometres per hour (5 mph), the crimson jellyfish is prone to high levels of predation. Predators can differ based on location, but are common regardless of environment. In deeper waters, larger jellyfish and fish such as tuna, swordfish, and even some shark species can hunt large swarms of crimson jellies. In shallow coastal waters, predators can range from seals, to penguins, and even sea turtles. On the ocean floor, the Turritopsis rubra faces masses of sea anemones which can threaten both medusae and polyps. Although the jellyfish has no defense mechanisms or behavioral patterns to defend itself, the speed of its reproduction abilities keep the Southeastern Pacific well populated.

== Genomic analysis ==
The original genus of Turritopsis was thought to have been discovered and charted in 1895 but, without modern DNA sequencing, the individual species were almost impossible to tell apart. Before the mid-1990s, the entire Turritopsis genome was classified as Turritopsis nutricula including the Turritopsis dohrnii, or immortal jellyfish. Because of this indistinguishability, the entire genome was assumed to have shared the rare ability to be "biologically immortal" Genomic analysis on the sequencing of mRNA and mitochondria has allowed for the distinction between species and has been used to determine the actual process of "biological immortality". The Turritopsis rubra was identified in 2022 by student researcher Andrew Esber at the University of Auckland.
