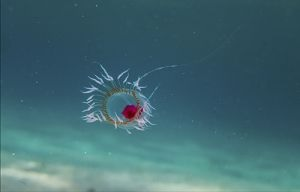
- Turritopsis dohrnii medusa

Scientific classification
- Kingdom: Animalia
- Phylum: Cnidaria
- Class: Hydrozoa
- Order: Anthoathecata
- Family: Oceaniidae
- Genus: Turritopsis
- Species: T. dohrnii

Binomial name
- Turritopsis dohrnii (Weismann, 1883)

Synonyms
- Cytaeis polystyla Will, 1844; Dendroclava dohrnii Weismann, 1883

= Turritopsis dohrnii =

Immortal jellyfish

Species of small, biologically immortal jellyfish

Turritopsis dohrnii, commonly known as the immortal jellyfish, is a species of small, biologically immortal Medusozoa (jellyfish) found worldwide in temperate to tropic waters. It is one of the few known cases of an animal capable of completely reverting to a sexually immature, sedentary polyps colonial stage after having reached sexual maturity as a solitary individual.

Like most other hydrozoans, T. dohrnii begin their lives as tiny, free-swimming larvae known as planulae. As a planula settles down, it gives rise to a colony of polyps that are attached to the sea floor. All the polyps and medusa arising from a single planula are clones. The polyps form into an extensively branched form, which is not commonly seen in most jellyfish. Jellyfish, also known as medusae, then bud off these polyps and continue their life in a free-swimming form, eventually becoming sexually mature. When sexually mature, they are known to prey on other jellyfish species at a rapid pace. If the T. dohrnii jellyfish is exposed to environmental stress, physical assault, or is sick or old, it can revert to the polyp stage, forming a new polyp colony. It does this through the cell development process of transdifferentiation, which alters the differentiated state of the cells and transforms them into new types of cells.

Theoretically, this process can go on indefinitely, effectively rendering the jellyfish biologically immortal, although in practice individuals can still die. In nature, most Turritopsis dohrnii are likely to succumb to predation or disease in the medusa stage without reverting to the polyp form.

The capability of biological immortality with no maximum lifespan makes T. dohrnii an important target of basic biological aging and pharmaceutical research.

== Taxonomy ==
The species was formerly considered conspecific with T. nutricula before being reclassified as a separate species. It was named in 1883 in honour of Anton Dohrn, the founder of the Stazione Zoologica Anton Dohrn in Naples, Italy.

Until a 2006 study, it was thought that Turritopsis rubra and Turritopsis nutricula were the same species as Turritopsis dohrnii. It is not known whether or not T. rubra medusae can also transform back into polyps.

== Description ==
The medusa of Turritopsis dohrnii is bell-shaped made of mesoglea, with a maximum diameter of about 4.5 millimetres (0.18 in) and is about as tall as it is wide. The mesoglea in the walls of the bell is uniformly thin, except for some thickening at the apex. The relatively large stomach is bright red and has a cruciform shape in cross section. Young specimens 1 mm in diameter have only eight tentacles evenly spaced out along the edge, whereas adult specimens have 80–90 tentacles. The medusa (jellyfish) is free-living in the plankton. Dense nerve net cells are also present in the epidermis in the cap. They form a large ring-like structure above the radial canal commonly presented in cnidarians.

Turritopsis dohrnii also has a bottom-living polyp form, or hydroid, which consists of stolons that run along the substrate and upright branches with feeding polyps that can produce medusa buds. These polyps develop over a few days into tiny 1 mm medusae, which are liberated and swim free from the parent hydroid colony.

== Distribution and invasion ==
Turritopsis is believed to have originated in the Pacific, but has spread all over the world through trans-Arctic migrations, and has speciated into several populations that are not easy to distinguish morphologically, but whose species distinctions have recently been verified by a study and comparison of mitochondrial ribosomal gene sequences. Turritopsis are found in temperate to tropical regions in all of the world's oceans. Turritopsis is believed to be spreading across the world through ballast water discharge. Unlike other species invasions which caused serious economic and ecological consequences, T. dohrnii's invasion around the world was unnoticed due to their tiny size and innocuity. "We are looking at a worldwide silent invasion", said Smithsonian Tropical Marine Institute scientist Maria Miglietta. Turritopsis are able to withstand extreme conditions, such as lack of food and harsh environments which would normally be fatal due to their ability to regress into a cluster of cells, possibly being carried by water currents. It is in this way that this species has invaded many environments by being so ecologically efficient and stronger than competing species.

== Life cycle ==
The eggs develop in gonads of female medusae, which are located in the walls of the manubrium (stomach). Mature eggs are presumably spawned and fertilized in the sea by sperm produced and released by male medusae, as is the case for most hydromedusae. However, the related species Turritopsis rubra seems to retain fertilized eggs until the planula stage. Fertilized eggs develop into planula larvae, which settle onto the sea floor (or even the rich marine communities that live on floating docks), and develop into polyp colonies (hydroids). The hydroids bud new jellyfish, which are released at about one millimetre in size and then grow and feed in the plankton, becoming sexually mature after a few weeks (the exact duration depends on the ocean temperature; at 20 °C (68 °F) it is 25 to 30 days and at 22 °C (72 °F) it is 18 to 22 days). Medusae of T. dohrnii are able to survive between 14 and 25 °C (57 and 77 °F).

=== Biological immortality ===
Most jellyfish species have a relatively fixed lifespan, which varies by species from hours to many months (long-lived mature jellyfish spawn every day or night; the time is also fairly fixed and species-specific). The medusa of Turritopsis dohrnii is the only form known to have the ability to return to a polyp state, by a specific transdifferentiation process that requires the presence of certain cell types (tissue from both the jellyfish bell surface and the circulatory canal system).

Experiments have revealed that all stages of the medusae, from newly released to fully mature individuals, can transform back into polyps under the conditions of starvation, sudden temperature change, reduction of salinity, and artificial damage of the bell with forceps or scissors. The transforming medusa is characterized first by deterioration of the bell, mesoglea, and tentacles. All immature medusa (with 12 tentacles at most) then turn into a cyst-like stage and proceed to transform into stolons and polyps. However, about 20–40% of mature medusa instead proceed to the stolons and polyps stage without passing the cyst-like stage. Polyps are formed 2 days after stolons have developed and fed. Polyps further multiply by growing additional stolons, branches, and then polyps to form colonial hydroids. In one experiment, they would eventually transform into stolons and polyps and begin their lives once again, even in the absence of environmental changes or injury.

This ability to reverse the biotic cycle (in response to adverse conditions) is unique in the animal kingdom. It allows the jellyfish to bypass death, rendering Turritopsis dohrnii potentially biologically immortal. The process has not been observed in their natural habitat, in part because the process is quite rapid and because field observations at the right moment are unlikely. Regardless, most individual medusae are likely to fall victim to the general hazards of life as mesoplankton, including being eaten by predators or succumbing to disease.

The species possesses unique mechanisms related to telomere maintenance, which play a significant role in its regenerative abilities. T. dohrnii maintains telomere length through specific cellular processes during its life cycle reversal, effectively resetting cellular aging.

The species' cell development method of transdifferentiation has inspired scientists to find a way to use this process to renew damaged or dead tissue in humans.

It was first discovered in 1992 that the jellyfish is immortal, after an Italian scientist accidentally left them to starve over a weekend.

== Ecology ==
=== Diet ===
Turritopsis dohrnii are a carnivorous species that commonly feed on zooplankton. Their diet mainly consists of plankton, fish eggs and small mollusks. T. dohrnii ingests food and excretes waste through the mouth. T. dohrnii hunts by using its tentacles as it drifts through the water. Its tentacles, which contain stinging cells called nematocysts, spread and sting its prey. The tentacles can then flex to direct its prey to the mouth. T. dohrnii, like other jellyfish, may use its bell to catch its prey. T. dohrnii's bell will expand, sucking in water, as it propels itself to swim. This expansion of the bell brings potential prey in closer reach of the tentacles.

=== Predation ===
Turritopsis dohrnii, like other jellyfish, are preyed on most commonly by other jellyfish. Other predators of T. dohrnii include sea anemones, tuna, sharks, swordfish, sea turtles, and penguins. Many species prey on T. dohrnii and other jellyfish due to their simple composition. They are only approximately 5% non-aqueous matter, and the remaining part is composed of water. They are composed of three layers - an outer layer (the epidermis), a middle layer (mesoglea - a thick, jelly-like substance), and an inner layer (gastrodermis).

=== Habitat ===
Turritopsis dohrnii was first discovered in the Mediterranean Sea but has since been found worldwide. T. dohrnii is generally found living in temperate to tropical waters. They can be found in marinas or docks, on vessel hulls, and on the ocean floor. They typically live in a salinity range of polyhaline (18–30 PSU) and euhaline (30–40 PSU).

== Genomic analysis ==
Genomic analyses such as sequence analysis on mRNA or mitochondria DNA have been employed to investigate its lifecycle. mRNA analysis of each life stage showed that a stage-specific gene in the medusae stage is expressed tenfold more than in other stages. This gene is relative to a Wnt signal that can induce a regeneration process upon injury.

Analysis of nucleotide sequence homologs and protein homologs identified Nemopsis bachei as the species' closest relative. None of the closely related species display biological immortality.

In 2022, a study reported the key molecular mechanisms of rejuvenation they found in a comparison of the newly presented genomes of this biologically immortal jellyfish and a similar but non-rejuvenating jellyfish, involving e.g. DNA replication and repair, and stem cell renewal.

== Culturing ==
Keeping T. dohrnii in captivity is quite difficult. Currently, only one scientist, Shin Kubota from Kyoto University, has managed to sustain a group of these jellyfish for a prolonged period of time. The plankton must be inspected daily to ensure that they have properly digested the Artemia cysts they are being fed. Kubota reported that during a two-year period, his colony rebirthed itself 11 times. Kubota regularly appears on Japanese television to talk about his immortal jellyfish and has recorded several songs about them, often singing them at the end of his conference presentations.

== In popular culture ==
Turritopsis Dohrnii Teo En Ming, a perennial candidate in Singaporean elections, legally changed his name after the jellyfish.

== See also ==
- Hydra – another kind of cnidarian that is claimed to be immortal
- Mnemiopsis – another kind of invertebrate that is claimed to be immortal
- List of longest-living organisms
