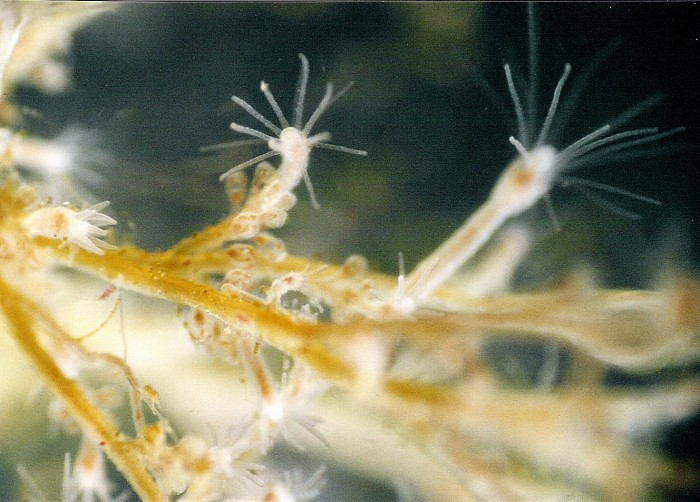
- Bougainvillia muscus

Scientific classification
- Kingdom: Animalia
- Phylum: Cnidaria
- Class: Hydrozoa
- Order: Anthoathecata
- Family: Bougainvilliidae
- Genus: Bougainvillia
- Species: B. muscus

Binomial name
- Bougainvillia muscus Allman, 1863

= Bougainvillia muscus =

Species of hydrozoan

Bougainvillia muscus is a marine invertebrate, a species of hydroid in the suborder Anthomedusae.

== Taxonomy ==
In 1844, van Beneden named the hydroid form of this species as Eudendrium ramosum. Strethill Wright showed that it did not belong in the genus Eudendrium and placed it in Atractylis. Later Allman placed it in Bougainvillia based on its similarity to Bougainvillia britannica. Strethill Wright reared some medusae to maturity and decided that the species was in fact Bougainvillia britannica. However, confusion remained because the three hydroid forms, B. ramosa, B. fruticosa and B. muscus were so similar. The name B. ramosa has been widely used for this species in the past but B. muscus is now the accepted name.

== Description ==
B. muscus is a colonial hydroid forming irregular, straggling branched bushes. The individual polyps have two rings of tentacles pointing alternately upwards and downwards. The colony may grow to about 120 millimetres in height with polyps up to three millimetres long. The hydranths are cylindrical or fusiform and are bright red or pink.

The form of the hydroid is very variable and this was one of the reasons for the taxonomic confusion. In the "muscus" form, single polyps or short branches emerge from a stolon. In the "fruticosa" form, the hydrocaulis is much branched and grows to fifty millimetres in height. The perisarc rises to the base of the tentacles which may form a corrugated or membranous cup. In the "ramosa" form, this cup is larger and the hydranth can almost completely retreat inside it. These forms are environmentally induced forms and all three can be derived from the "muscus" form.

== Distribution and habitat ==
The hydroid B. muscus is widely distributed around the British Isles. It favours sheltered waters and is tolerant of low salinity levels. The medusae have been recorded around the coasts of Britain, the North Sea, Norway, south-west Ireland, the Isles of Scilly, the Bay of Biscay, the Mediterranean Sea and near Rhode Island in the United States.

== Biology ==
The B. muscus hydroid buds and forms medusae by asexual reproduction. When these mature, sexual reproduction occurs, the fertilised eggs settle out and new hydroids are formed.

The hydroid grows rapidly and may start to produce medusae when as little as seven weeks old. The medusae grow on the side branches and become free-swimming when they are released. At first they are less than one millimetre in diameter but soon swell and the umbrella becomes globular in shape. There is a short stomach and sometimes an umbilical canal. There are four short, unbranched oral tentacles which are usually turned up. There are four radial canals and four marginal bulbs, each with two tentacles. At the base of these tentacles there are single ocelli. The stomach and marginal bulbs are pink or yellowish-brown while the ocelli are black or dark red. As the medusa grows, the oral tentacles branch but the general form of the medusa remains much the same.

The gonads develop on the margins and may extend onto the underside of the umbrella beside the radial canals. Ripe ova can be found on mature medusae.
