= Hippocrene (disambiguation) =

Hippocrene may refer to:

- 5085 Hippocrene, an asteroid
- Hippocrene, a spring in Greek mythology
- Hippocrene, a synonym for a genus of hydrozoans, Bougainvillia
- Hippocrene Books, a publisher
