= Bougainvillia crassa =

Scientific classification
- Domain: Eukaryota
- Kingdom: Animalia
- Phylum: Cnidaria
- Class: Hydrozoa
- Order: Anthoathecata
- Family: Bougainvilliidae
- Genus: Bougainvillia
- Species: B. crassa

Binomial name
- Bougainvillia crassa Frassa, 1938

Species of hydrozoan

Bougainvillia crassa is a marine invertebrate, a species of hydroid in the suborder Anthomedusae. It was first described by Frassa in 1938.
