= Turritopsis lata =

Scientific classification
- Kingdom: Animalia
- Phylum: Cnidaria
- Class: Hydrozoa
- Order: Anthoathecata
- Family: Oceaniidae
- Genus: Turritopsis
- Species: T. lata

Binomial name
- Turritopsis lata Lendenfeld, 1885

Species of hydrozoan

Turritopsis lata is a species of hydrozoan of the family Oceaniidae.
