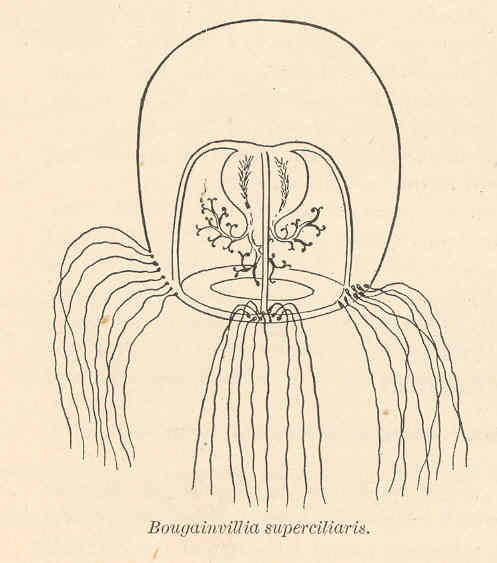

Scientific classification
- Kingdom: Animalia
- Phylum: Cnidaria
- Class: Hydrozoa
- Order: Anthoathecata
- Family: Bougainvilliidae
- Genus: Bougainvillia
- Species: B. superciliaris

Binomial name
- Bougainvillia superciliaris (L. Agassiz, 1849)"Report". Integrated Taxonomic Information System.

Synonyms
- Hippocrene superciliaris; Bougainvillia paradoxa Mereschowsky

= Bougainvillia superciliaris =

Species of hydrozoan

Bougainvillia superciliaris is a marine invertebrate, a species of athecate hydroid. It belongs to the Bougainvillidae family. It can be confused with Rathkea octopunctata, but differs from it in four bundles of tentacles of the outer circle.

== Distribution ==
This hydromedusae relates to сircumpolar Arctic-boreal species. It is found in the seas of the Arctic basin (Barents sea, Kara sea, Bering sea), in north Atlantic, in the North Pacific. In the White sea this jellyfish is ubiquitous, but more numerous in shallow water lips. Polypoid generation in the White sea practically is poorly investigated

== Morphology ==
The bell is transparent and has a spherical shape. Its size is 4–8 mm (maximum 9.5 ;mm) in adult jellyfish. Recently appeared jellyfish are 1–2 ;mm. Tentacles are arranged in groups. Four extended bases on the edge of the bell carry 11–22 tentacles. One black eye is located at the base of each tentacle. Common expanded bases of tentacles are brownish. Manubrium is brown with reddish tinge, darker in males and whitish in females after forming eggs and planulas on it. Short and wide oral proboscis carries a mouth with four bundles of oral tentacles. They are short, dichotomically branched and end with a group of stinging cells. Mouth leads to a bulky stomach, cross-shaped in cross-section. It can open the entire width of the stomach or almost completely close. Gonads are formed on the oral proboscis. Polyps carry filamentous tentacles.

== Feeding ==
This jellyfish feed on various planktonic crustaceans: Cirripedia nauplii, adult Copepods Oithona similis and Microsetella norvegica, larval stages of Copepods Pseudocalanus minutus and other crustaceans.

== Reproduction ==
Gestation of eggs by females is timed to the warming up period of surface layers of the sea, when the temperature rises to 10–15 °C. By the end of June eggs turn into ciliated planula larvae, which start an independent life in the water column. At this time jellyfish stop eating, the walls of their stomachs are thinning, and their tentacles stick together and hang motionless. Planula settle and form bottom colonies. Jellyfish exhibits both asexual and sexual reproduction by budding during hydroid stage and releasing gametes in medusae stages.

== Behaviour ==
Most of the time jellyfish hangs in the water column or it is carried over by tidal currents near the surface of the sea. Tentacles are spread out and form a wide cone. Periods of rest alternate with periods of activity when jellyfish with spiral twisted tentacles swim from place to place. Planktonic crustaceans encounter stinging cells on tentacles of the outer circle of the jellyfish. Then jellyfish bends the edge of the bell and passes the victim to the inner circle of tentacles, after which it opens its mouth and, smoothly moving the victim in the cluster of tentacles of the inner circle, swallows the prey.

== Ecology ==
Jellyfish are found regularly in May and June. In sunny quiet days they are numerous at the very surface of the sea. In cloudy or windy days, jellyfish are usually not visible. Seen to be preyed on by Aequorea and other medusivorous hydromedusae.
