= Bougainvillia aberrans =

Scientific classification
- Kingdom: Animalia
- Phylum: Cnidaria
- Class: Hydrozoa
- Order: Anthoathecata
- Family: Bougainvilliidae
- Genus: Bougainvillia
- Species: B. aberrans

Binomial name
- Bougainvillia aberrans Calder, 1993

Species of hydrozoan

Bougainvillia aberrans is a marine invertebrate, a species of hydroid in the suborder Anthomedusae. It was first described by Dale Calder in 1993. They have four radical clusters of marginal tentacles. Bougainvillia aberrans is found in Bermuda in the western North Atlantic Ocean.

== Description ==
Bougainvillia aberrans consists of the hydroid colony with soft curly perisarc polysiphonic hydrocaulus, hydranths including 16 tentacles maximum, and medusa buds. Hydroid is part of the Cnidaria phylum. So, B. aberrans are radial symmetry, that they have cnidae that are unique sting structures unique to this phylum. Bougainvillia aberrans is different from other hydranths species because B. abberans have a lengthy spindled manubrium, negligible tentacles, and survive for a short period. In the sense that different from other with known species in all. This species is characterized as comparatively large size, about 20 mm width as well as height, and large amounts of folded hanging gonads from the wall around the circumference to the proximal area of the radial canals. Also, The edge tentacles have extinct species, and the oral tentacles have anti-inflammatory properties.

== Distribution and habitat ==
Hydroid species Bougainvillia aberrans distribute from shallow water to deep sea in the Bermuda area. Members of the genus are found in all seas, but most of the known species are found in the Atlantic Ocean. In the western North Atlantic Ocean, southeast of Castle Roads, this species was collected with a depth of 300 meters.

== Biology ==
Hydroid colonies arise or stand upright due to creeping hydrorhiza. Monosiphonic or polysiphonic hydrocaulus are companions of erect colonies. Bougainvillia aberrans is distinguishable in the sense that the degree of reduction of its medusa is unique compared to species of same genus. Moreover, B. aberrans is suppressed in the medusa stage. Hydroids of B. aberrans feed on fragments of other cnidarians. Cnidaria have a centered mouth surrounded by tentacles. Also, they are carnivorous. In terms of reproduction, gametes were released before or shortly after the release of the mediating from the hydroid. Bougainvillia aberrans n. sp. has holotype and paratype. Also, medusae of B. aberrans appear sexually mature and relatively short-lived for release from the hydroid. It is different from the reduced Medusa buds with its blunt marginal tentacles. Furthermore, the perisarc of B. aberrans is clear and not covered with mud or sand. The latest B. aberrans eggs are surrounded by envelopes with tiny heterotrichous microbasic eurytele nematocysts. The exoskeleton of Hydroid and Bougainvillidae family starts as epidermal secretions. Coenosarc, which is the epithelial epidermal layer consists of various cell types of Hydroid.
