= Hydroid =

Hydroid may refer to:

== Biology ==
- Hydroid (botany), a type of vascular cell that occurs in certain bryophytes
- Hydroid (zoology), a life stage for most animals of the class Hydrozoa
- Hedgehog or orange hydroid, a common name for some species in the hydrozoan genus Garveia

== Business ==
- Hydroid Inc., an autonomous underwater vehicle manufacturer
