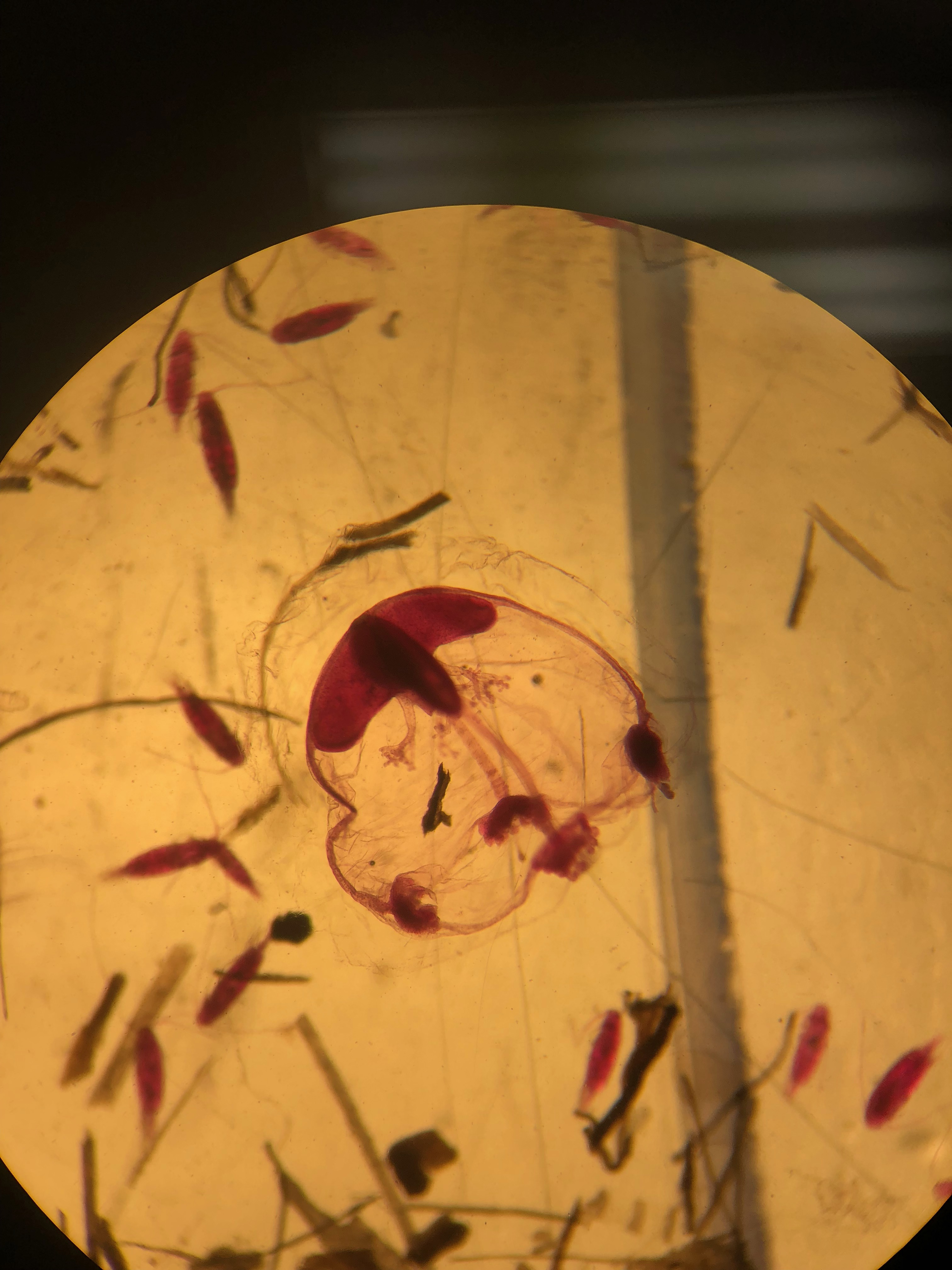

Scientific classification
- Kingdom: Animalia
- Phylum: Cnidaria
- Class: Hydrozoa
- Order: Anthoathecata
- Family: Bougainvilliidae
- Genus: Nemopsis
- Species: N. bachei

Binomial name
- Nemopsis bachei L. Agassiz, 1849

= Nemopsis bachei =

Species of hydrozoan

Nemopsis bachei is a species of relatively small gelatinous zooplankton hydrozoa found in both marine and estuarine environments. This particular species was first found and described by Louis Agassiz in 1849 from samples that were taken from the coast of Massachusetts. It was also noted and described in 1857 by another name off the coast of South Carolina.

As part of the phylum Cnidaria they are mainly gelatinous with their most identifying characteristic being the gonads which, viewed from above, look like an X and then continue down the sides lining up with the radial canals. As a part of the zooplankton, it is incapable of sustained horizontal movement and relies on its tentacles to encounter and capture smaller organisms for food (feeds mainly on copepedites, selecting against naupilar stages). Like most living organisms, N. bachei has communities of bacteria that associate with it. The commonly found groups include Vibrio spp. and Photobacterium spp. According to genetic analysis, researchers have found that N. bachei is closely related to a species of "immortal jellyfish", Turritopsis nutricula based on analysis of the COX1 gene.

== Description ==
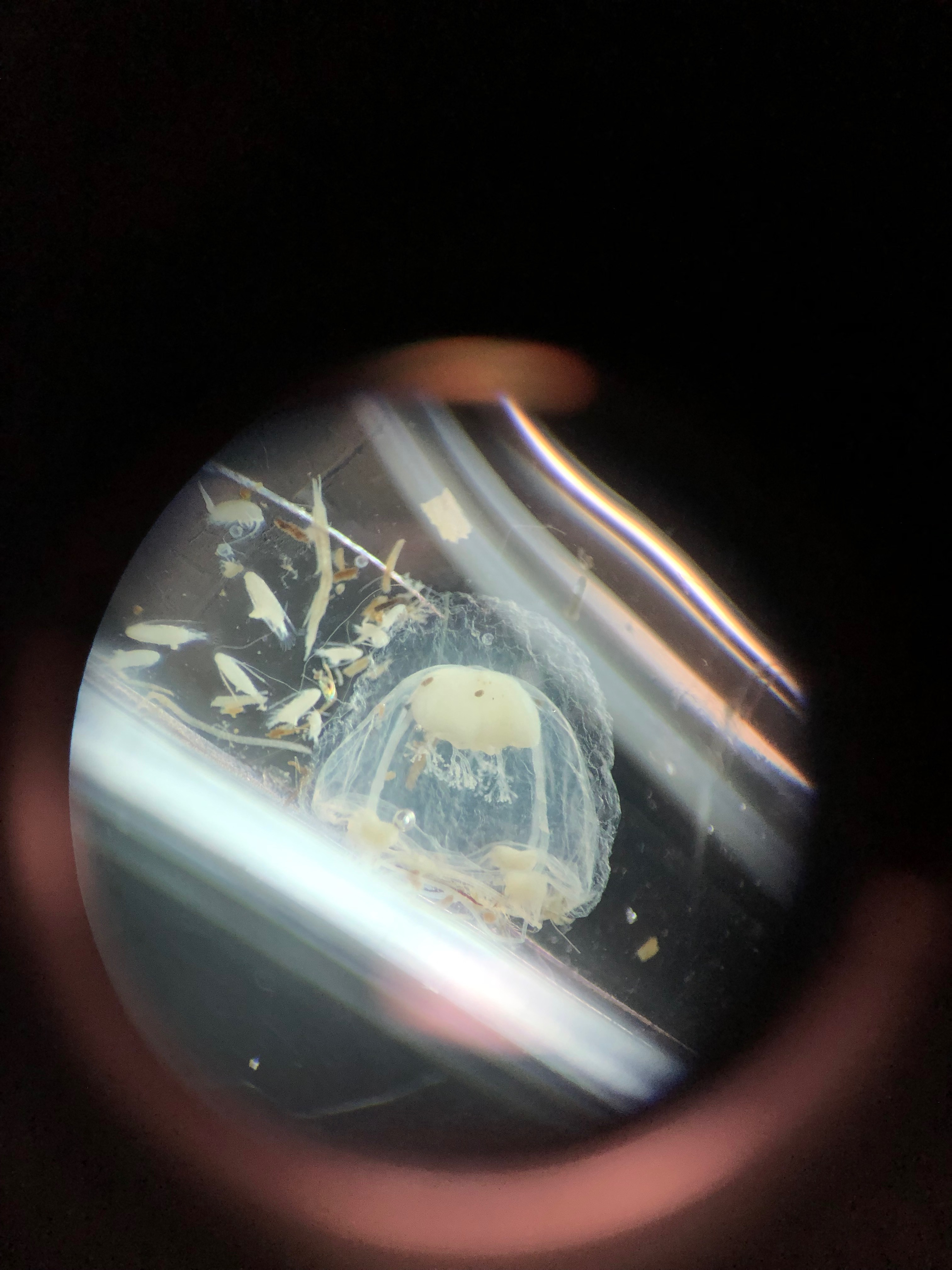
N. bachei picture taken through a microscope. Naturally colored with no stain added

Like many other medusae, it moves in a pulsating manner in the bell. N. bachei has been described as “fast-swimming” due to a greater value than others found in engineering studies. It has a rounded, cube-like bell ranging from 0.4 to 12 mm. Its most notable characteristic are the 4 ribbon-shaped gonads which extend down the bell along the radial canals, at times all the way down to the base. They also have two short, distinct, club-like tentacles extending from each of their 4 marginal bulbs. These marginal bulbs also contain ocelli or light sensing organs. On each of the marginal bulbs they have 14-18 longer thin tentacles that extend downward.

== Feeding ==
Cnidaria are often studied to investigate their grazing rates in relation to smaller zooplankton because cnidarian's are subject to large blooms. While they do consume a substantial amount of zooplankton when at peak abundance, due to the regeneration rate of copepidite stocks, N. bachei were not found to have a lasting effect on the overall population. They do display some amount of predatory behavior; studies have shown they seek out new areas of prey when the rate at which they encounter prey starts to get decrease.

== Distribution ==
In the southeast, these organisms are found typically in the colder months ranging from November–February. Other reports indicate they may also be found during the spring-summer months in the North Atlantic. It has been documented as native to the eastern coast of the US and the Gulf of Mexico and recently has been found to be an invasive species in the coastal waters of Northern Europe. Additionally, it can be found in waters of variable salinity in Germany, and was likely transported there by ships. In general, they can be found in waters ranging from sub-tropical to cold-temperate in both the Atlantic and Pacific oceans typically in euryhaline waters ~14-26 degrees C and in salinities ranging from 5-30 ppt.
