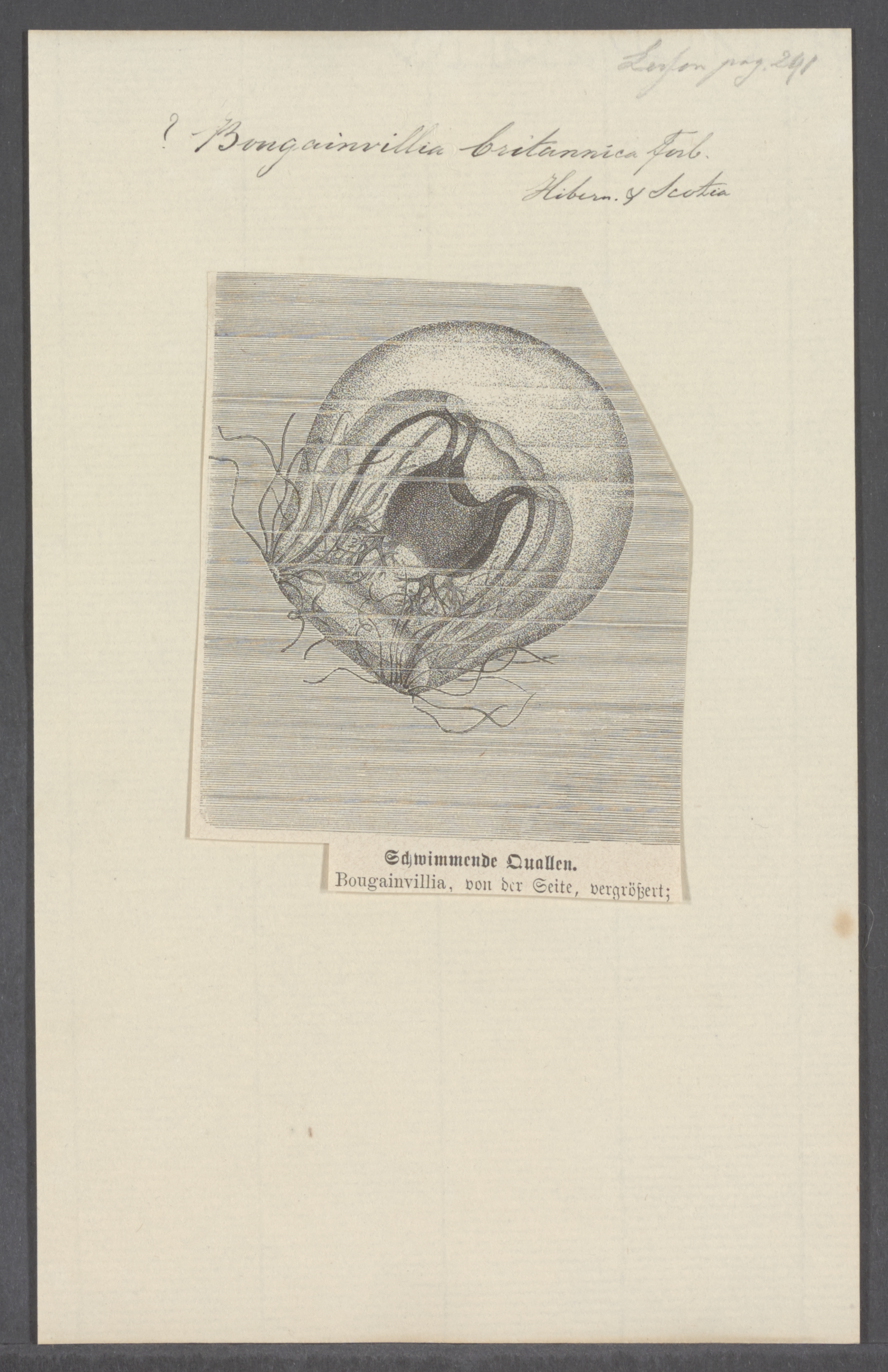

Scientific classification
- Domain: Eukaryota
- Kingdom: Animalia
- Phylum: Cnidaria
- Class: Hydrozoa
- Order: Anthoathecata
- Family: Bougainvilliidae
- Genus: Bougainvillia
- Species: B. britannica

Binomial name
- Bougainvillia britannica Forbes, 1841

Synonyms
- Atractylis linearis Alder, 1862; Bougainvillia flavida Hartlaub, 1887

= Bougainvillia britannica =

Species of hydrozoan

Bougainvillia britannica is a marine invertebrate, a species of hydroid in the suborder Anthomedusae.

== Description ==
The polyp grows singly from a stolon or has a few branches. It has long pedicels and medusa buds develop in clusters on branched stalks. The young medusae have very narrow subumbrellas.

The medusa has thick jelly and no peduncle. The four oral tentacles are long and branch four or five times as the medusa grows, and the oval ocelli are situated on the base of the tentacles. There are four bulbs on the margin of the umbrella with 12 to 17 tentacles on each bulb.

== Distribution and habitat ==
B. britannica is found in the north east Atlantic Ocean and the North Sea, particularly round the shores of Britain and Ireland, Belgium and the Netherlands. A record from the Mediterranean Sea is believed to be a misidentification.

== Biology ==
The B. britannica hydroid buds and forms medusae by asexual reproduction. When these mature, sexual reproduction occurs, the fertilised eggs settle out and new hydroids are formed.
