= Silhouetta =

Scientific classification
- Kingdom: Animalia
- Phylum: Cnidaria
- Class: Hydrozoa
- Order: Anthoathecata
- Family: Bougainvilliidae
- Genus: Silhouetta; Millard & Bouillon, 1973
- Species: S. uvacarpa

Binomial name
- Silhouetta uvacarpa Millard & Bouillon, 1973

Genus of hydrozoans

Silhouetta is a monotypic genus of hydrozoans belonging to the family Bougainvilliidae. The only species is Silhouetta uvacarpa.

The species is found in the coasts of Africa.
