= Nemopsis =

Scientific classification
- Kingdom: Animalia
- Phylum: Cnidaria
- Class: Hydrozoa
- Order: Anthoathecata
- Family: Bougainvilliidae
- Genus: Nemopsis; Agassiz, 1849

Genus of aquatic animals

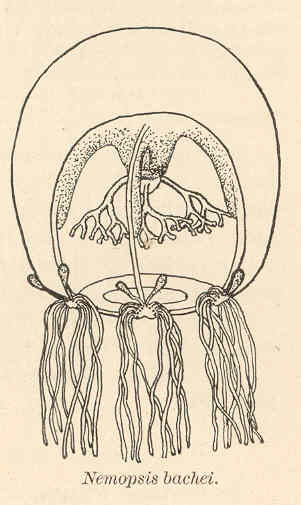
An illustration of Nemopsis bachei from the genus Nemopsis

Nemopsis is a genus of cnidarians belonging to the family Bougainvilliidae.

The species of this genus are found in Europe and Northern America.

Species:

- Nemopsis bachei Agassiz, 1849
- Nemopsis dofleini Maas, 1909
