= Examples of in vitro transdifferentiation by initial epigenetic activation phase approach =

List:

- Human dermal fibroblasts → multilineage blood progenitors (Oct4 and cytokine treatment)
- Mouse dermal fibroblasts → polygonal hyaline chondrogenic cells (Klf4, c-Myc, Sox9)
- Mouse dermal fibroblasts → cardiomyocytes (Oct4, Sox2, Klf4, JI1 and Bmp4)
- Fibroblasts → neural stem/progenitor cells (Oct4, Sox2, c-Myc, Klf4)

== See also ==
- Transdifferentiation
- Induced stem cells
