= Bougainvillia frondosa =

Scientific classification
- Domain: Eukaryota
- Kingdom: Animalia
- Phylum: Cnidaria
- Class: Hydrozoa
- Order: Anthoathecata
- Family: Bougainvilliidae
- Genus: Bougainvillia
- Species: B. frondosa

Binomial name
- Bougainvillia frondosa Mayer, 1900

Species of hydrozoan

Bougainvillia frondosa is a marine invertebrate, a species of hydroid in the suborder Anthomedusae. It was first described by Mayer in 1900.
