= Examples of in vivo transdifferentiation by lineage-instructive approach =

List of examples of in vivo transdifferentiation through transfection

A list of examples of in vivo transdifferentiation through transfection:

- mouse hepatocytes → B cells (Pdx1)
- exocrine cells → B cells (Pdx1, Ngn3, and v-maf musculoaponeurotic fibrosarcoma oncogene family protein A)
- nonsensory cells → inner hair cells (Atoh1 and MathI)
- non cardiogenic mesoderm → cardiomyocytes (Gata4, Tbx5 and Smarcd3 or Baf60c)

Through excision:

- B-cell precursors → hematopoietic progenitors(-Pax5)
- In adult ovarian follicles, granulosa and thecal cells → functional Sertoli-like and Leydig-like cells (-Foxl1)

== See also ==
- Transdifferentiation
- Induced stem cells
