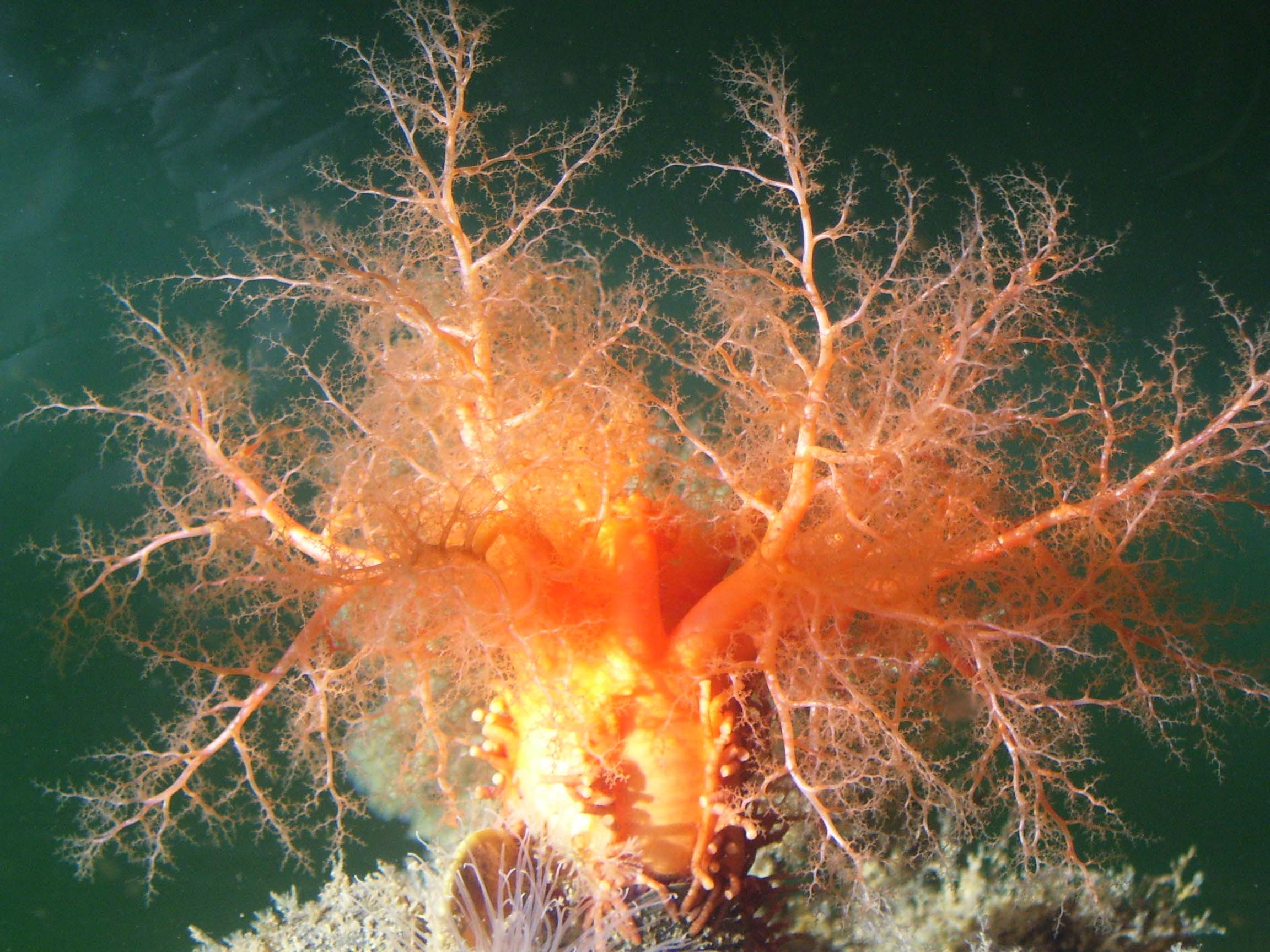

Conservation status
- Secure (NatureServe)

Scientific classification
- Kingdom: Animalia
- Phylum: Echinodermata
- Class: Holothuroidea
- Order: Dendrochirotida
- Family: Cucumariidae
- Genus: Cucumaria
- Species: C. miniata

Binomial name
- Cucumaria miniata (Brandt, 1835)

Synonyms
- Cladodactyla (Polyclados) miniata Brandt, 1835

= Cucumaria miniata =

Species of sea cucumber

Cucumaria miniata is a species of sea cucumber. It is commonly known as the orange sea cucumber or red sea cucumber due to its striking color. This northeast Pacific species is often found wedged in between rocks or crevices at the coast or on docks and can generally be identified by its orange bushy tentacles protruding above the substrate.

== Description ==
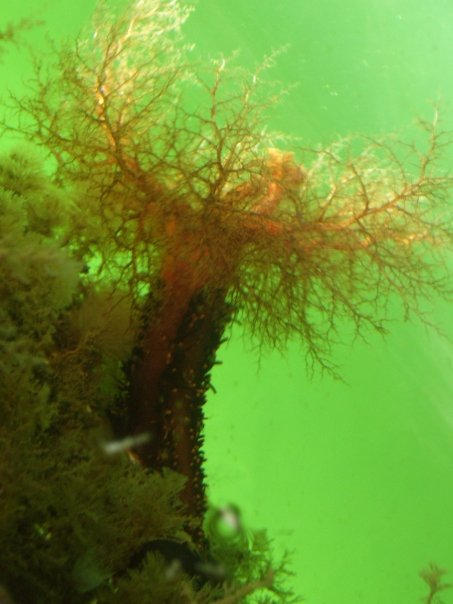
Cucumaria miniata

Cucumaria miniata is generally orange or reddish brown. They are easily identifiable by their orange coloration and branching tentacles. The body is thick and has five rows of tube feet, separated by smooth, soft skin. Pentameric radial symmetry is present in the five equally spaced rows of feet. The ossicles, which are present in all echinoderms, are small and scarcely scattered throughout the dermis. Respiration occurs through respiratory trees, two arborescent tubes in the coelom.

They have fifteen sets of feeding arms that fan out into bushy tentacles when fully extended and feed into the mouth which is controlled by a sphincter muscle. Their mouth and anus are at separate ends of the body resulting in a full digestive tract. The lower part of the body is generally wedged in a crevice so often the tentacles are the main part of the organism visible.

== Size ==
They can grow to 25 cm long with tentacles extended and can reach a diameter of 8 cm. The tentacles can reach a diameter of 15 cm.

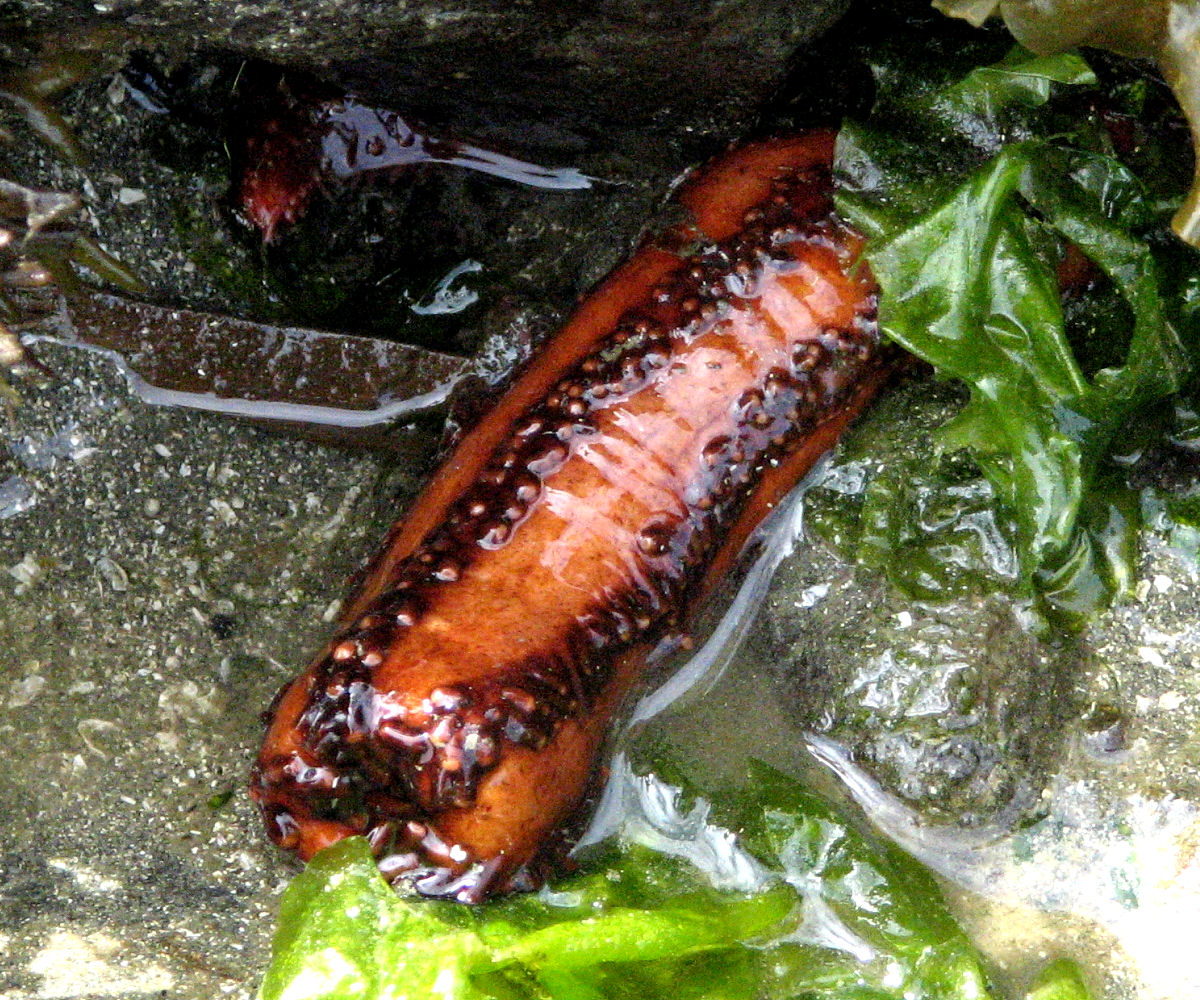
At high tide, Salt Spring Island, British Columbia

== Range and habitat ==
Cucumaria miniata can be found from northern Alaska to northern Mexico. They live in rocky areas from the intertidal zone to a depth of 100 m, and are generally found wedged in crevices on docks or between rocks. Since they have the ability to stay attached to a substrate, they tend to frequent areas with higher currents in order to avoid predation.

== Predators ==
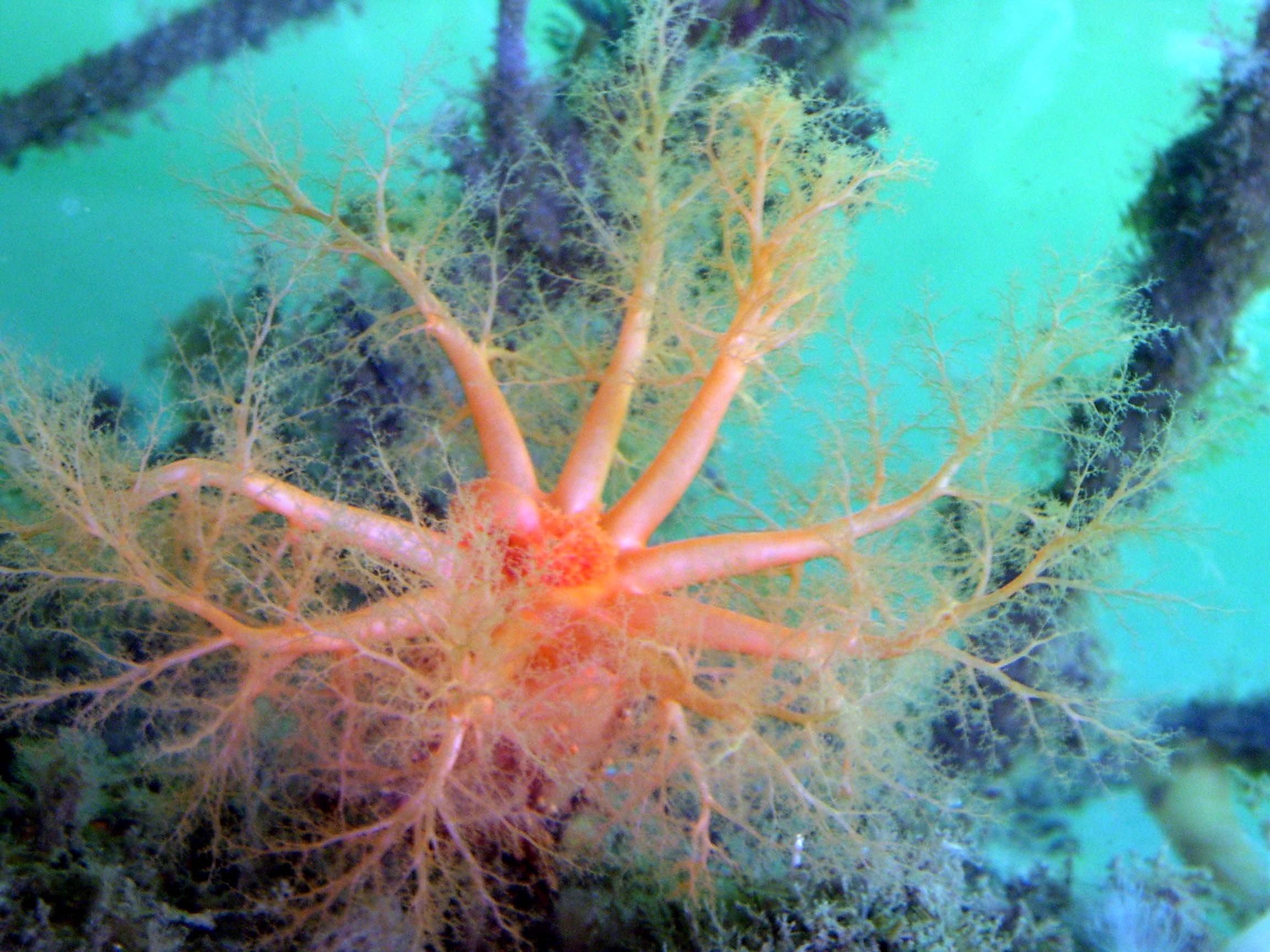
Cucumaria miniata eating

Major predators include Solaster stimpsoni (the sun star), Luidia foliolata (the sand star), and other sea stars.

== Feeding ==
Cucumaria miniata are suspension feeders. They use their bushy tentacles to capture detritus and plankton from the water column. They then pull the tentacle via the feeding arm into the mouth to remove the food. Small tentacles around the mouth also help prevent food from escaping. Their feeding greatly decreases between November and March, when there is less plankton available.

== Life history ==
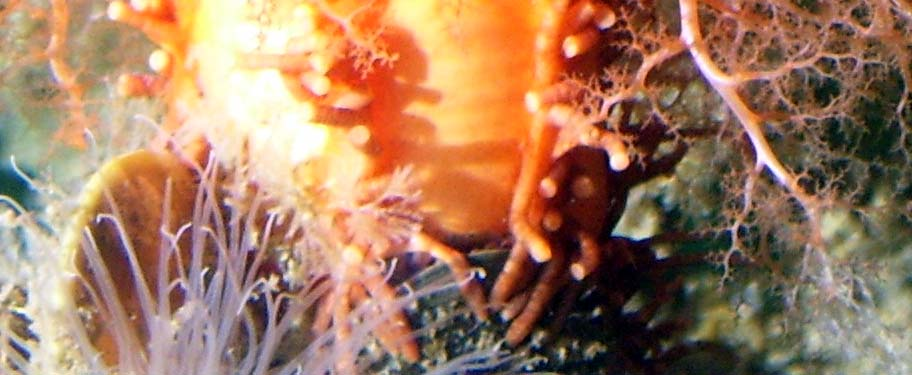
Cucumaria miniata tube feet attached to substrate

Cucumaria miniata spawn from March to May. They extend the anterior portion of their body and release eggs and sperm into the water column. The fertilized eggs develop into non-feeding larvae that move slowly and settle near adults. They can live between five and ten years.
