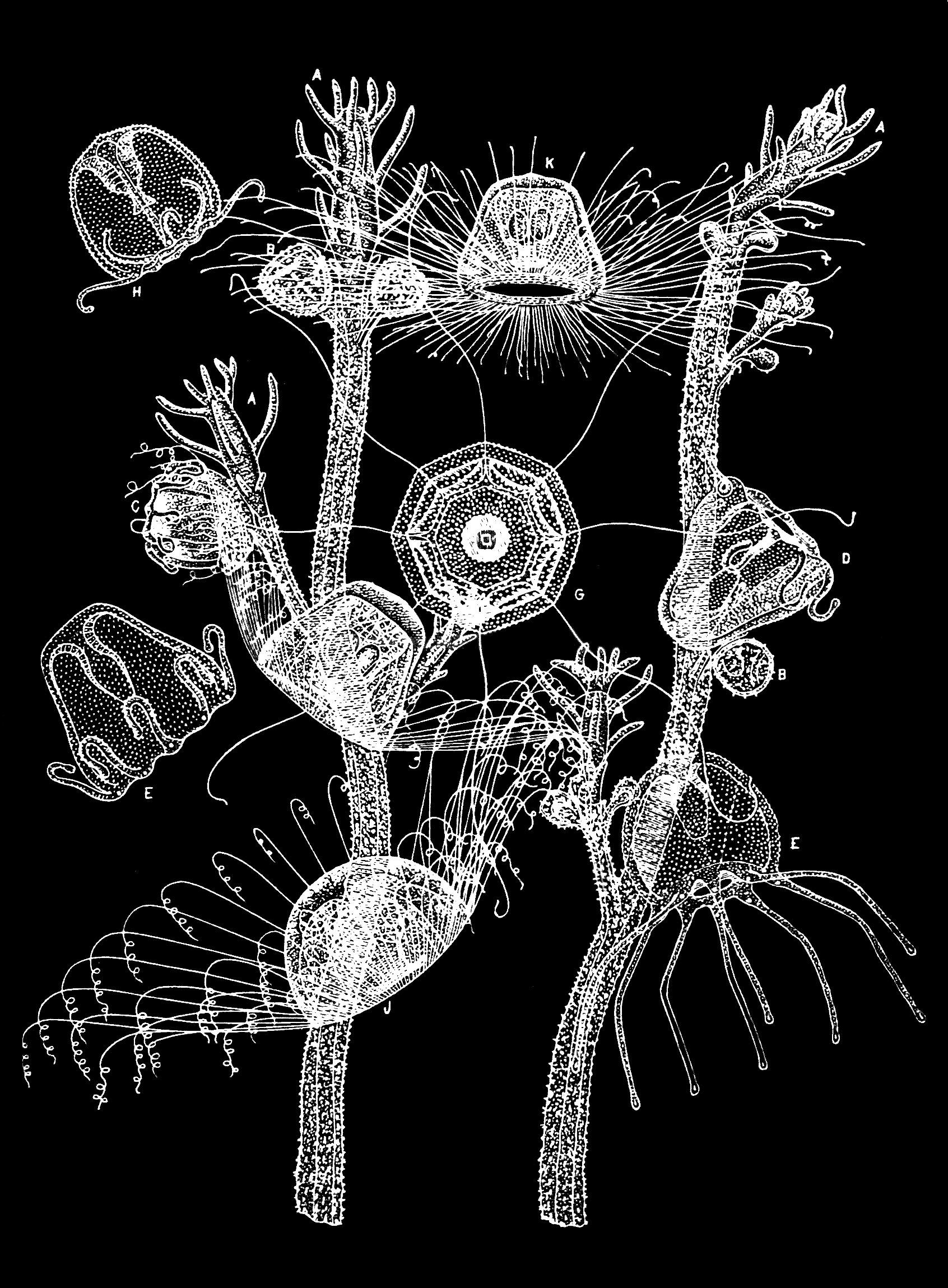

Scientific classification
- Kingdom: Animalia
- Phylum: Cnidaria
- Class: Hydrozoa
- Order: Anthoathecata
- Family: Oceaniidae
- Genus: Turritopsis; McCrady, 1857

Species
- See text

Synonyms
- Clavula Wright, 1859; Dendroclava Weismann, 1883

= Turritopsis =

Genus of hydrozoans

Turritopsis is a genus of hydrozoans in the family Oceaniidae.

== Species ==
According to the World Register of Marine Species, this genus includes the following species:

- Turritopsis chevalense (Thorneley, 1904) – species inquirenda
- Turritopsis dohrnii (Weismann, 1883) also known as the "Benjamin Button jellyfish", or the "immortal jellyfish". It can reverse its life cycle and transform itself back to a polyp.
- Turritopsis fascicularis Fraser, 1943
- Turritopsis lata Lendenfeld, 1884
- Turritopsis minor (Nutting, 1905)
- Turritopsis nutricula McCrady, 1857 (several species, including the "immortal jellyfish", were formerly classified as T. nutricula)
- Turritopsis pacifica Maas, 1909
- Turritopsis pleurostoma (Péron & Lesueur, 1809) – species inquirenda
- Turritopsis polycirrha (Keferstein, 1862)
- Turritopsis rubra Farquhar, 1895
