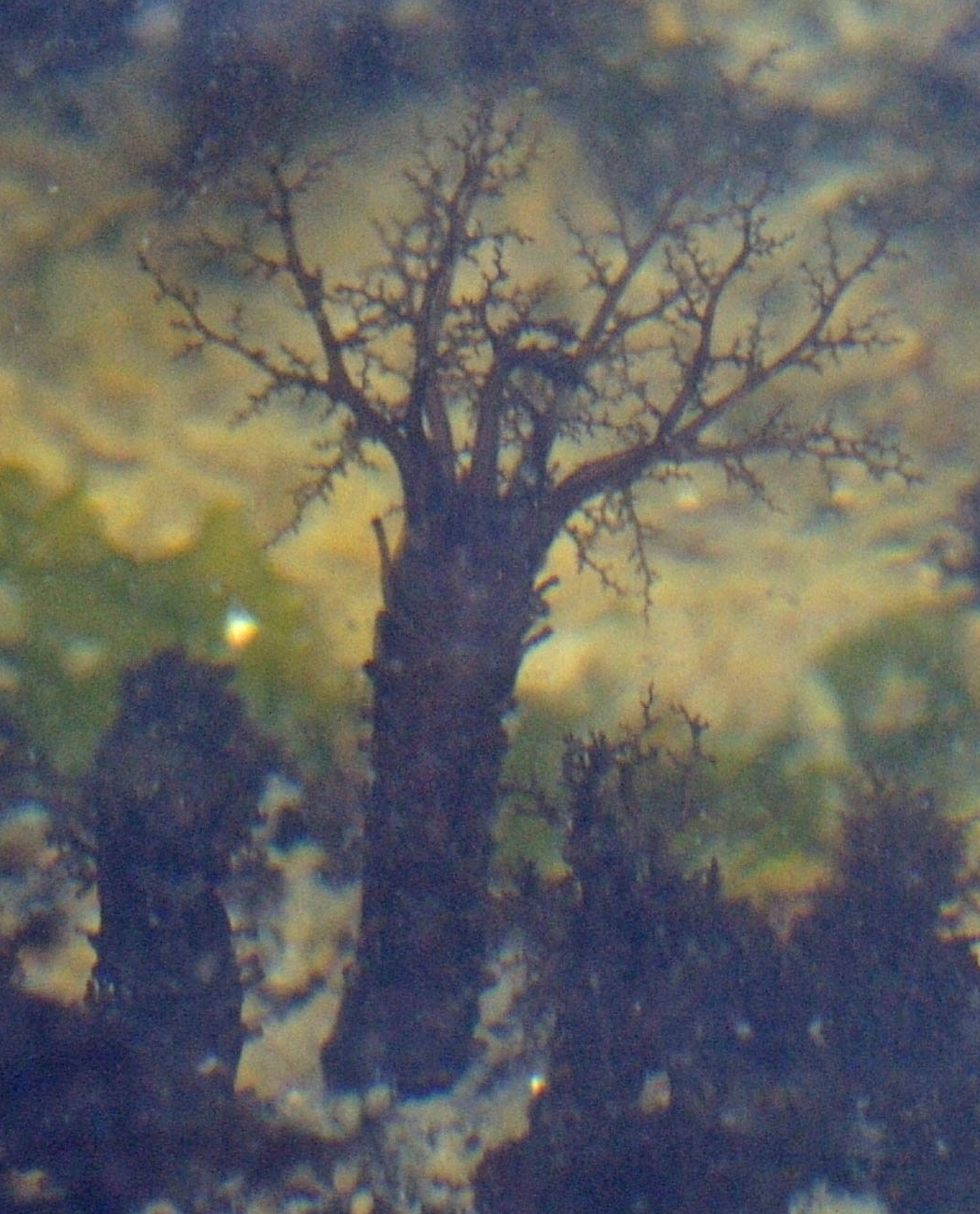
- Cucumaria vegae with feeding tentacles extended

Conservation status
- Secure (NatureServe)

Scientific classification
- Kingdom: Animalia
- Phylum: Echinodermata
- Class: Holothuroidea
- Order: Dendrochirotida
- Family: Cucumariidae
- Genus: Cucumaria
- Species: C. vegae

Binomial name
- Cucumaria vegae Théel, 1886

= Cucumaria vegae =

Species of sea cucumber

Cucumaria vegae, also known as tiny black sea cucumber or northern tar spot, is a species of sea cucumber. It was first described to science by Johan Hjalmar Théel in 1886 reporting on the sea cucumber specimens brought back by the Challenger expedition. Among these was the type specimen for this species, which was collected at Bering Island.

== Description ==
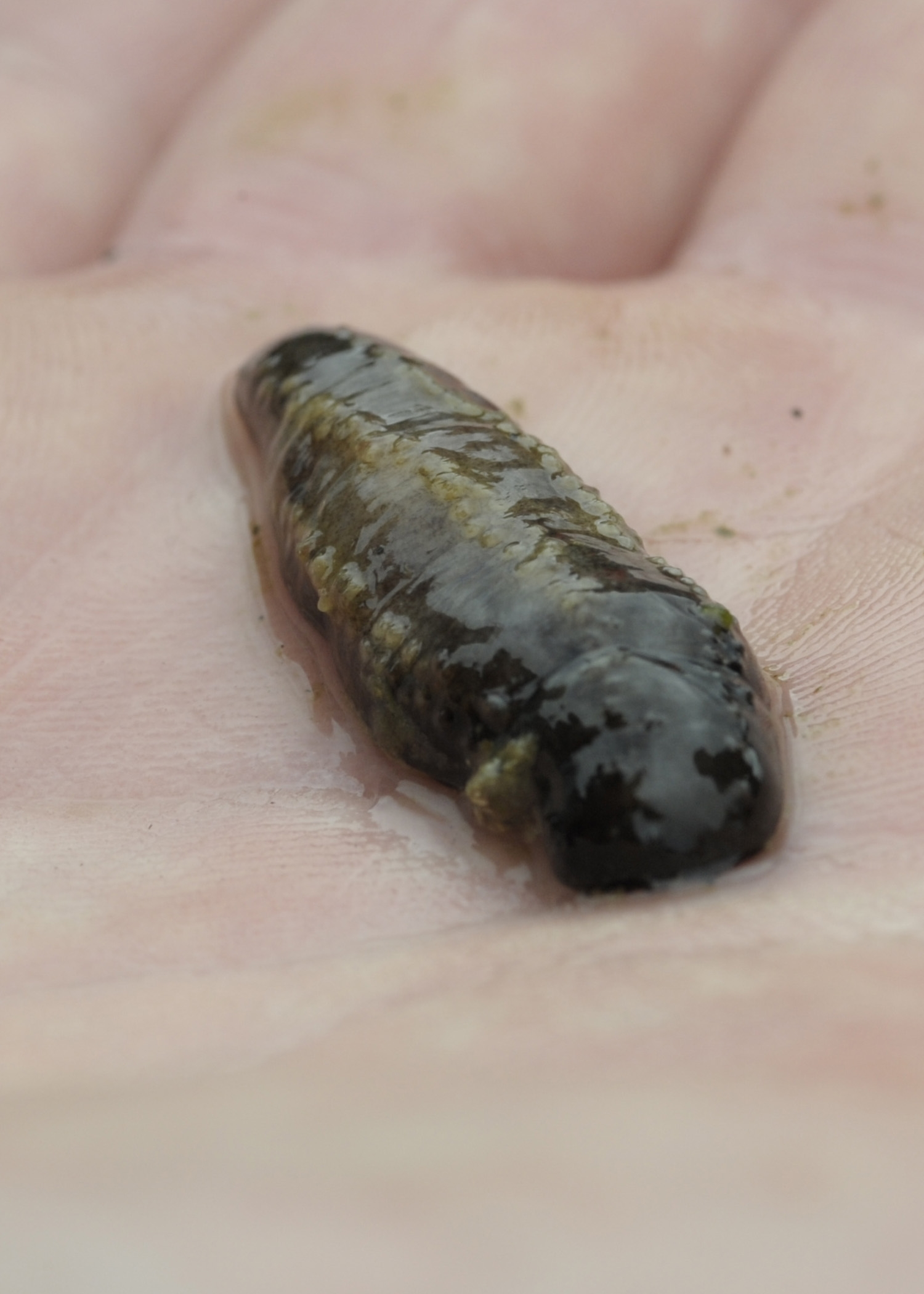
Cucumaria vegae with tentacles retracted. Note the rows of tube feet running the length of the body

As one might expect, the tiny black sea cucumber is small, growing to a length of 38 millimetres (1.5 in). It is black above and a somewhat lighter gray on its underside.

When feeding, the animal extends eight equally long, finely branched, or dendritic, tentacles, and two shorter ones. These shorter tentacles are on the animal's ventral, or bottom side. When disturbed it retracts these delicate structures into its body.

There are five double rows of podia, or tube feet that run the length of the body. Those on the dorsal, upper, side of the sea cucumber are less distinct. Like the tentacles, the tube feet retract when the animal is disturbed.

Although the animal is highly flexible, it has calcareous plates, ossicles, embedded in its skin. When examined under a microscope, these ossicles appear generally rod-shaped with a number of small round holes.

== Distribution ==
Tiny black sea cucumbers are found in the North Pacific Ocean from Hokkaido, Japan to the Russian Far East, the Commander Islands, the Aleutians, and south along the North American coast to Haida Gwaii in British Columbia.

This is a shallow water species living on rocky bottoms in the intertidal zone, often in association with mussel beds.

== Life history ==
This animal uses its tentacles to strain bits of organic matter from the sea. The tentacles have a coating of mucus which causes suspended particles to stick. The sea cucumber periodically retracts its tentacles, consuming the material stuck to them. Its close association with mussel beds, including those of Mytillus californianus, suggests that feces from these bivalves may form an important part of its diet.

Tiny black sea cucumbers are gonochoric, which is to say that individuals are either male or female. Females retain their orange egg masses trapping them between their ventral side and the sea bottom. These are fertilized by nearby males that release their sperm into the sea. The skin of the females in contact with the egg mass is highly vascularized, suggesting that the adult provides nutrients to the developing young. Females brood their young during the late winter.

Tiny black sea cucumbers are parasitized by the Colombian cucumber sucker snail, Vitreolina columbiana. These tiny snails attach themselves to C. vegae and suck the fluids out of them.

While this species is numerous it is so small that there is no commercial fishery.

== Taxonomy ==
Externally, Cucumaria vegae is all but identical to another species of sea cucumber, Cucumaria pseudocurata. This latter species extends from the southernmost range of the tiny black sea cucumber in British Columbia to Southern California. Detailed examination of the bony plates in the skin, the ossicles, suggests a gradual change over the geographic range of the two species, rather than a sharp difference at the boundary between the two. Similarly, comparisons of mitochondrial DNA show only modest differences between the two species. It may be that C. vegae and C. pseuocurata, are in fact the same species.
