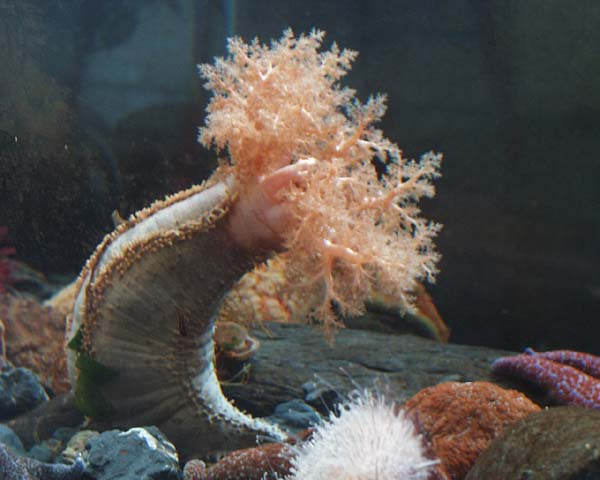
- Cucumaria miniata

Scientific classification
- Kingdom: Animalia
- Phylum: Echinodermata
- Class: Holothuroidea
- Order: Dendrochirotida
- Family: Cucumariidae
- Genus: Cucumaria; Blainville, 1830

Synonyms
- Botryodactyla Ayres, 1851; Pentactes Burmeister, 1837; Semperia Lampert, 1885

= Cucumaria =

Genus of sea cucumbers

Cucumaria is a genus of sea cucumbers.

== Species ==
The following species are recognised in the genus Cucumaria.

- Cucumaria adela Clark, 1946
- Cucumaria anivaensis Levin, 2004
- Cucumaria arcuata (Hérouard, 1921)
- Cucumaria beringiana Stepanov & Panina, 2021
- Cucumaria compressa (R. Perrier, 1898)
- Cucumaria conicospermium Levin & Stepanov, 2002
- Cucumaria crax Deichmann, 1941
- Cucumaria diligens D'yakonov & Baranova in D'yakonov, Baranova & Savel'eva, 1958
- Cucumaria djakonovi Baranova, 1980
- Cucumaria dudexa O'Loughlin & Manjón-Cabeza, 2009
- Cucumaria duriuscula Sluiter, 1901
- Cucumaria fallax Ludwig, 1875
- Cucumaria flamma Solis-Marin & Laguarda-Figueras, 1999
- Cucumaria frondosa (Gunnerus, 1767) – orange-footed sea cucumber
- Cucumaria fusiformis Levin, 2006
- Cucumaria georgiana (Lampert, 1886)
- Cucumaria ijimai Ohshima, 1915
- Cucumaria insperata D'yakonov & Baranova in D'yakonov, Baranova & Savel'eva, 1958
- Cucumaria irregularis Vaney, 1906
- Cucumaria joubini Vaney, 1914
- Cucumaria koreaensis Östergren, 1898
- Cucumaria lamberti Levin & Gudimova, 1998
- Cucumaria lateralis Vaney, 1906
- Cucumaria levini Stepanov & Pil'ganchuk, 2002
- Cucumaria miniata (Brandt, 1835) – orange sea cucumber
- Cucumaria munita Sluiter, 1901
- Cucumaria obscura Levin, 2006
- Cucumaria okhotensis Levin & Stepanov, 2003
- Cucumaria pallida Kirkendale & Lambert, 1995
- Cucumaria paraglacialis Heding, 1942
- Cucumaria parassimilis Deichmann, 1930
- Cucumaria perfida Vaney, 1908
- Cucumaria periprocta Vaney, 1908
- Cucumaria piperata (Stimpson, 1864)
- Cucumaria planciana (Delle Chiaje, 1841)
- Cucumaria pseudocurata Deichmann, 1938
- Cucumaria pusilla Ludwig, 1886
- Cucumaria sachalinica D'yakonov, 1949
- Cucumaria salma Yingst, 1972
- Cucumaria savelijevae Baranova, 1980
- Cucumaria solangeae Martins & Souto, 2015
- Cucumaria tenuis Ludwig, 1875
- Cucumaria vaneyi Cherbonnier, 1949
- Cucumaria vegae Théel, 1886 – tiny black sea cucumber or northern tar spot
- Cucumaria vicaria Sluiter, 1910
- Cucumaria vilis Sluiter, 1901
