= Velkovrhia =

Scientific classification
- Domain: Eukaryota
- Kingdom: Animalia
- Phylum: Cnidaria
- Class: Hydrozoa
- Order: Anthoathecata
- Family: Bougainvilliidae
- Genus: Velkovrhia; Matjasic & Sket, 1971

Genus of aquatic animals

Velkovrhia is a genus of cnidarians belonging to the family Bougainvilliidae.

The species of this genus are found in Europe.

Species:

- Velkovrhia enigmatica Matjasic & Sket, 1971
