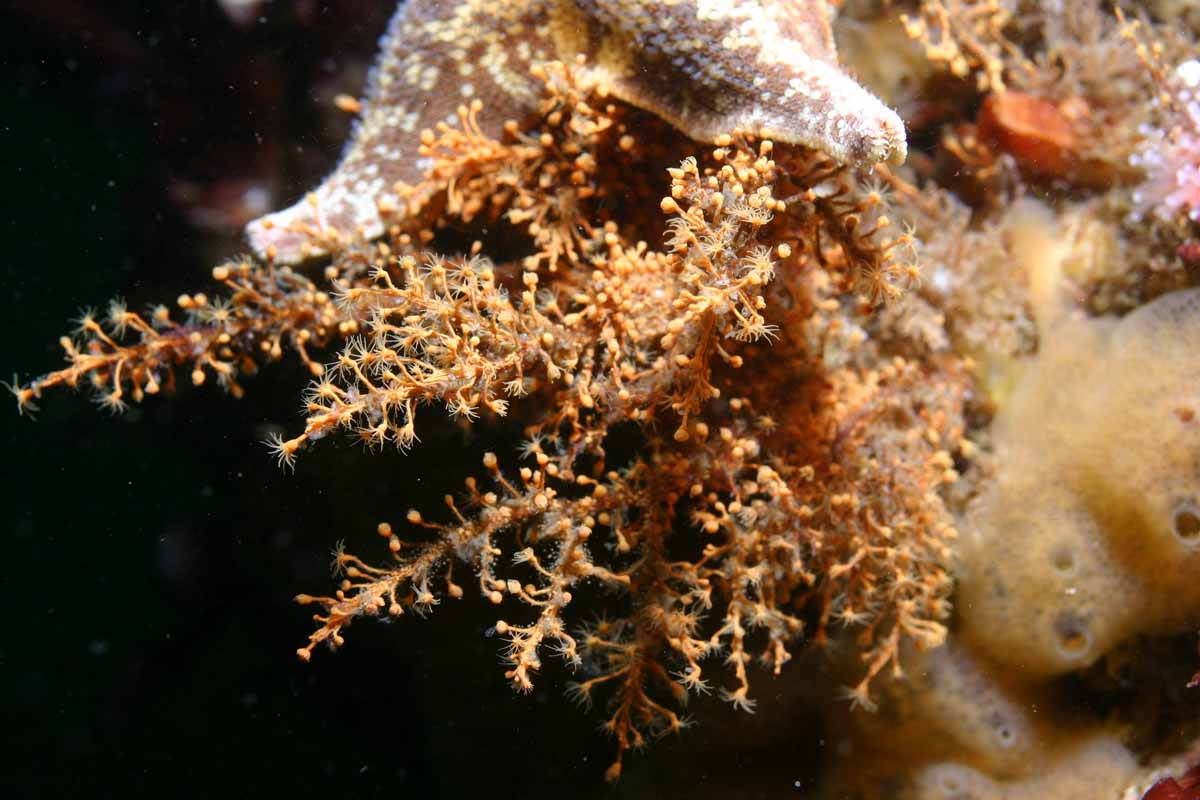
- Garveia annulata

Scientific classification
- Kingdom: Animalia
- Phylum: Cnidaria
- Class: Hydrozoa
- Order: Anthoathecata
- Family: Bougainvilliidae
- Genus: Garveia; Wright, 1859

Type species
- Garveia nutans Wright, 1859

Synonyms
- Calyptospadia Delage & Hérouard, 1901; Corythamnium Allman, 1859; Pruvotella Motz-Kossowska, 1905

= Garveia =

Genus of aquatic animals

Garveia is a genus of cnidarians belonging to the family Bougainvilliidae.

The genus has a cosmopolitan distribution.

== Species ==
The following species are recognised in the genus Garveia:

- Garveia annulata Nutting, 1901 - orange hydroid
- Garveia arborea (Browne, 1907) - hedgehog hydroid or orange hydroid
- Garveia belyaevi Stepanjants & Chernyshev, 2015
- Garveia clevelandensis Pennycuik, 1959
- Garveia crassa (Stechow, 1923)
- Garveia gracilis (Clark, 1876)
- Garveia grisea (Motz-Kossowska, 1905)
- Garveia nutans Wright, 1859
- Garveia polarsterni Stepanjants, 2001
