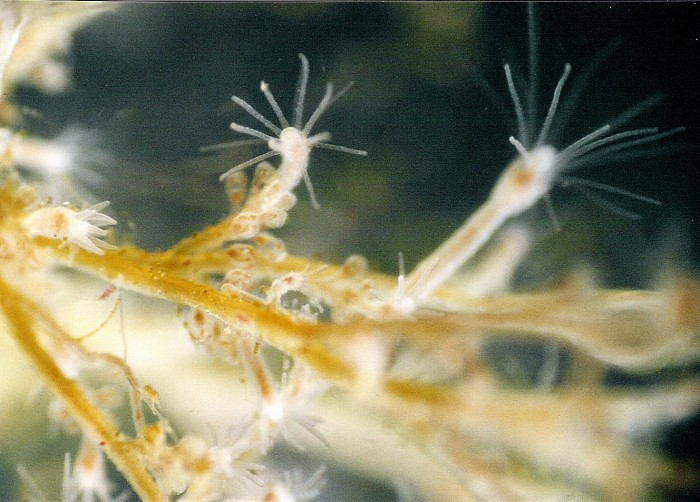
- Bougainvillia muscus

Scientific classification
- Kingdom: Animalia
- Phylum: Cnidaria
- Class: Hydrozoa
- Order: Anthoathecata
- Family: Bougainvilliidae
- Genus: Bougainvillia; Lesson, 1830

Species
- See text

Synonyms
- Atractylis Wright, 1858; Corynopsis Allman, 1864; Hippocrene Brandt, 1835; Margelis Steenstrup, 1850; Perigonimus M. Sars, 1846

= Bougainvillia =

Genus of hydrozoans

Bougainvillia is a genus of hydroids in the family Bougainvilliidae in the class Hydrazoa. Members of the genus are characterised by having the marginal tentacles of their medusae arranged in four bundles. Some species are solitary and others are colonial but all are filter feeders. They are found in the Southern Ocean, having a circumpolar distribution, but some species also occur in the Northern Hemisphere, possibly travelling there as polyps on the hulls of ships.

== Species ==
The World Register of Marine Species lists the following species:

- Bougainvillia aberrans Calder, 1993
- Bougainvillia aurantiaca Bouillon, 1980
- Bougainvillia balei Stechow, 1924
- Bougainvillia bitentaculata Uchida, 1925
- Bougainvillia bougainvillei (Brandt, 1835)
- Bougainvillia britannica (Forbes, 1841)
- Bougainvillia carolinensis (Mccrady, 1859)
- Bougainvillia chenyapingii Xu, Huang & Guo, 2007
- Bougainvillia crassa Fraser, 1938
- Bougainvillia dimorpha Schuchert, 1996
- Bougainvillia frondosa Mayer, 1900
- Bougainvillia fulva Agassiz & Mayer, 1899
- Bougainvillia inaequalis Fraser, 1944
- Bougainvillia involuta Uchida, 1947
- Bougainvillia lamellata Xu, Huang & Liu, 2007
- Bougainvillia longicirra Stechow, 1914
- Bougainvillia longistyla Xu & Huang, 2004
- Bougainvillia macloviana Lesson, 1836
- Bougainvillia meinertiae Jäderholm, 1923
- Bougainvillia multitentaculata Förster, 1923
- Bougainvillia muscoides (Sars, 1846)
- Bougainvillia muscus (Allman, 1863)
- Bougainvillia niobe Mayer, 1894
- Bougainvillia paraplatygaster Xu, Huang & Chen, 1991
- Bougainvillia platygaster (Haeckel, 1879)
- Bougainvillia principis (Steenstrup, 1850)
- Bougainvillia pyramidata (Forbes & Goodsir, 1853)
- Bougainvillia reticulata Xu & Huang, 2006
- Bougainvillia rugosa Clarke, 1882
- Bougainvillia superciliaris (L. Agassiz, 1849)
- Bougainvillia vervoorti Bouillon, 1995
