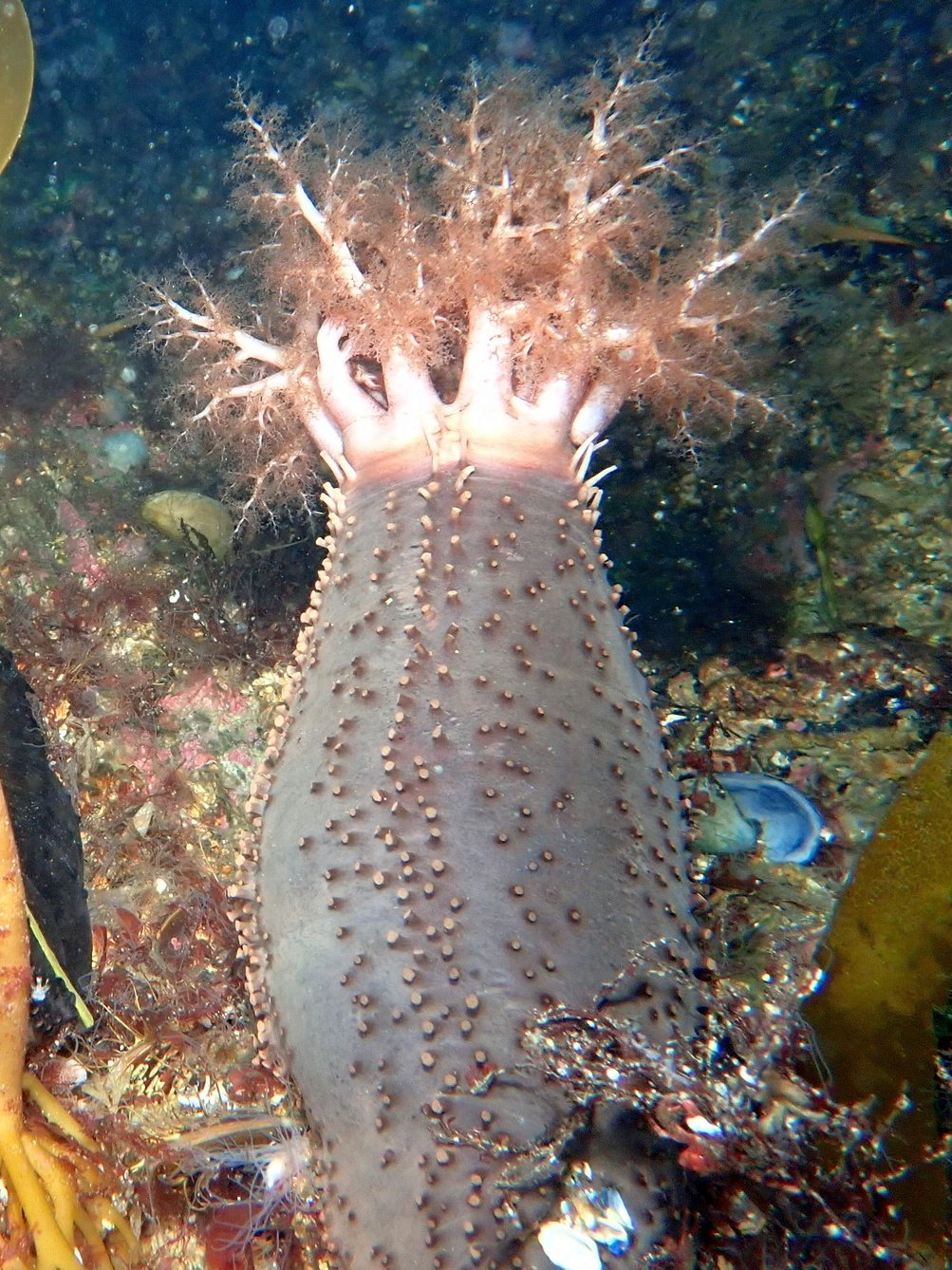

Conservation status
- Least Concern (IUCN 3.1)

- Secure (NatureServe)

Scientific classification
- Kingdom: Animalia
- Phylum: Echinodermata
- Class: Holothuroidea
- Order: Dendrochirotida
- Family: Cucumariidae
- Genus: Cucumaria
- Species: C. frondosa

Binomial name
- Cucumaria frondosa (Gunnerus, 1767)

Synonyms
- List: Botryodactyla affinis Ayres, 1851; Botryodactyla grandis Ayres, 1851; Cucumaria assimilis Düben & Koren, 1846; Holothuria frondosa Gunnerus, 1767; Holothuria fucicola Forbes & Goodsir, 1839; Holothuria grandis Forbes & Goodsir, 1839; Holothuria pentacta Gmelin, 1791; Holothuria pentactes Linnaeus, 1767; Holothuria pentactes O.F. Müller, 1776; Hydra corallifera Gaertner, 1762; Pentacta frondosa (Gunnerus, 1767)

= Orange-footed sea cucumber =

Species of sea cucumber

The orange-footed sea cucumber (Cucumaria frondosa) is a species of sea cucumber. It is one of the most abundant and widespread species of holothurians within the North Atlantic Ocean and the Barents Sea (Russia), being most abundant along the eastern coast of North America.

== Description ==
These sea cucumbers reach around 20 cm (8 in) in length and have ten branched oral tentacles ranging in colour from orange to black. This species has a football shape with a leathery skin ranging in colour from yellowish white to dark brownish-black and is covered with five rows of retractile tube feet. The young are about 1 mm to 6 mm long and are translucent orange and pink. Three of these bands of tube feet are found on bottom whereas the top rows are often reduced. Adults of C. frondosa have a reduced numbers of spicules (skeletal structures) shaped like rounded plates with many holes. The sexes can be identified by the conspicuous tube-shaped (female) or heart-shaped (male) gonopore located under the crown of oral tentacles.

== Habitat ==
Their habitat is rocks, crevices or low-tide Arctic water. They are known to cover vast areas of the substrate at depths of less than 30 meters (100 ft).

== Feeding ==
The sea cucumber has modified its oral tube feet to form tentacles surrounding its mouth which are retracted when disturbed or bringing food into its mouth. The tentacles are displayed in a ring form with ten individual tentacles that are each highly branched looking treelike. Most sea cucumbers are deposit feeders but Cucumaria frondosa are a suspension feeding organism where they catch available particles in the ocean on their tentacles.

Sea cucumbers were tested in the Atlantic Ocean to see if there was seasonality to the feeding of cucumbers. Specifically C. frondosa were shown to have this feeding adaptation, and feed only in the spring (March to April) when the day length, water temperature, and chlorophyll concentration began to increase. A combination of these environmental cues is accountable for the feeding of C. frondosa because just one of them is not enough to trigger the animal to start eating. The chlorophyll concentration increases during this time due to a phytoplankton bloom season and larger amount of primary production. The cucumber does not eat through the colder seasons and will start back up again in the spring.

== Cucumaria frondosa japonica ==
The subspecies Cucumaria frondosa japonica (also given under the now unaccepted Latin name Cucumaria japonica) occurs in Japan, Canada, and elsewhere. The vernacular names in English for this subspecies are; Japanese cucumaria, gray subtidal sea cucumber, giant black sea cucumber and black sea cucumber.

These are generally gray or black in color, though they can be of dark brown, dark purple, or yellowish white color. Its mouth area and contracted tentacles can be flecked with red and white and be colorful, but the outspread tentacles are bushy and black.

The subspecies is known as kinko or fujiko in Japan. The boiled and dried product is also known as kinko (光参) Although formerly considered too flimsy and thus used for fertilizer, a successful method for processing a dried product was developed in 1925, and the dried kinko was once often used in Chinese cuisine, and even exported as a premium commodity to Shanghai, China. The island of Kinkasan in Miyagi Prefecture was known for its production.

The name kinko (where kin means "gold") allegedly comes from its golden yellow reproductive glands, which gave rise to the lore that eating it was like eating gold dust, or that it was a sea cucumber reborn from a spirit of gold.

This cucumber is also consumed regionally in Japan, e.g., with vinegar (as sunomono).
