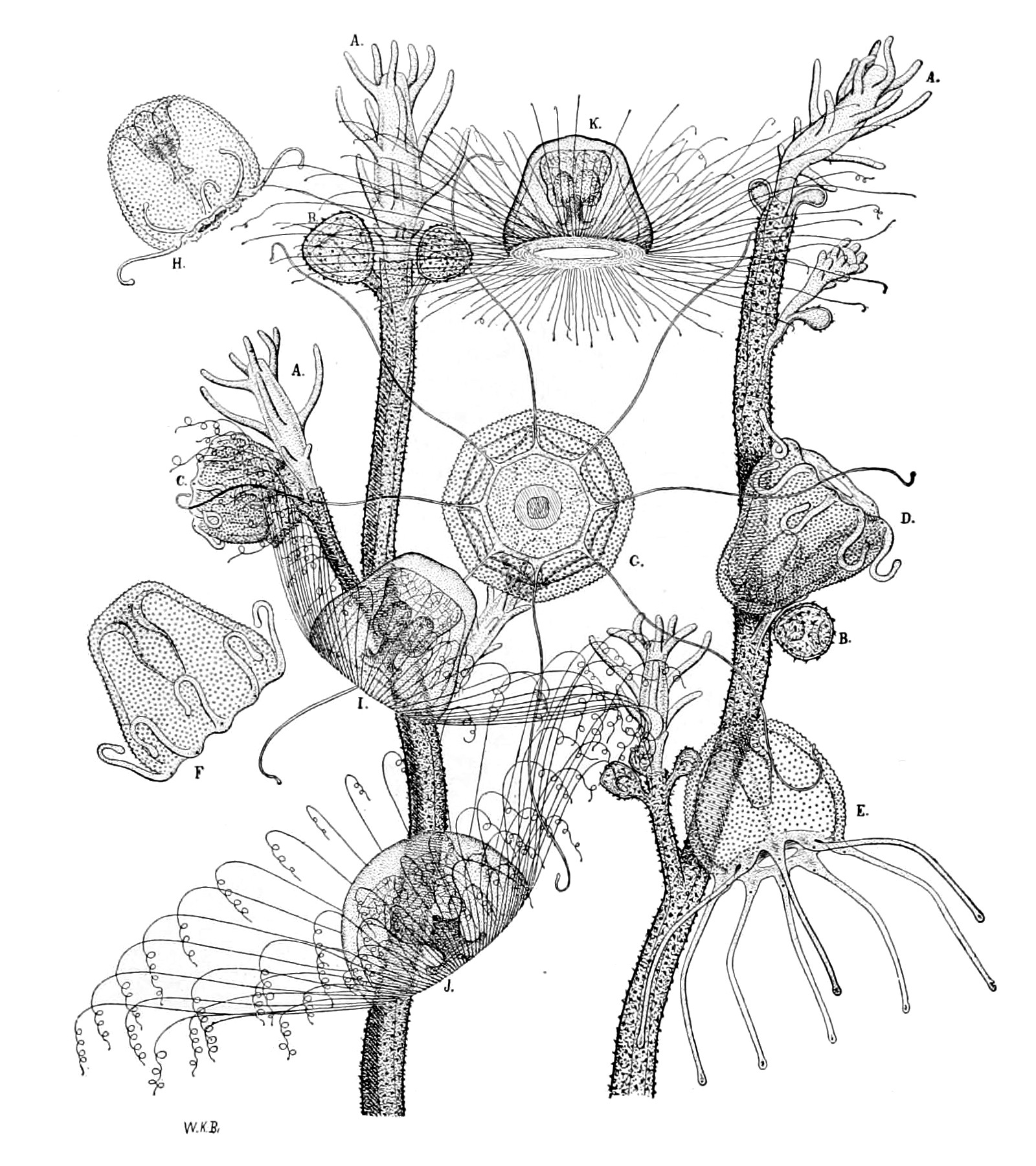

Scientific classification
- Kingdom: Animalia
- Phylum: Cnidaria
- Class: Hydrozoa
- Order: Anthoathecata
- Family: Oceaniidae
- Genus: Turritopsis
- Species: T. nutricula

Binomial name
- Turritopsis nutricula McCrady, 1857

= Turritopsis nutricula =

Species of hydrozoan

Turritopsis nutricula is a small hydrozoan that after reaching adulthood can revert back to a juvenile stage. This adaptive trait likely evolved in order to extend the life of the individual. Several different species of the genus Turritopsis were formerly classified as T. nutricula, including the "immortal jellyfish" which is now classified as T. dohrnii.

== Life cycle ==
Hydrozoans have two distinct stages in their life, a polyp stage and a medusa stage. The polyp stage is benthic, with the cells forming colonies, while the medusa stage is a singular, planktonic organism. Generally in hydrozoa the medusa develops from the asexual budding of the polyp and the polyp results from sexual reproduction of medusae. In some species, planktonic medusae have the ability to bud new medusae, or bud polyps which in turn have the ability to bud new medusae.

=== Reversing the life cycle ===
Turritopsis nutricula in any point of the medusa stage has the ability to transform back into its polyp stage. T. nutricula is the first known metazoan that has been observed to sexually mature and return to its juvenile colonial stage. The medusa does not differ from the polyp just by anatomical organization, but also by a completely different set of somatic cells in its umbrella. This regression from medusa to polyp has only been observed in the presence of differentiated cells from the outer umbrella and part of the animal's digestive system. The ability of transdifferentiation, in which a non-stem cell can morph into a different type of cell, allows this process to occur. It is unknown whether or not stem cells play a role. Due to this regular transformation by T. nutricula, it is thought to have an indefinite lifespan.

There are four stages that were found to describe the inverted life cycle of the Turritopsis nutricula: healthy medusa (where the T.nutricula would swim actively), unhealthy medusa (the T. nutricula was not able to swim), four-leaf clover, and cyst (which would produce the polyp morphologically).
