= Tritonia frondosa =

Scientific classification
- Kingdom: Animalia
- Phylum: Mollusca
- Class: Gastropoda
- Order: Nudibranchia
- Suborder: Tritoniacea
- Family: Tritoniidae
- Genus: Tritonia
- Species: T. frondosa

Binomial name
- Tritonia frondosa (Ascanius, 1774)

Species of gastropod

Tritonia frondosa is a species of dendronotid nudibranch. It is a marine gastropod mollusc in the family Tritoniidae.
