= Pachycordyle =

Scientific classification
- Domain: Eukaryota
- Kingdom: Animalia
- Phylum: Cnidaria
- Class: Hydrozoa
- Order: Anthoathecata
- Family: Bougainvilliidae
- Genus: Pachycordyle; Weismann, 1883

Genus of aquatic animals

Pachycordyle is a genus of cnidarians belonging to the family Bougainvilliidae.

The species of this genus are found in Europe, Southeastern Asia and Northern America.

Species:

- Pachycordyle conica Kramp, 1959
- Pachycordyle degenerata (Mayer, 1904)
- Pachycordyle globulosa Kramp, 1959
- Pachycordyle kubotai Stepanjants, Timoshkin, Anokhin & Napara, 2000
- Pachycordyle lineata Kramp, 1959
- Pachycordyle mashikoi (Itô, 1952)
- Pachycordyle michaeli (Berrill, 1948)
- Pachycordyle napolitana Weismann, 1883
- Pachycordyle pusilla (Motz-Kossowska, 1905)
