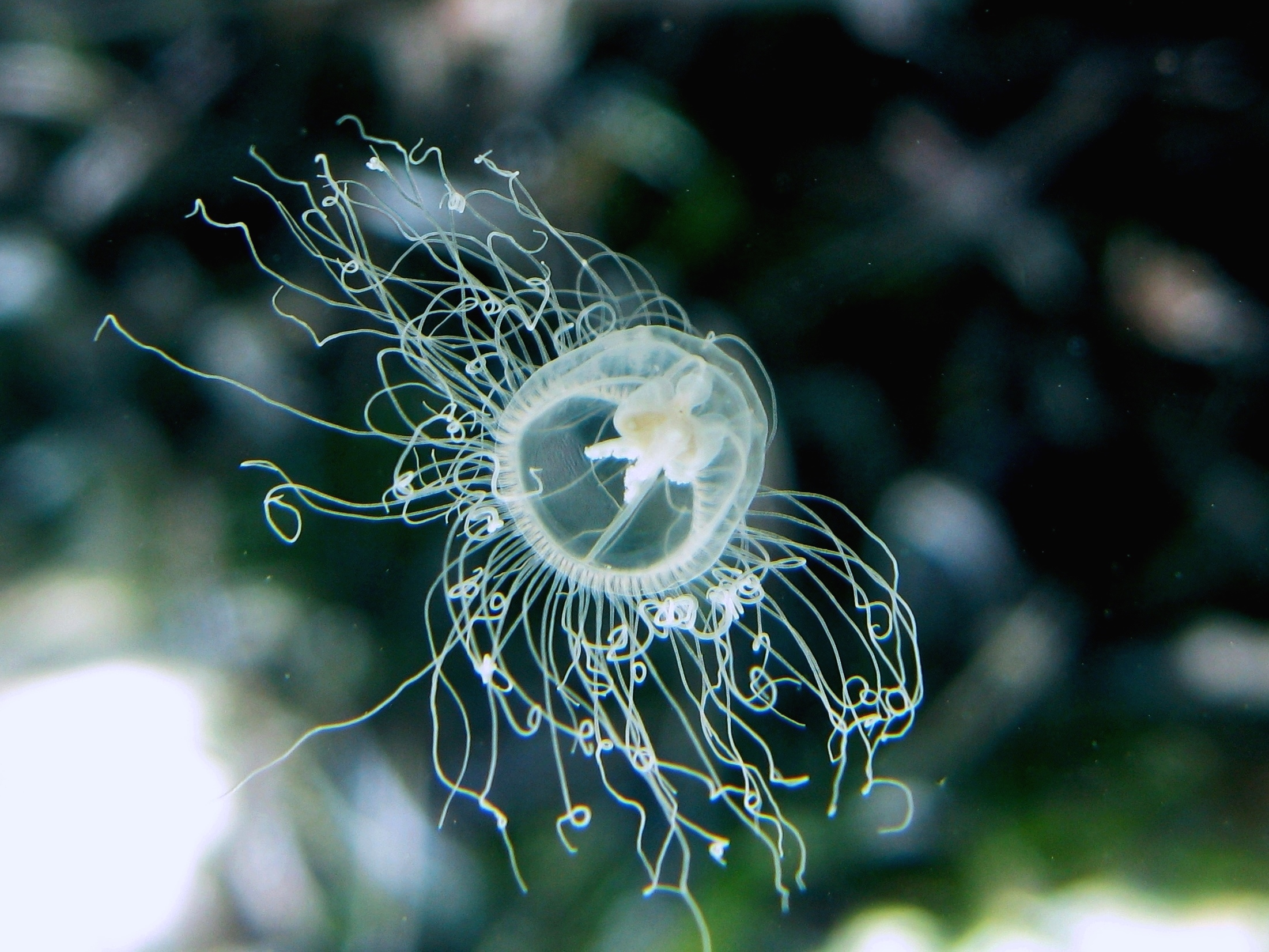
- Oceania armata

Scientific classification
- Kingdom: Animalia
- Phylum: Cnidaria
- Class: Hydrozoa
- Order: Anthoathecata
- Suborder: Filifera
- Family: Oceaniidae; Eschscholtz, 1829

Diversity
- 9 or 10 genera, 40+ species

= Oceaniidae =

Family of hydrozoans

Oceaniidae is one of the over 50 cnidarian families of the order Anthomedusae. It contains nearly 50 species in ten genera.

== Genera ==
- Corydendrium (11 species)
- Corystolona (monotypic)
- Merona (5 species)
- Oceania (6 species)
- Pachycordyle (disputed)
- Rhizogeton (7 species)
- Similomerona (monotypic)
- Tubiclava (5 species)
- Turritopsis (11 species)
- Turritopsoides (monotypic)
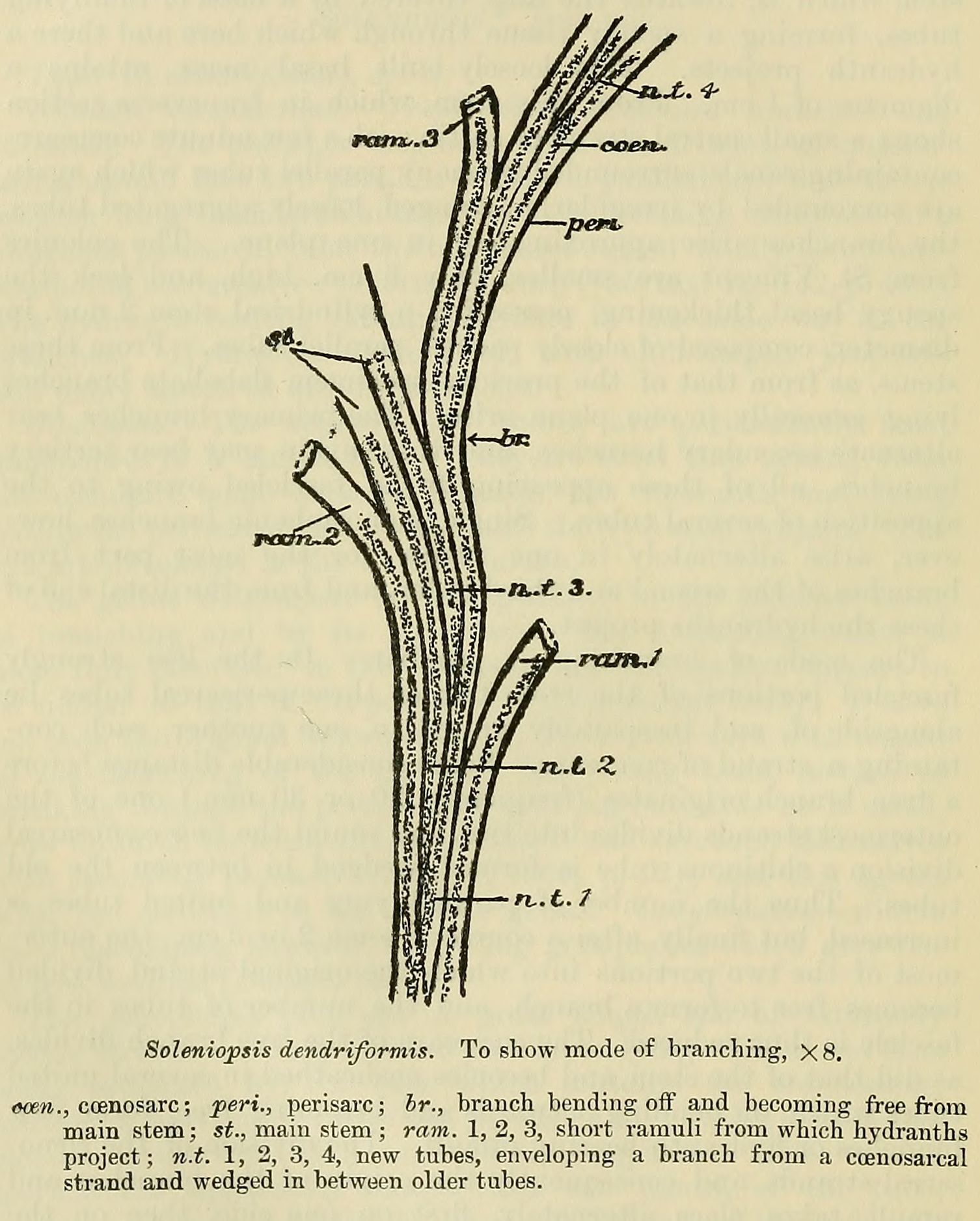
Corydendrium parasiticum, Stalk section of colony showing branching pattern, magnification × 8. br. = branch, coen. = coenosarc, n.t.1/2/3/4 = new tubes enveloping a branch from a coenosarcal strand and wedged in between older tubes, peri. = perisarc, ram.1/2/3 = short bearing hydranths, st. = stem.

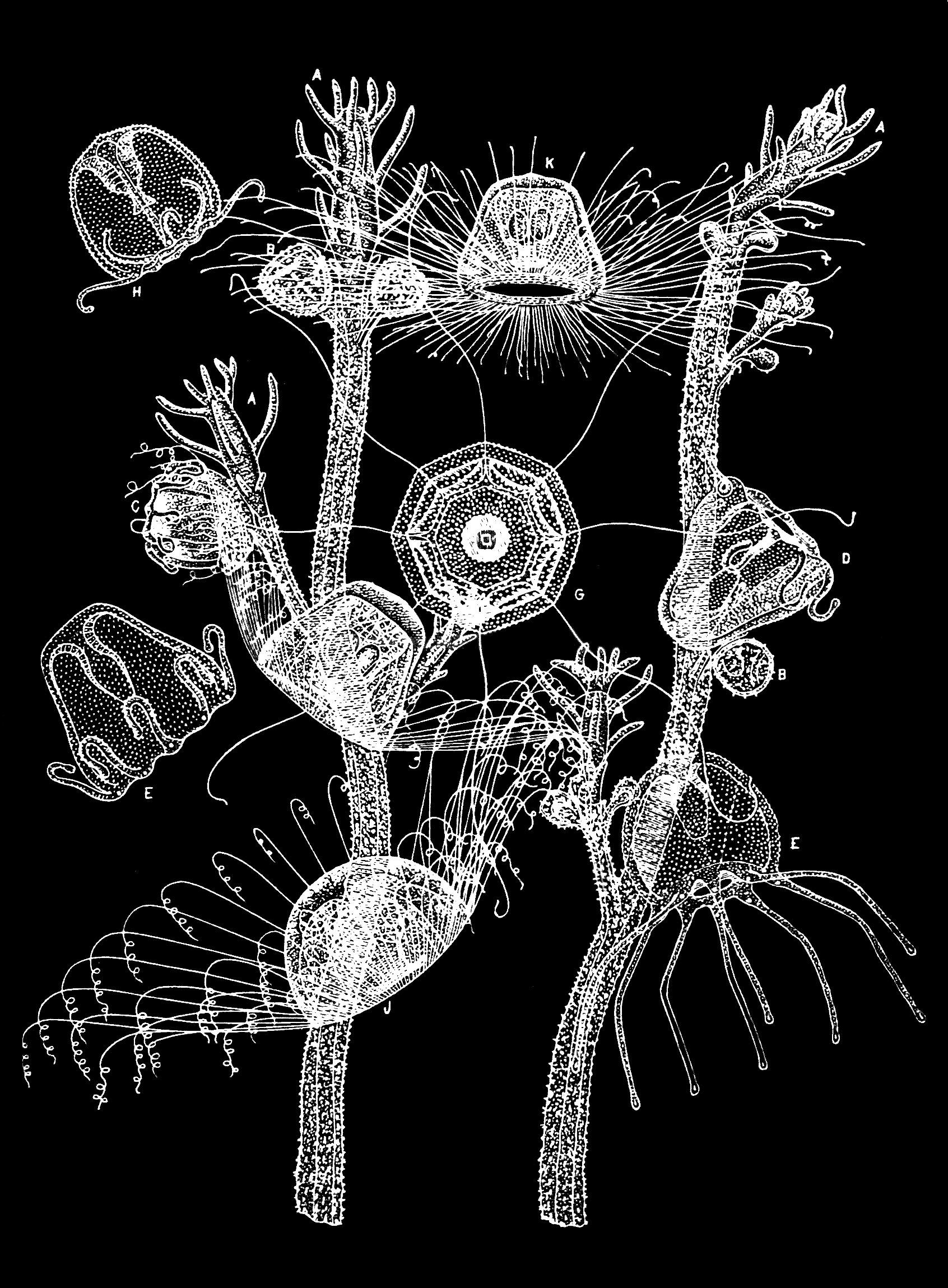
Turritopsis life cycle. Two branches from the tree-like colony are shown, with a feeding hydra (A) the tip of each twig. Buds at the base of the hydra (at B) eventually detach and grow into adult jellyfish (K)
