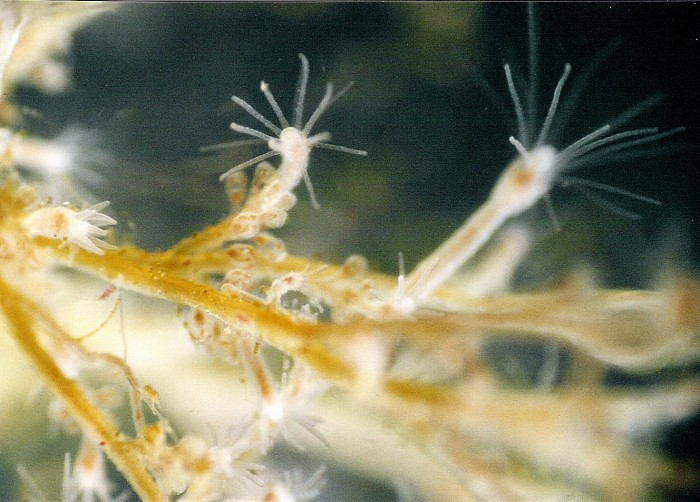
- Bougainvillia muscus

Scientific classification
- Kingdom: Animalia
- Phylum: Cnidaria
- Class: Hydrozoa
- Order: Anthoathecata
- Suborder: Filifera
- Family: Bougainvilliidae; Lütken, 1850

Genera
- See text

Synonyms
- Atractylidae Hincks, 1868; Bimeridae Allman, 1872; Clavopsellidae Thiel, 1962; Dicorynidae Allman, 1864; Hippocrenidae McCrady, 1959; Lizusidae Haeckel, 1879; Margelidae Haeckel, 1879; Nemopsidae L. Agassiz, 1862; Pachycordylini Cockerell, 1911; Thamnostomidae Haeckel, 1879

= Bougainvilliidae =

Family of cnidarians

Bougainvilliidae is a family of marine hydroids in the class Hydrozoa. Members of the family are found worldwide. There are sixteen accepted genera and about ninety-three species.

== Description ==
Hydroids in this family can be solitary or colonial. When colonial, the hydranths or hydroid polyps are either linked by stolons or are branched. The hydranths have one or more whorls of fine tentacles. The gonophores are free-living medusae or are fixed sporosacs. The medusae are bell-shaped with a circular mouth and branched oral tentacles inserted above the rim of the mouth, ending in clusters of nematocysts.

== Genera ==
- Bimeria Wright, 1859
- Bougainvillia Lesson, 1830
- Chiarella Maas, 1897
- Dicoryne Allman, 1859
- Garveia Wright, 1859
- Koellikerina Kramp, 1939
- Millardiana Wedler & Larson, 1986 (tentatively placed here)
- Nemopsis Agassiz, 1849
- Nubiella Bouillon, 1980
- Pachycordyle Weismann, 1883
- Parawrightia Warren, 1907
- Rhizorhagium M. Sars, 1874
- Silhouetta Millard & Bouillon, 1973
- Thamnostoma Haeckel, 1879
- Velkovrhia Matjasic & Sket, 1971
