= Jet propulsion =

Thrust produced by ejecting a jet of fluid

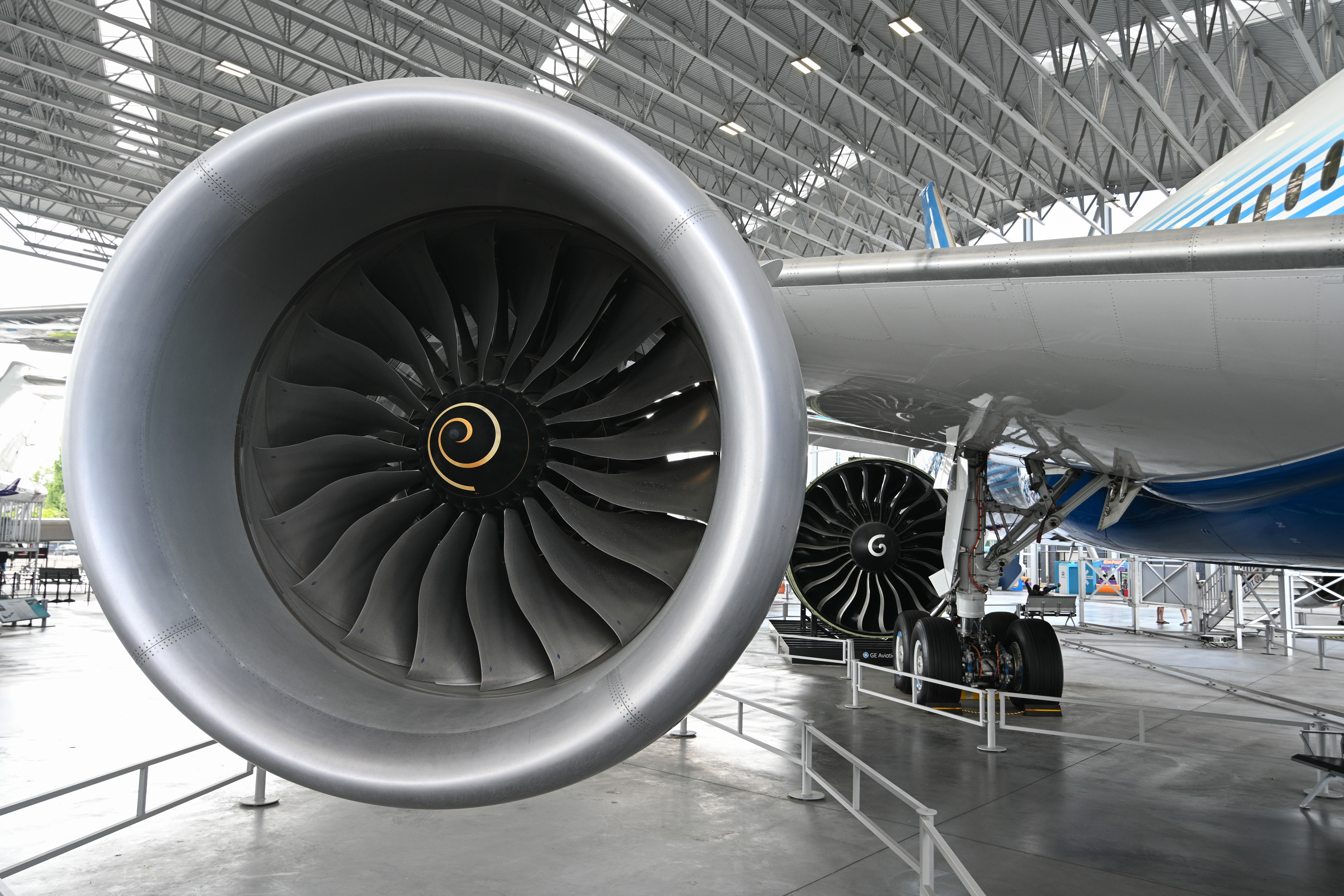
The jet engine of a Boeing 787 Dreamliner.

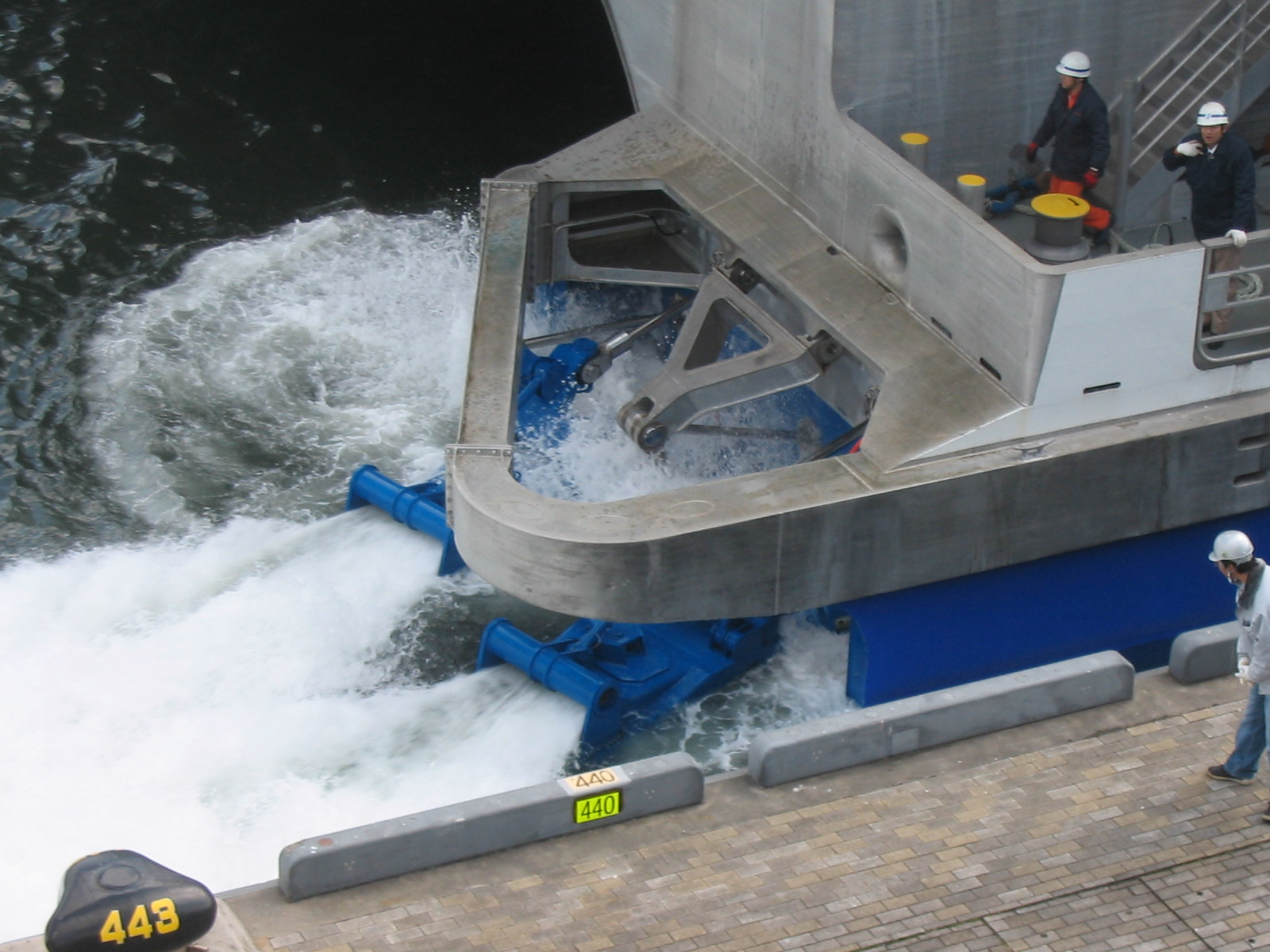
A pump-jet on a ferry.

Jet propulsion is the propulsion of an object in one direction, produced by ejecting a jet of fluid in the opposite direction. By Newton's third law, the moving body is propelled in the opposite direction to the jet. Reaction engines operating on the principle of jet propulsion include the jet engine used for aircraft propulsion, the pump-jet used for marine propulsion, and the rocket engine and plasma thruster used for spacecraft propulsion. Underwater jet propulsion is also used by several marine animals, including cephalopods and salps, with the flying squid even displaying the only known instance of jet-powered aerial flight in the animal kingdom.

== Physics ==
Jet propulsion is produced by some reaction engines or animals when thrust is generated by a fast moving jet of fluid in accordance with Newton's laws of motion. It is most effective when the Reynolds number is high—that is, the object being propelled is relatively large and passing through a low-viscosity medium.

In animals, the most efficient jets are pulsed, rather than continuous, at least when the Reynolds number is greater than 6.

=== Specific impulse ===
Specific impulse (usually abbreviated I_{sp}) is a measure of how effectively a rocket uses propellant or jet engine uses fuel. By definition, it is the total impulse (or change in momentum) delivered per unit of propellant consumed and is dimensionally equivalent to the generated thrust divided by the propellant mass flow rate or weight flow rate. If mass (kilogram, pound-mass, or slug) is used as the unit of propellant, then specific impulse has units of velocity. If weight (newton or pound-force) is used instead, then specific impulse has units of time (seconds). Multiplying flow rate by the standard gravity (g_{0}) converts specific impulse from the mass basis to the weight basis.

A propulsion system with a higher specific impulse uses the mass of the propellant more effectively in creating forward thrust and, in the case of a rocket, less propellant needed for a given delta-v, per the Tsiolkovsky rocket equation. In rockets, this means the engine is more effective at gaining altitude, distance, and velocity. This effectiveness is less important in jet engines that employ wings and use outside air for combustion and carry payloads that are much heavier than the propellant.

Specific impulse includes the contribution to impulse provided by external air that has been used for combustion and is exhausted with the spent propellant. Jet engines use outside air, and therefore have a much higher specific impulse than rocket engines. The specific impulse in terms of propellant mass spent has units of distance per time, which is an artificial velocity called the "effective exhaust velocity". This is higher than the actual exhaust velocity because the mass of the combustion air is not being accounted for. Actual and effective exhaust velocity are the same in rocket engines not utilizing air.

Specific impulse is inversely proportional to specific fuel consumption (SFC) by the relationship I_{sp} = 1/(g_{o}·SFC) for SFC in kg/(N·s) and I_{sp} = 3600/SFC for SFC in lb/(lbf·hr).

=== Thrust ===
From the definition of specific impulse thrust in SI units is:

$$F = \dot m V_e$$

where V_{e} is the effective exhaust velocity and $\dot m$ is the propellant flow rate.

== Types of reaction engine ==
Reaction engines produce thrust by expelling solid or fluid reaction mass; jet propulsion applies only to engines which use fluid reaction mass.

=== Jet engine ===
A jet engine is a reaction engine which uses ambient air as the working fluid and converts it to a hot, high-pressure gas which is expanded through one or more nozzles. Technically, most jet engines are gas turbines, working on the Brayton Cycle. Two types of jet engines, the turbojet and turbofan, employ axial-flow or centrifugal compressors to raise the pressure before combustion and turbines to drive the compression. Ramjets operate only at high flight speeds because they omit the compressors and turbines, depending instead on the dynamic pressure generated by the high speed (known as ram compression). Pulse jets also omit the compressors and turbines but can generate static thrust and have limited maximum speed.

=== Rocket engine ===
The rocket is capable of operating in the vacuum of space because it is dependent on the vehicle carrying its own oxidizer instead of using the oxygen in the air, or in the case of a nuclear rocket, heats an inert propellant (such as liquid hydrogen) by forcing it through a nuclear reactor.

=== Plasma engine ===
Plasma thrusters accelerate a plasma by electromagnetic means.

=== Pump-jet ===
The pump-jet, used for marine propulsion, uses water as the working fluid, pressurized by a ducted propeller, centrifugal pump, or a combination of the two.

== Jet-propelled animals ==
Cephalopods such as squid use jet propulsion for rapid escape from predators; they use other mechanisms for slow swimming. The jet is produced by ejecting water through a siphon, which typically narrows to a small opening to produce the maximum exhalent velocity. The water passes through the gills prior to exhalation, fulfilling the dual purpose of respiration and locomotion.

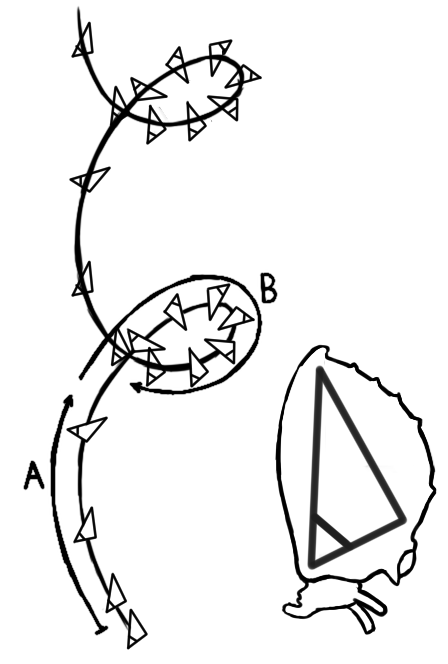
Swimming motion in the sea slug Notarchus punctatus

Sea hares (Gastropoda, Opisthobranchia) employ a similar method, but without the sophisticated neurological machinery of cephalopods and the absence of fins to steer their movements, they navigate somewhat more clumsily.

The swimming cycle has two phases: (A) the propulsive phase, where the animal ejects a jet of water to move, and (B) the rolling phase, where it performs a somersault to reset its position.

A study by Mazzarelli (1893) suggests that Dromia crabs may be predators of Notarchus. In a confined tank with little sea water, two sea hares suffocated after being tightly held by the crab for hours, despite showing no visible injuries upon dissection. It is unclear if this behavior occurs in the wild, but Notarchus may escape simply by swimming if space allows.

Some teleost fish have developed jet propulsion, passing water through the gills to supplement fin-driven motion.

In some dragonfly larvae, jet propulsion is achieved by the expulsion of water from a specialised cavity through the anus. Given the small size of the organism, a great speed is achieved.

Scallops and cardiids, siphonophores, tunicates (such as salps), and some jellyfish also employ jet propulsion. The most efficient jet-propelled organisms are the salps, which use an order of magnitude less energy (per kilogram per metre) than squid.

== See also ==
- Jet aircraft
