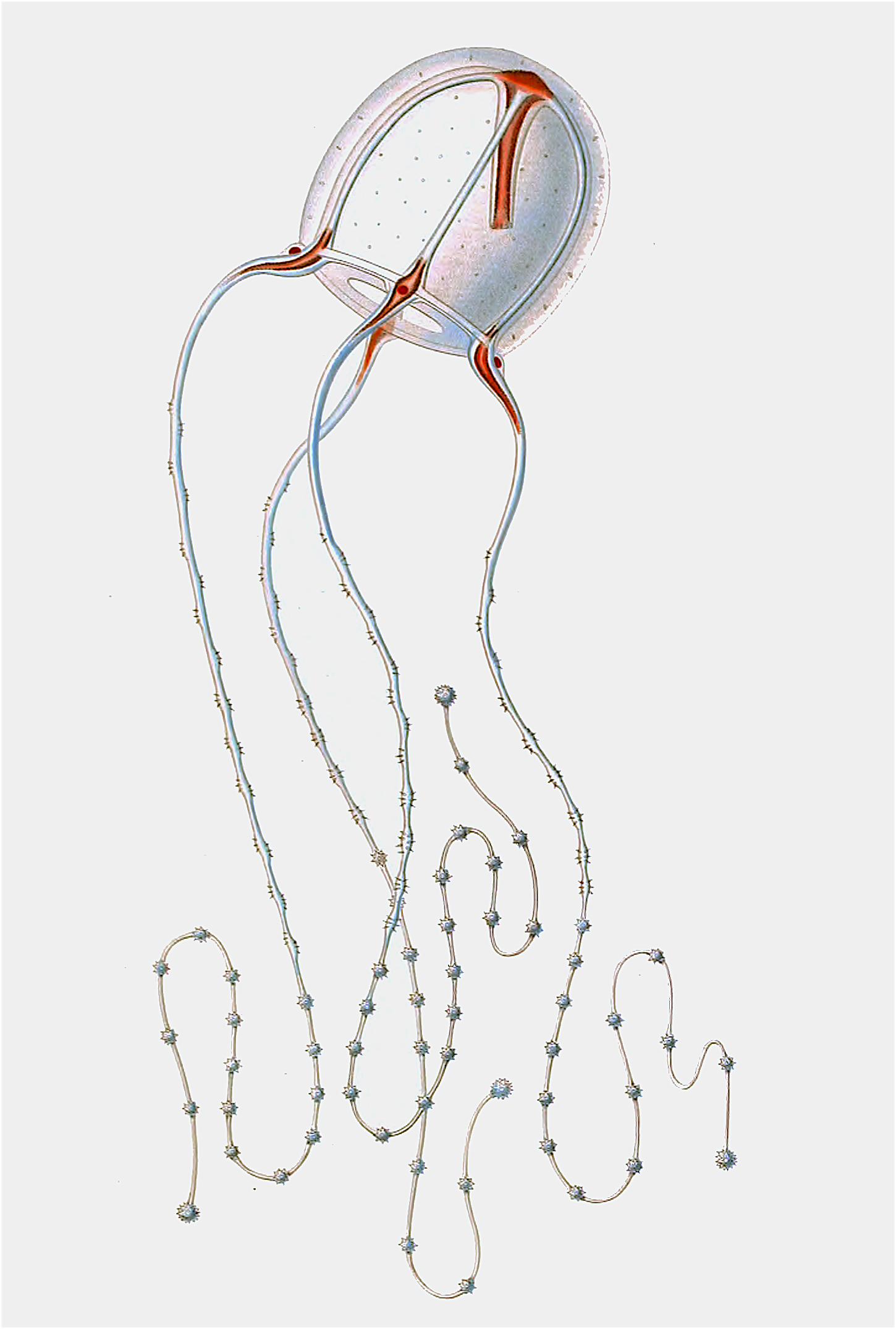
- Young planoblast of Coryne eximia

Scientific classification
- Domain: Eukaryota
- Kingdom: Animalia
- Phylum: Cnidaria
- Class: Hydrozoa
- Order: Anthoathecata
- Family: Corynidae
- Genus: Coryne
- Species: C. eximia

Binomial name
- Coryne eximia Allman, 1859

Synonyms
- Sarsia eximia (Allman, 1859)

= Coryne eximia =

Species of hydrozoan

Coryne eximia is a species of athecate hydroid belonging to the family Corynidae.

== Distribution ==
This seems to be an almost ubiquitous species, having been recorded in coastal locations worldwide.

== Description ==
Coryne eximia is a red or pink hydroid growing to 15 cm tall but usually only half this size. It is rather similar to Coryne muscoides but differs in that all the branches usually come off one side of each stem and that most of the stems and branches are smooth with only small, irregular ringed sections. As with C. muscoides, each branch ends with a polyp which has a cluster of knobbed tentacles.

== Habitat ==
Coryne eximia can be found in a wide range of rocky shore habitats but is also abundant on kelp stipes and can also often be found on the ropes and floats of lobster pots and Marinas.
