= Kofoidinium velleloides =

Scientific classification
- Domain: Eukaryota
- Clade: Diaphoretickes
- Clade: SAR
- Clade: Alveolata
- Phylum: Myzozoa
- Superclass: Dinoflagellata
- Class: Noctilucophyceae
- Order: Noctilucales
- Family: Kofoidiniaceae
- Genus: Kofoidinium
- Species: K. velleloides

Binomial name
- Kofoidinium velleloides Pavillard

Species of alga

Kofoidinium velleloides is a species of dinoflagellate belonging to the family Kofoidiniaceae.

The species inhabits marine environments.
