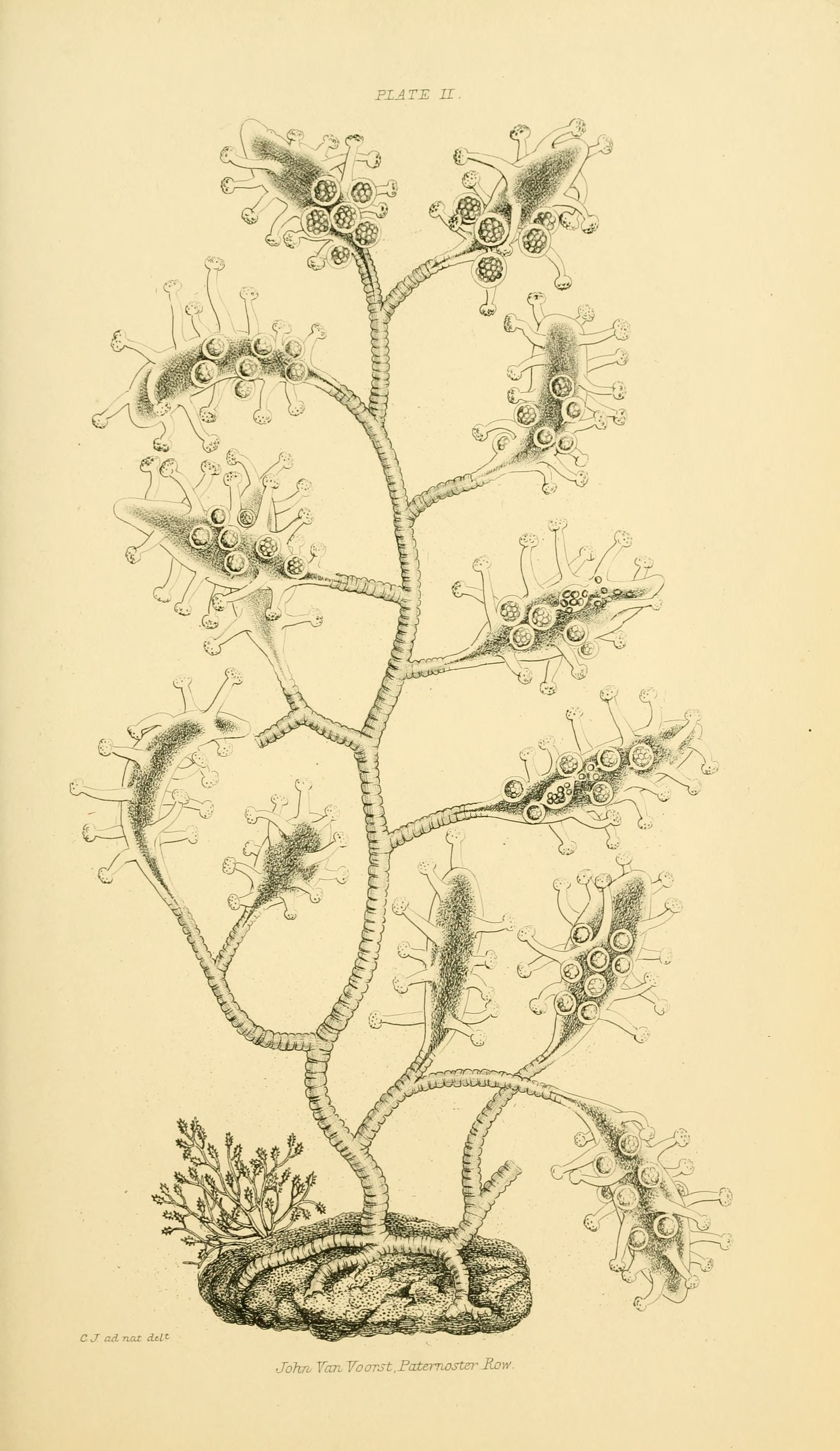
- Coryne pusilla, by Catharine Johnston

Scientific classification
- Kingdom: Animalia
- Phylum: Cnidaria
- Class: Hydrozoa
- Order: Anthoathecata
- Family: Corynidae
- Genus: Coryne; Gaertner, 1774

Species
- See text

= Coryne =

Genus of hydrozoans

Coryne is a genus of hydrozoans belonging to the family Corynidae.

== Derivation of genus name ==
κορυνε ( = korune ) is a Greek word meaning "club" ( in the sense of "cudgel" or "bludgeon" ) - in reference to certain club-like organs borne by the animal.

== Species ==
- C. brachiata
- C. brevicornis
- C. caespes
- C. crassa
- C. epizoica
- C. eximia
- C. filiformis
- C. fucicola
- C. gracilis
- C. graeffei
- C. hincksi
- C. japonica
- C. muscoides
- C. pintneri
- C. polyocellata
- C. pusilla
- C. sagamiensis
- C. sargassicola
- C. tricycla
- C. uchidae
- C. vanbenedeni
