= Cymbodinium elegans =

Scientific classification
- Domain: Eukaryota
- Clade: Diaphoretickes
- Clade: SAR
- Clade: Alveolata
- Phylum: Myzozoa
- Superclass: Dinoflagellata
- Class: Noctilucophyceae
- Order: Noctilucales
- Family: Kofoidiniaceae
- Genus: Cymbodinium; Cachon & Cachon-Enjumet 1967
- Species: C. elegans

Binomial name
- Cymbodinium elegans Cachon & Cachon-Enjumet 1967

Species of single-celled organism

Cymbodinium elegans is a species of marine dinoflagellates in the order Noctilucales. It is the only species in its genus.
