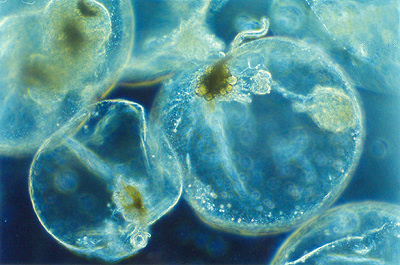
- Noctiluca scintillans

Scientific classification
- Domain: Eukaryota
- Clade: Diaphoretickes
- Clade: SAR
- Clade: Alveolata
- Phylum: Myzozoa
- Superclass: Dinoflagellata
- Class: Noctilucophyceae
- Order: Noctilucales
- Family: Noctilucaceae; Kent, 1881

Genera
- Leptophyllus; Noctiluca; Pronoctiluca

= Noctilucaceae =

Family of single-celled organisms

The Noctilucaceae are a family of dinoflagellates. The family contains the widely distributed species Noctiluca scintillans.
