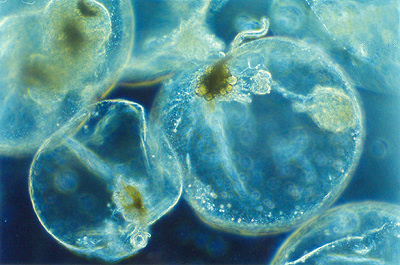

Scientific classification
- Domain: Eukaryota
- Supergroup: Alveolata
- Division: Dinoflagellata
- Class: Noctilucophyceae
- Order: Noctilucales
- Family: Noctilucaceae
- Genus: Noctiluca; Suriray, 1836
- Species: N. scintillans

Binomial name
- Noctiluca scintillans (Macartney) Kofoid & Swezy, 1921

Synonyms
- Genus synonymy: Slabberia Oken, 1815; Species synonymy: Medusa marina Slabber, 1771; Medusa scintillans Macartney, 1810; Noctiluca miliaris Suriray, 1816; Mammaria scintillans Ehrenberg, 1834; Noctiluca marina Ehrenberg, 1834

= Noctiluca =

Bioluminescent, marine dinoflagellate

Noctiluca is a genus of dinoflagellates in the family Noctilucaceae. Its only species is Noctiluca scintillans, a marine species that can exist in a green or red form, depending on the pigmentation in its vacuoles. It can be found worldwide, but its geographical distribution varies depending on whether it is green or red. This unicellular microorganism is known for its ability to bioluminesce, giving the water a bright blue glow seen at night. However, blooms of this species can be responsible for environmental hazards, such as toxic red tides. They may also be an indicator of anthropogenic eutrophication.

== Etymology ==
The name Noctiluca scintillans comes from the Latin Noctiluca, meaning "light at night" and scintillans, meaning "shining, throwing out flashes of light".

== Description ==
=== Taxonomy ===
It was classified with the jellyfish until 1873 when Ernst Haeckel decided to move it to the crystoflagellates with the dinoflagellates. This remained the case until 1920 when Charles Atwood Kofoid finally placed it in the order Noctilucales following certain observations. This classification is still subject to discussion today and the relationship of Noctiluca to the dinoflagellates is not yet clearly demonstrated, as the results of analysis are still too variable to assert a single classification.

At present, it is part of the phylum Myzozoa, which are unicellular flagellated organisms. It is then part of the class Dinophyceae, which has two flagella, the order Noctilucales, whose nucleus is not dinokaryonic in the adult, and the family Noctilucaceae, which has a globular shape with a tentacle.

=== Morphology and anatomy ===
Noctiluca scintillans is a single-celled spheroid organism, ranging from 400 to 1500 μm in length. It moves with the current and cannot really swim. The fact that it is translucent facilitates the observation. N. scintillans has a long cytoplasmic expansion that hangs at the base of a deep groove, close to which is the nucleus. Another identifying feature are the fine striae that start from the central nucleus and extend towards the periphery of the cell. This species is known by the appearance of blue flashes during night dives. N. scintillans should not be confused with Spatulodinium pseudonoctiluca, which is a similar but smaller species (<200 micrometers).

There are 2 colours of N. scintillans. This depends on the pigment present in the vacuoles. The red form is heterotroph. This form of N. scintillans competes with copepods to feed on phytoplankton. The green form has a photosynthetic symbiont inside called Pedinomonas noctiluca which causes the green color. It is mainly autotroph or even photoautotrophic if this photosynthetic symbiont is abundant in the cells.

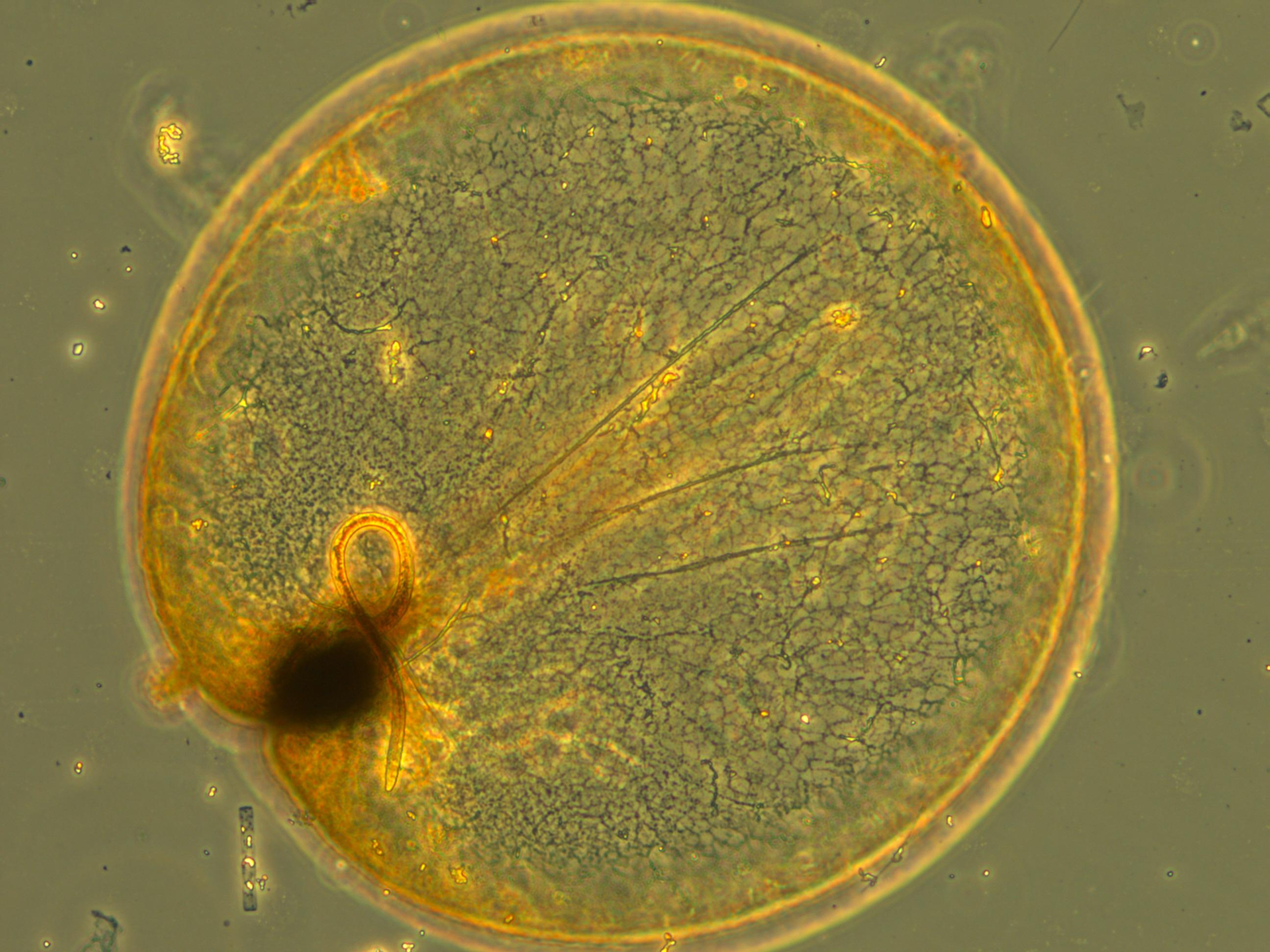
Close-up of Noctiluca scintillans, revealing its photophores

Noctiluca scintillans is a species capable of managing its buoyancy by regulating the intracellular ion concentration. To rise, the concentration of potassium will increase and to fall, it will use heavier elements such as calcium or magnesium.

== Place in the food chain ==
N. scintillans has an important place in the pelagic food chain. N. scintillans is preyed upon by many copepods such as Calanus sp., Temora sp. and Acartia sp., chaetognaths and hydromedusae. Because of their excessive proliferation, they attract many predators due to their very dense aggregations and frequent bioluminescence in this phase of their life.

The diet varies according to the green and red form. The green form is indeed autotrophic if the symbiont Pedinomonas noctiluca is abundant in its vacuole. Otherwise, it is heterotrophic, like the red form. N. scintillans then feeds on diatom aggregates, as well as copepod eggs, naupilar larvae and fish eggs. Noctiluca scintillans is an interception feeder in which its buoyancy is responsible for its ability to encounter prey and feed successfully. Noctiluca scintillans can remain hungry and live for more than 3 weeks.

N. scintillans can be parasitised by Euduboscquella, an intracellular parasite that infects mainly tintinnids but also dinoflagellates.

== Life cycle ==
=== Trophonts ===
Noctiluca scintillans is a heterotrophic dinoflagellate that causes toxic red tides. The life cycle of this species begins as trophonts, which are the non-reproductive adult life stage of many ciliated protozoa. They are eggplant-shaped with a crust consisting of two distinct layers; an outer gelatinous layer and a plasma membrane. Like all eukaryotes, the trophont is composed of a nucleus that lies close to the cytostome surrounded by cytoplasm forming the cytoplasmic center.

=== Gamonts ===
It is with the gamonts, which is the name of the cells during gametogenesis that cell division occurs. These gamonts are produced by a small fraction of the trophonts that spontaneously initiate gametogenesis. During this transformation, the cell becomes spherical and loses some organelles including the tentacle and the nucleus moves to just below the cell surface.

This life cycle continues with two consecutive nuclear divisions to obtain 4 nuclei. This division creates bulges above the cell surface. This is followed by a continuum of synchronous nuclear divisions with each 'progenitor' connected to the others by thin filaments. As gametogenesis progresses, there is a condensation of chromosomes within the different nuclear divisions which darkens the color of the cell. The result is four petal-shaped clusters of progenitors.

=== Zoospores ===
The progenitors of the previous stage have transformed into zoospores. At this point they are evenly distributed in one part of the cell. At the same time as the progenitors are maturing, two flagella start to develop and are actively beating. These flagella develop outside the mother cell and the mature gametes are then released into the surrounding environment. When they have all emerged, the mother cell remains ghostly.

The two flagella formed are not of the same length and therefore do not have the same function. The longer of the two is used for direction of movement in the sea water, while the shorter one provides more of a swimming force to activate the movement.

=== Zygote formation ===
This stage is still highly open to speculation. It seems that Noctiluca scintillans produces isogametes, which are gametes that fuse together to form a zygote. This zygote then has 4 flagella and 2 nuclei. This means that the species is in fact diploid, differentiating it from most dinoflagellates which are haploid.

=== Morphological development from zygote to trophont ===
At the beginning of trophont formation, the number of flagella decreases and the cells become fusiform. During further development they become rounder, and two distinct flagella are formed, one longer and one shorter, and finally only one is left. After this, the outer layer becomes discernible and the crust is formed. The result is a miniature trophont with a tentacle through which it absorbs food to eat by means of viscous materials to which the algae cling.

Thanks to its high specificity, Noctiluca scintillans could increase its biomass up to 100 times in one week.

=== Environmental influences on sexual reproduction ===
Recent studies suggest that gametogenesis in Noctiluca scintillans may be related to environmental stress, water quality, temperature, food abundance, environmental changes, and other factors. In most cases, Noctiluca scintillans does not reproduce sexually, and only occurs when the population size reaches a certain concentration, which is greatly related to the food concentration in the environment.

When the concentration of food sources in the environment changes dramatically (the concentration drops below 400 cells/ml), Noctiluca scintillans will transform from trophonts to gametocyte mother cells, increasing the proportion of gametocyte mother cells in the population (from less than 1% to nearly 10%). When the food supply in the environment decreases sharply, Noctiluca scintillans may reproduce sexually and produce a large number of gametes as another way of survival after the algal bloom occurs.

== Distribution and habitat ==
=== Favorable environment ===
The environment plays an important role in the proliferation of Noctiluca scintillans. The population varies according to sunlight, current, the presence of nutrients (especially nitrate, ammonium and urea), water salinity, temperature and trophic stress. The amount encountered also varies according to the geography and the ocean concerned, although it is present throughout the world.

Noctiluca scintillans is found in temperate, subtropical and tropical waters. It is found abundantly close to the coast; it is a neritic species. It is also found abundantly near the mouths of rivers after heavy rainfall. They are mostly found during the warm seasons, although they can be found all year round.

Extreme conditions for the species are 2 to 31 °C and 17 to 45 psu (practical salinity unit). However, each form has its own preferences and the temperature and salinity ranges are generally more restricted.

The red form is found over a wide temperature range: between 10 and 25 °C and in salty environments. It is very abundant in eutrophic environments where diatoms dominate as this is its favourite food source. The green form is more restricted, with a temperature range of 25-30 °C.

Noctiluca scintillans has consistent spatial and seasonal distribution in the mesoenvironment, with its ability to persist in plankton communities, produce blooms in high concentrations of clematis, accumulate at the surface when the sea is calm, and change its population size according to the water column.

=== Geographical distribution ===
Noctiluca scintillans ranges from tropical oceans to northern seas. It is a cosmopolitan species, found in all seas of the world.

The green form of N. scintillans is mainly found in the tropical waters of Southeast Asia, the Bay of Bengal, the Arabian Sea, the Gulf of Oman, and the Red Sea. The red form is more widespread, and is found in the seas of Central America, Europe, the Black Sea, East, South and Southeast Asia, and the Tasman Sea. It is also found on the coasts of South America and in the seas of West Africa.

The two forms overlap in the western, eastern and northern Arabian Sea with a seasonal difference in abundance. The green form is found in cold waters, with winter convective mixing, while the red form is found in the warmer summer season.

== Bioluminescence ==
This was once a mysterious phenomenon that was called "sea fire" or "sea twinkle" by sailors and coastal dwellers. It is the transformation of chemical energy into light energy by a living being which then emits this light. Bioluminescence differs from fluorescence and phosphorescence because the latter two require contact with light to trigger the phenomenon.

N. scintillans produces luminous flashes, which constitute bioluminescence, during mechanical stress. This phenomenon can therefore be observed in agitated water, i.e. when boats are passing, near the coast at wave level or after water agitation. Bioluminescence is strongest during proliferation.

It is the reaction between luciferase and luciferin that causes the emission of light. This reaction was discovered by the Lyon physiologist Raphael Dubois at the end of the 19th century. He named the two substances luciferase, a thermolabile enzyme, and luciferin, which is preserved by hot water but is present in limited quantities in organisms.

Luciferin combines with luciferase and the two react with oxygen to form an oxidized complex. The luciferin then emits a photon. Of course, the reaction itself is not so simple, in fireflies it also requires two additional cofactors, ATP and magnesium. There are also several types of luciferin and each is associated with a specific luciferase giving different chemical reaction systems.

In the case of Noctiluca scintillans, the chemical reaction occurs in organelles called scintillons. These are dense vesicles that are abundant on the surface of the cell during the night and which bring out the vacuole.

The light is produced by mechanical stimulation due to shear stress. The deformation of the cell membrane causes an action potential across the vacuole membrane caused by Ca^{2+} ions released from intracellular stores. And is involved in the activation of GTP-binding protein coupled receptors in the plasma membrane. Most of the Ca^{2+} ions are released from intracellular stores, while some are released from extracellular sources. Under mechanical disturbance, this action potential releases an influx of protons from the acidic vacuole to the scintilla, lowering the pH from 8 to 6. This changes the conformation of luciferase making it active. Luciferin contains a binding protein that prevents it from auto-oxidizing in an alkaline pH. It releases it by a conformational change in acidic pH, activating luciferin. This activation then allows the enzyme to oxidize luciferin to oxyluciferin. It is this molecule that leads to the emission of photons by an unknown process.

The dinoflagellate luciferase gene (lcf) of Gonyaulacales are currently the focus of scientists' research, while the bioluminescent gene sequences of Noctiluca scintillans do not belong to the Gonyaulacales order, so Noctiluca scintillans is the first representative of heterotrophic dinoflagellates, which helps to understand the extreme diversity of low-carbon fluoride compounds in dinoflagellates. In Noctiluca scintillans, the dinoflagellate luciferase gene (lcf) is highly simplified compared to photosynthetic dinoflagellates. It consists of only a single domain that is shorter than those found in photosynthetic species and exists as a hybrid gene fused with the luciferin-binding protein (lbp). This contrasts with photosynthetic dinoflagellates, which typically have lcf genes composed of three tandemly repeated domains. The structural simplification in Noctiluca scintillans includes a shorter N-terminal region and the absence of three out of four histidine residues believed to be involved in pH regulation, although functional pH sensitivity is retained.

Noctiluca scintillans is one of the most common bioluminescent organisms in coastal areas of the world, its bioluminescence lasts 80 ms. In areas where it is abundant, its bioluminescence acts as a sensitive expressive character and provides an indication of its spatial distribution. There is a large variability in the duration of bioluminescence between species that is not yet explained. But it may be related to the number of scintillations present, the volume of scintillations, the amount of luciferin available and the amount of scintillations stimulated by proton influx which can approach 5% for Noctiluca scintillans.

Some other phenomena influence the intensity of bioluminescence and even its presence. First of all, it has been found that it varies with the circadian rhythm. The molecules are destroyed at dawn and start to be resynthesized at dusk. Their concentration is highest during 4 hours of the night, when it reaches 10 times the daytime concentration.

The intensity of the emitted light is influenced by the physiological status of the cell and also by environmental factors. The intensity is also influenced by the amount of light received during the previous day. This last phenomenon is due to the fact that for species containing chlorophyll (such as the green genus for Noctiluca scintillans), the mechanism of bioluminescence is a little different and depends on the chlorophyll a molecule. Bioluminescence is therefore influenced by cell sensitivity to stimulation, specific response, time, physiology and environmental factors.

N. scintillans is less prone to predation when in this 'phase' of bioluminescence, so this may be one of the functions of bioluminescence. The function of bioluminescence has not yet been proven, it is only a theoretical concept. However, it seems to act as a defence against predators, for oxygen, camouflage and seduction.

N. scintillans is not the only species capable of bioluminescence; Pyrocystis lunula, a dinobiont, or certain bacteria are also capable of it.

== Risks ==
=== Red tides ===
The proliferation of N. scintillans can be toxic, and has been linked to massive mortality of fish and marine invertebrates. However, this species does not produce toxins, which are often the cause of the harmful effect of these tides when they are caused by other organisms. It is actually because of the accumulation of ammonium in excessive quantities and the reduction of dissolved oxygen in the direct ecosystem during its proliferation that N. scintillans is harmful to other species of fish and invertebrates that experience high mortality.

When the concentration of individuals exceeds one and a half million per litre, the water turns pink or orange, hence the name of the red tide phenomenon. In 1970, concentrations of 2,400,000 N. scintillans per litre were found.

This phenomenon is not always red. The colour depends on the pigment in the vacuole of the organism and can be green. (there is a picture in the morphology section).

Other species can also cause red tides, such as species of dinobionts, which are

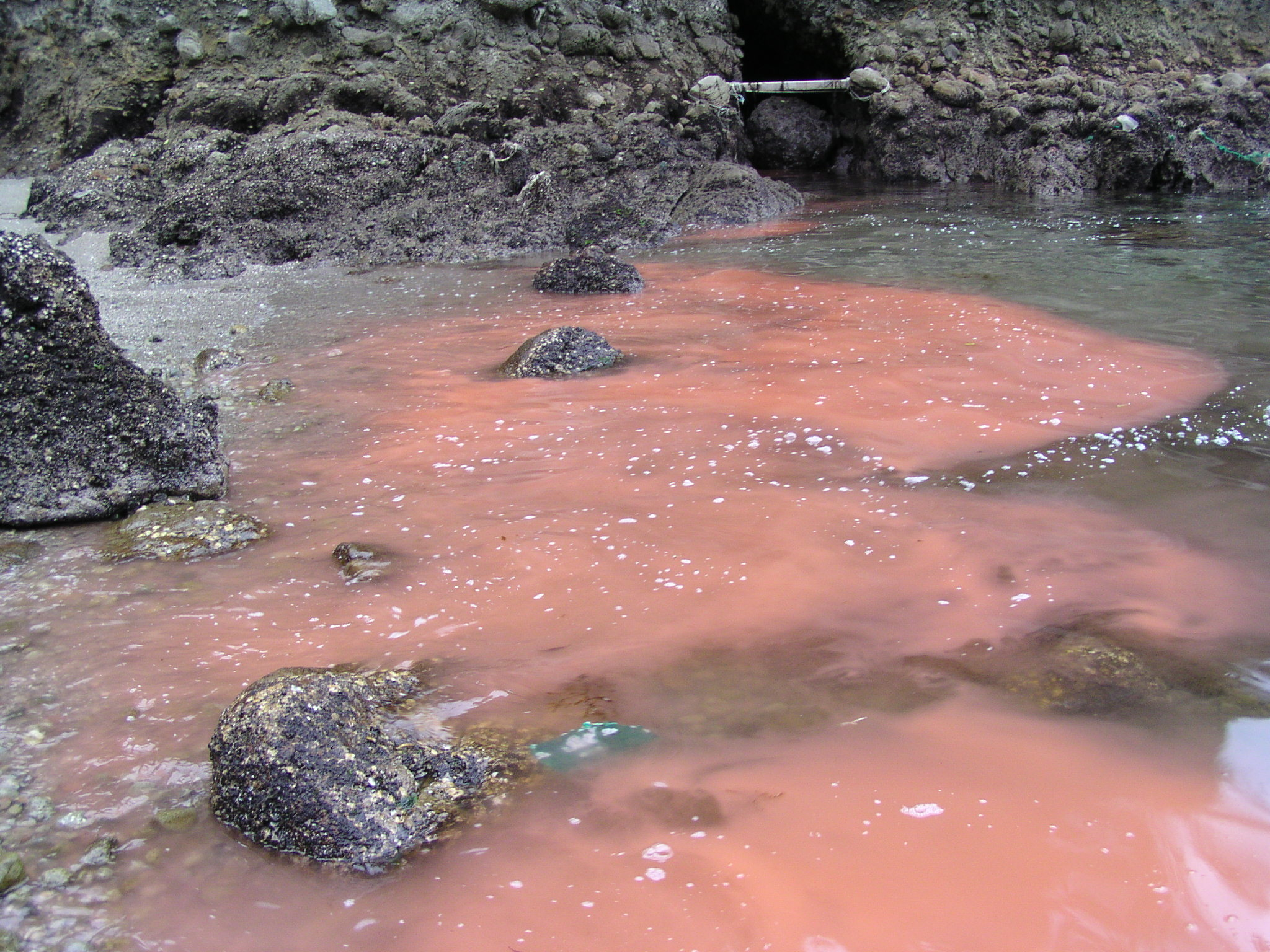
Noctiluca bloom (daytime phase) note that the water is red

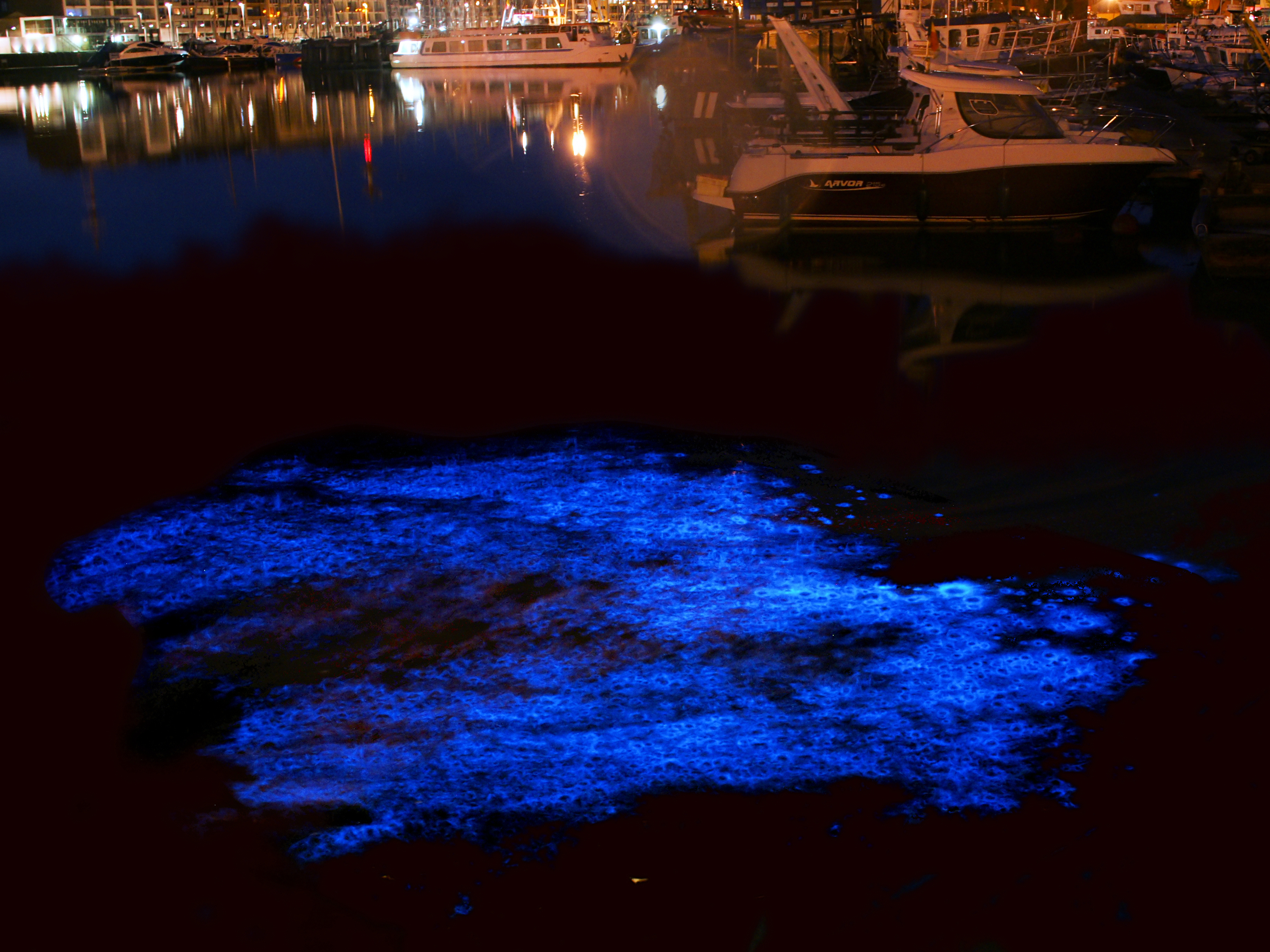
Noctiluca bloom (bioluminescent phase) in Zeebrugge

single-celled organisms with 2 flagella. It is necessary to check under the microscope whether the red tide is indeed caused by Noctiluca scintillans or not.

=== Eutrophication ===
Noctiluca scintillans was first discovered in the Arabian Sea in the 2000s, according to a recent study, which was also the first time that the sea water was undersaturated with oxygen. Since then, winter dissolved oxygen concentrations in the upper euphotic zone have remained low. It has been shown that the species grows best in an environment with abundant light (for the green genus) and with a lower dissolved oxygen concentration, this increases oxygen uptake in the species and further decreases oxygen levels. This allows the species to grow faster and thus creates waves of green Noctiluca scintillans blooms in the Arabian Sea every winter.

The eutrophication of the water is therefore not directly related to Noctiluca scintillans, but the fact that the dissolved oxygen concentration is already slightly low during the monsoon period shows a more consistent development of the species which worsens the situation by increasing its oxygen uptake and decreasing the amount of available dissolved oxygen. This decrease in natural dissolved oxygen is actually caused by the presence of phytoplankton brought in by the hypoxic waters of the Southern Ocean during the monsoon period. To date, this is the only explanation for the arrival of the low oxygen waters.

Another interesting detail is that Noctiluca scintillans produces large amounts of phosphorus and nitrogen in its excretions. The bloom of the species has often been linked to mass mortalities of marine invertebrates and fish but in reality it does not produce toxins, it accumulates lethal amounts of ammonium which is then excreted into the environment. It is during toxic red tides, that the red genus excretes these lethal amounts to the animals around it.

Eutrophication leads to the massive production of microalgae, which in turn provides sufficient food sources for Noctiluca scintillans. Noctiluca scintillans itself may also release nutrients into the environment, affecting the microalgae population. Recent studies have found that when coexisting with the diatom Skeletonema costatum, the growth rate of Noctiluca scintillans is slower, while the opposite is true for Skeletonema costatum. Therefore, Skeletonema costatum may inhibit the growth of Noctiluca scintillans. When the population density and nutrient concentration of the dinoflagellates Heterocapsa steinii and Heterosigma akashiwo increased, the population size of Noctiluca scintillans also increased. In addition, the nutrients released by Noctiluca scintillans will be absorbed and utilized by H. steinii.

=== Impact on coral reefs ===
Coral reefs have been in severe decline in recent decades. According to a study conducted in 2019 in the Gulf of Mannar (South India), hypoxic conditions caused by algal blooms are causing massive mortality of coral reefs.

In this study, it is shown that Noctiluca scintillans causes the death of these corals significantly by overgrowth, as their reproduction causes a decrease in dissolved oxygen of 2 mg/L. This causes lethal hypoxia for corals of the genus Acropora, Montipora and Pocillopora.

There is still a lot of work to be done to find ways to remedy this problem, especially to understand the precise mechanisms of the interaction. Corals are home to 25% of the Earth's marine life. So there is a lot at stake in understanding this.

== Role in the environment ==
Summary of the role of N. scintillans in the environment
Positive effect	Neutral effect	Negative effect
In the food chain	Bioluminescence (role unknown)	Euthrophication, impacts on coral reefs, red tides

== Calendar ==
The phenomenon of bioluminescence is very nice to observe, but it is not found everywhere at any time. Attached is a calendar of peak abundance in different regions of the world and in different months of the year.

Calendar of N. scintillans sightings
Region	Month of the year											
	J	F	M	A	M	J	J	A	S	O	N	D
Northeast Atlantic (Gulf of Gascony)				X								
North Sea (Flemish, Zeeland and Holland coast)						X	X					
Black Sea (central north)					X							
Black Sea (south)					X							
Black Sea (North-East)						X						
Sea of Marmara						X						
Adriatic Sea (North)					X							
North Arabian Sea (Pakistan coast)		X	X									
North West Arabian Sea (coast and open sea)	X	X								X		
West Arabian Sea (Gulf of Oman)		X						X				
East Arabian Sea								X				
Red Sea (North)		X	X									
North East Indian Ocean (Bay of Bengal)				X	X		X	X		X		X
Gulf of Thailand							X	X				
South East Australian Shelf	X											X
North West Pacific Ocean (Japanese Shelf)			X									
