= Stauridiosarsia =

Scientific classification
- Domain: Eukaryota
- Kingdom: Animalia
- Phylum: Cnidaria
- Class: Hydrozoa
- Order: Anthoathecata
- Family: Corynidae
- Genus: Stauridiosarsia; Mayer, 1910

Genus of hydrozoans

Stauridiosarsia is a genus of hydrozoans in the family Corynidae.

== Species ==
- Stauridiosarsia baukalion (Pagès, Gili & Bouillon, 1992)
- Stauridiosarsia bicircella (Rees, 1977)
- Stauridiosarsia cliffordi (Brinckmann-Voss, 1989)
- Stauridiosarsia gemmifera (Forbes, 1848)
- Stauridiosarsia nipponica (Uchida, 1927)
- Stauridiosarsia ophiogaster (Haeckel, 1879)
- Stauridiosarsia producta (Wright, 1858)
- Stauridiosarsia reesi (Vannucci, 1956)
- Stauridiosarsia xiamensis (Xu, Huang & Guo, 2014)
