= Codonium =

Scientific classification
- Domain: Eukaryota
- Kingdom: Animalia
- Phylum: Cnidaria
- Class: Hydrozoa
- Order: Anthoathecata
- Family: Corynidae
- Genus: Codonium; Haeckel, 1879

Genus of hydrozoans

Codonium is a genus of hydrozoans belonging to the family Corynidae.

The species of this genus are found in Western Europe.

Species:

- Codonium codonophorum Haeckel, 1879
- Codonium conicum Haeckel, 1880
- Codonium proliferum (Forbes, 1848)
