= George Johnston (naturalist) =

Scottish physician and naturalist (1797–1855)

George Johnston (1797 – 1855) was a Scottish physician and naturalist.

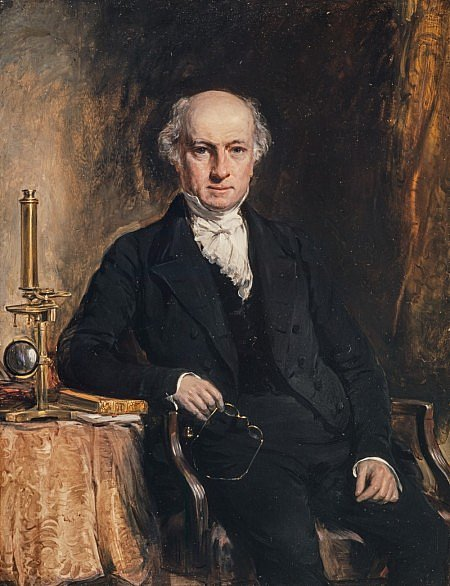
George Johnston, 1849 portrait by William Bonnar

Johnston was one of the founders of the Berwickshire Naturalists' Club and became its first president. His books include The Flora of Berwick-upon-Tweed, History of British Zoophytes, and History of British Sponges and Lithophytes.

== Life ==
He was born at Simprin, Berwickshire, on 20 July 1797. When he was still young, his family moved to Ilderton in Northumberland. Johnston was educated first at Kelso, then at Berwick grammar school, and finally at the University of Edinburgh. He was apprenticed to John Abercrombie, and in 1817, qualifying as a member of the Royal College of Surgeons of Edinburgh, he went to London.

In 1818 Johnston began practice at Berwick-on-Tweed, where he remained. On 23 November 1819 he married Catharine Charles. Catharine illustrated many of his publications. Also in 1819 he graduated M.D. of Edinburgh, and in 1824 became F.R.C.S.E. He was thrice mayor of Berwick, and became LL.D. of Aberdeen. He retired from practice in 1853, and died at Berwick on 30 July 1855. He was one of the founders of the Ray Society and of the Berwickshire Naturalists' Club.

== Works ==
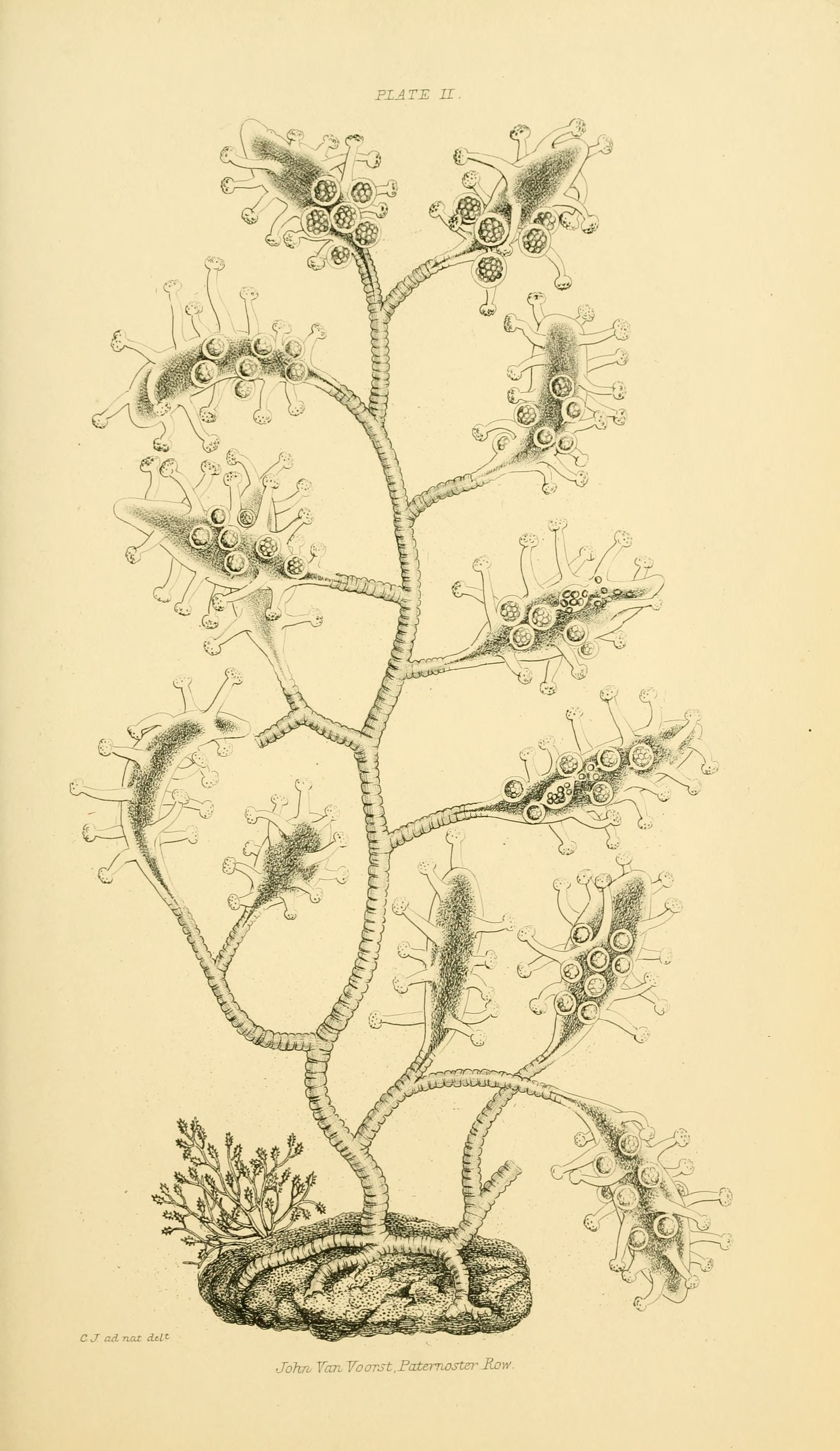
Coryne pusilla, from the History of British Zoophytes

Johnston's independent works were:

- Inaugural Dissertation, Edinburgh, 1819
- A few remarks on the class Mollusca, in Dr Fleming's work of British animals; with descriptions of some new species. Edinburgh New Philosophical Journal Apr-Sep 1828 (Apr-Jun 1828): 74–81., 1828.
- Flora of Berwick-upon-Tweed, vol. i., 1829, vol. ii., dealing with cryptogams, 1831.
- Address to the Inhabitants of Berwick on Cholera, 1832.
- History of British Zoophytes, from the Transactions of the Newcastle Natural History Society, 1838; 2nd edit. 1847. Volume 1 (text); Volume 2 (plates).
- The Molluscous Animals, in the English edition of Georges Cuvier's Animal Kingdom, 1840.
- The History of British Sponges and Lithophytes, 1842.
- An Index to the British Annelides, Annals and Magazine of Natural History, vol. 16, supplement, 1846
- Introduction to Conchology, 1850, reprinted from John Claudius Loudon's Magazine, in which it had the title Natural History of Molluscous Animals.
- Terra Lindisfarnensis: the Natural History of the Eastern Borders, vol. i., Botany, with the popular names and uses of the plants, and the customs and beliefs which have been associated with them, 1853 (no more published).
- Catalogue of the British non-parasitical Worms in the Collection of the British Museum, completed just before Johnston's death, but not published by the trustees until 1865.
- Catalogus animalium et plantarum quæ in insula Lindisfarnensi visa sunt mense Maio, 1854, printed in the Proceedings of the Berwickshire Naturalists' Club, 1873, vii. 46.

Johnston was from 1837 one of the editors of the Magazine of Zoology and Botany, later the Annals and Magazine of Natural History. To it, the Edinburgh Philosophical Journal, Loudon's Magazine of Natural History, the Transactions of the Natural History Society of Newcastle, and to the Proceedings of the Berwickshire Naturalists' Club, he contributed 90 papers.

== Notes ==
Attribution

This article incorporates text from a publication now in the public domain: Lee, Sidney, ed. (1892). "Johnston, George (1797-1855)". Dictionary of National Biography. Vol. 30. London: Smith, Elder & Co.
