= James Crawford Gregory =

Scottish physician (1801–1832)

Dr James Crawford Gregory FRSE (1801–1832) was a Scottish physician and part of the Gregory family of notable physicians and scientists. His middle name is sometimes spelled as Craufurd.

== Life ==
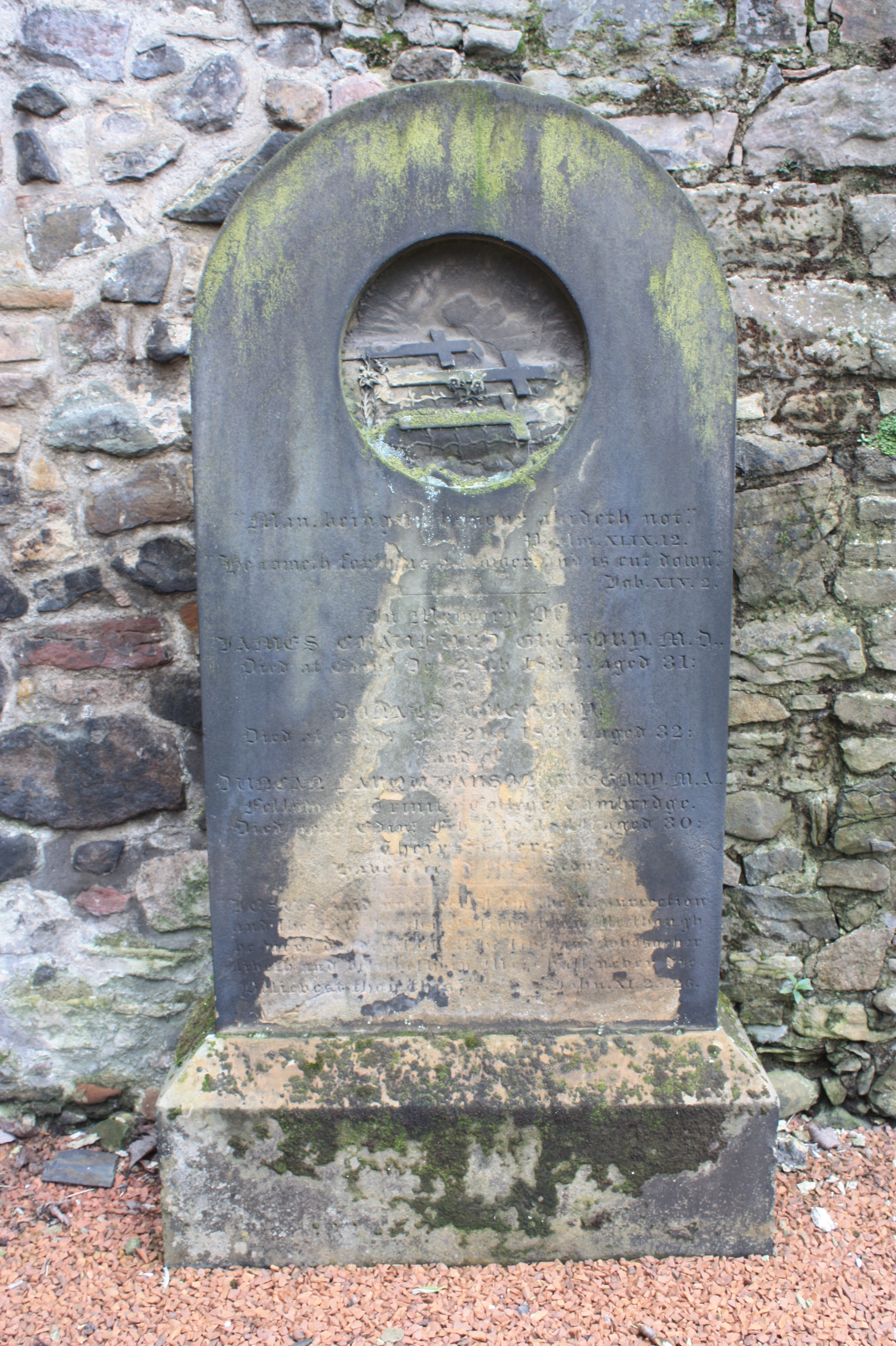
The Gregory grave, Canongate Churchyard, Edinburgh

Gregory was born at 2 St Andrew Square in Edinburgh the son of Isabella (née MacLeod) of Geanies and Professor James Gregory. His siblings included the twins, William Gregory and Donald Gregory. He studied medicine at the University of Edinburgh gaining an MD in 1824. He then spent three years in Paris, France studying under the anatomist Rene Laennec. In 1827, on his return to Scotland, he took on the role as Physician at Edinburgh Royal Infirmary (then on Drummond Street) while also being physician to the Edinburgh Asylum on Bristo Place.

In 1828 he became a fellow of the Royal College of Physicians of Edinburgh. In the same year he was elected a fellow of the Royal Society of Edinburgh, his proposer was Thomas Allan. He served as the society's secretary from 1829 until death. He was also Secretary to the Edinburgh Medico-Chirurgical Society.

During the cholera epidemic he worked at the specifically created Cholera Hospital, housed in Queensberry House on the Canongate in eastern Edinburgh.

He did not marry and lived in the family home for most of his life, the bulk of the family living at 10 Ainslie Place on the Moray Estate in west Edinburgh.

He contracted "malignant typhus" working in the hospital. Despite attention from doctors John Abercrombie and Professor Alison he could not be saved. He died on 28 December 1832. Abercrombie and Alison also contracted typhus but Abercrombie survived the disease.

He is buried in Canongate Kirkyard in the family plot beside Adam Smith's grave in the south-west corner.

== Publications ==
- First Lines on the Practice of Physic, commenced by William Cullen MD completed by James Crawford Gregory (1829, Bell & Bradfute)
