= Coryne muscoides =

Scientific classification
- Kingdom: Animalia
- Phylum: Cnidaria
- Class: Hydrozoa
- Order: Anthoathecata
- Family: Corynidae
- Genus: Coryne
- Species: C. muscoides

Binomial name
- Coryne muscoides Linnaeus, 1761

Species of hydrozoan

Coryne muscoides is a species of athecate hydroid belonging to the family Corynidae. It is a species of the north-eastern Atlantic Ocean and the Mediterranean Sea. This is a many-branched rose-coloured hydroid, up to 15 cm tall with distinctive ringed stems and branches. Each branch ends with a cluster of knobbed tentacles. It can be found in deep rock pools and attached to large seaweeds.
