= Kofoidinium =

Scientific classification
- Domain: Eukaryota
- Clade: Sar
- Clade: Alveolata
- Division: Dinoflagellata
- Class: Noctilucophyceae
- Order: Noctilucales
- Family: Kofoidiniaceae
- Genus: Kofoidinium; Pavillard

Genus of single-celled organisms

Kofoidinium is a genus of dinoflagellates belonging to the family Kofoidiniaceae. It only contains one known species,

The genus was first described by Pavillard in 1929.

The genus name of Kofoidinium is in honour of Charles Atwood Kofoid (1865–1947), who was an American zoologist.

== Known species ==
According to GBIF;

- Kofoidinium pavillardii J.Cachon & M.Cachon, 1967
- Kofoidinium splendens Cachon & Cachon
- Kofoidinium velleloides Pavillard
