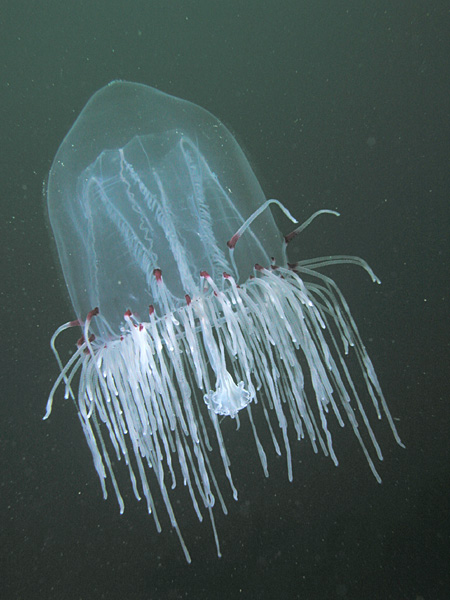

Scientific classification
- Kingdom: Animalia
- Phylum: Cnidaria
- Class: Hydrozoa
- Order: Anthoathecata
- Family: Corynidae
- Genus: Scrippsia; Torrey, 1909
- Species: S. pacifica

Binomial name
- Scrippsia pacifica Torrey, 1909

= Scrippsia =

Genus of hydrozoans

Scrippsia is a genus of hydrozoans in the family Corynidae. It is monotypic with only one species, Scrippsia pacifica.
