= Collectanea de Rebus Albanicis =

The Collectanea de Rebus Albanicis was written by members of the Iona Club of Edinburgh in the 19th century. It contains a transcription and translation of the MS 1467 (then known as MS 1450). The Iona Club was founded in 1833 by historian Donald Gregory and William Forbes Skene to "investigate and illustrate the History, Antiquities and early literature of the Highlands". The club is now defunct.
