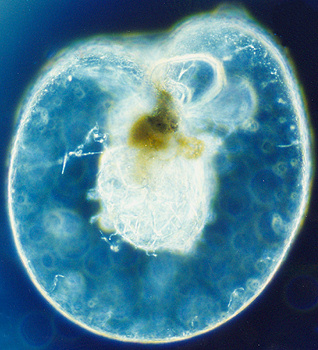

Scientific classification
- Domain: Eukaryota
- Clade: Sar
- Clade: Alveolata
- Phylum: Dinoflagellata
- Class: Noctilucophyceae; Fensome et al.
- Order: Noctilucales; Haeckel, 1894

Families
- Kofodiniaceae; Leptodiscaceae; Noctilucaceae; Protodiniferaceae

= Noctilucales =

Order of single-celled organisms

The Noctilucales are an order of marine dinoflagellates. They differ from most others in that the mature cell is diploid and its nucleus does not show a dinokaryotic organization. They show gametic meiosis.

== Characteristics ==
These cells are very large, from 0.2 to 2 millimetres in diameter, and are filled with large buoyant vacuoles. Some may contain symbiotic green algae, but there are no chloroplasts. Instead, they feed on other plankton, and there is usually a special flagellum involved in ingestion.

Noctilucales reproduce mainly by fission, but sexual reproduction also occurs. Each cell produces numerous gametes, which resemble more typical athecate dinoflagellates and have the dinokaryotic nuclei. Evidence suggests that they diverged from most other dinoflagellates early on, and they are generally placed in their own class.

== Taxonomy ==
- Class Noctiluciphyceae Fensome et al. 1993 [Noctilucae Haeckel 1866; Noctilucea Haeckel 1866 stat. nov.; Cystoflagellata Haeckel 1873 stat. nov. Butschli 1887]
  - Order Noctilucales Haeckel 1894
    - Family Noctilucaceae Saville-Kent 1881
      - Genus Noctiluca Kofoid 1920 [Mammaria Oken 1815 (sic); Slabberia Oken 1815 (sic)]
      - Genus Spatulodinium Cachon & Cachon-Enjumet 1968 ex Loeblich & Loeblich III 1969
    - Family Kofoidiniaceae Taylor 1976
      - Genus Cymbodinium Cachon & Cachon-Enjumet 1967
      - Genus Pomatodinium Cachon & Cachon-Enjumet 1966
      - Genus Kofoidinium Pavillard 1928
    - Family Leptodiscaceae Kofoid 1905
      - Genus Abedinium Loeblich & Loeblich III 1966 [Leptophyllus Cachon & Cachon-Enjumet 1964 non Hope 1842]
      - Genus Cachonodinium Loeblich III 1980 [Leptodinium Cachon & Cachon-Enjumet 1969 non Klement 1960]
      - Genus Craspedotella Kofoid 1905
      - Genus Leptodiscus Hertwig 1877 [Pratjetella Lohmann 1920; Clipeodinium Pascher 1917]
      - Genus Petalodinium Cachon & Cachon-Enjumet 1969
      - Genus Scaphodinium Margalef 1963 [Leptospathium Cachon & Cachon-Enjumet 1964]

== Examples ==
The most common species is Noctiluca scintillans, also called N. miliaris. Blooms of this species are red-orange and can be bioluminescent when disturbed, as are various other dinoflagellates, and large blooms can sometimes be seen as flickering lights on the ocean, known as the milky seas effect.

Another example is Spatulodinium pseudonoctiluca.
