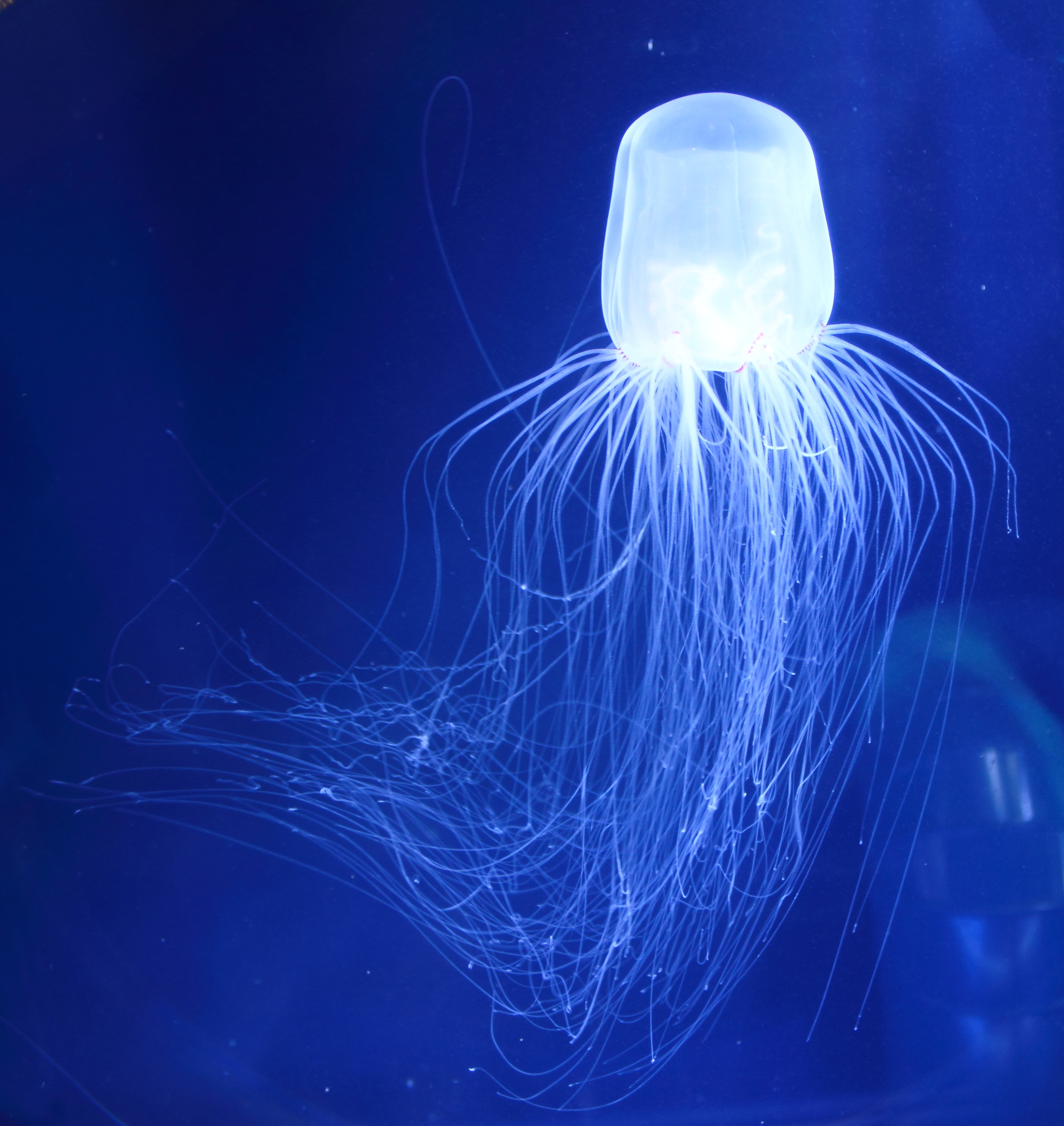

Scientific classification
- Kingdom: Animalia
- Phylum: Cnidaria
- Class: Hydrozoa
- Order: Anthoathecata
- Family: Corynidae
- Genus: Spirocodon; Haeckel, 1880
- Species: S. saltatrix

Binomial name
- Spirocodon saltatrix (Tilesius, 1818)

Synonyms
- Medusa saltatrix Tilesius, 1818; Spirocodon saltator (Tilesius, 1818)

= Spirocodon =

Genus of hydrozoans

Spirocodon is a monotypic genus of hydrozoans with Spirocodon saltatrix as the only species in the genus. It is found in the north-western Pacific Ocean, and was first described in 1818 by the German naturalist and explorer Wilhelm Gottlieb Tilesius von Tilenau.
