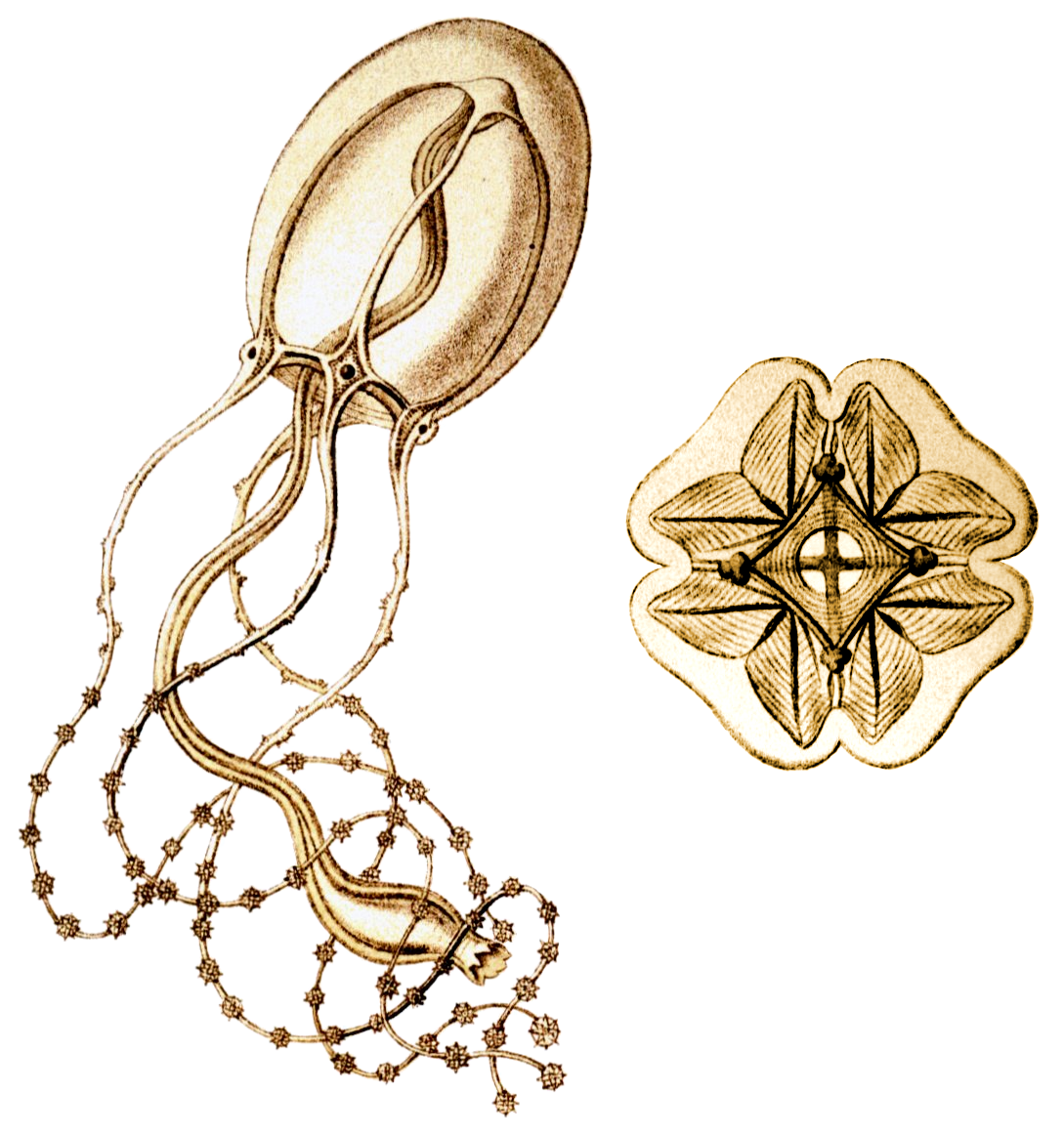

Scientific classification
- Kingdom: Animalia
- Phylum: Cnidaria
- Class: Hydrozoa
- Order: Anthoathecata
- Family: Corynidae
- Genus: Sarsia; Lesson, 1843

= Sarsia =

Genus of hydrozoans

Sarsia is a genus of hydrozoan in the family Corynidae.

== Species ==
- Sarsia angulata (Mayer, 1900)
- Sarsia apicula (Murbach & Shearer, 1902)
- Sarsia bella Brinckmann-Voss, 2000
- Sarsia brachygaster Grönberg, 1898
- Sarsia conica (Haeckel, 1880)
- Sarsia densa (Hartlaub, 1897)
- Sarsia erythrops Romanes, 1876
- Sarsia frutescens (Allman, 1872)
- Sarsia hargitti Mayer, 1910
- Sarsia lovenii (M. Sars, 1846)
- Sarsia medelae Gili, Lopez-Gonzalez & Bouillon, 2006
- Sarsia minima von Lendenfeld, 1885
- Sarsia nana Stechow, 1923
- Sarsia occidentalis (Fewkes, 1899)
- Sarsia occulta Edwards, 1978
- Sarsia ocellata Busch, 1851
- Sarsia piriforma Edwards, 1983
- Sarsia princeps (Haeckel, 1879)
- Sarsia pulchella (Allman, 1865)
- Sarsia pulchella Forbes, 1848
- Sarsia striata Edwards, 1983
- Sarsia tubulosa (M. Sars, 1835)
- Sarsia turricula McCrady, 1859
- Sarsia viridis Brinckmann-Voss, 1980
