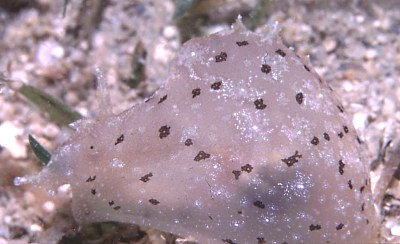
- A live individual of Notarchus punctatus, head end towards the left

Scientific classification
- Kingdom: Animalia
- Phylum: Mollusca
- Class: Gastropoda
- Order: Aplysiida
- Family: Aplysiidae
- Genus: Notarchus; Cuvier, 1817

Species
- See text

= Notarchus =

Genus of molluscs

Notarchus is a genus of sea slugs or sea hares, marine opisthobranch gastropod mollusks in the family Aplysiidae, the sea hares.

== Description ==
The parapodia (fleshy winglike outgrowths) of Notarchus are almost completely fused, forming the parapodial cavity.

== Life habits ==
These sea hares are able to swim by jet propulsion, through sucking in water through the small anterior opening of the parapodial cavity and then squirting water from the back of it. While doing so, they tumble and make a series of backward somersaults. In this unusual manner, they move quickly out of harm's way over short distances.

== Species ==
Species within the genus Notarchus include:

- Notarchus indicus Schweigger, 1820 : Indian sea hare
  - Distribution : in shallow waters of NW Indian Ocean, NW Pacific, Mediterranean.
  - Description : fine papillae scattered over the mantle; no armed penis; feeds on green alga Caulerpa.
- Notarchus punctatus Philippi, 1836
  - Distribution : Japan, Indo-Chinese seas, Mediterranean.
  - Length : 5 cm
  - Description : penis with spines.

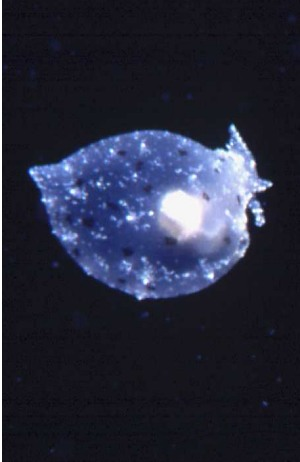
Notarchus punctatus swimming

Species brought into synonymy

- Notarchus ceylonicus Farran, 1905: synonym of Notarchus indicus Schweigger, 1820
- Notarchus pleii (Rang, 1828): synonym of Bursatella leachii pleii Rang, 1828
- Notarchus polyomma Mörch, 1863: synonym of Stylocheilus striatus (Quoy & Gaimard, 1832)
- Notarchus savignyanus : synonym of Bursatella leachii savigniana Audouin, 1826
- Notarchus timidus Risso, 1818: synonym of Elysia timida (Risso, 1818)
