= Catharine Johnston =

British botanical and scientific illustrator (1794–1871)

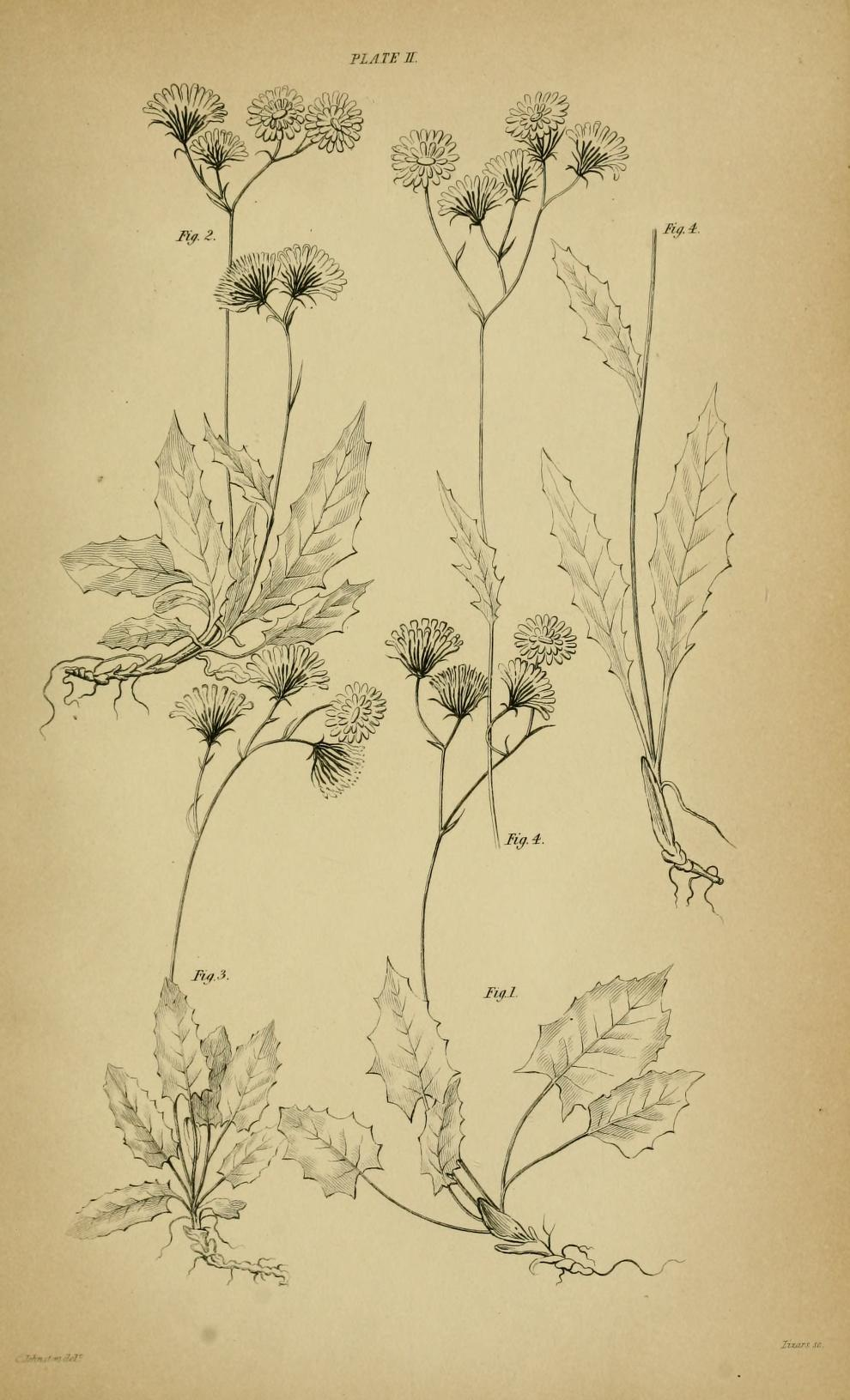
Botanical illustration of Hieracium murorum and Hieracium sylvaticum in Plate II by Catharine Johnston published in The Botany of the Eastern Borders.

Catharine Johnston (née Charles; 1794–1871) was an English botanical illustrator who had a species of marine animal named in her honour.

== Life and work ==
Catharine Charles was born in 1794 and was the daughter of William Claudius Charles, a surgeon who had worked in the West Indies. On 23 November 1819, she married George Johnston, a naturalist, and moved to Berwick-on-Tweed, where the couple resided permanently.

Johnston took an active interest in the study of natural history. She assisted her husband in his natural history investigations and illustrated his publications with scientific drawings. She signed her works C. Johnston. On 21 December 1831, she was made an "Extraordinary member" of the Berwickshire Naturalists' Club. Her drawings assisted other notable scientists to further their research.

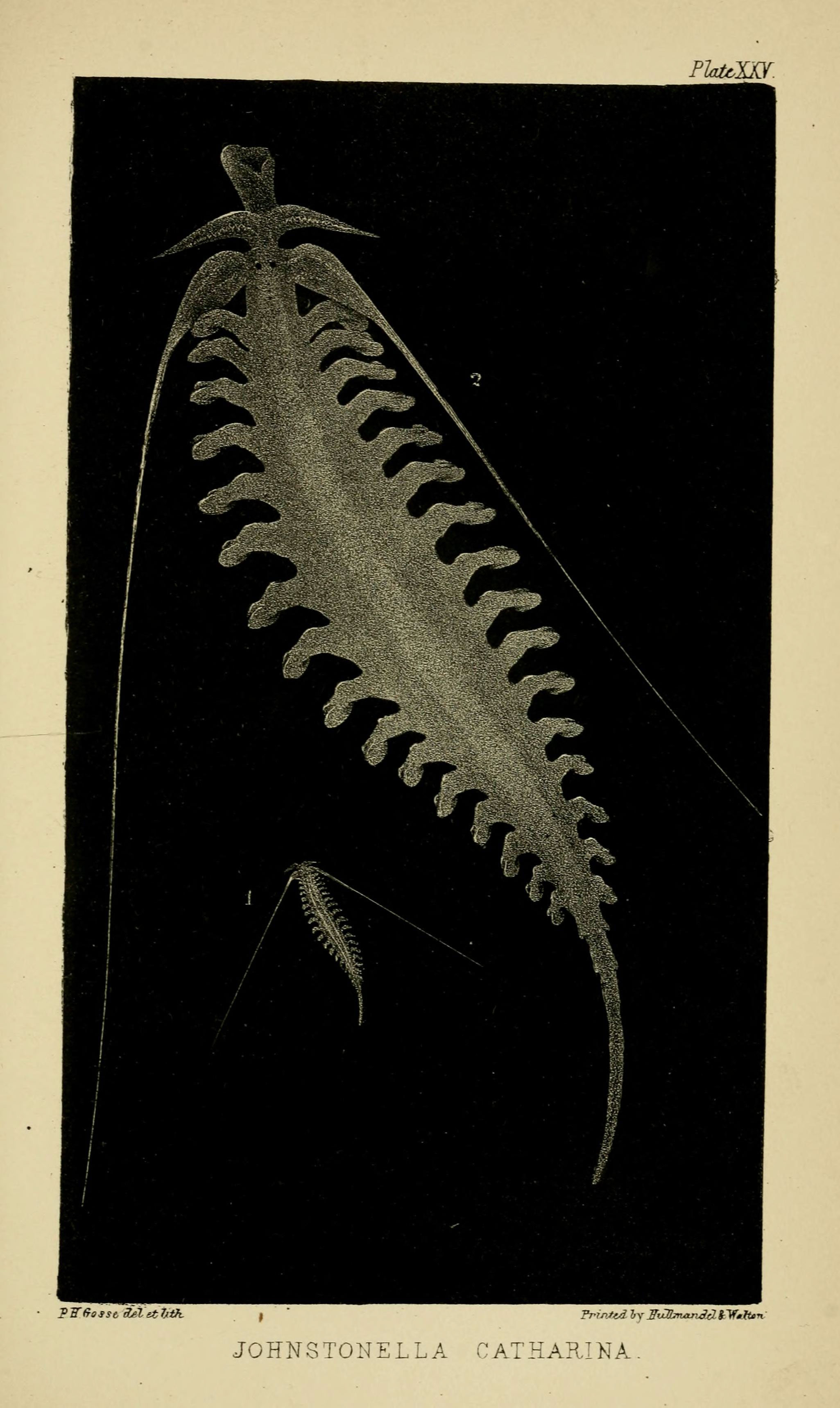
Johnstonella catharina from A naturalist's rambles on the Devonshire coast by P. H. Gosse, 1853.

In 1853 Philip Henry Gosse named the marine species Tomopteris (Johnstonella) catharina in her honor stating:

The crystalline Johnstonella: I have pleasure of announcing a new animal of much elegance, which I believe to be of a hitherto unrecognised form. I shall describe it under the appellation of Johnstonella Catharina. (Plate XXV). ... I venture respectfully to appropriate to this marine animal, the surname and christian name of Mrs. Catharine Johnston, as a personal tribute of gratitude for the great aid which I have derived from her engravings in the study of zoophytology.
