= John Abercrombie (physician) =

Scottish physician and philosopher (1780–1844)

John Abercrombie FRSE FRCSE FRCPE
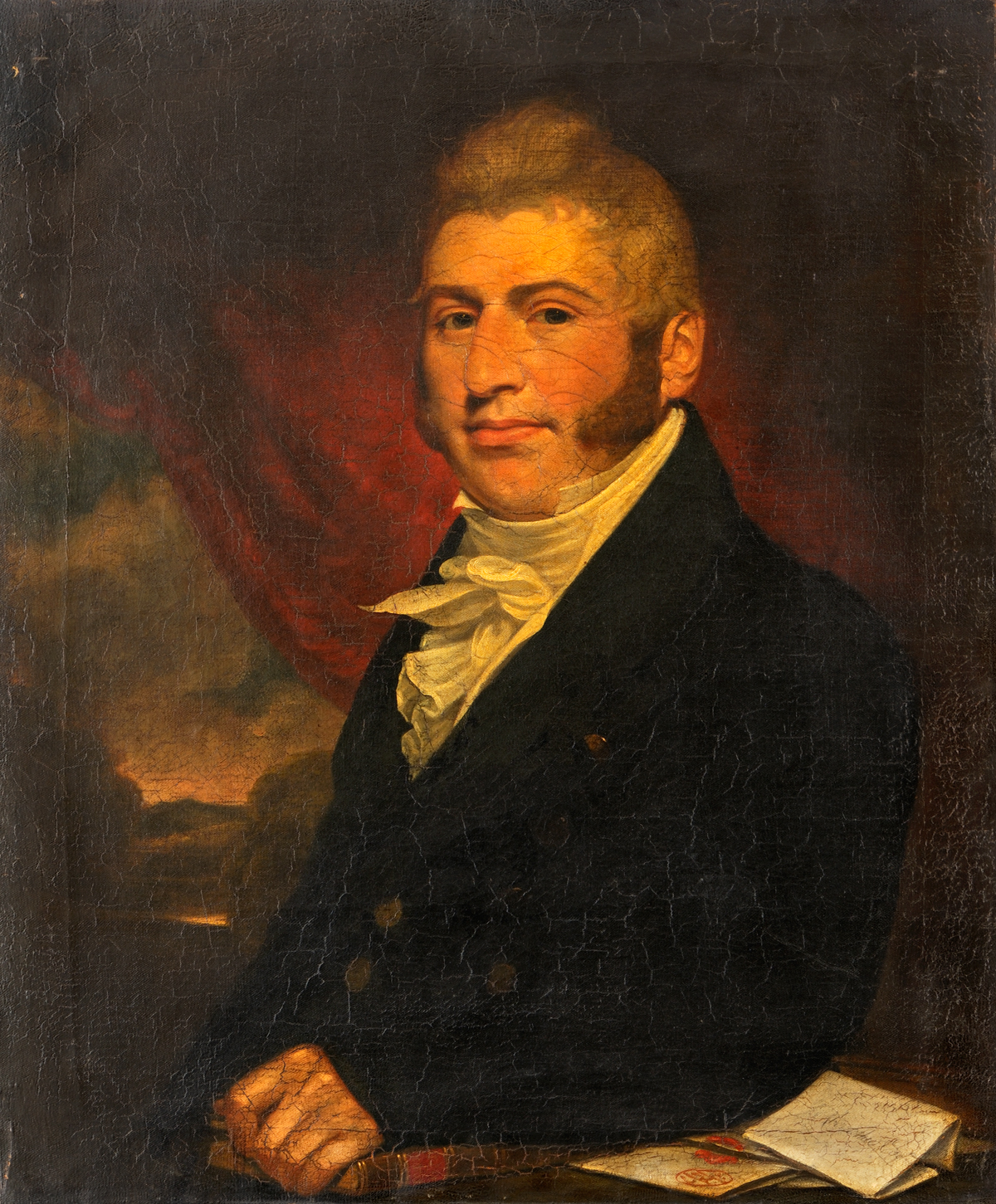
- Born: 10 October 1780; Aberdeen, Scotland
- Died: 14 November 1844 (aged 64); Edinburgh, Scotland
- Education: Marischal College, University of Aberdeen; University of Edinburgh
- Occupations: Physician; philosopher

John Abercrombie (10 October 1780 – 14 November 1844) was a Scottish physician, author, philosopher and philanthropist. His Edinburgh practice became one of the most successful medical practices in Scotland. The Chambers Biographical Dictionary says of him that after James Gregory's death, he was "recognized as the first consulting physician in Scotland". As surgeon to The Royal Public Dispensary and the New Town Dispensary he provided free medical care for the poor of the town and taught medical students and apprentices. He published extensively on medical topics and latterly on metaphysics morality and religion. A devout Christian, he gave financial support to missionary work. Abercrombie was awarded the honorary degree of MD from the University of Oxford, was elected Rector of Marischal College and University, Aberdeen and appointed Physician to the King in Scotland.

== Early life ==
He was born in Aberdeen the eldest son of Rev George Abercrombie (1713–1790), the minister of East Church, Aberdeen, and his second wife Barbara Morice (died 1824). His father was to have a profound influence on his character and beliefs. After schooling at Aberdeen Grammar School he studied at Marischal College, in Aberdeen, where he graduated Master of Arts (MA) at the age of 15. He went on to study medicine at the University of Edinburgh obtaining his doctorate MD in 1803.

== Medical career ==
After graduating he went for further study at St George's Hospital in London and, returning to Edinburgh, set up in practice at 8 Nicolson Street, next to the Edinburgh Riding School, which in 1832 was to become the site of the Playfair building of the present Royal College of Surgeons of Edinburgh (RCSEd). In 1804 he became a Fellow of the RCSEd. His general practice rapidly became popular and in 1805 he became surgeon to the Royal. Public Dispensary in nearby Richmond Street. Here he provided free medical care for the poor of the locality and gave instruction to medical student and apprentices. By dividing the city into geographical sectors and assigning his trainees to different sectors he began a systematic training system for these trainees. In 1816 he was appointed surgeon to the newly established New Town Dispensary. From the outset he kept detailed notes on all of his patients, an unusual practice at that time. These were to form the basis for his many clinical publications, which further enhanced his reputation. From 1816 he published various papers in the Edinburgh Medical and Surgical Journal, which formed the basis of his more extensive works: Pathological and Practical Researches on Diseases of the Brain and Spinal Cord, regarded as the first textbook in neuropathology, and Researches on the Diseases of the Intestinal Canal, Liver and other Viscera of the Abdomen, both published in 1828. In the latter book described for the first time the symptoms and signs of perforated duodenal ulcer. This was at a time when, it was difficult for physicians to correlate clinical features with pathology. Abercrombie's gave the first ever description of the clinical features of perforated duodenal ulcer confirmed by the post-mortem. The specimen showing the perforated ulcer was placed in Surgeons’ Hall Museum where it is on display to this day

In 1821 he was unsuccessful in his application for the Chair of the Practice of Physic at the University of Edinburgh. Thereafter he devoted himself to consulting medical practice. He became a Licentiate of the Royal College of Physicians of Edinburgh in 1823 and a Fellow of the College the following year.

In later years he wrote a series of philosophical speculations, and in 1830 he published his Inquiries concerning the Intellectual Powers and the Investigation of Truth, which was followed in 1833 by a sequel, The Philosophy of the Moral Feelings. Both works achieved wide popularity at the time of their publication. The Inquiries (1830) has been widely cited in treatises on the law of evidence, due to its discussion of probability, (the sources of) certainty, and (doubts regarding) testimony.

An elder of the Church of Scotland, he also wrote The man of faith: or the harmony of Christian faith and Christian character (1835), which he distributed freely.

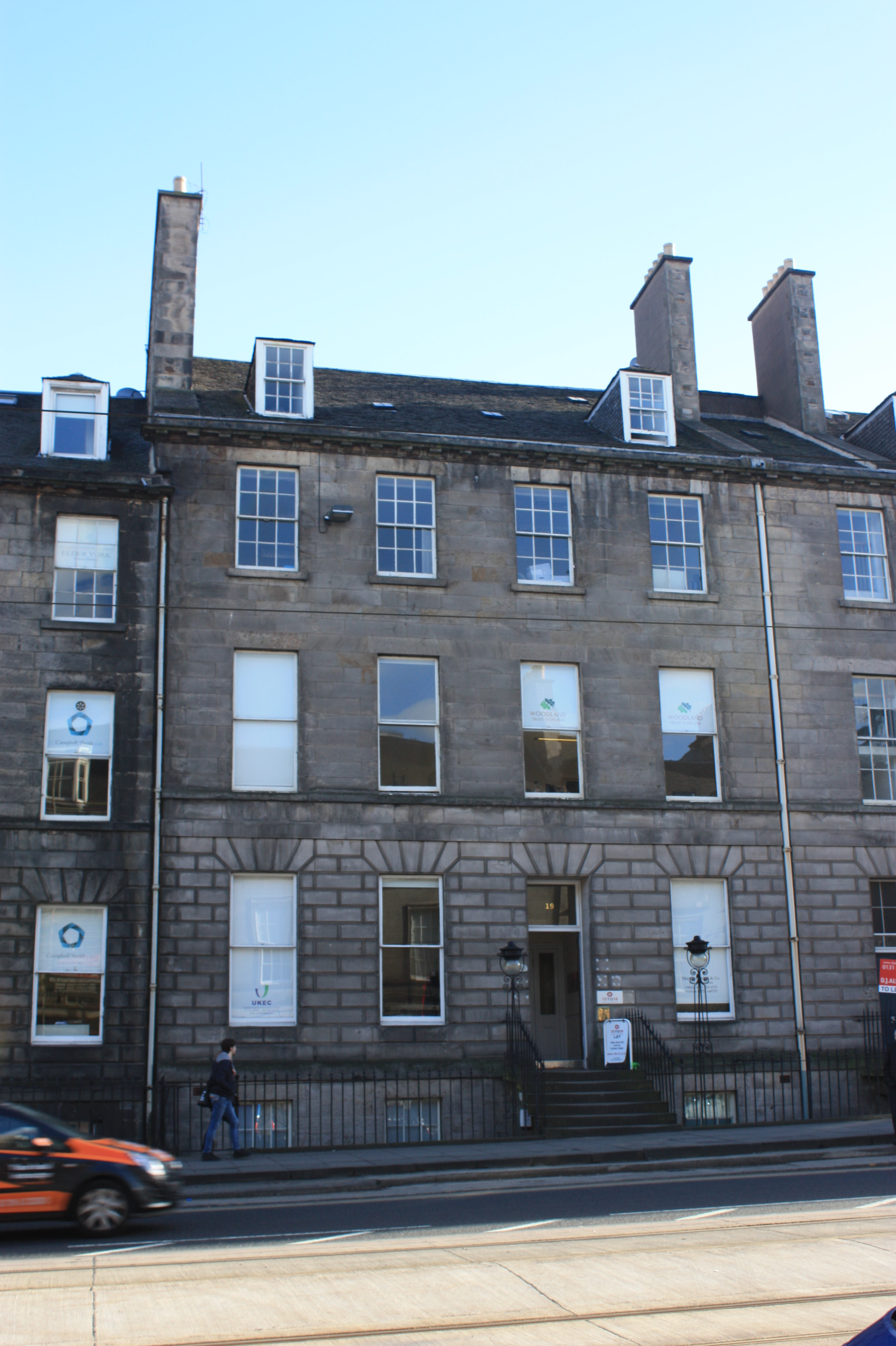
19 York Place, Edinburgh

Abercrombie was a founder member in 1841of the Edinburgh Association for sending Medical Aid for Foreign Countries, which became the Edinburgh Medical Missionary Society, and he gave financial support to its work.

The year after his death his Essays (1845) on Christian ethics were published.

== Honours and awards ==
He was President of the Edinburgh Medico-Chirurgical Society for four years from 1829. In 1831 he was elected a Fellow of the Royal Society of Edinburgh, his proposer being Thomas Charles Hope, and served as Vice-President of the Society from 1835 to 1844. The University of Oxford awarded him the honorary degree of MD (Oxon). This was a rare honour as the only other recipient in the previous 50 years was Edward Jenner. He was elected Lord Rector of Marischal College and University, Aberdeen. He became a member of the French Académie Nationale de Médecine.

== Personal life ==
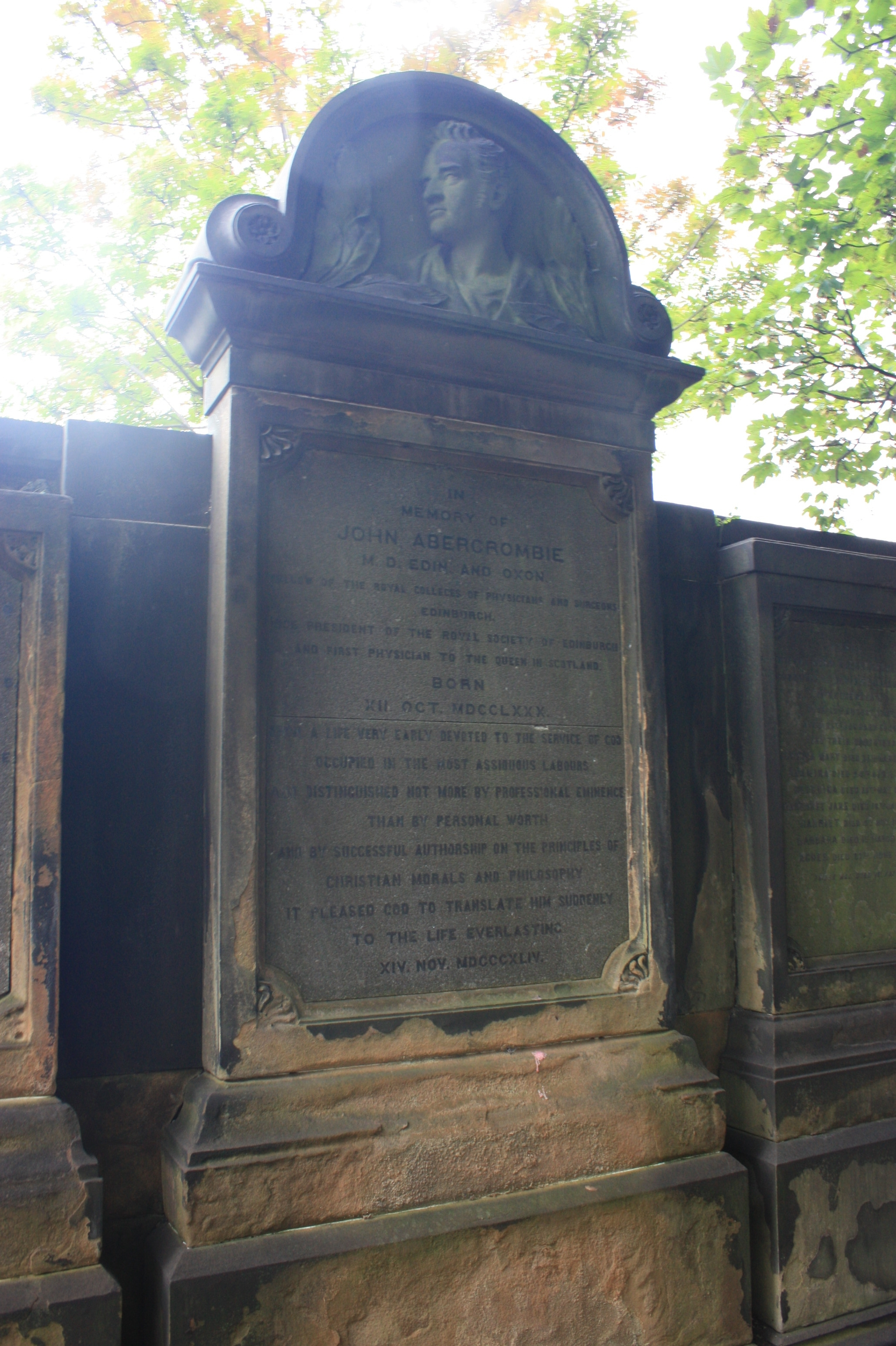
The grave of John Abercrombie, St Cuthberts, Edinburgh

In 1810 he was living at 43 York Place, Edinburgh. In 1831, while treating his colleague James Crawford Gregory, he contracted and recovered from typhus. In 1841, he was partially paralysed, but was nevertheless able to return to his medical practice.

He died suddenly while entering his carriage at the front of his home, 19 York Place, Edinburgh, 14 November 1844. An autopsy showed that the cause of death was ruptured coronary artery. The pathologist, Adam Hunter, speculated that his death had been brought about by excessive bloodletting. He is buried against the east wall of St Cuthberts Churchyard adjacent to the gateway into Princes Street Gardens.

Upon his death, his daughters donated his Abercrombie's library of circa 1000 volumes to the Royal College of Surgeons of Edinburgh.

== Artistic recognition ==
A bust of Abercrombie by John Steell is held at the Royal College of Physicians of Edinburgh. A portrait by Benjamin Walsh, painted in 1819, hangs in the RCSEd.

== See also ==
- Pathology
- List of pathologists

Academic offices
Unknown	Rector of Marischal College, Aberdeen; 1835—?	Unknown
