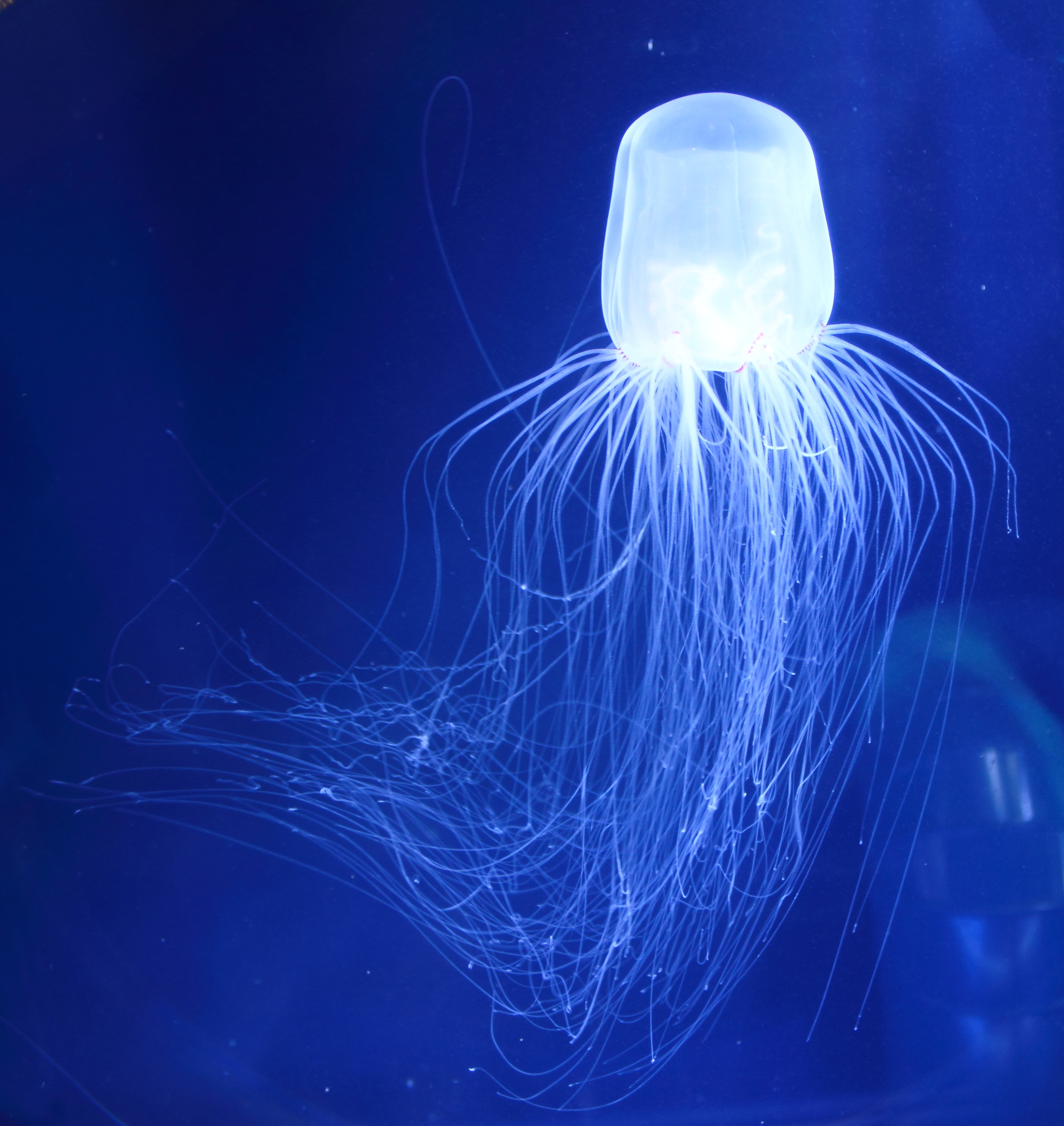

Scientific classification
- Kingdom: Animalia
- Phylum: Cnidaria
- Class: Hydrozoa
- Order: Anthoathecata
- Suborder: Capitata
- Family: Corynidae; Johnston, 1836

Genera
- see text

Synonyms
- Cladosarsiidae Bouillon, 1978; Codonidae Haeckel, 1879; Dicyclocorynidae; Polyorchidae Agassiz, 1862; Sarsiadae Forbes, 1848; Syncorynidae Allman, 1872

= Corynidae =

Family of hydrozoans

Corynidae is a family of hydrozoans in the order Anthomedusae.

== Derivation of family name ==
The family name Corynidae is derived from the Greek word κορυνε ( = korune ) meaning "club" ( in the sense of "cudgel" or "bludgeon" ).

== Genera ==
The following genera are included in the family:

- Bicorona Millard, 1966
- Caltsacoryne Toshino, Hamatsu & Uchida, 2021
- Cladosarsia Bouillon, 1978
- Codonium Haeckel, 1879
- Coryne Gaertner, 1774
- Dicyclocoryne Annandale, 1915
- Dipurenella Huang, Xu & Guo, 2011
- Nannocoryne Bouillon & Grohmann, 1994
- Polyorchis A. Agassiz, 1862
- Sarsia Lesson, 1843
- Scrippsia Torrey, 1909
- Slabberia Forbes, 1846
- Spirocodon Haeckel, 1880
- Stauridiosarsia Mayer, 1910
