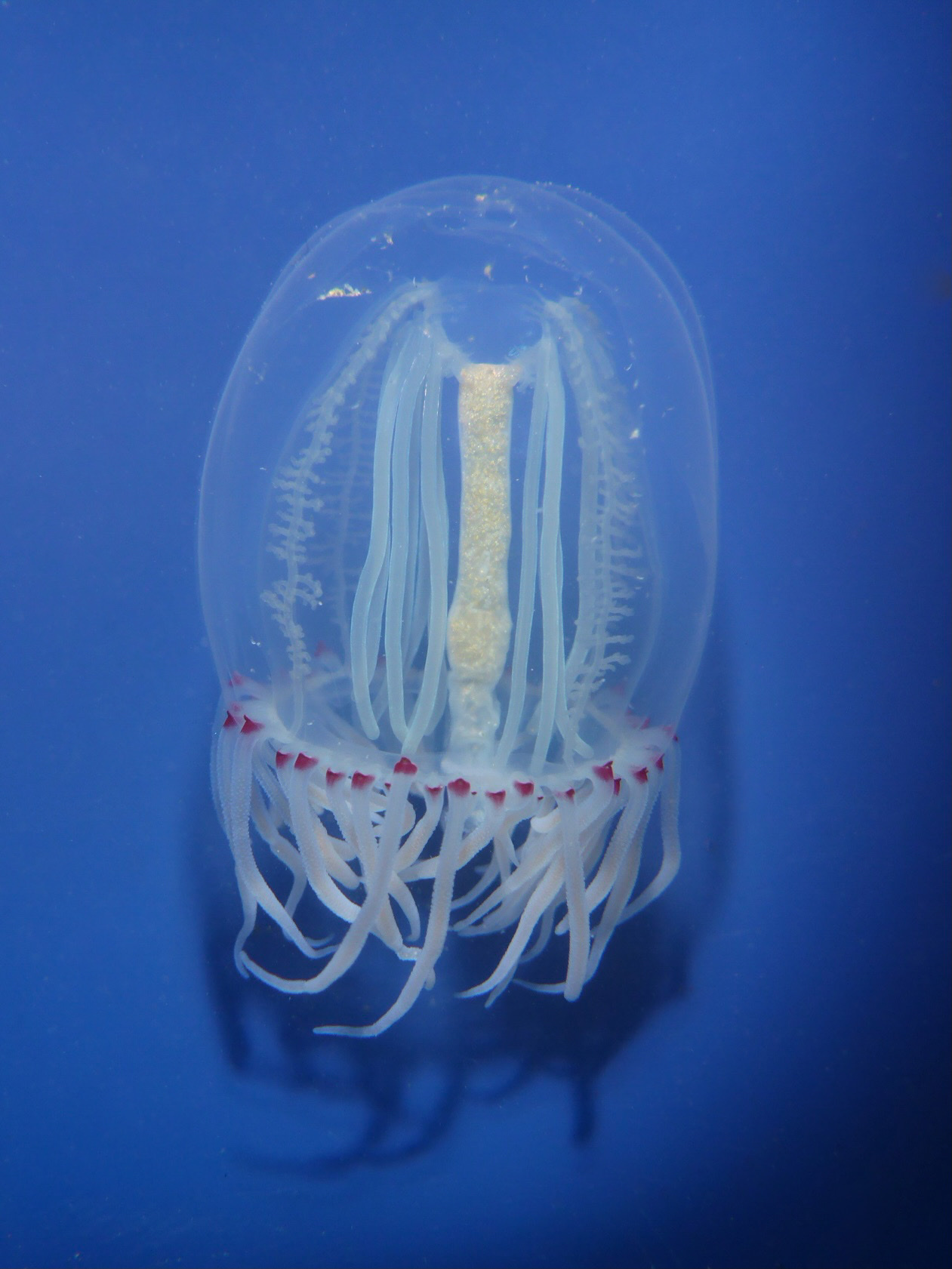
- Polyorchis penicillatus

Scientific classification
- Kingdom: Animalia
- Phylum: Cnidaria
- Class: Hydrozoa
- Order: Anthoathecata
- Family: Corynidae
- Genus: Polyorchis; A. Agassiz, 1862

Species
- Polyorchis haplus; Polyorchis karafutoensis; Polyorchis penicillatus

= Polyorchis =

Genus of hydrozoans

Polyorchis, or bell jellies, is a genus of hydrozoans in the family Corynidae. The bells can reach about 2.25 inches (5 cm).They are often found in harbors, marinas, and other calm waters close to shore. They feed on plankton and benthic crustaceans and are found near the sea floor. This page discusses the species' general morphology, geographic range and habitat, and diet.

== General Morphology ==
Polyorchis are at least as tall as they are wide, reaching up to 60 millimeters in height and averaging 20 millimeters in width. They have a fragile, non-gelatinous bell membrane, and they have a whorl of around 100 - up to 160 - unbranched individual tentacles connected at the bell's margin.

They have a well-developed velum, which are common in Hydroid medusae for means of greater thrust when contracting their bell during movement. Running from top to bottom inside the bell are four simple radial canals with 15-25 pairs of lateral blind-sided channels called diverticula. Radial canals are part of the digestive system, aiding with nutrient distribution across the bell.

Polyorchis are transparent with red coloration in their internal organs and eye spots around the rim of their bell. The red pigmentation helps them camouflage. P. penicillatus is nicknamed "red-eyed jellyfish", because at the base of the tentacles are several eyes, called ocelli, which contain light-sensing cells and red pigments.

Extending the entire length of the bell cavity, the manubrium is a tubular stalk that starts from a short gastric peduncle at the top of the bell and ends at the mouth in the center of the underside of the bell. It is connected to the gastrovascular cavity and has four frilly lips, also called oral arms, that surround the mouth and help with food capture.

== Geographical Range and Habitat ==
Polyorchis are found along the west coast of North America. P. penicillatus have been seen from the Aleutian Islands of Alaska to the Sea of Cortez in Mexico. The geographical location that the species was most likely first discovered and described is San Francisco Bay in Northern California.

They are a coastal species, often found in shallow waters, like harbors and marinas, and around docks. Throughout their geographic range, they are found in both temperate and cold waters, and they spend most of their time near the bottom of the ocean.

== Diet ==
P. penicillatus feed on bottom-dwelling crustaceans and other microorganisms. They press their manubrium (mouth) to the ocean floor to feed on organisms living on the bottom of the ocean, relying on their tentacles for stability. For water column feeding, they extend their tentacles and let the ends flow down. Sometimes they drift slowly downward towards the ocean floor, waiting for predators to come into contact with their tentacles. Polyorchis use their tentacles to transport their prey to their mouth.
