= Slabberia =

Scientific classification
- Domain: Eukaryota
- Kingdom: Animalia
- Phylum: Cnidaria
- Class: Hydrozoa
- Order: Anthoathecata
- Family: Corynidae
- Genus: Slabberia; Forbes, 1846

Genus of hydrozoans

Slabberia is a genus of hydrozoans belonging to the family Corynidae.

The species of this genus are found in Europe, Northern America, Northern Africa, Japan.

Species:

- Dipurena dolichogaster Haeckel, 1864
- Dipurena quanzhouensis Xu, Huang & Guo, 2014
- Slabberia halterata Forbes, 1846
- Slabberia simulans (Bouillon, 1965)
- Slabberia strangulata (McCrady, 1859)
