= Eleutheria (disambiguation) =

Eleutheria is an ancient and modern Greek term for, and personification of, liberty.

Eleutheria may also refer to:

- Eleutheria (Plataea), an ancient Greek festival held at Plataea in honor of Zeus Eleutherius
- Eleutheria (Samos), an ancient Greek festival held on Samos in honor of Eros
- Eleutheria (cnidarian), a genus of hydrozoans
- Eleutheria (play), a posthumously published play by Samuel Beckett
- "Eleutheria", a song by Jason Webley from the 1999 album Against the Night
- "Eleutheria", a song by Lenny Kravitz from the 1993 album Are You Gonna Go My Way
- Eleutheria, a student co-operative at Michigan State University; see Student Housing Cooperative at Michigan State University

== See also ==
- Eleuthera, an island in the Bahamas
- Eleutherion, an ancient Byzantine port near Istanbul, Turkey
