= Novius =

Novius may refer to:

- Decimus Junius Novius Priscus, consul of the Roman Empire in 78
- Quintus Novius, Roman dramatist of the first century BCE
- Tiberius Claudius Novius, leading statesman of Athens 41-61
- River Nith, in Scotland; Novius in Latin sources
- Novius (beetle), a genus of Australian ladybugs
