= Cladonema =

Cladonema may refer to:

- Cladonema (cnidarian), a genus of hydrozoans
- Cladonema (alga), a genus of algae in the family Chromulinaceae
