= Tiberius Claudius Novius =

1st century AD Athenian statesman

Tiberius Claudius Novius (Ancient Greek: Τιβέριος Κλαύδιος Νούιος Φιλείνου υἱός, ἐξ Οἴου, romanized: Tiberios Klaudios Nouios Phileinou huios ex Oiou, fl. AD 40s–61) was the leading Athenian statesman in the mid-first century AD, as a result of his wealth and connections to the Emperors Claudius and Nero. He served as hoplite general, the chief Athenian magistrate, an unprecedented eight times and organised a number of festivals and construction projects in honour of Claudius and Nero, including a new stage building in the Theatre of Dionysus and a monumental bronze inscription in honour of Nero on the Parthenon.

== Life ==
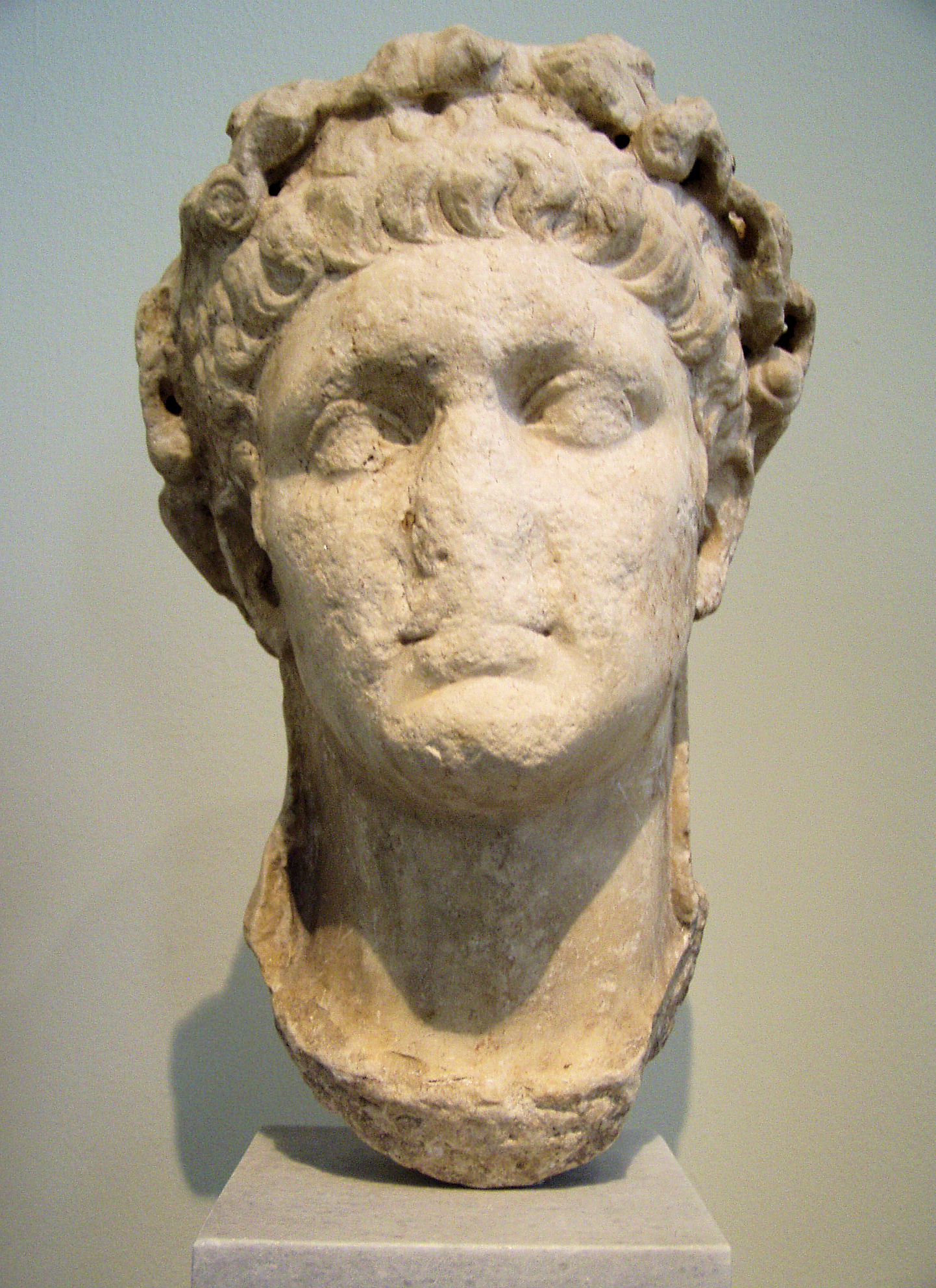
Portrait bust of Claudius in the National Archaeological Museum of Athens (NAMA inv. 439).

Novius' name is of Campanian origin, suggesting that he was descended from the Italian negotiatores, who had taken up residence in the Aegean region, especially on Delos in the 1st century BC. He was the son of one Philinos and it is possible that an Athenian father and grandfather are attested in an inscription from ca. 20 BC.

Novius probably served as the eponymous archon of Athens in the mid-30s AD. He was hoplite general, the chief magistrate of Athens in this period, in AD 40/1, the year of Emperor Claudius' accession, and celebrated the occasion by funding and organising "Sebasta" (Augustan) games in the Emperor's honour (IG II^{2} 3270). He also organised and paid for a statue of the legatus and propraetor (governor) of Achaia and Moesia in that year, Publius Memmius Regulus, whom he names as "his own benefactor" (IG II^{2} 4174). The hoplite general was in charge of Athens' grain supply and Geagan suggests that Regulus' benefaction had been helping Novius secure supplies of Moesian grain for Athens. Within the next year, the Emperor granted him Roman citizenship, along with his praenomen and nomen, Tiberius Claudius, which Novius used thereafter.

In AD 42, Novius was Herald of the Areopagus, became Priest of Delian Apollo, and oversaw the construction of a monument erected by the city of Athens for Emperor Claudius "the saviour and benefactor" (IG II^{2} 3271). Schmalz suggests that this was the rededication of an existing monument next to the north-eastern corner of the Parthenon, originally erected for king Attalus II of Pergamum.

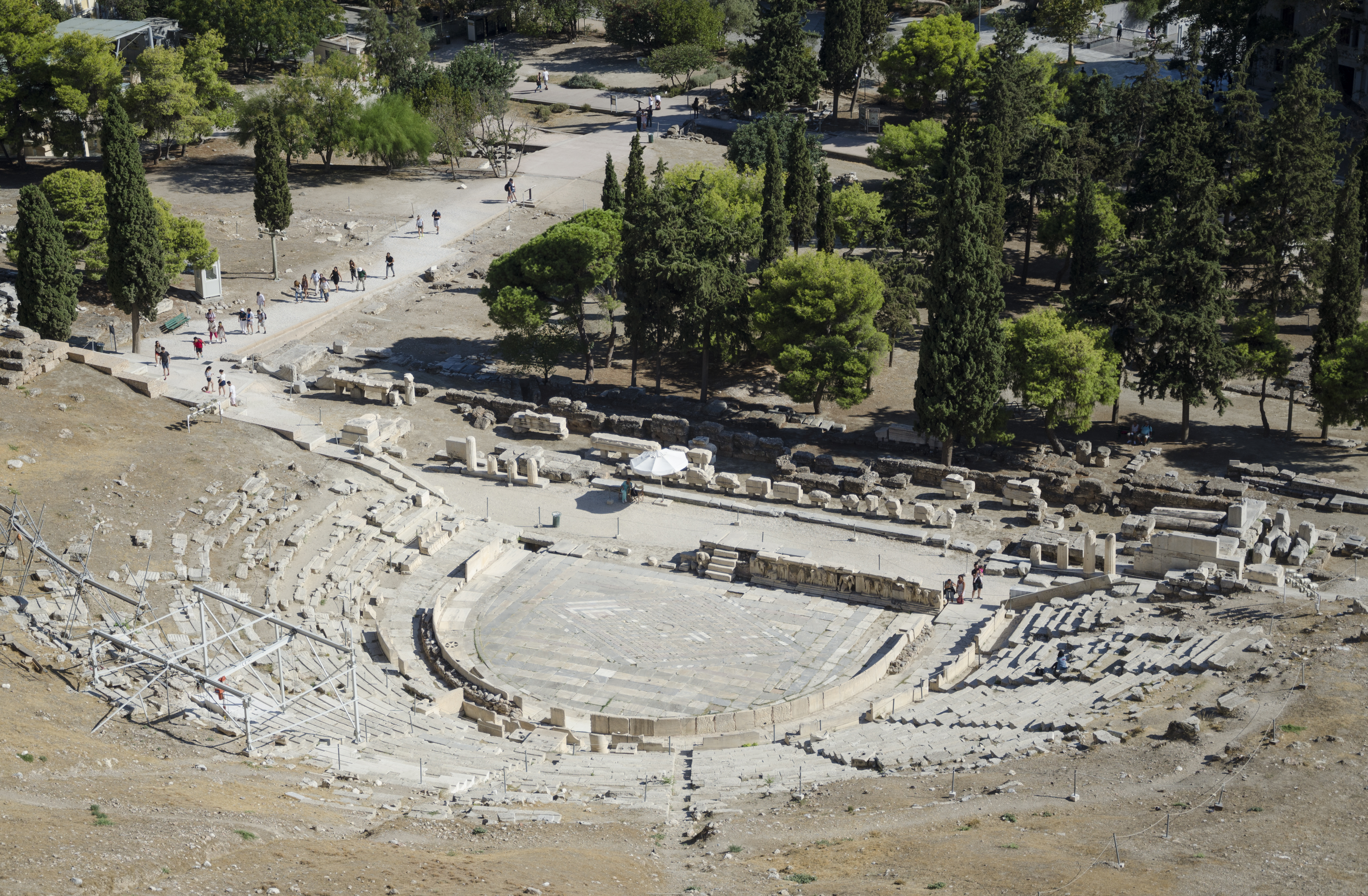
View of the Theatre of Dionysus, looking towards the location of the stage building.

In the following years, Novius was hoplite general for a second time, gymnasiarch twice, and, in AD 43 or 47, he was hoplite general for a third time and organised the Great Panathenaea festival (I Delos 1628).

In AD 51, Novius was hoplite general for the fourth time, overseeing the erection of a statue of Claudius "saviour of the cosmos" (IG II^{2} 3273) and organised the Panathenaia festival again - now called the Great Panathenaia Sebasta - as well as a separate festival, the Caesarea Sebasta. For this, the Athenians rewarded him with a statue (IG II^{2} 3535), which records that he was now High Priest of Antonia Augusta (Claudius' deceased mother), and named him "lover of Caesar and lover of his fatherland."

As hoplite general for the seventh time in the reign of Emperor Nero, Novius oversaw and paid for the construction of a new stage building in the Theatre of Dionysus, which was dedicated jointly to Dionysus Eleuthereus and Emperor Nero (IG II^{2} 3182). For this, he seems to have been rewarded with another statue, erected by Marcus Porcius Cato, who was the son of the consul of 36 and had settled in Athens.

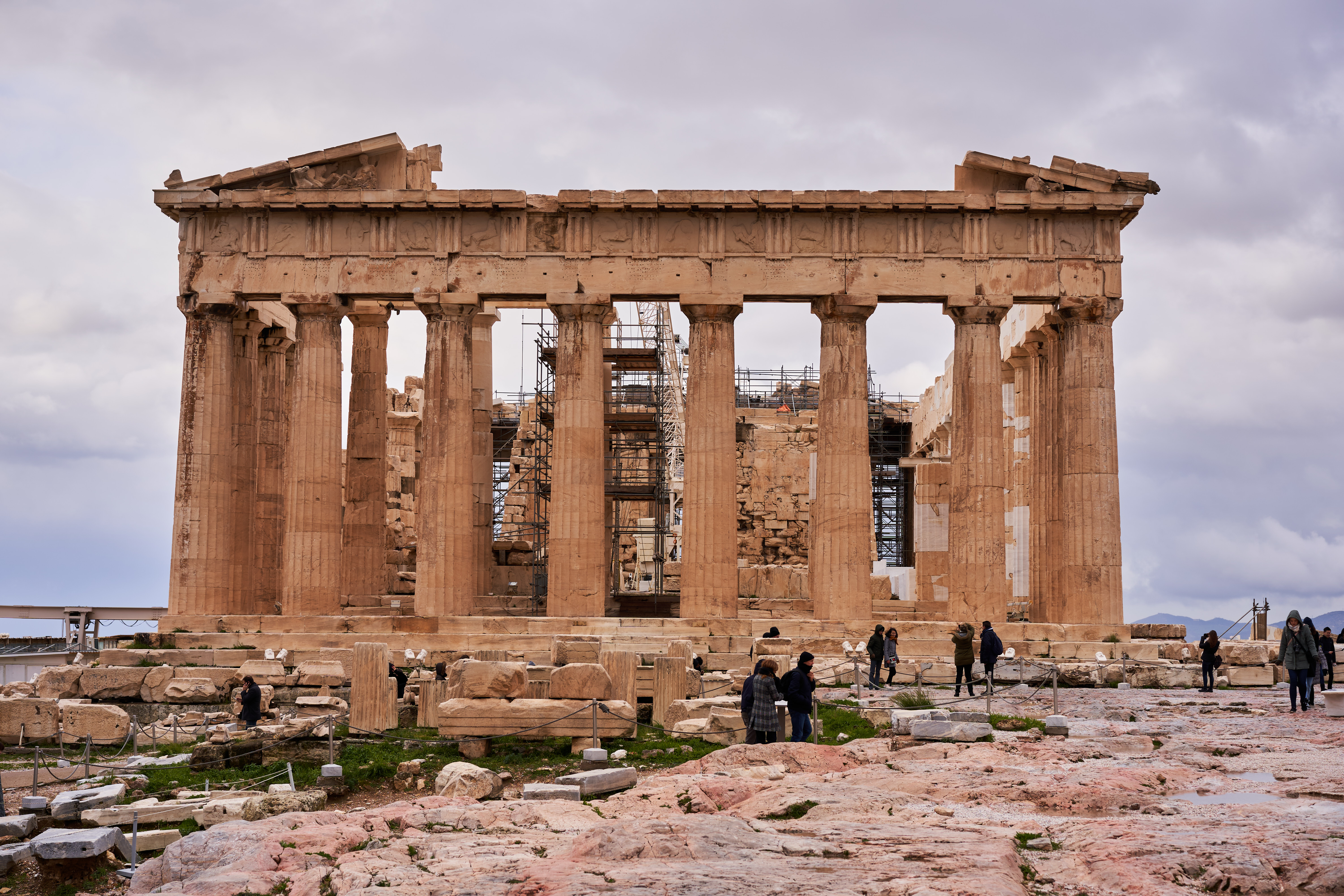
East facade of the Parthenon.

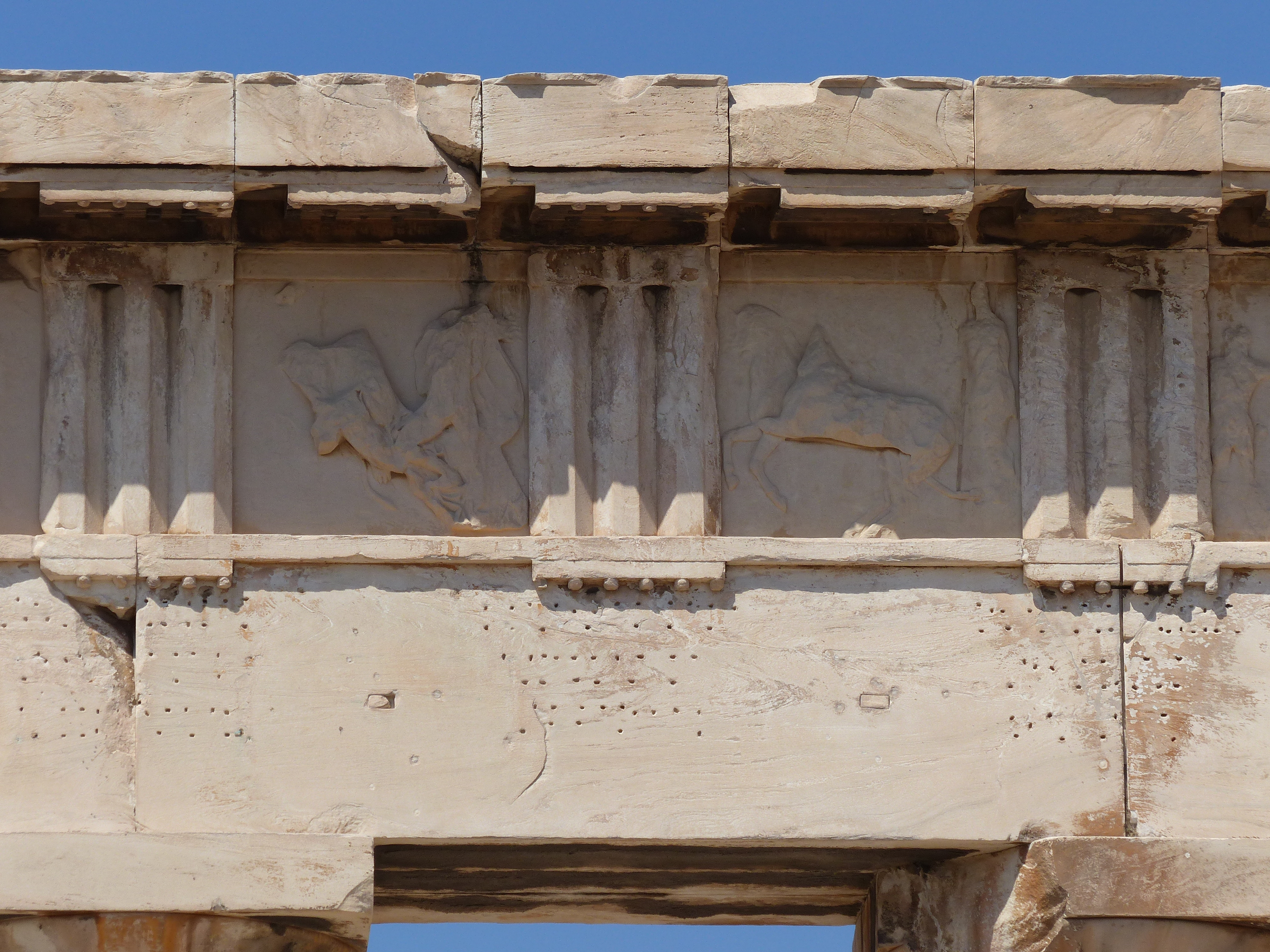
East facade of the Parthenon (detail). The peg holes for the bronze inscription in honour of Nero, installed by Novius, are visible below the metopes.

Finally, Novius served as hoplite general for the eighth time in AD 61, thus exceeding the record of Antipater of Phlya, who had served seven times under Augustus. In this year, the High Priest of Nero and Zeus Eleutherius at Plataea, Gaius Julius Spartiaticus was sent into exile and Novius assumed the role. He also organised for the erection of a bronze inscription in honour of Nero on the east facade of the Parthenon (SEG 32.251). This was the usual position for the dedication of a temple to a god, but Carrol considers it "quite improbable" that this inscription dedicated the Parthenon to Nero. He argues that it summarised an honorific decree celebrating early victories in the Roman–Parthian War of 58–63. The original decipherer of this text, Eugene P. Andrews described it as "the story of how a proud people, grown servile, did a shameful thing, and were sorry afterward." Another inscription from this year, IG II^{2} 1990, gives his title in full:

the hoplite general for the eighth time, high priest of Nero Claudius Caesar Germanicus and Zeus of Freedom (Eleutherios) of the Greeks, manager (epimelētēs) of the city for life, priest of Delian Apollo, manager of holy Delos, High Priest of the House of the Augusti (oikou tōn Sebastōn), the best of the Greeks (aristos tōn Hellēnōn), and lawgiver (nomothetēs) was Tiberius Claudius Novius of Oion

— IG II^{2} 1990

Geagan shows that the title of "manager of the city" had been created for Novius; it was subsequently held by several other individuals down to the time of Trajan. Oliver suggests that the office made Novius the supreme authority over the religious matters and properties in Athens. The titles of "manager of the city" and "lawgiver" had previously been held by Demetrius of Phalerum. The title of "best of the Greeks" should refer to a victory in the armed footrace at the Eleutheria festival at Plataea.

Novius is not attested again after this year and the references to Nero in the Theatre of Dionysus and on the Parthenon were removed when the Emperor was killed and a damnatio of his memory was declared in AD 69.

== Family ==
Novius married Damosthenia, daughter of Lyniscus, who was an Athenian citizen, but of Spartan origin. A statue base erected in her honour has been found on Delos (I Delos 1629) and her gravestone in Laconia (IG V.I 509). A gravestone for one Phileinus of Oion is the only possible record of a descendant.

Schmalz suggests that he had exhausted all his family wealth in the course of his period of prominence.

== Bibliography ==
- Byrne, Sean G. (2003). Roman citizens of Athens. Leuven: Peeters. ISBN 9042913487.
- Carroll, Kevin K. (1982). The Parthenon Inscription (PDF). Durham, NC: Greek, Roman, and Byzantine Studies.
- Geagan, Daniel J. (1979). "Tiberius Claudius Novius, the Hoplite Generalship and the Epimeleteia of the Free City of Athens". The American Journal of Philology. 100 (2): 279–287. doi:10.2307/293692. ISSN 0002-9475.
- Oliver, James H. (1973). "Imperial Commissioners in Achaia". Greek, Roman, and Byzantine Studies. 14 (4): 389–405. ISSN 2159-3159.
- Schmalz, Geoffrey C. R. (2009). Augustan and Julio-Claudian Athens : a new epigraphy and prosopography. Leiden: Brill. ISBN 978-90-04-17009-4.
