= Plataies =

Plataies Πλαταιές
- Municipal unit
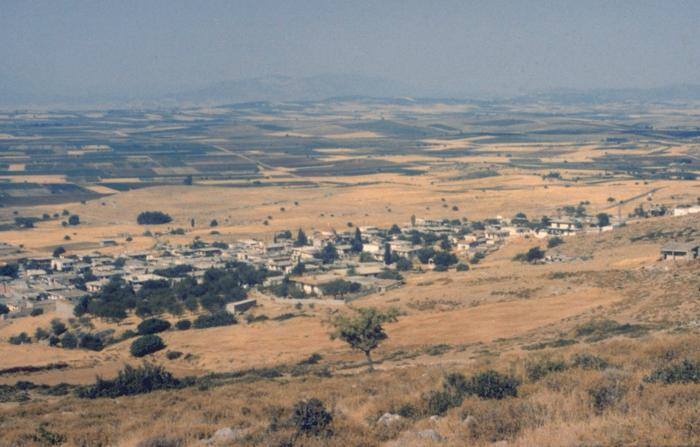
- Village of Plataies, near the ruins of old Plataea. Location of the 479 BCE Battle of Plataea.

- Location within the regional unit

- Location within Greece
- Coordinates: 38°14′N 23°13′E
- Country: Greece
- Administrative region: Central Greece
- Regional unit: Boeotia
- Municipality: Thebes

Area
  - Municipal unit: 172.533 km^{2} (66.615 sq mi)
  - Community: 37.321 km^{2} (14.410 sq mi)

Population (2021)
  - Municipal unit: 3,602
  - Municipal unit density: 20.88/km^{2} (54.07/sq mi)
  - Community: 832
  - Community density: 22.3/km^{2} (57.7/sq mi)
- Time zone: UTC+2 (EET)
  - Summer (DST): UTC+3 (EEST)
- Vehicle registration: ΒΙ

Plataies (Greek: Πλαταιές), anciently Kokhla, is a village and a former municipality in Boeotia, Greece. Since the 2011 local government reform it is part of the municipality Thebes, of which it is a municipal unit. The municipal unit has an area of 172.533 km^{2}, the community 37.321 km^{2}. Population 3,602 (2021). The seat of the former municipality was in Kaparelli.

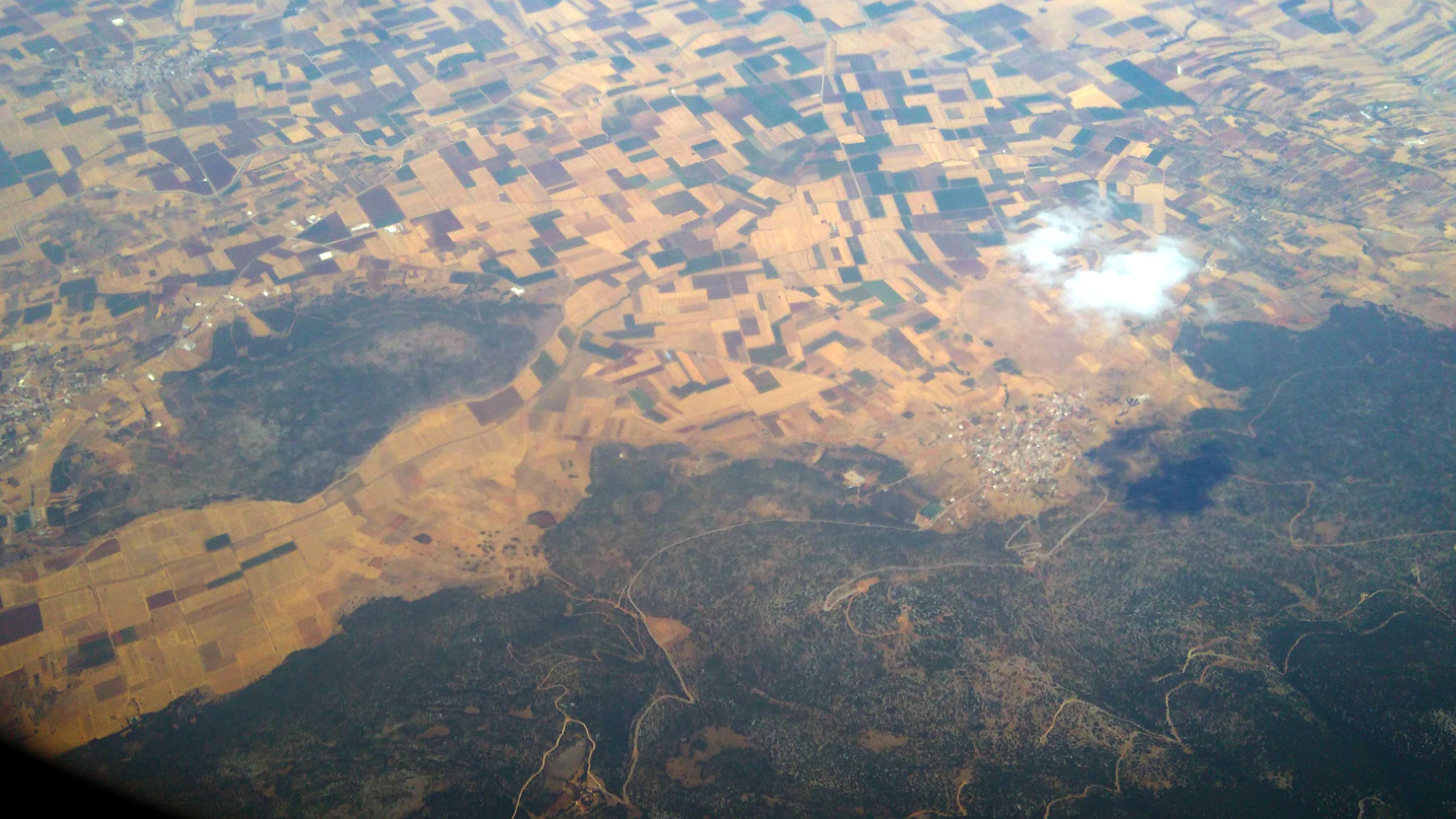
View of Plataies and surrounding area from above.

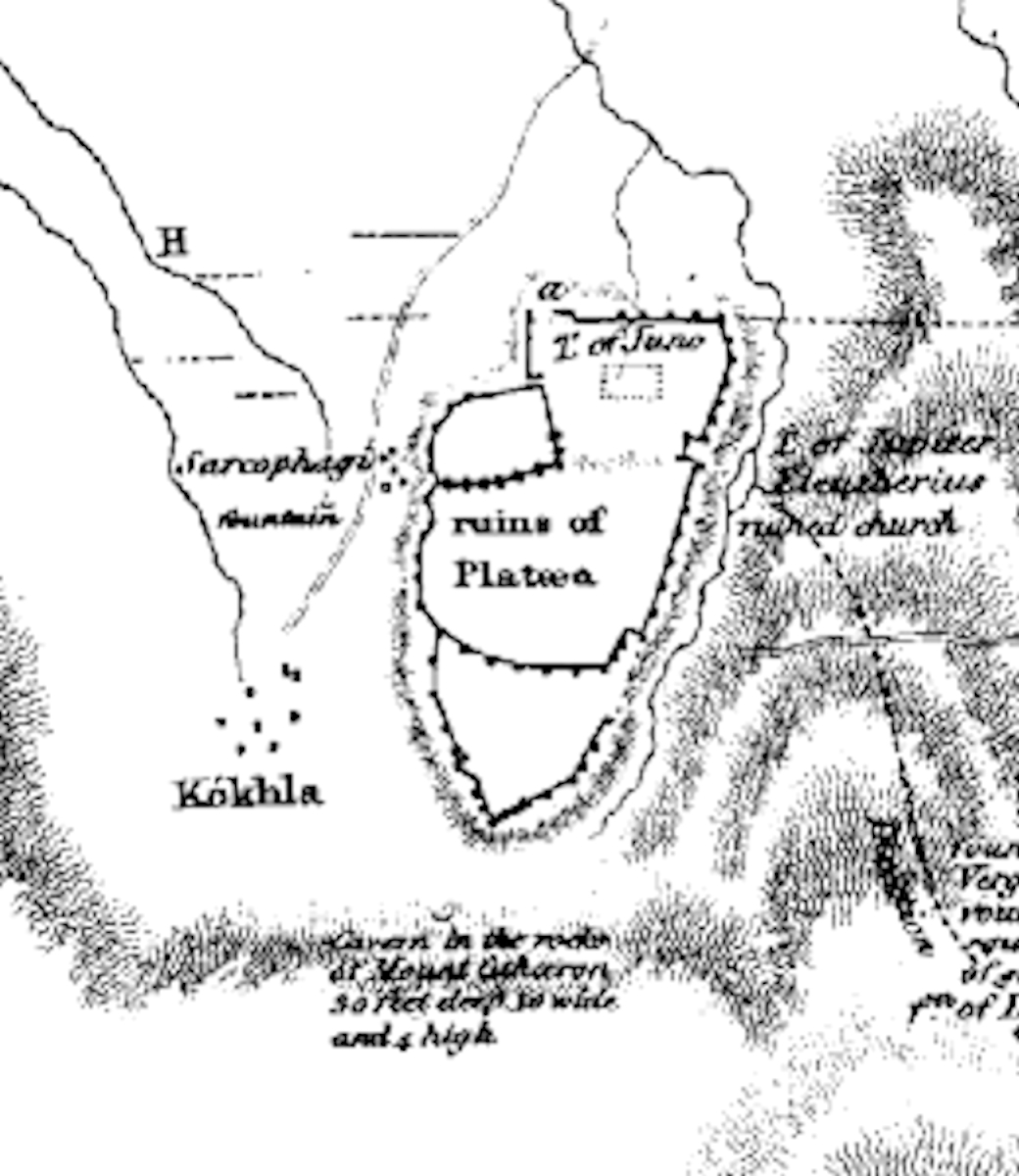
Ruins of Plataea.

The village is next to the ruins of the ancient city of Plataea and near the site of the Battle of Plataea.

== See also ==
- Plataea
- Battle of Plataea
