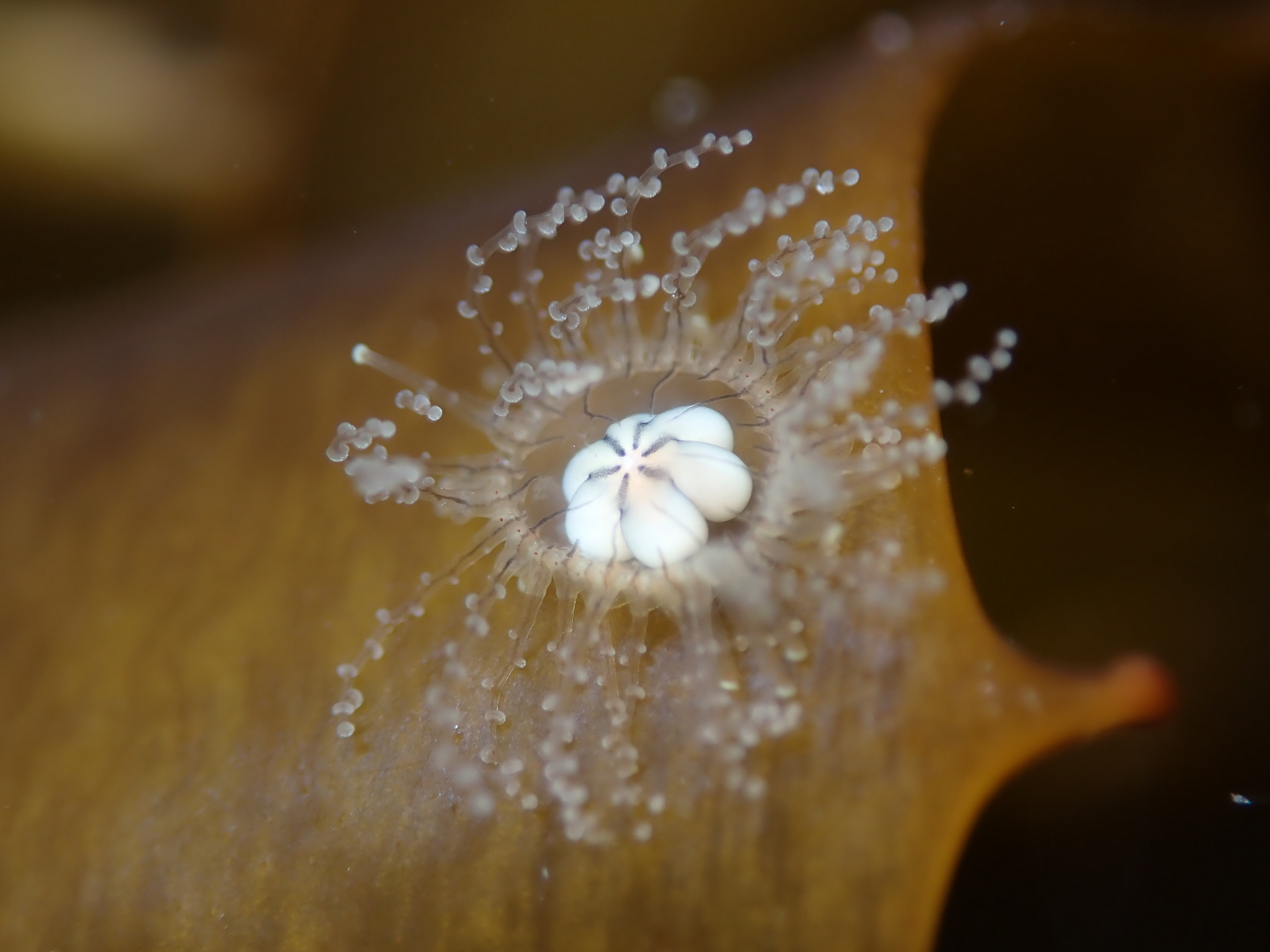
- Staurocladia wellingtoni

Scientific classification
- Kingdom: Animalia
- Phylum: Cnidaria
- Class: Hydrozoa
- Order: Anthoathecata
- Family: Cladonematidae
- Genus: Staurocladia; Hartlaub, 1917

Synonyms
- Cnidonema Gilchrist, 1919; Wandelia Bedot, 1908

= Staurocladia =

Genus of hydrozoans

Staurocladia is a genus of anthomedusan hydrozoans. Its former family Eleutheriidae is now included in the Cladonematidae.

Species include:

- Staurocladia acuminata
- Staurocladia alternata
- Staurocladia bilateralis
- Staurocladia charcoti
- Staurocladia haswelli
- Staurocladia oahuensis
- Staurocladia portmanni
- Staurocladia schizogena
- Staurocladia ulvae
- Staurocladia vallentini
- Staurocladia wellingtoni
