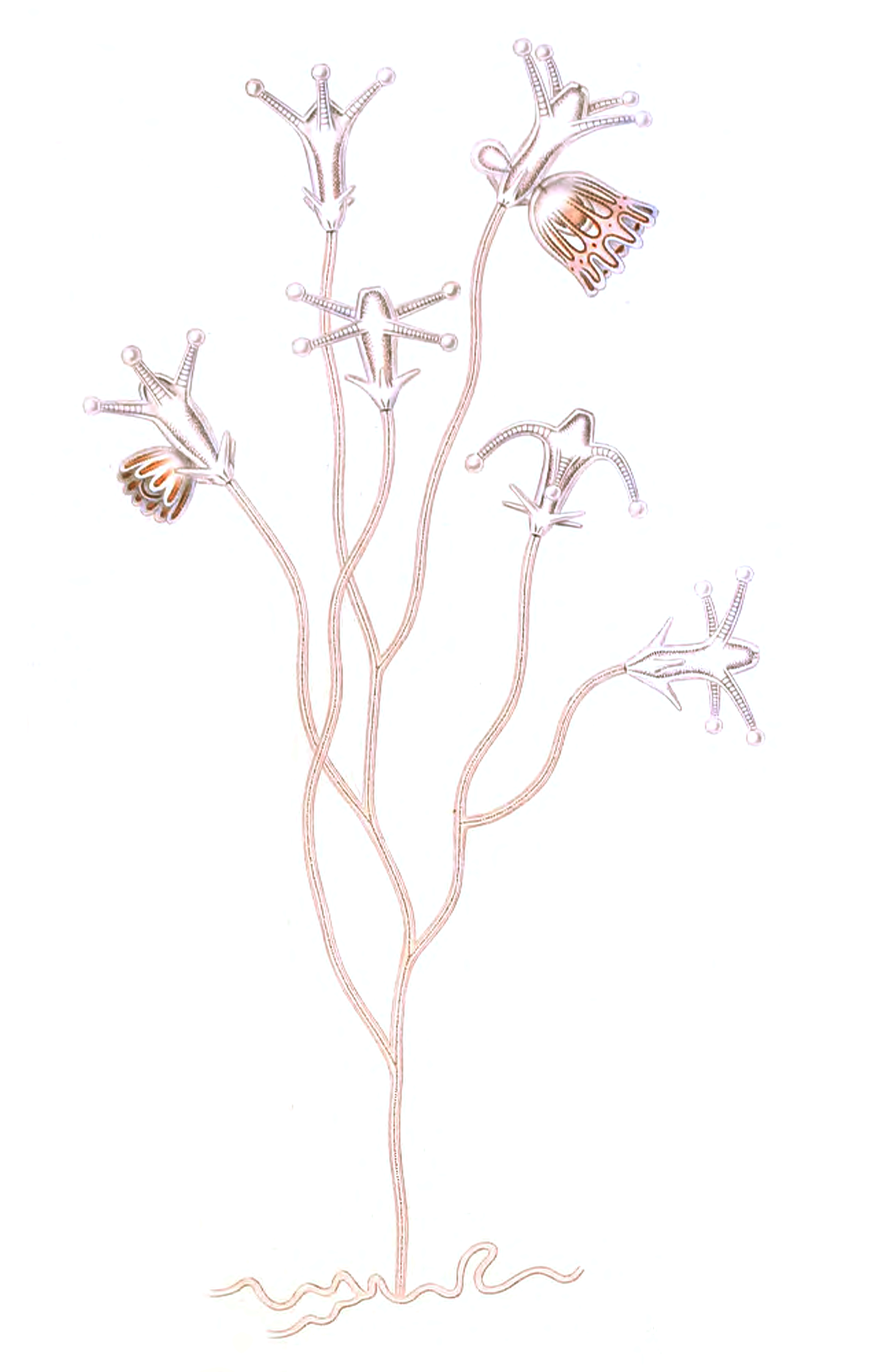
- A colony of Cladonema radiatum

Scientific classification
- Kingdom: Animalia
- Phylum: Cnidaria
- Class: Hydrozoa
- Order: Anthoathecata
- Suborder: Capitata
- Family: Cladonematidae; Gegenbaur, 1857

Diversity
- 3 genera

Synonyms
- Cladonemidae (lapsus); Eleutheriidae Russell, 1953

= Cladonematidae =

Family of hydrozoans

Cladonematidae is a small family of anthomedusan hydrozoans. They have stolonal hydroid colonies, and their medusae are benthic and can crawl across the sediment; in many species they have lost the ability to swim however.

Several members of this lineage were formerly considered a separate family Eleutheriidae.

== Description ==
The hydranths have a circular mouth surrounded by a single whorl of adhesive tentacles which each bear a little knob at the tip; in some Cladonematidae an aboral whorl of thread-like unknobbed tentacles is also present. They have a preoral chamber formed by epidermal gland cells.

The medusae bud off at the base of the hydrants, though where aboral tentacle are present these are located between the stolons and the budding sites. Cladonematidae medusae have a various extend of nematocysts around their umbrellar margin, varying between a continuous dense ring to none at all among the species. The number of radial canals and whether they are branched or not is variable in this family. Their marginal is branched, with nematocyst clusters on the upper and adhesive organs on the lower branches. The manubrium is cylindrical and in some has perradial pouches and/or above it a dorsal brood pouch; the gonads either surround the manubrium entirely or are carried on manubrial extrusions or (if present) the brood pouch. The mouth is bordered either with clusters of nematocysts, or with short lips of tissue, or fringed with branching tentacles. The tentacle bases abaxially bear ocelli.

== Genera ==
There are three genera recognized:

- Cladonema Dujardin, 1843 (including Stauridia, Stauridium)
- Eleutheria Quatrefages, 1842 (including Clavatella, Herpusa)
- Staurocladia Hartlaub, 1917

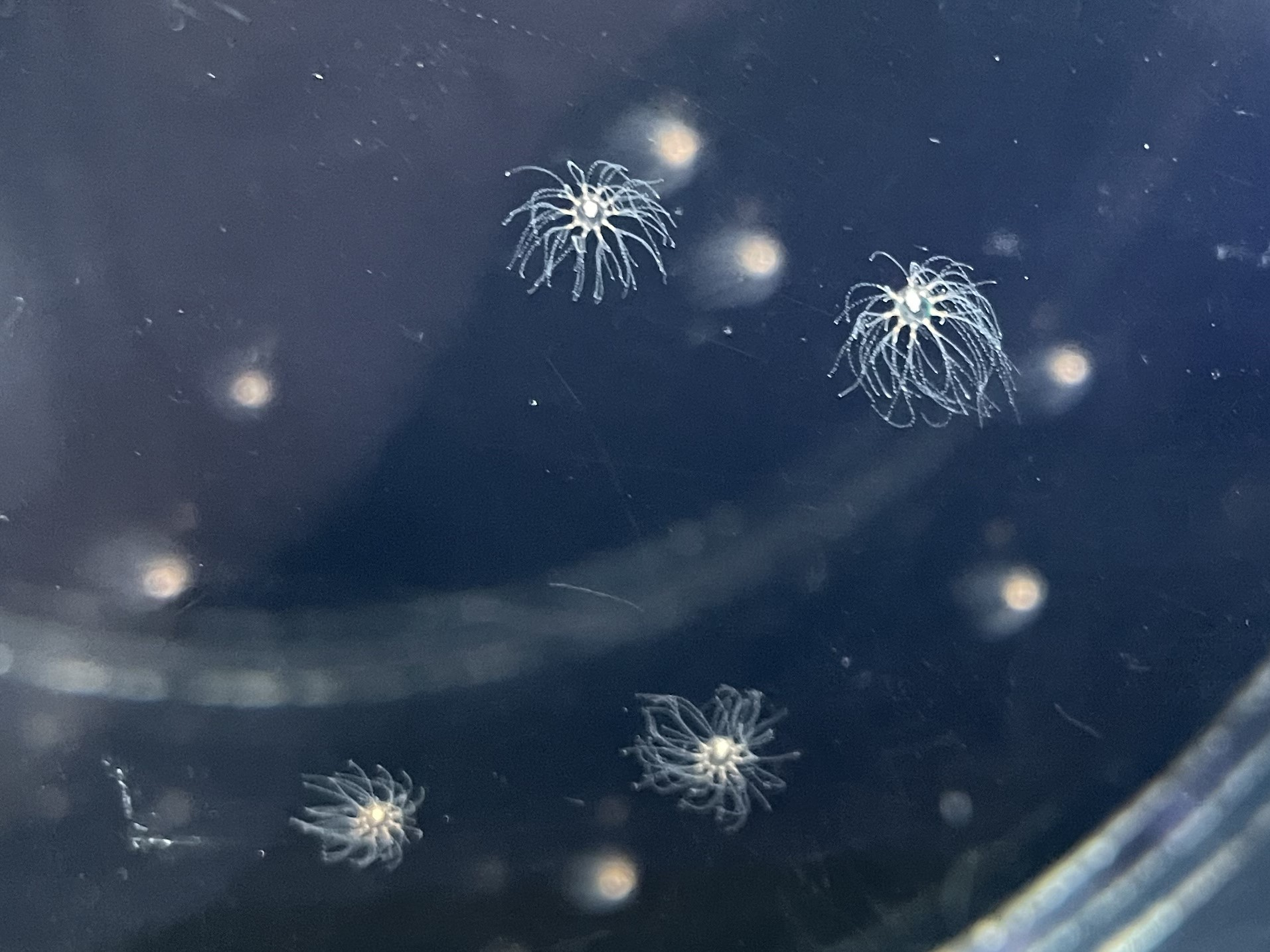
Cladonema pacificum

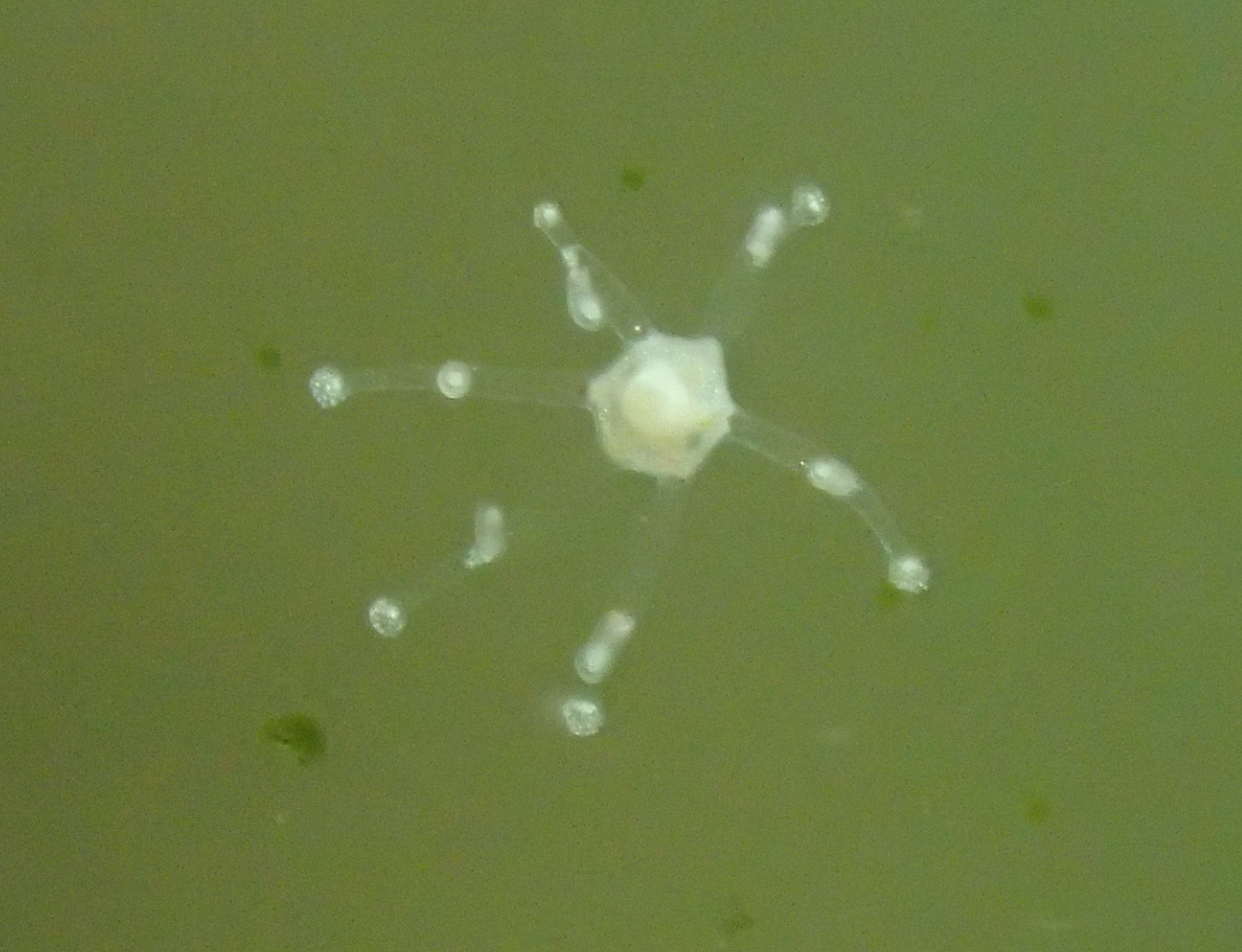
Eleutheria dichotoma

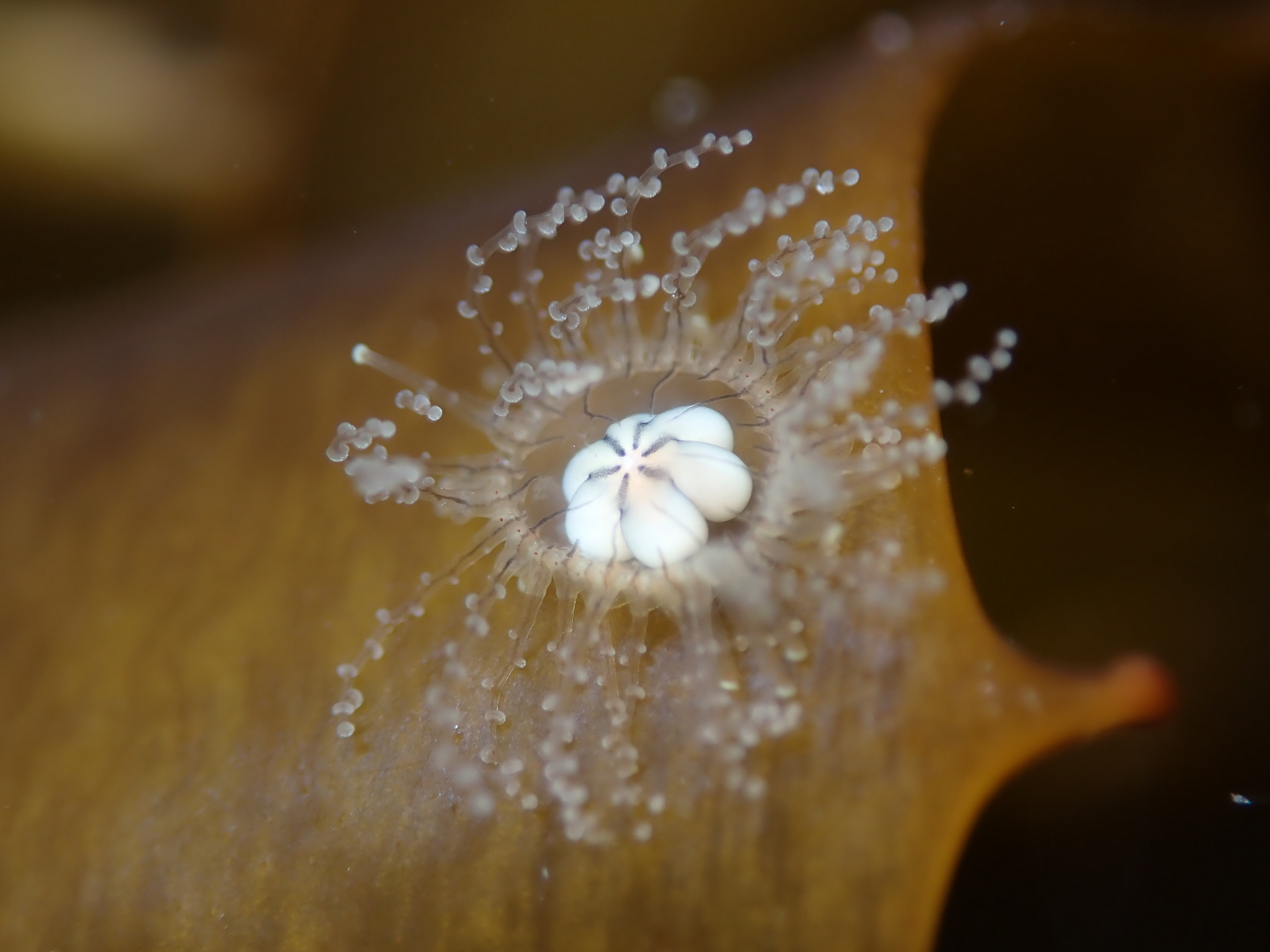
Staurocladia wellingtoni

=== Invalid genera ===
- Dendronema Haeckel, 1879 (nomen dubium)
