= Plataea =

Ancient city in southeastern Boeotia, Greece

Coordinates: 38.219992°N 23.273853°E

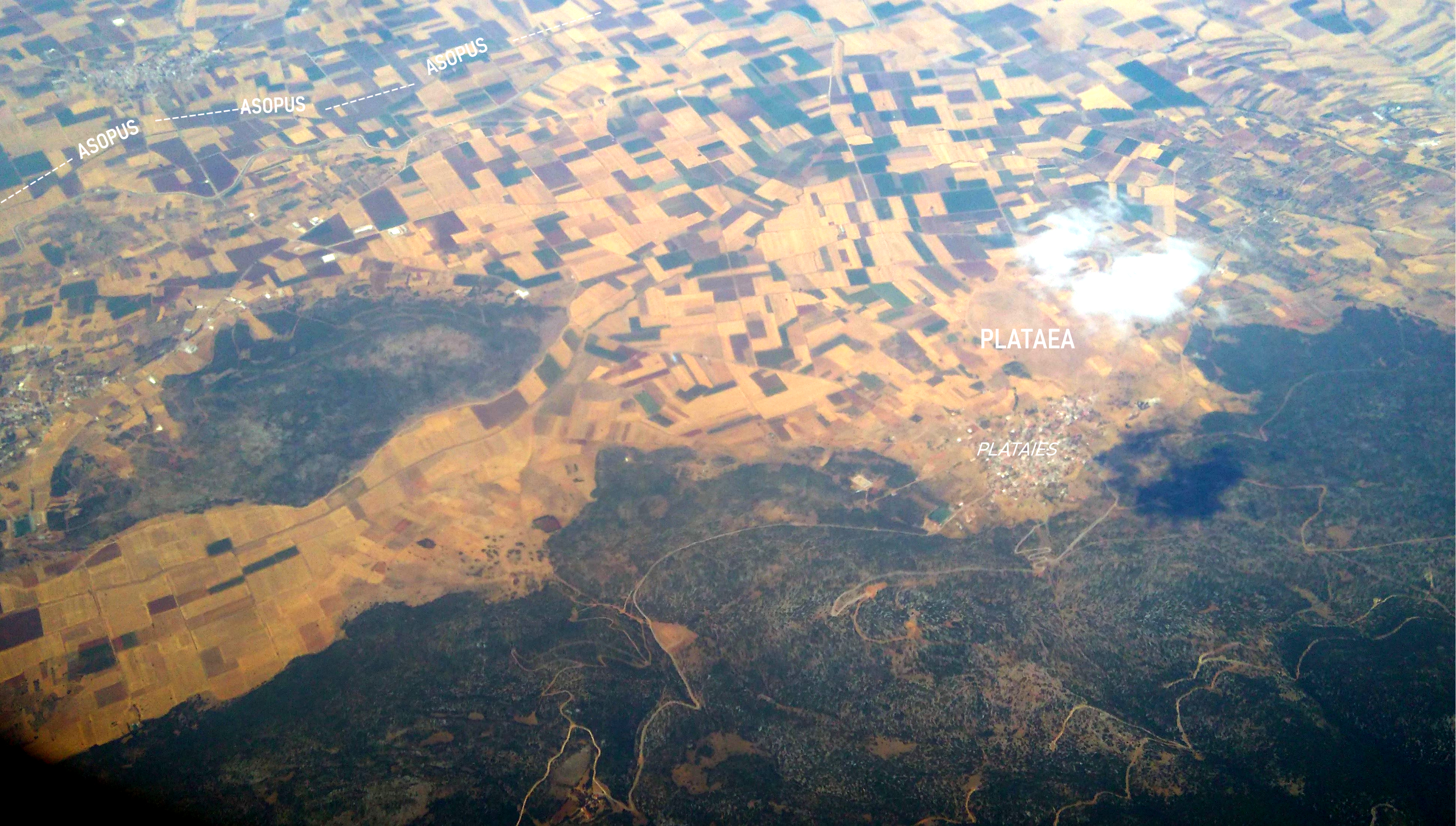
View of Plataea, and the battlefield of the Battle of Plataea

Plataies and Plataea

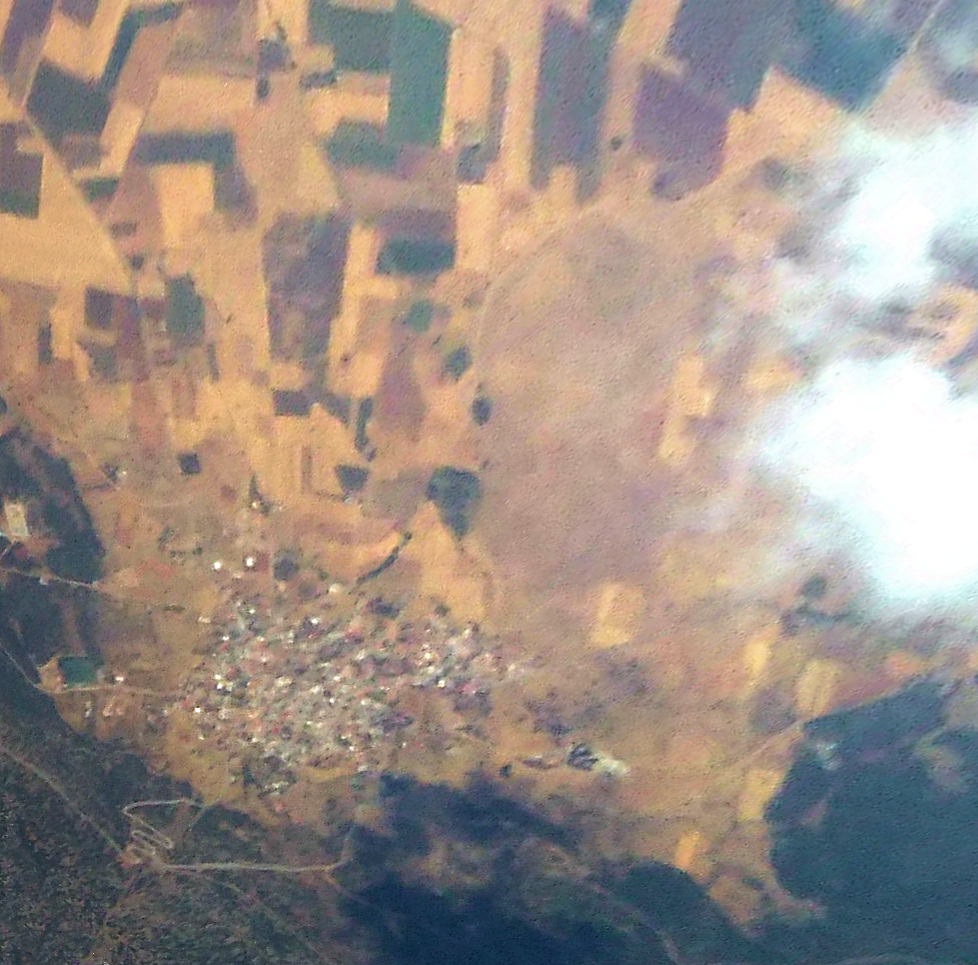
Modern Plataies and ruins of the city of Plataea

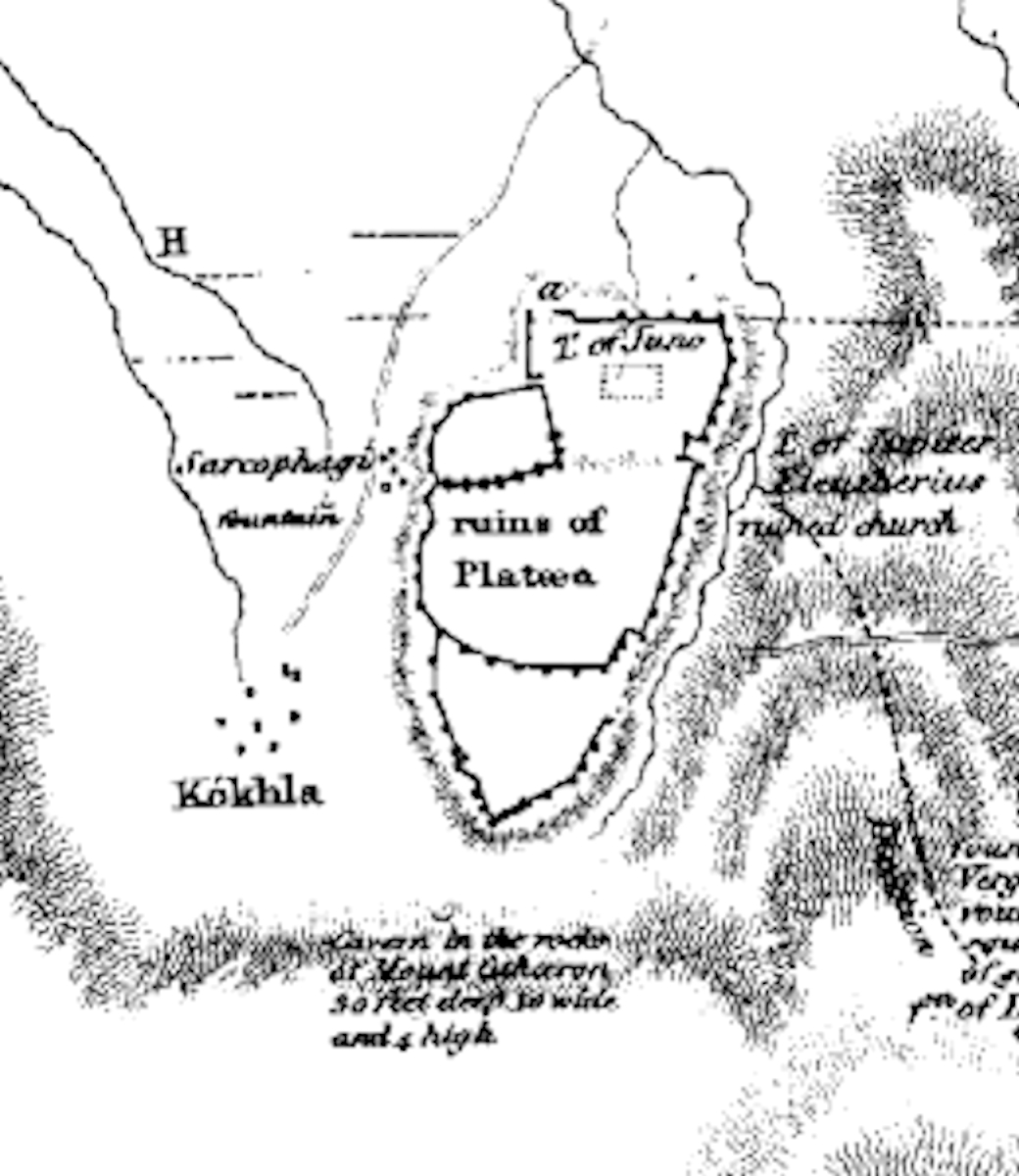
Topographical map of the ruins of Plataea

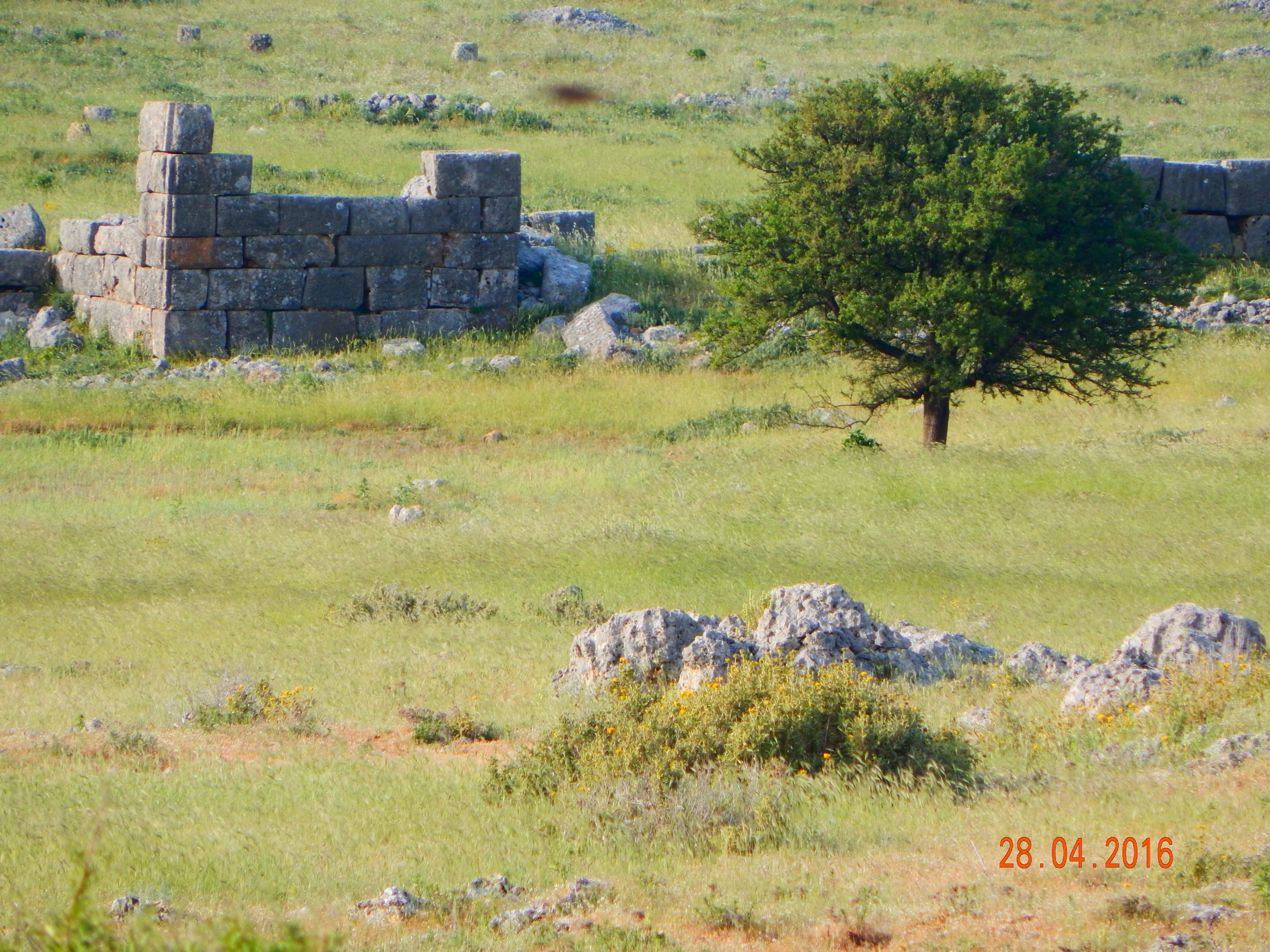
Part of the wall of Plataea

Plataea (Ancient Greek: Πλάταια) (/pləˈtiːə/) or Plataeae was an ancient Greek city-state situated in Boeotia near the frontier with Attica at the foot of Mt. Cithaeron, between the mountain and the river Asopus, which divided its territory from that of Thebes. Its inhabitants were known as the Plataeans.

It was the location of the Battle of Plataea in 479 BC, in which an alliance of Greek city-states defeated the Persians.

Plataea was destroyed and rebuilt several times during the Classical period of ancient Greece. The modern Greek town of Plataies is adjacent to its ruins.

== Early history ==
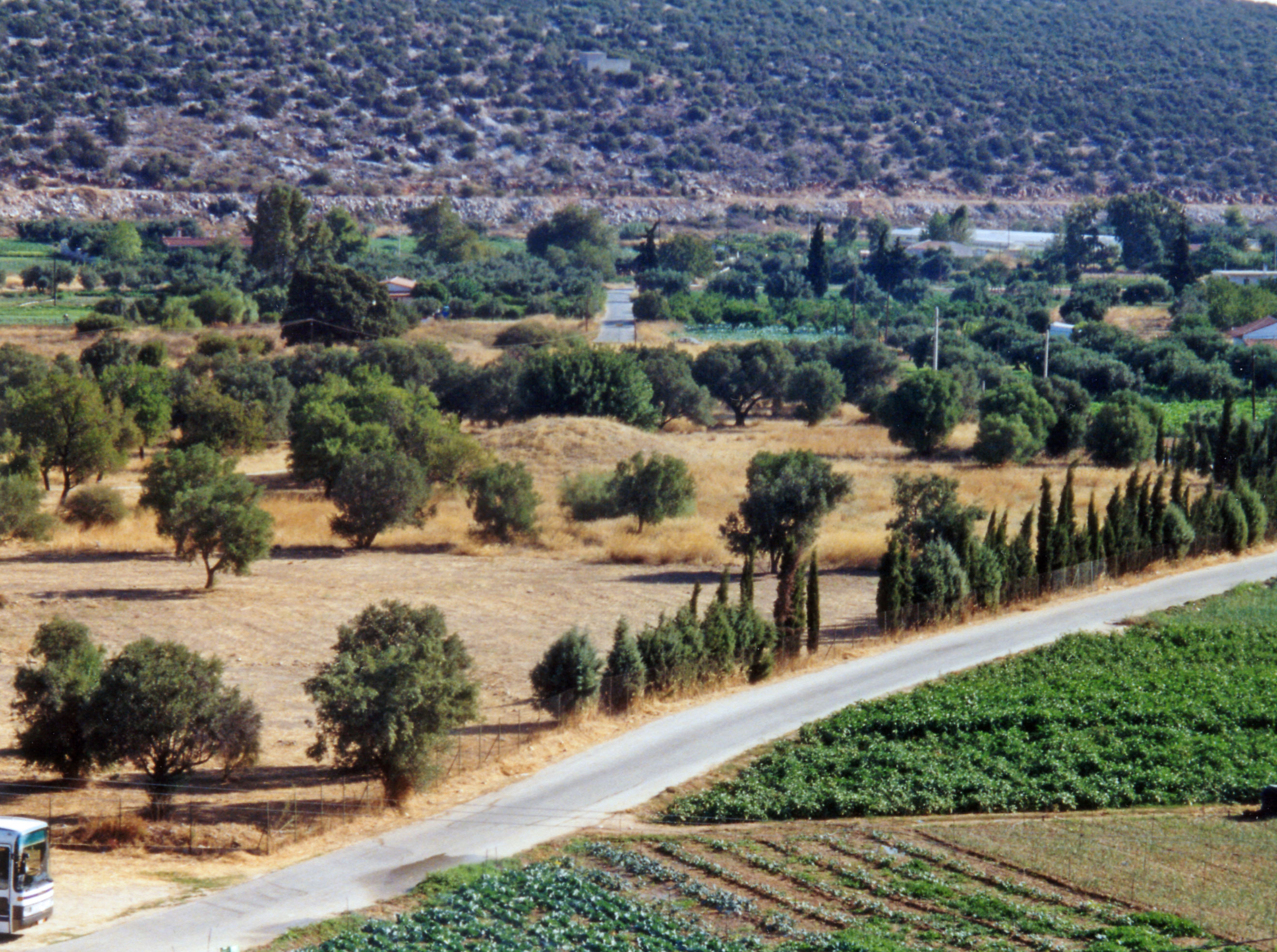
The burial mound of the Plataeans, fallen at the Battle of Marathon, Marathon

Plataea was settled during the Bronze Age. (It was mentioned in Homer in the Iliad as among the other Boeotian cities). Local tradition, as related by the geographer Pausanias, was that its people were "sprung from the soil" (autochthonous, or indigenous). Its name is that of the daughter of an ancient king, Asopus, for whom the nearby river is named. According to the ancient Thebans, who claimed authority over the city, Plataea was founded by them.

In 520 BC Plataea, unwilling to submit to the supremacy of Thebes, and unable to resist this powerful neighbour with its own resources, sought the protection of Sparta. Sparta, however, demurred, saying:

We live too far away, and our help would be cold comfort to you. You could be enslaved many times over before any of us heard about it. We advise you to put yourselves under the protection of the Athenians, since they are your neighbours and not bad men at giving help.

Herodotus, the source of this statement, went on to say that the Spartans had an ulterior motive in this: that they wished to cause trouble between Athens and Thebes. In the end, Plataea did form a close alliance with Athens, to which its people remained faithful during the whole of its subsequent history.

== Persian Wars (Battles of Marathon and Plataea) ==
When the Persian king Dareios sent an armada to invade Attica in 490 BC, Plataea sent 1,000 men to join Athens at the Battle of Marathon, and shared in the glories of that victory. A decade later, they also served in the Athenian fleet at the sea battle at Artemisium, though they had no ships of their own. They missed the later Battle of Salamis, in order to remove their families and property from the city at the approach of the Persian army. Upon the arrival of the Persians shortly afterwards their city was burned to the ground.

In the following year (479 BC), their territory was the scene of the Battle of Plataea, which led to the end of the Persian invasion of Greece. In this engagement, a combined Greek force met those of the Persian general Mardonius on the plain next to the Asopus River. As this victory had been gained on the soil of Plataea, its citizens received special honour and rewards from the confederated Greeks. A large sum of 80 talents granted to them, which they used to erect a temple to Athena. They were also charged with the duty of tendering religious honours every year to the tombs of the warriors who had fallen in the battle, and of celebrating every four years the festival of the Eleutheria in commemoration of the deliverance of the Greeks from the Persian yoke. The festival was sacred to Zeus Eleutherius, to whom a temple was erected at Plataea. In return for these services, the assembled Greeks swore to guarantee the independence and inviolability of the city and its territory.

== Peloponnesian War ==
Plataea was rebuilt and its inhabitants were unmolested until the commencement of the Peloponnesian War. In the spring of 431 BC, before war was formally declared, a party of 300 Thebans attempted to take over Plataea. They were admitted within the walls during the night by members of a faction partial to Thebes, but the Plataeans soon discovered the attack and engaged the invaders. During the night they killed many and captured 180. Few escaped. Word was sent to Athens of the attempted coup, and then the captives were executed. The Athenians, dismayed at the slaughter, nevertheless sent a garrison to protect the city from further attack. This event proved to be the spark that ignited the war between Athens and Sparta.

In the third year of the war (429 BC) the Peloponnesian army under the command of Spartan king Archidamus laid siege to Plataea, claiming that it had violated the protections guaranteed it after the Persian War by continuing its alliance with Athens. Before deciding whether to declare the city neutral or maintain their alliance with Athens, the Plataeans secured a truce, during which they sent their old men, women, and children to Athens together with the envoys who were to see what Athens had to say. In the end, they determined to continue the alliance, which set the stage for the assault that came next. The remaining garrison of the city consisted of only 400 citizens and 80 Athenians, and 110 women who were there to manage household affairs. Yet this small force defied the whole army of the Peloponnesians, which, after many fruitless attempts to take the city, gave up the assault and converted the siege into a blockade. They raised a circumvallation round the city consisting of two parallel walls, 16 feet apart, with a ditch on either side. Then, leaving a small force to guard the city, the invading army went home.

In the second year of the blockade (428), 212 of the besieged succeeded in scaling the walls of circumvallation during the night and safely made it to Athens. In the course of the following summer (427), those remaining in Plataea were obliged, through failure of provisions, to surrender to the Peloponnesians. After a "trial" by the Spartans, in which their arguments against the unwarranted assault on the city were shunted aside, the men of the city were put to death, the women enslaved, and all private buildings were razed to the ground by the Thebans. In time, the latter used the remnants to erect an inn and a chapel for the local precinct of Hera. The land was allocated to those Plataeans who had supported Thebes in the lead-up to the attack.

=== Relocation to Scione ===
In 423 BC, Athens and Sparta negotiated a one-year truce in the midst of the Pelopennesian War. One of the terms was that no new conquests or revolts were to take place once the truce was signed. The people of Scione, in the Chalcidice, had revolted about this time, and while Sparta claimed it was before the truce, Athens had intelligence that it took place afterward. The Athenian assembly then passed a decree "to reduce and put to death the Scionaeans". The next year they besieged the city, finally subduing it and carrying out the decree in 420. Once this was done, they gave the town to those Plataeans then living at Athens to be their new home.

At the close of the Peloponnesian War, Athens was compelled to evacuate Scione, and the Plataeans again found a hospitable welcome at Athens.

== Peace of Antalcidas (The King's Peace) ==
The exiled Plataeans continued to live at Athens until the imposition Peace of Antalcidas by the Great King of Persia (387 BC), which guaranteed the autonomy of all Greek cities. The Spartans, who were now anxious to humble the power of Thebes, took advantage of it to restore the Plataeans to their native city.

But the Plataeans did not long retain possession of their city. With Thebes ever a threat to their independence, Sparta kept a garrison there to protect it, and at the Boeotian cities of Thespiae and Orchomenus as well. In the 370s, Athens and Thebes went to war against Sparta, and the Lacedaemonians used Thespiae and Plataea as staging areas for a series of incursions into Boeotia to ravage the Theban countryside. After several years of this, the Thebans, sometimes with Athenian help, began to get the upper hand in these encounters. In 375 BC Sparta was too busy with other campaigns to send forces to the area and Thebes took the opportunity to compel these cities back into the Boeotian Federation. Though not under assault, the Plataeans had lost their independence once more.

Over the next couple of years, the Plataeans increasingly resented Thebes' heavy hand. At some point – the year is reported variously as 373, 372, and 371 BC by ancient sources – they reached out to Athens in an attempt to restore the long-standing alliance between the two cities. This, of course, incensed the Thebans and they attacked the Plataea before Athens could respond.

Unlike the attack in 427 BC, this time the Thebans expelled the Plataeans rather than killing them - sending them once again to Athens, after which they razed the city. They next did the same to neighbouring Thespiae. (The wrongs done to the Plataeans by Thebes were set forth in a speech of Isocrates, entitled Plataicus, which was probably delivered at this time by a Plataean speaker before the Assembly at Athens. At any rate, it was later published and preserved among Isocrates works.) As a result of these actions, Athens backed out of its alliance with Thebes and sought peace with Sparta.

In 371 BC, Sparta lost a major battle to Thebes at Leuktra, in Boeotia. For the next two decades Thebes reigned supreme in Greece, until the rise of Macedon and the campaign of Philip II to extend its hegemony throughout the region. During this time, the Plataeans remained in exile at Athens.

== Battle of Chaeroneia ==
In 338 BC the simmering war between Athens and Macedon came to a head when Philip brought his army into southern Greece. At the last minute Thebes, which had been in league with Macedon for years, switched sides and fought with Athens against him and his son Alexander at Chaeroneia, in northern Boeotia. The result was a resounding victory for Macedon. Among the settlements later imposed by Philip on the Greek cities, the Plataeans were restored to their city once more.

In 335 BC, Thebes revolted against Alexander, who had succeeded his father the previous year. In response, Alexander destroyed the city, sending the Theban survivors into slavery. With their would-be overlords out of the picture, the Plataeans were finally free.

== Later years ==
After its restoration by Philip, Plataea continued to be inhabited for several centuries. It was visited by Pausanias in the 2nd century AD, who mentioned three temples, one of Hera, another of Athena Areia, and a third of Demeter Eleusinia. He wrote of only one temple of Hera, which he described as situated within the city and worthy of admiration because of its magnitude and the offerings with which it was adorned. This was possibly the temple built by the Thebans after the destruction of Plataea. It is probable that the old temple of Hera mentioned by Herodotus, and which he described as outside the city, was no longer repaired after the erection of the new one, and had disappeared before Pausanias' visit.

The temple of Athena Areia was built, according to Pausanias, out of a share of the spoils of Marathon; but according to Plutarch it was with the 80 talents out of the spoils of Plataea, as mentioned above. The temple was adorned with pictures by Polygnotus and Onatas, and with a statue of the goddess by the Athenian sculptor Pheidias. Of the temple of Demeter Eleusinia we have no details, but it was probably erected in consequence of the battle having been fought near a temple of Demeter Eleusinia at Argiopius. The temple of Zeus Eleutherius seems to have been reduced in the time of Pausanias to an altar and a statue. It was situated outside the city.

Plataea is featured in the 2nd-century AD Latin novel Metamorphoses (often called The Golden Ass) by Apuleius, in which it is depicted as hosting gladiatorial combat and an array of wild beasts.

Plataea's walls were restored by Justinian in the 6th century AD.

The modern village of Plataies is adjacent to the ancient ruins. Foundation stones for several of its buildings are still extant. More information can be found at https://eternalgreece.com/ancient-plataea/

== Athenian citizenship ==
There are several references to a special relationship between Plataeans and Athenians, though the exact nature of it is disputed by scholars. Thucydides had the Thebans say in a speech: "It was in defense against us, say you, that you became allies and citizens (politai) of Athens." Diodorus Siculus, in describing a later event, says: "The Plataeans with their wives and children, having fled to Athens, received equality of civic rights (isopoliteia) as a mark of favour from the Athenian people". Aristophanes, in his Frogs (693-4) has the Chorus opine, "For it is disgraceful for men who have fought one battle by sea to become Plataeans straightway and masters instead of slaves". A scholiast to this passage appended this: "Hellanicus says that the slaves who joined in the sea battle were given their freedom and were enrolled as joint-citizens (sympoliteysasthai) with the Athenians on the same terms as the Plataeans".

Perhaps the fullest explanation of their status came from Demosthenes in Against Neaera. During this oration, he had the clerk read out a previously enacted degree regarding the Plataeans that had been passed during their exile in 429 BC:

On motion of Hippocrates it is decreed that the Plataeans shall be Athenians from this day, and shall have full rights as citizens, and that they shall share in all the privileges in which the Athenians share, both civil and religious, save any priesthood or religious office which belongs to a particular family, and that they shall not be eligible to the office of the nine archons but their descendants shall be. And the Plataeans shall be distributed among the demes and the tribes; and after they have been so distributed, it shall no longer be lawful for any Plataean to become an Athenian, unless he wins the gift from the people of Athens.

If this is a true representation of the decree (and its wording has been challenged in modern times), it would seem that the status did not apply to all Plataeans forever, but only to those individuals who were specifically honored and their children. Based on the several references to separate grants of citizenship, it is probable that these honors were bestowed multiple times over the years to succeeding generations of Plataean exiles.

== See also ==
- Greco-Persian Wars
- History of the Peloponnesian War
- List of ancient Greek cities

== General and cited references ==
- Arrian, Anabasis of Alexander.
- Fornara, Charles W., Translated Documents: Archaic Times to the End of the Peloponnesian War, Vol. 1. Cambridge: Cambridge Univ. Press, 1983.
- Herodotus, The Histories.
- Pausanias, Description of Greece.
- Procopius, De Aedificiis.
- Smith, William, ed. Dictionary of Greek and Roman Geography, in two volumes. Boston: Little, Brown & Co., 1870.
- Thucydides, History of the Peloponnesian War.
