= Thomas F. Scanlon =

American historian

Thomas F. Scanlon is an American classical historian and University of California, Riverside professor emeritus.

== Bibliography ==
- The influence of Thucydides on Sallust (1978)
- Spes frustrata: a reading of Sallust (1987)
- Eros and Greek athletics (2002)
- Sport in the Greek and Roman Worlds (2014)
