= Eleutheria (Plataea) =

Ancient Greek festival held at Plataea in honor of Zeus Eleutherius

The Eleutheria (Ancient Greek: Ἐλευθέρια, romanized: Eleuthéria, neuter plural) were an ancient Greek festival held at Plataea in honor of Zeus Eleutherius ("the Deliverer"). The Eleutheria were established after the Battle of Plataea in 479 BCE, and commemorated the Greek victory over the Achaemenid Empire.

Aristides proposed a decree that representatives from all Greek cities should assemble annually at Plataea for its celebration, and the city itself was declared sacred and inviolable so long as its citizens continued to perform the annual sacrifices instituted on behalf of the Greek states. Every five years, in addition to the annual rites, the festival included athletic games commonly called the Eleutherian Games, with victors awarded wreaths.

The festival continued into the Roman period, still being observed in the time of Plutarch.

== Sources ==
- Larcher, Pierre Henri (1844). Larcher's Notes on Herodotus.
- Peck, Harry Thurston (1897). Harper's Dictionary of Classical Literature and Antiquities.
- Scanlon, Thomas F. (2002). Eros and Greek Athletics.
- Weir, Robert (2004). Roman Delphi and its Pythian Games.
