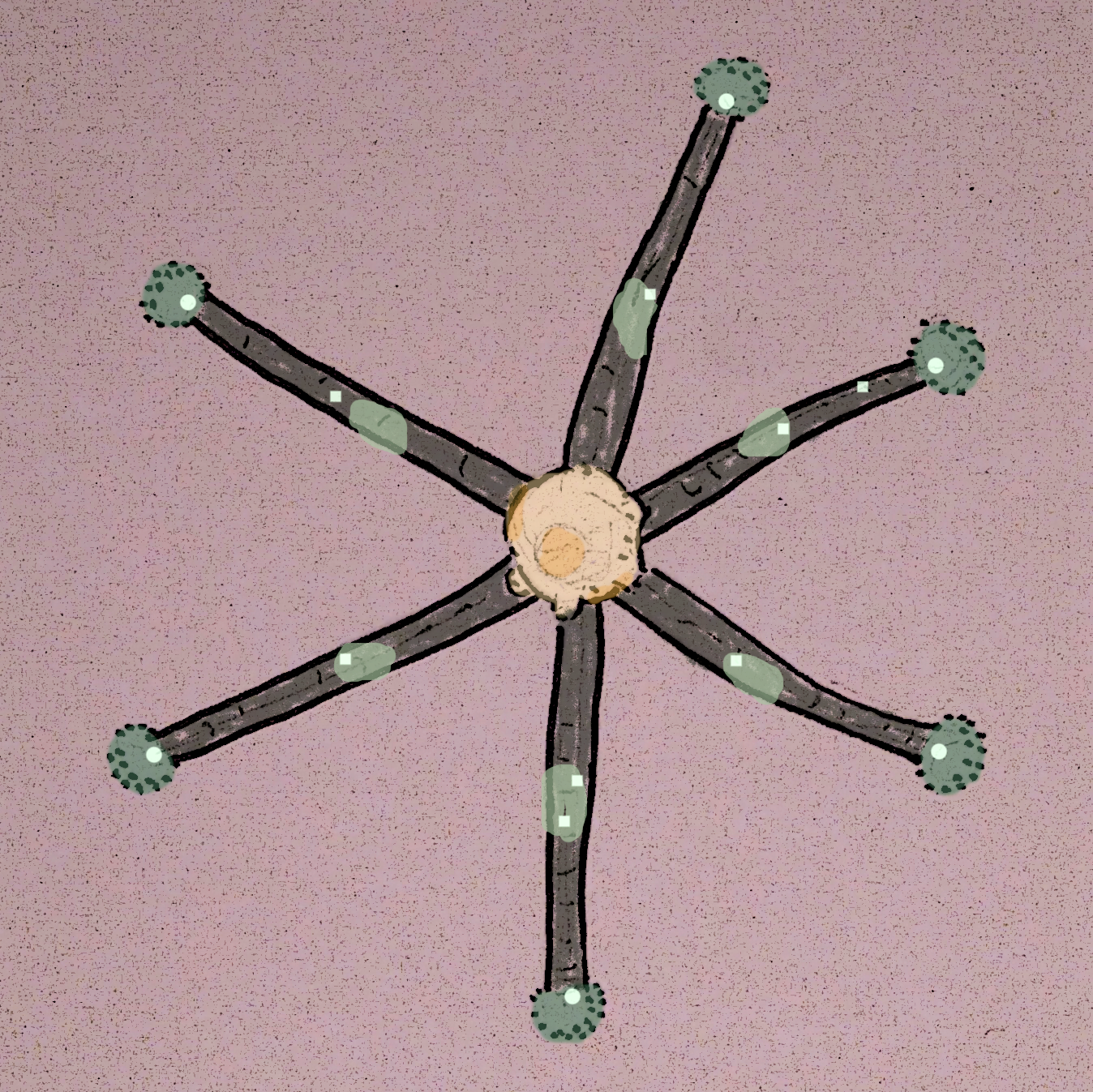
- Eleutheria dichotoma

Scientific classification
- Kingdom: Animalia
- Phylum: Cnidaria
- Class: Hydrozoa
- Order: Anthoathecata
- Family: Cladonematidae
- Genus: Eleutheria; Quatrefages, 1842

Synonyms
- Clavatella Hincks, 1861; Herpusa Schmidt, 1869

= Eleutheria (cnidarian) =

Genus of aquatic animals

Eleutheria is a genus of hydrozoans belonging to the family Cladonematidae.

The species of this genus are found in Europe and Australia.

== Species ==
There are two species recognised in the genus Eleutheria:

- Eleutheria claparedii Hartlaub, 1889
- Eleutheria dichotoma Quatrefages, 1842
