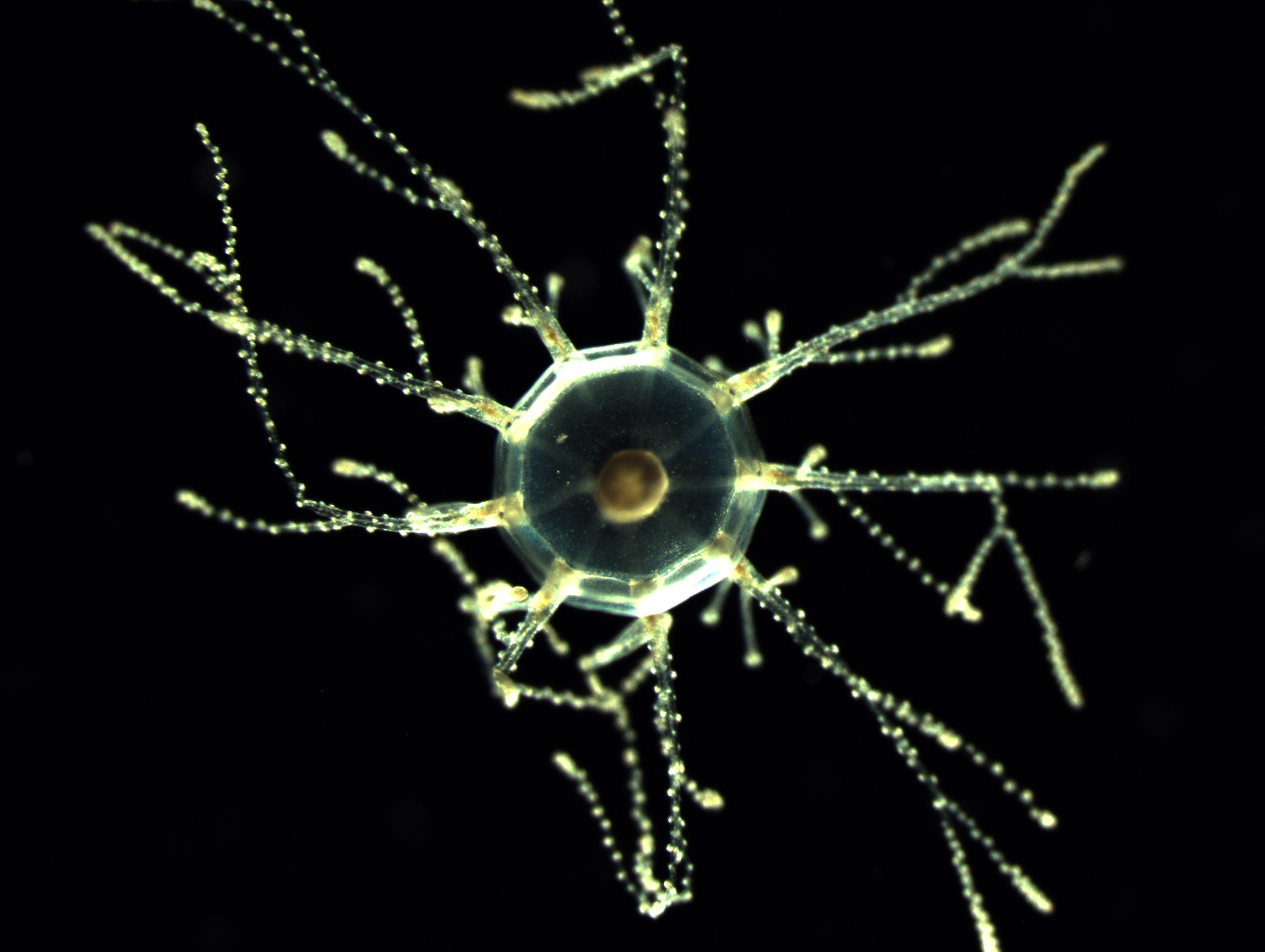

Scientific classification
- Kingdom: Animalia
- Phylum: Cnidaria
- Class: Hydrozoa
- Order: Anthoathecata
- Family: Cladonematidae
- Genus: Cladonema; Dujardin, 1843

= Cladonema (cnidarian) =

Genus of aquatic animals

Cladonema is a genus of hydrozoa belonging to the family Cladonematidae.

The genus has almost cosmopolitan distribution.

Species:

- Cladonema californicum Hyman, 1947
- Cladonema myersi Rees, 1949
- Cladonema novaezelandiae Ralph, 1953
- Cladonema pacificum Naumov, 1955
- Cladonema radiatum Dujardin, 1843
- Cladonema timmsii Gershwin & Zeidler, 2008
