= List of echinoderms of Ireland =

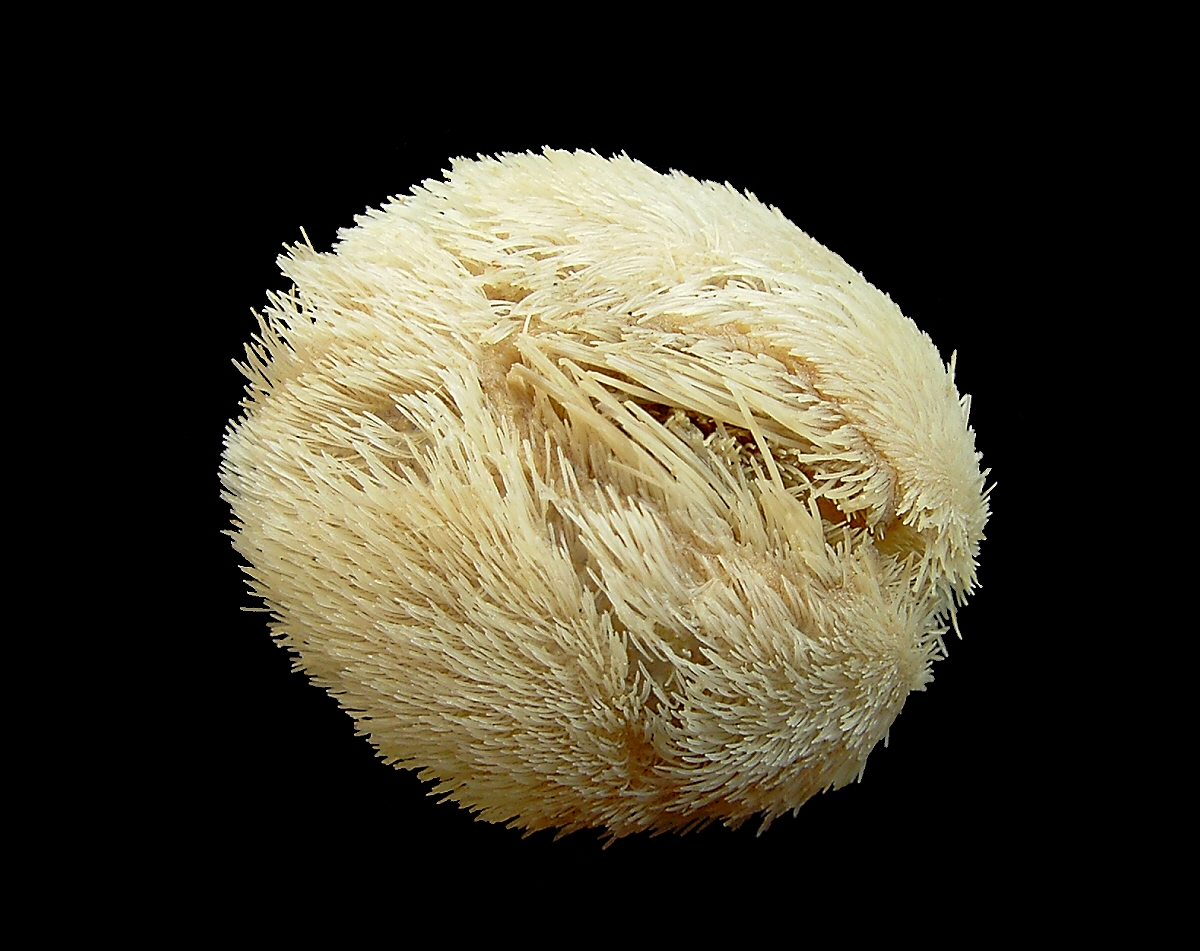
Test (hard shell) of the sea potato

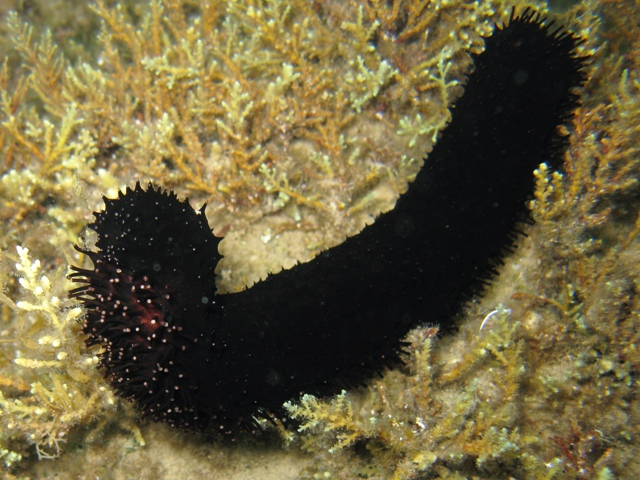
Holothuria forskali (black sea cucumber)

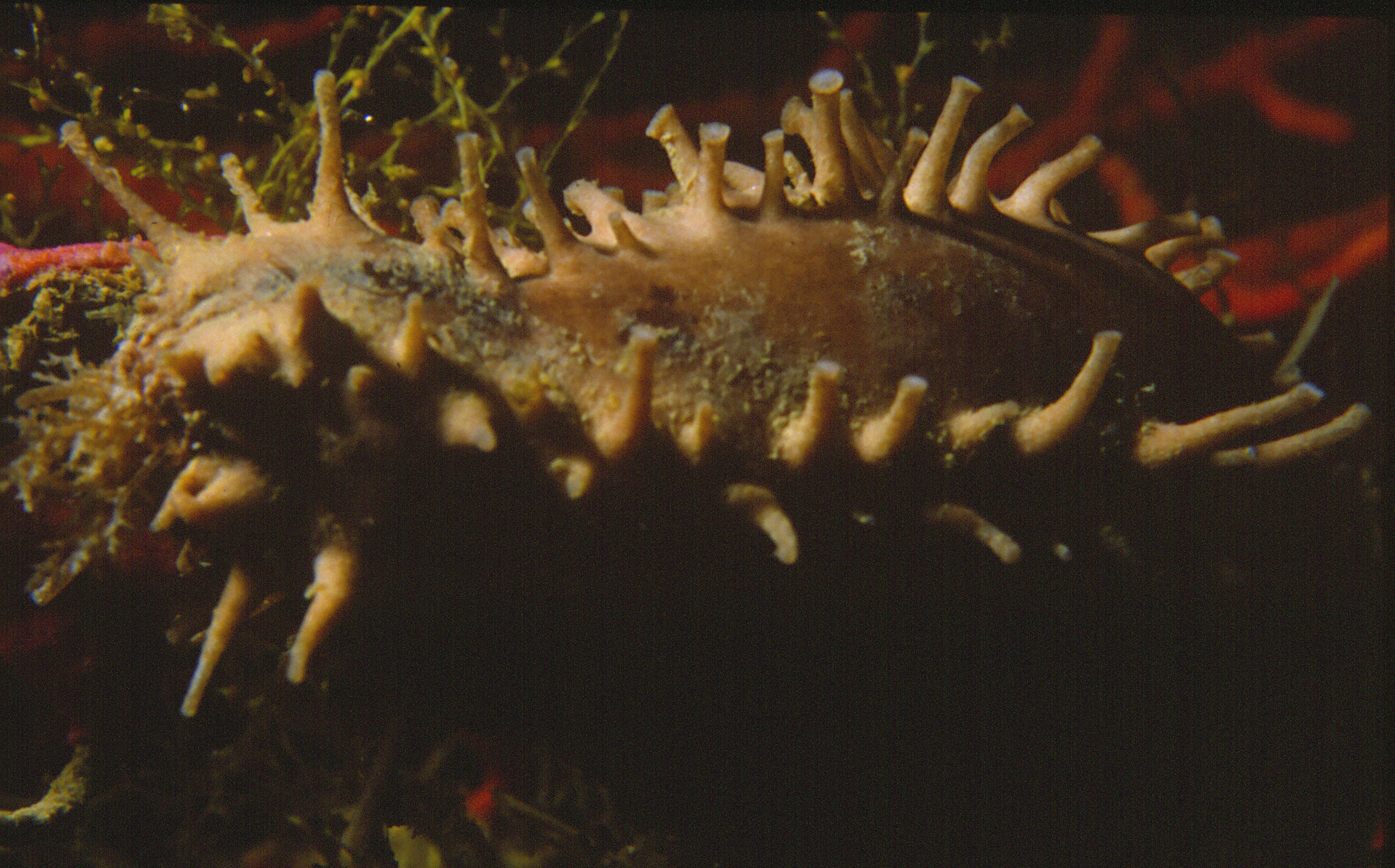
Ocnus planci, a sea cucumber

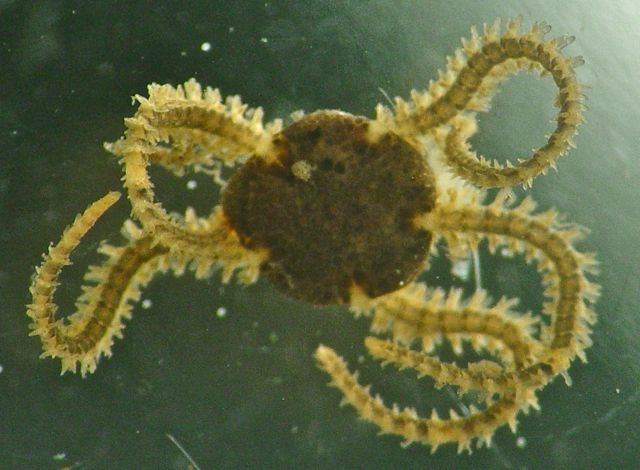
Amphipholis squamata (brooding snake star, dwarf brittle star)

There are 75 species of echinoderm (phylum Echinodermata) recorded in Ireland.

== Class Asteroidea (sea stars) ==
=== Order Forcipulatida ===
==== Family Asteriidae ====
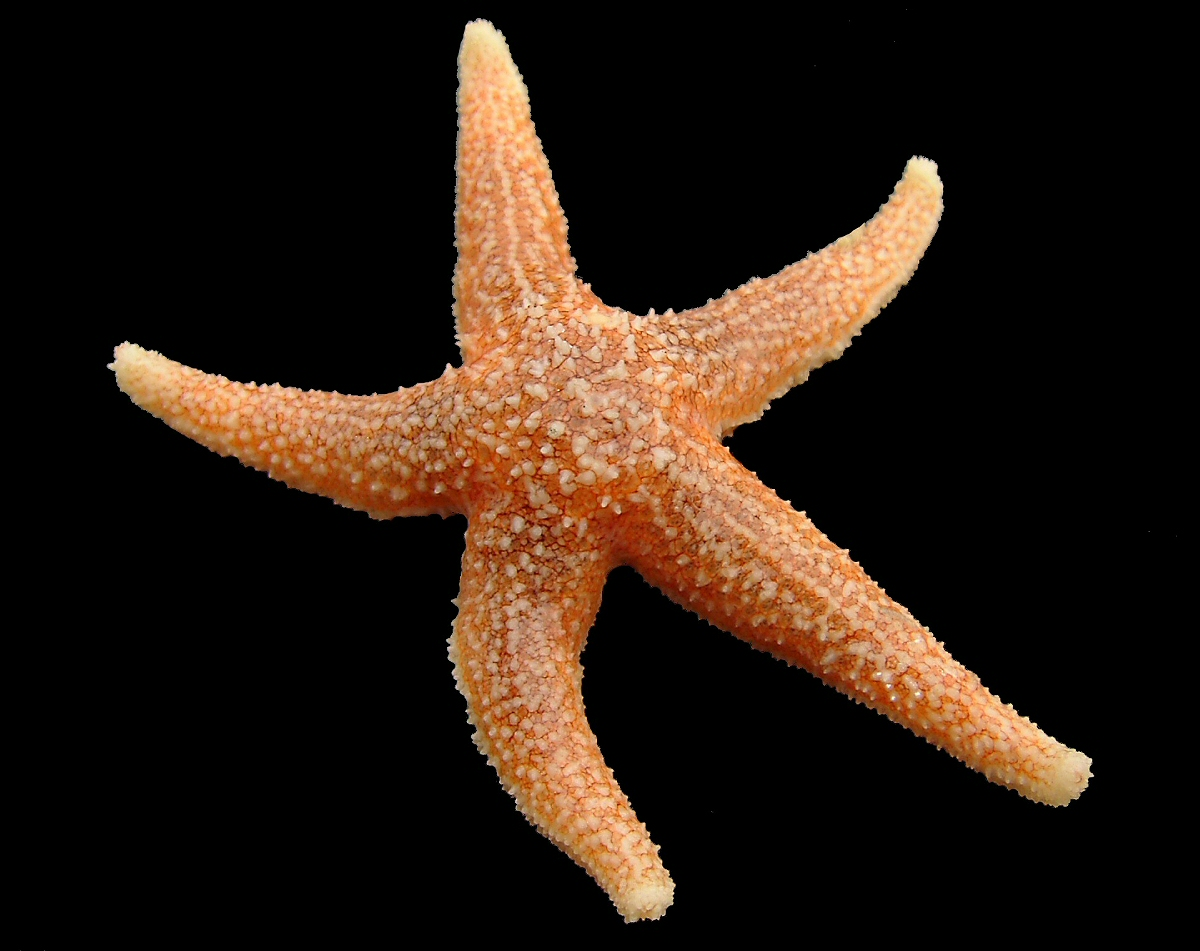
Asterias rubens, the common sea star (starfish)

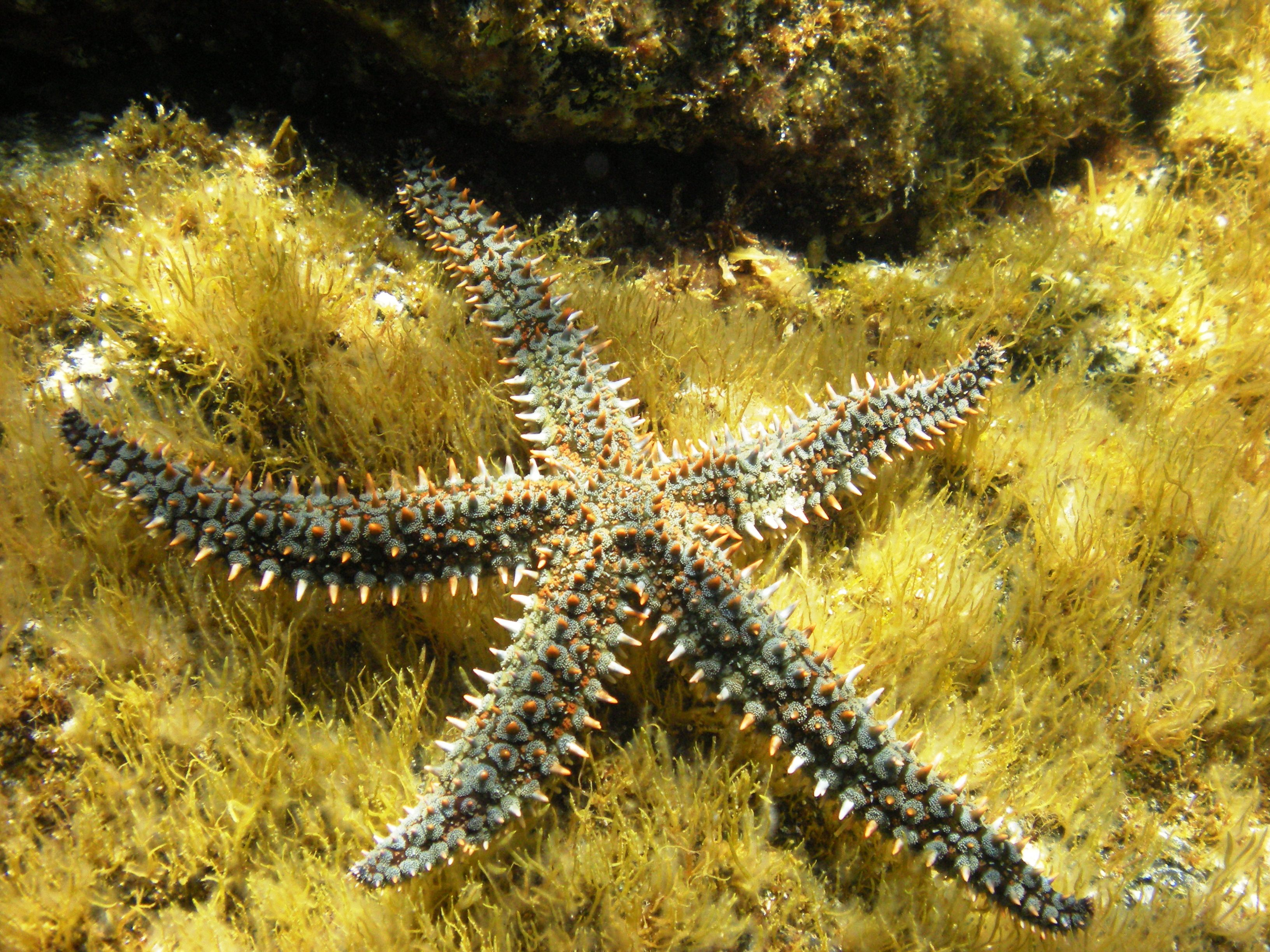
Spiny sea star

- Asterias rubens (common sea star)
- Leptasterias muelleri (northern sea star)
- Marthasterias glacialis (spiny sea star)
- Stichastrella rosea

=== Order Paxillosida ===
==== Family Astropectinidae ====
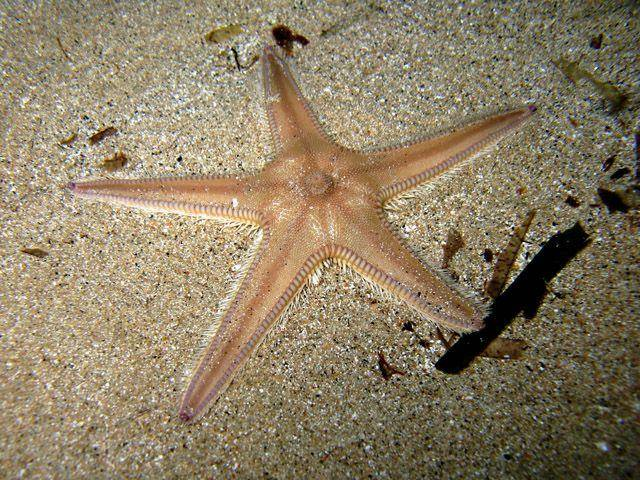
Astropecten irregularis on the seabed.

- Astropecten irregularis (sand sea star)

==== Family Luidiidae ====
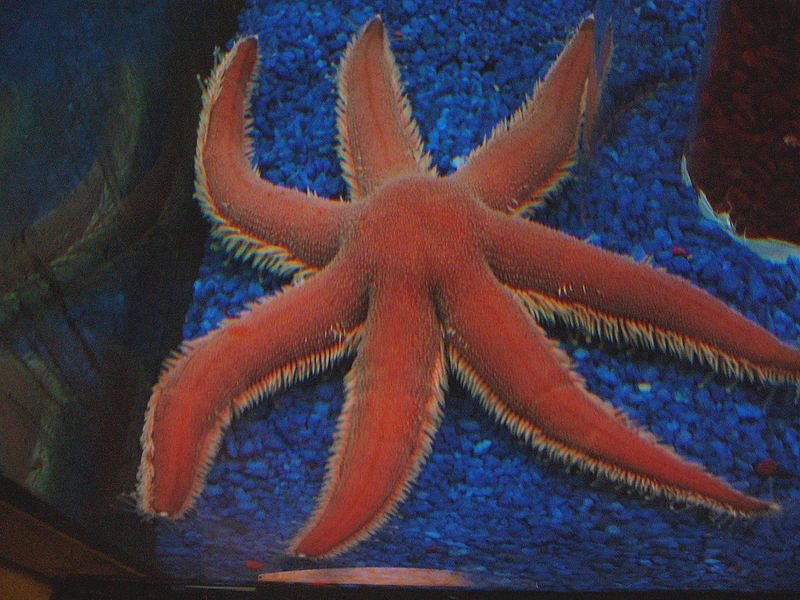
Luidia ciliaris (seven-armed sea star)

- Luidia ciliaris (seven-armed sea star)
- Luidia sarsi

=== Order Spinulosida ===
==== Family Echinasteridae ====
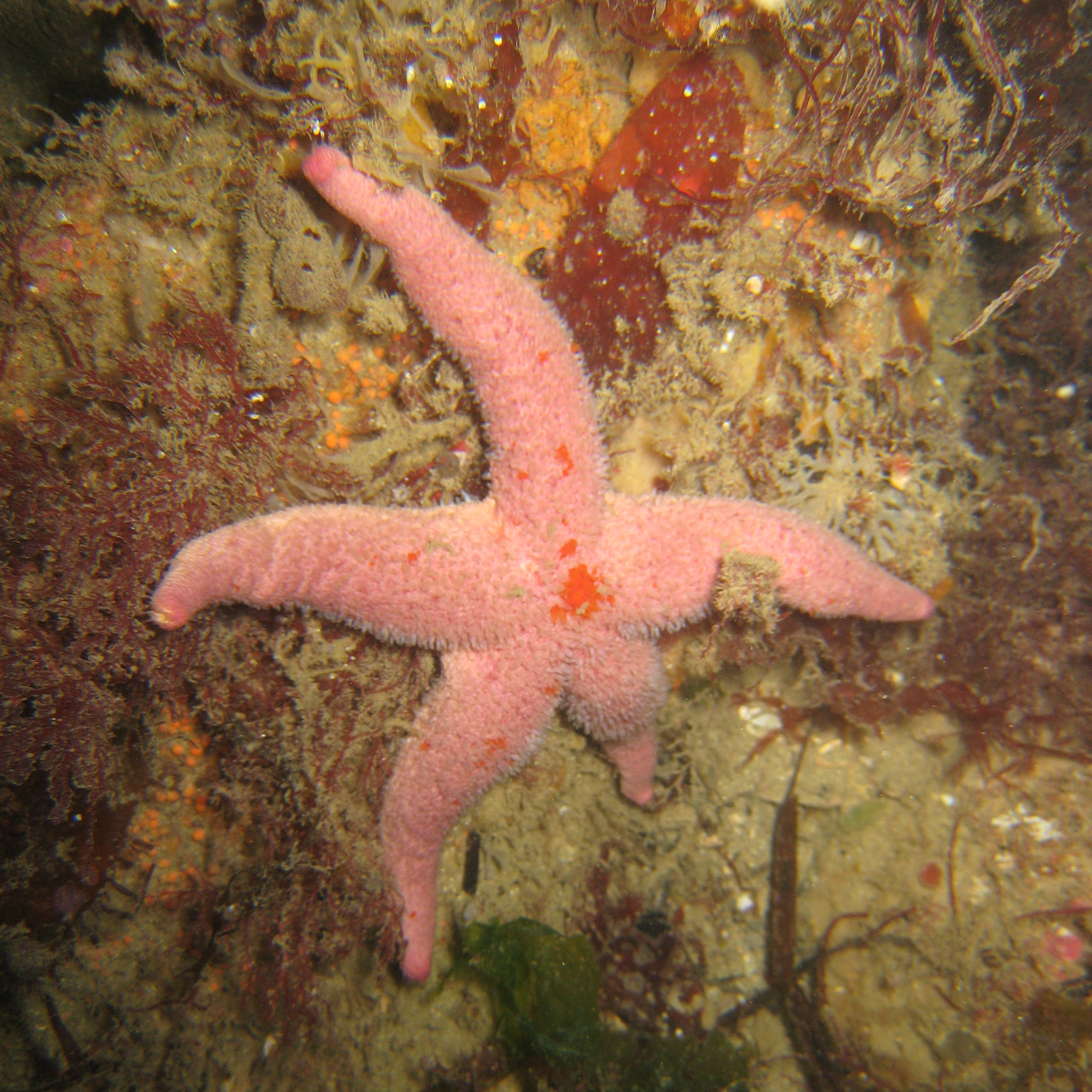
Henricia sanguinolenta (bloody henry)

- Henricia oculata (bloody Henry starfish)
- Henricia sanguinolenta (northern henricia, bloody henry)

=== Order Valvatida ===
==== Family Asterinidae ====
- Anseropoda placenta
- Asterina gibbosa (starlet cushion star)
- Asterina phylactica

==== Family Poraniidae ====
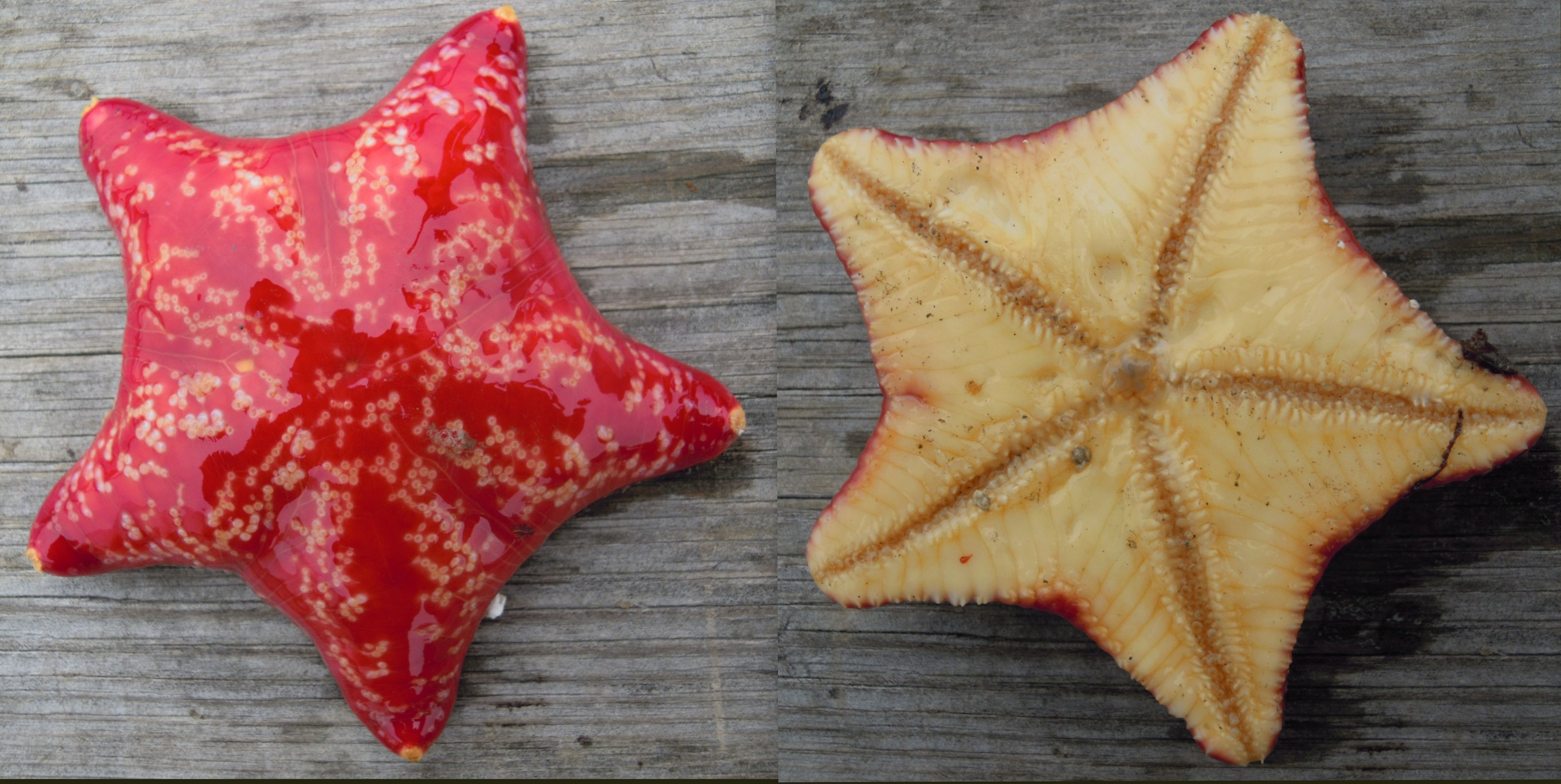
Porania pulvillus: aboral and oral ends.

- Porania pulvillus

=== Order Velatida ===
==== Family Solasteridae ====
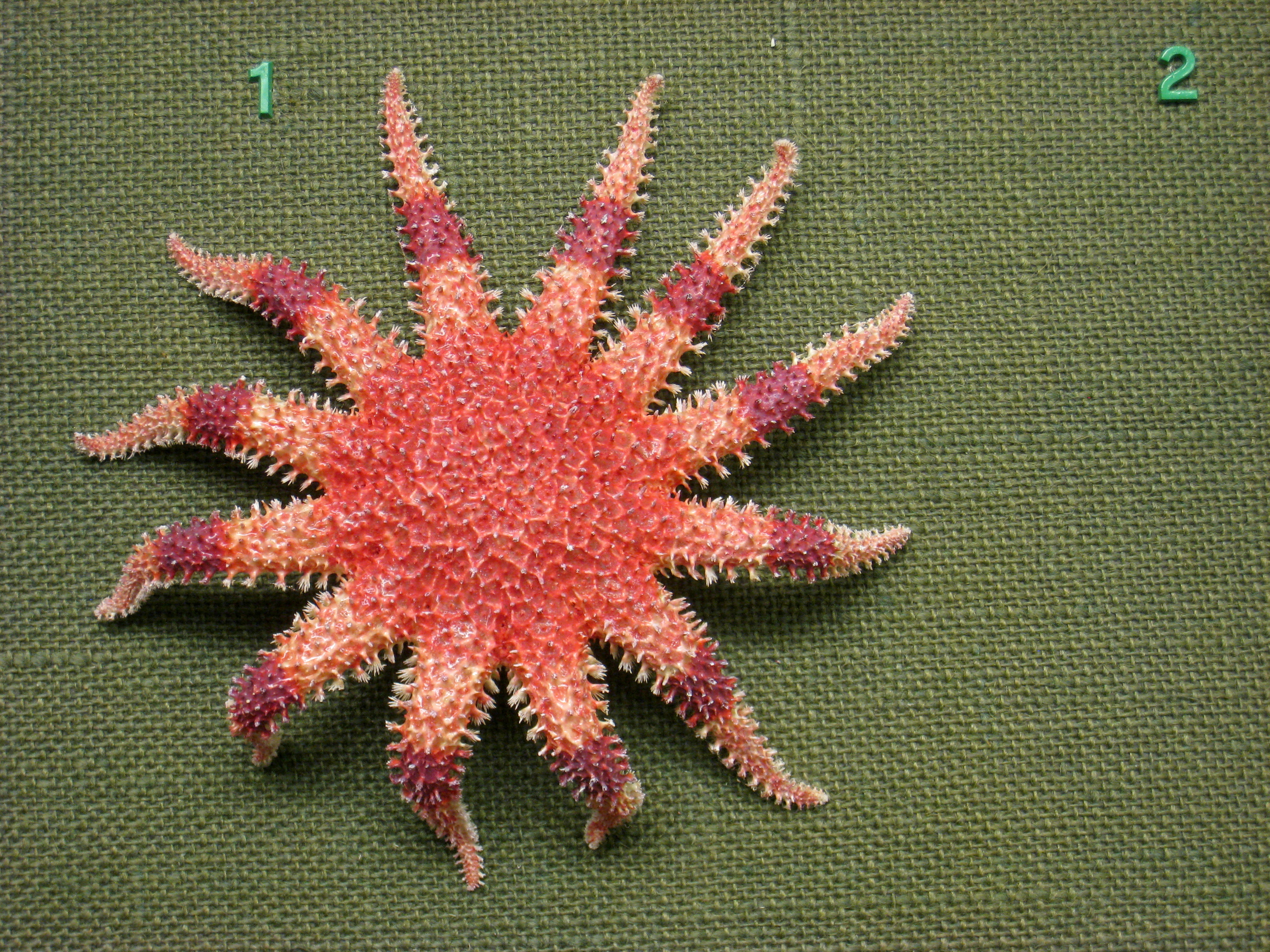
Common sunstar

- Crossaster papposus (common sunstar)
- Solaster endeca (purple sunstar, northern sunstar, smooth sun star)

== Class Crinoidea (sea lilies, feather stars) ==
=== Order Comatulida (feather stars) ===
==== Family Antedonidae ====
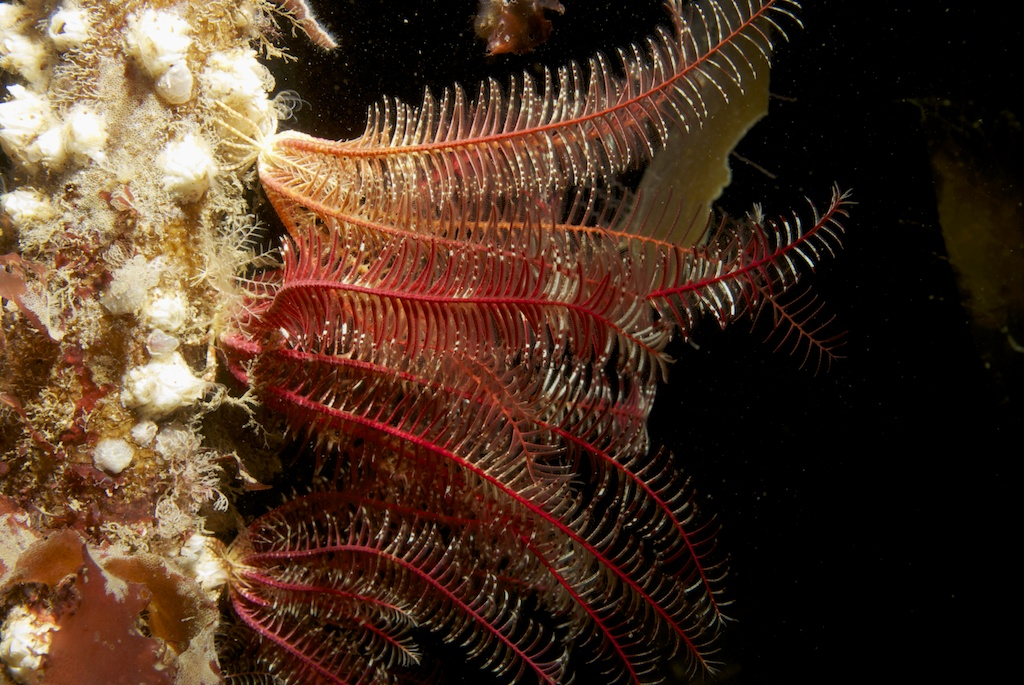
Rosy feather star (Antedon bifida)

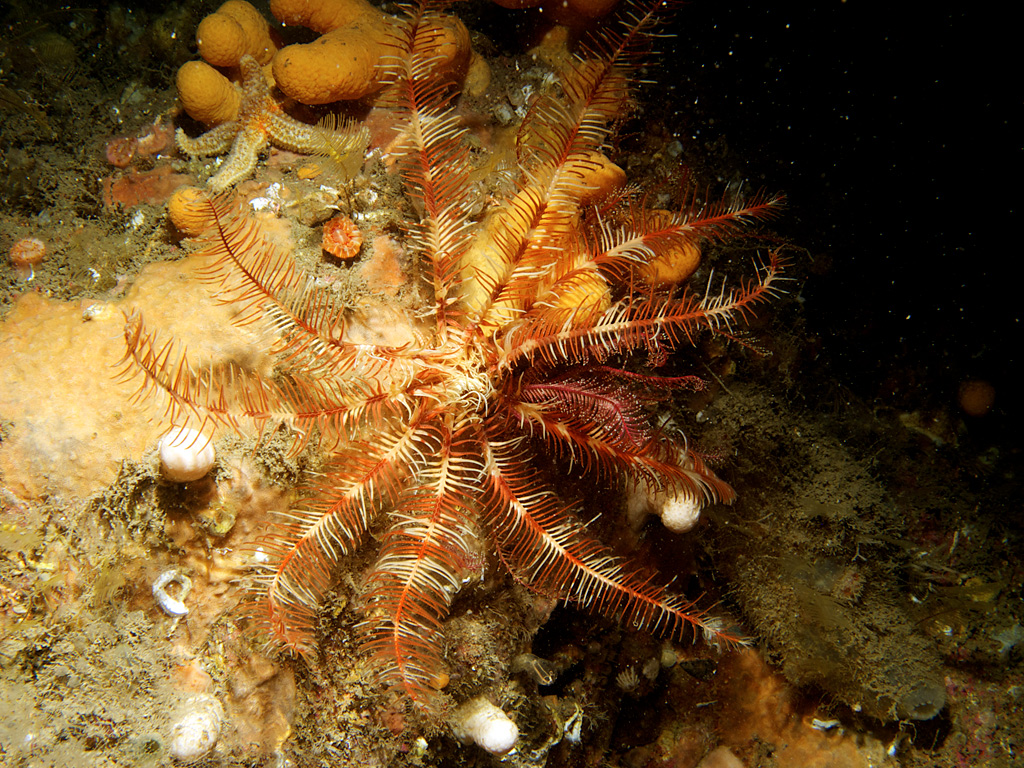
Antedon petasus, a feather star

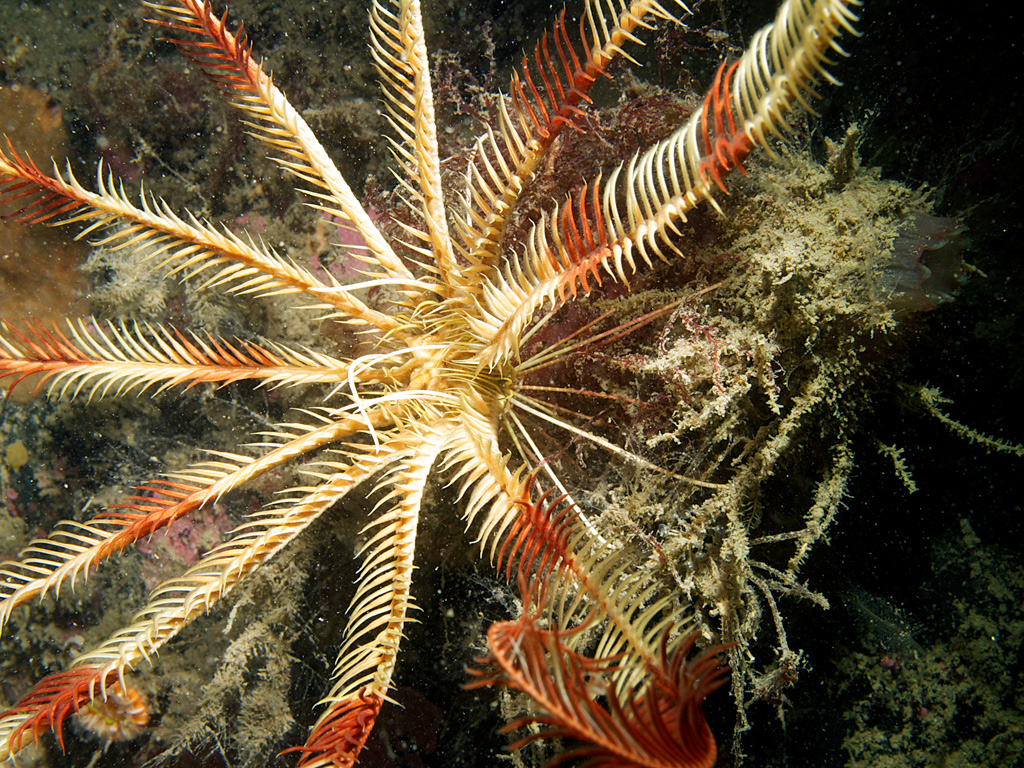
Leptometra celtica, a feather star

- Antedon bifida (rosy feather star)
- Antedon petasus
- Leptometra celtica

== Class Echinoidea (sea urchins) ==
=== Order Camarodonta ===
==== Family Parechinidae ====
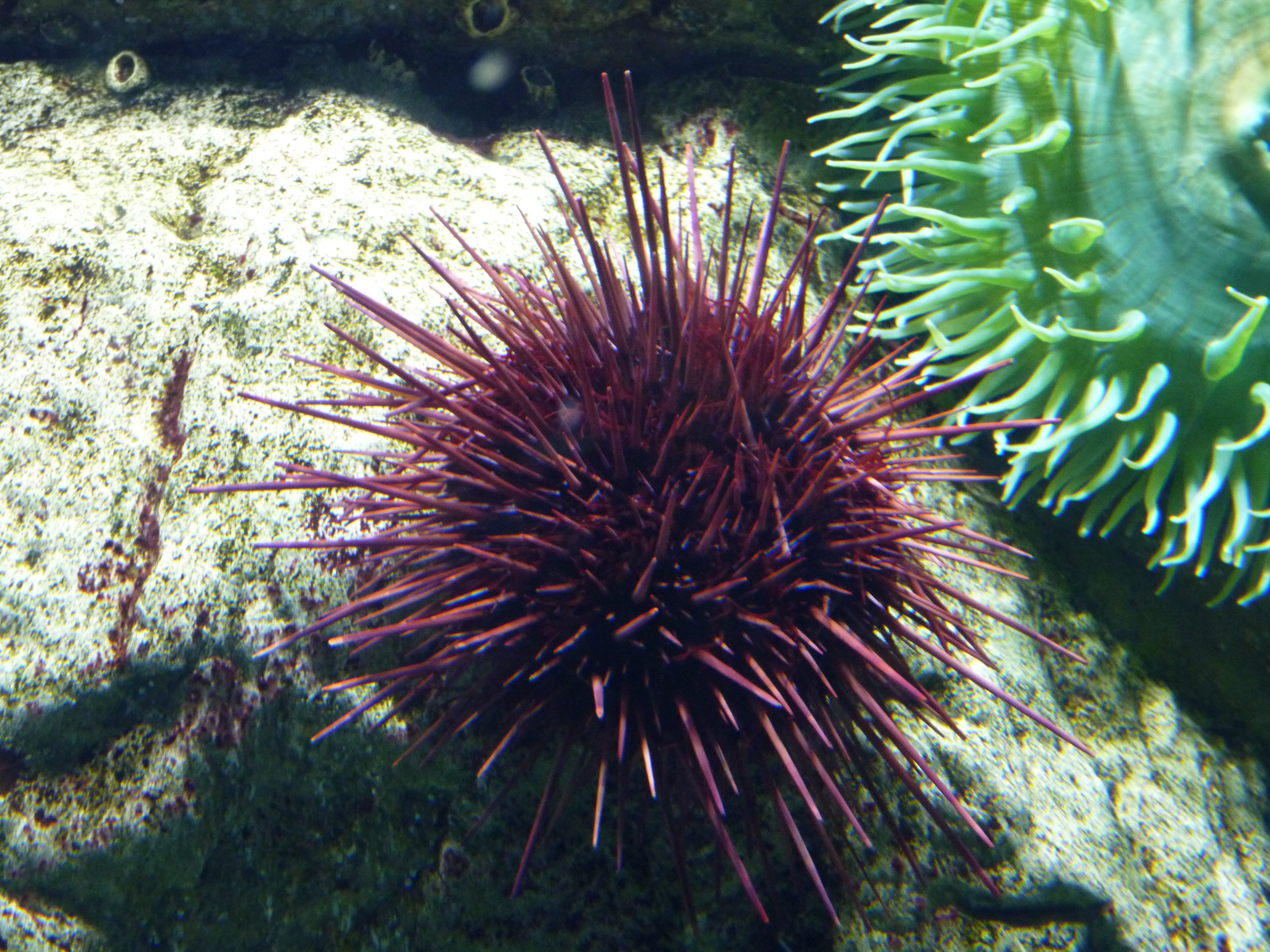
Paracentrotus lividus (purple sea urchin)

- Paracentrotus lividus (purple sea urchin)
- Psammechinus miliaris (green sea urchin / shore sea urchin)

=== Order Clypeasteroida (sand dollars) ===
==== Family Echinocyamidae ====
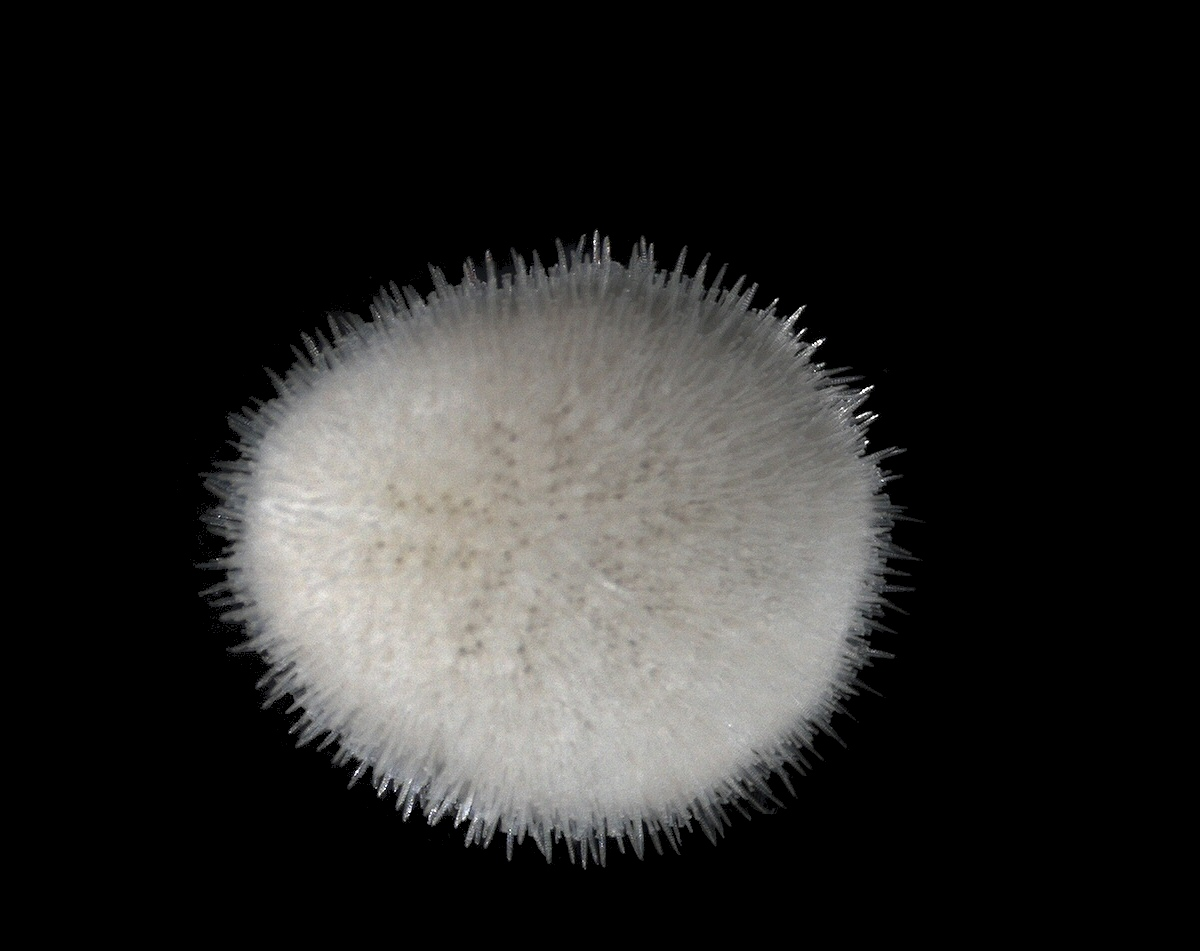
Pea urchin (Echinocyamus pusillus)

- Echinocyamus pusillus (pea urchin)

=== Order Echinoida ===
==== Family Echinidae ====
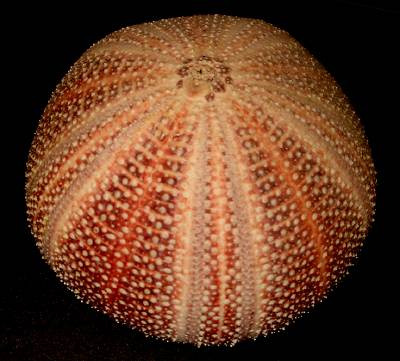
Echinus esculentus

- Echinus esculentus (European edible sea urchin)

=== Order Spatangoida (heart urchins) ===
==== Family Loveniidae ====
- Echinocardium cordatum (sea potato)
- Echinocardium flavescens (yellow sea potato)
- Echinocardium pennatifidum

== Class Holothuroidea (sea cucumbers) ==
=== Order Apodida ===
==== Family Synaptidae ====
- Labidoplax digitata
- Leptosynapta bergensis
- Leptosynapta inhaerens

=== Order Holothuriida ===
==== Family Holothuriidae ====
- Holothuria forskali (black sea cucumber / cotton-spinner)

=== Order Dendrochirotida ===
==== Family Cucumariidae ====
- Aslia lefevrei
- Cucumaria frondosa (orange-footed sea cucumber)
- Leptopentacta elongata
- Ocnus lacteus
- Ocnus planci
- Paracucumaria hyndmani (Hyndman's sea apple)
- Pawsonia saxicola (sea gherkin)
- Thyonidium drummondii

==== Family Phyllophoridae ====
- Neopentadactyla mixta
- Thyone fusus
- Thyone roscovita

== Class Ophiuroidea (brittle stars) ==
=== Order Ophiurida ===
==== Family Amphiuridae (long-armed burrowing brittle stars) ====
- Amphipholis squamata (brooding snake star, dwarf brittle star)
- Amphiura brachiata
- Amphiura chiajei
- Amphiura filiformis
- Amphiura securigera

==== Family Ophiactidae ====
- Ophiactis balli
- Ophiopholis aculeata (crevice brittle star, daisy brittle star)

==== Family Ophiocomidae ====
- Ophiocomina nigra (black brittle star / black serpent star)
- Ophiopsila annulosa

==== Family Ophiothricidae ====
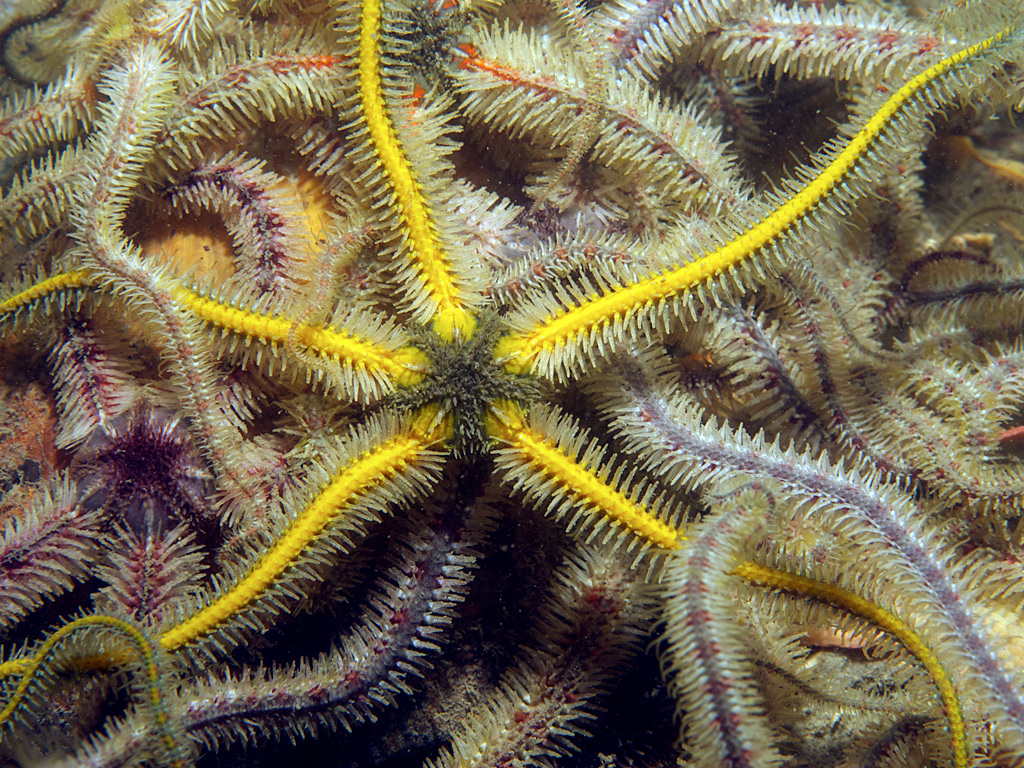
Ophiothrix fragilis photographed in Strangford Lough

- Ophiothrix fragilis (common brittle star)

==== Family Ophiuridae ====
- Ophiocten affinis
- Ophiura albida (serpent’s table brittle star)
- Ophiura ophiura (serpent star)
