= Asterocheres lilljeborgi =

Scientific classification
- Domain: Eukaryota
- Kingdom: Animalia
- Phylum: Arthropoda
- Class: Copepoda
- Order: Siphonostomatoida
- Family: Asterocheridae
- Genus: Asterocheres
- Species: A. lilljeborgi

Binomial name
- Asterocheres lilljeborgi Boeck, 1859

Synonyms
- Ascomyzon asterocheres Sars G.O., 1915; Asterocheres asterocheres (Sars G.O., 1915)

Species of crustacean

Asterocheres lilljeborgi is a species of copepod in the family Asterocheridae. It is found in the British Isles and Scandinavia where it is a semi-parasite of starfish. First described as Asterocheres lilljeborgi in 1859 by the Norwegian marine biologist Jonas Axel Boeck, it is the type species of the genus.

== Distribution ==
The species is found in west and south Norway, south-western Sweden, the Skagerrak, the North Sea, around the coasts of England and northern France as well as the Davis Strait, the Aleutian Islands and Alaska.

== Ecology ==
Asterocheres lilljeborgi is associated with starfish, such as the bloody Henry starfish (Henricia oculata) or the blood star (Henricia sanguinolenta). Some 90% of the starfish examined were parasitised.
