= Thyone adinopoda =

Scientific classification
- Domain: Eukaryota
- Kingdom: Animalia
- Phylum: Echinodermata
- Class: Holothuroidea
- Order: Dendrochirotida
- Family: Phyllophoridae
- Genus: Thyone
- Species: T. adinopoda

Binomial name
- Thyone adinopoda Pawson & Miller, 1981

Species of south and north American sea cucumber

Thyone adinopoda is a species of sea cucumber that is found in the Gulf of Mexico and the Atlantic Ocean, off the coast of French Guinea.
