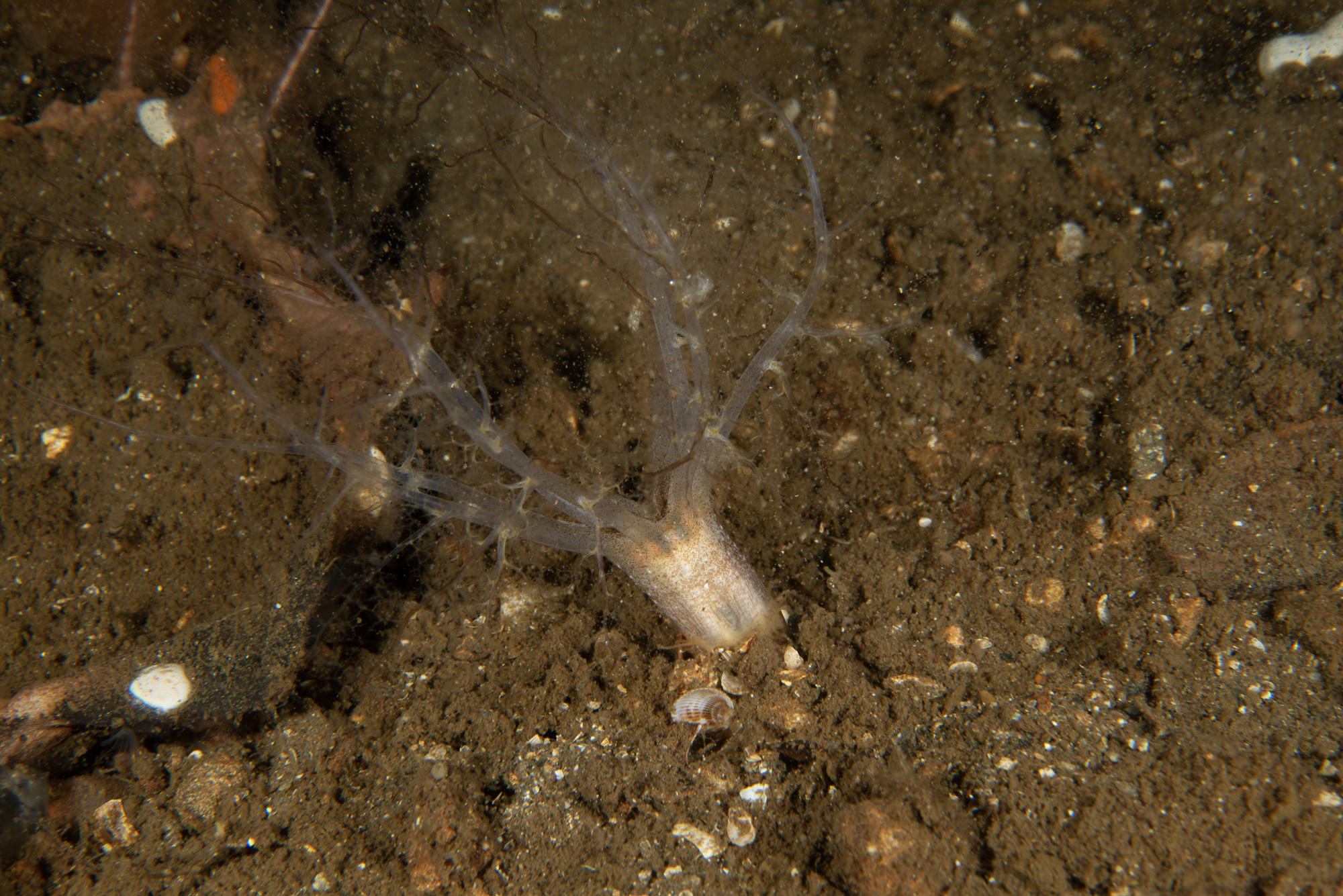
- Thyone fusus observed off Ireland.

Scientific classification
- Kingdom: Animalia
- Phylum: Echinodermata
- Class: Holothuroidea
- Order: Dendrochirotida
- Family: Phyllophoridae
- Genus: Thyone
- Species: T. fusus

Binomial name
- Thyone fusus (O.F. Müller, 1776)

Synonyms
- Cucumaria villosa Grube, 1871; Holothuria fusus Müller, 1776; Holothuria gaertneri de Blainville, 1821; Holothuria papillosa Abildgaard in Müller, 1789; Holothuria penicillus Müller, 1776; Holothuria scotica Dalyell, 1851; Semperia barroisi Lampert, 1885; Thyone flexus Hodge, 1865; Thyone subvillosa Hérouard, 1889

= Thyone fusus =

Species of sea cucumber

Thyone fusus is a species of sea cucumber in the family Phyllophoridae. It is found on the seabed in the northeastern Atlantic Ocean and the Mediterranean Sea. It is a suspension feeder and catches food particles floating past with its branching feeding tentacles.

== Description ==
Thyone fusus has an oval body up to 200 mm (8 in) long. The anterior (front) end has a mouth surrounded by a circle of ten branching tentacles while the posterior (back) end bears the anus and is bluntly rounded. There are a few tube feet, and these may be arranged in longitudinal rows. The skin is smooth and fine with few calcareous spicules; these spicules are usually table-shaped, with four holes and a pair of fused rods making a spire, and may also be present in the tube feet. The colour of this sea cucumber is usually some shade of brown, pink or white.

== Distribution and habitat ==
Thyone fusus is found in the northeastern Atlantic Ocean and the Mediterranean Sea, its range extending from Norway southwards to Madeira. In the British Isles it is present from the Shetland Isles southwards along the east coast of Scotland to Northumberland. Its depth range is from 10 to 615 m (30 to 2,020 ft). It is found in sheltered positions on shelly and muddy seabeds where it lies buried with just the tentacles and anterior end exposed.

== Ecology ==
Thyone fusus is a suspension feeder, consuming diatoms, single-cell algae and drifting organic particles, as well as zooplankton such as copepods, ostracods, protozoans, nematodes, jellyfish and larvae. The two ventral feeding tentacles are much shorter than the others and have forked ends. Each large tentacle in turn shrinks and folds and is pushed into the mouth. A small tentacle is held close to the mouth and cooperates with each of the others by scraping off any food particles that are still adhering to the large one when it is withdrawn from the mouth.

On the western coast of Ireland, these sea cucumbers bury themselves in the sediment between October and February and go into a form of hibernation. They do not feed during this time and their body wall condition deteriorates, but the gonads continue developing, and spawning takes place in early spring.
