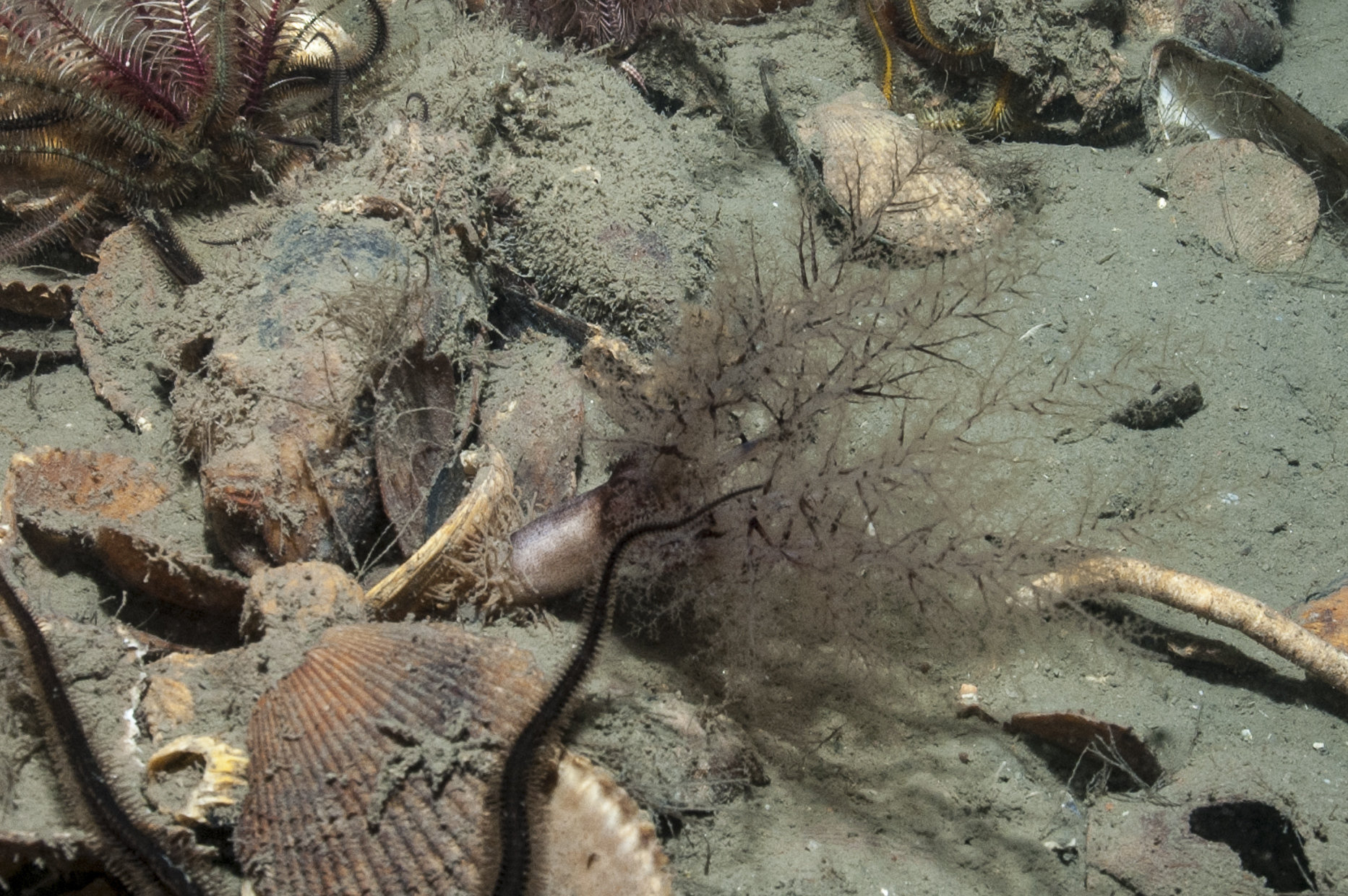

Scientific classification
- Kingdom: Animalia
- Phylum: Echinodermata
- Class: Holothuroidea
- Order: Dendrochirotida
- Family: Phyllophoridae
- Genus: Thyone
- Species: T. roscovita

Binomial name
- Thyone roscovita Hérouard, 1889

= Thyone roscovita =

Species of echinoderm (sea cucumber)

Thyone roscovita is a species of sea cucumber in the family Phyllophoridae. It is found on gravel, sand and mud substrates in the north-eastern Atlantic Ocean and the Mediterranean Sea at depths down to about 40 m (130 ft). It is a suspension feeder and catches food particles floating past with its branched feeding tentacles.

== Description ==
Thyone roscovita has a cylindrical body up to 80 mm (3 in) long. The general colour is pinkish-grey or pinkish-brown, with scattered darker brown and opaque spots. The body has a thick cuticle, and is densely covered with yellowish, flat-topped tube feet. The anterior (front) end has a mouth surrounded by a ring of ten branching tentacles, and the plume of tentacles is often the only part of the animal visible, the body being buried in the sediment. The tentacular plume is up to 60 mm (2 in) long; the bases of the tentacles are thick and whitish, the secondary branches are black and needle-like, and these bear transparent wispy filaments that give a vaporous effect.

== Distribution and habitat ==
Thyone roscovita is native to the north-eastern Atlantic Ocean, the North Sea, the English Channel and the Mediterranean Sea. Its range extends from the Shetland Isles and the coasts of Britain and Ireland to the Bay of Biscay and the western Mediterranean Sea. It is found semi-buried in the sediment on soft bottoms, such as gravel, shelly sand or mud, from the intertidal zone down to about 40 m (130 ft). Less frequently, it tucks itself into a rock crevice, with just its tentacles projecting.

== Ecology ==
Thyone roscovita unfurls its oral tentacles and uses them to catch organic particles floating past. The smallest branches have adhesive papillae to which the particles stick. The tentacles are retracted in a predetermined order to transfer any food caught to the mouth. The sexes are separate in this species. The gametes are liberated into the water column where fertilisation takes place. The barrel-shaped larvae have a short planktonic life before sinking to the seabed and undergoing metamorphosis into juvenile sea cucumbers.
