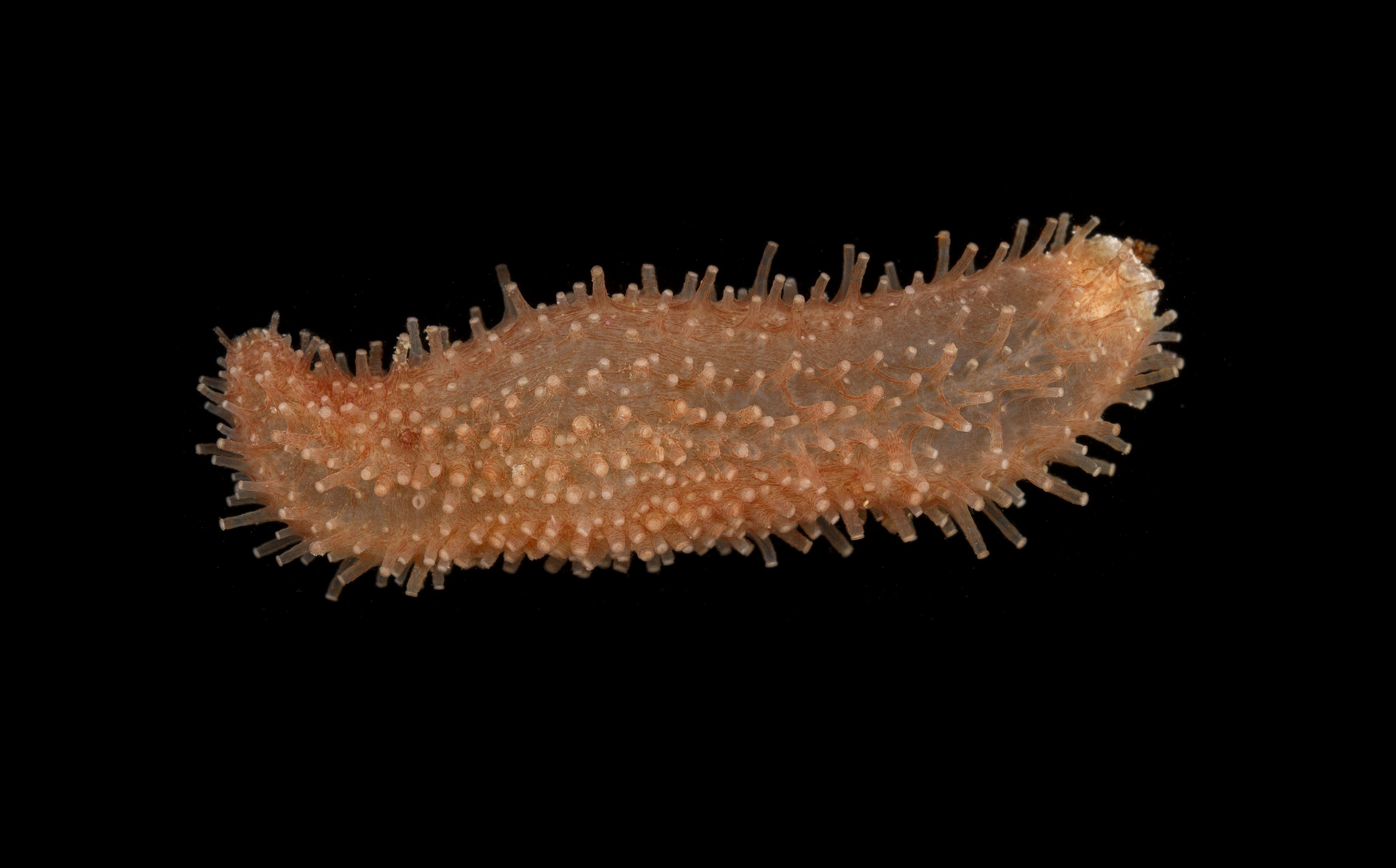

Scientific classification
- Kingdom: Animalia
- Phylum: Echinodermata
- Class: Holothuroidea
- Order: Dendrochirotida
- Family: Phyllophoridae
- Genus: Lipotrapeza
- Species: L. vestiens

Binomial name
- Lipotrapeza vestiens (Joshua, 1914)

Synonyms
- Phyllophorus vestiens (Joshua, 1914)

= Lipotrapeza vestiens =

Species of sea cucumber

Lipotrapeza vestiens is a species of sea cucumber in the genus Lipotrapeza. The species is found in South Australia, often concealing itself with sand at a depth of at least 12 feet.
