= Thyone =

Thyone can refer to:

- An alternative name for Semele in Greek mythology
- Thyone (moon), a moon of Jupiter
- Thyone (echinoderm), a genus of sea cucumbers
- A synonym for the moth genus Asaphodes Walker, 1862
