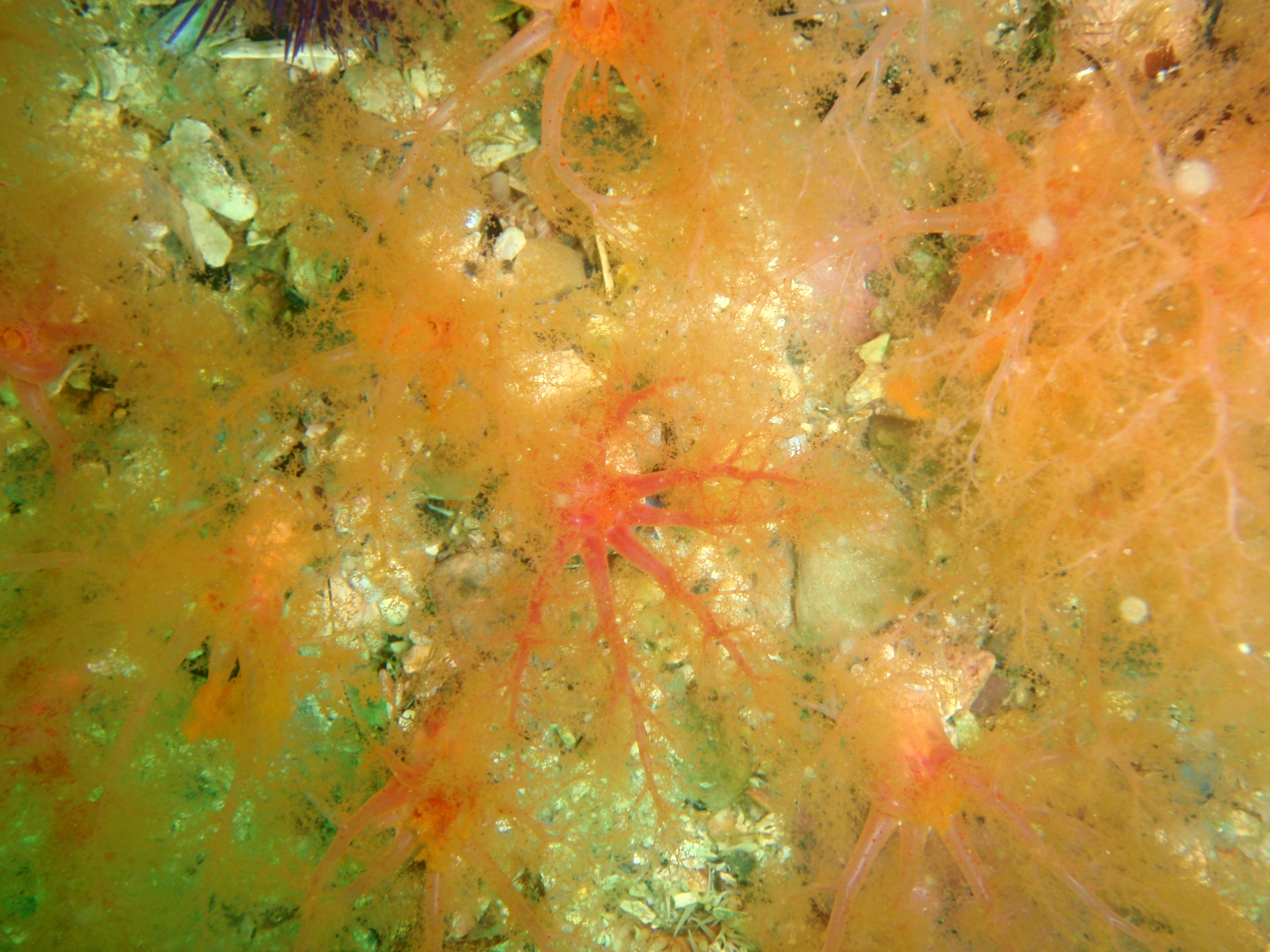

Scientific classification
- Kingdom: Animalia
- Phylum: Echinodermata
- Class: Holothuroidea
- Order: Dendrochirotida
- Family: Phyllophoridae
- Genus: Thyone
- Species: T. aurea

Binomial name
- Thyone aurea (Quoy & Gaimard, 1834)

= Thyone aurea =

Species of sea cucumber

Thyone aurea is a species of sea cucumber belonging to the family Phyllophoridae.

The species is found in Southern Africa.
