= Leptosynapta bergensis =

Scientific classification
- Domain: Eukaryota
- Kingdom: Animalia
- Phylum: Echinodermata
- Class: Holothuroidea
- Order: Apodida
- Family: Synaptidae
- Genus: Leptosynapta
- Species: L. bergensis

Binomial name
- Leptosynapta bergensis (Östergren, 1905)

Synonyms
- Synapta bergensis Östergren, 1905

Species of sea cucumber

Leptosynapta bergensis is a species of sea cucumber of the family Synaptidae.

== Description ==
This species of holothurian is pink with longitudinal muscle-bands and a slender and soft body. It has twelve pinnate tentacles and no tube-feet. Each tentacle has 8–11 pairs of digits. It grows to 10–30 cm (3.9–11.8 in).

== Distribution ==
It can be found on all coasts of Great Britain and Ireland and Scandinavia; it is common in Strangford Lough. It is generally found further north than Leptosynapta inhaerens.

== Habitat ==
Leptosynapta bergensis lives from low on shore to over 100 m (330 ft) deep, buried in muddy sand.

== Life cycle ==
Leptosynapta bergensis is gonochoric and has only one gonad. Spawning and fertilization both happen externally. Embryos develop into planktotrophic larvae (auricularia), then into doliolaria (barrel-shaped) and then metamorphose into juvenile sea cucumbers.
