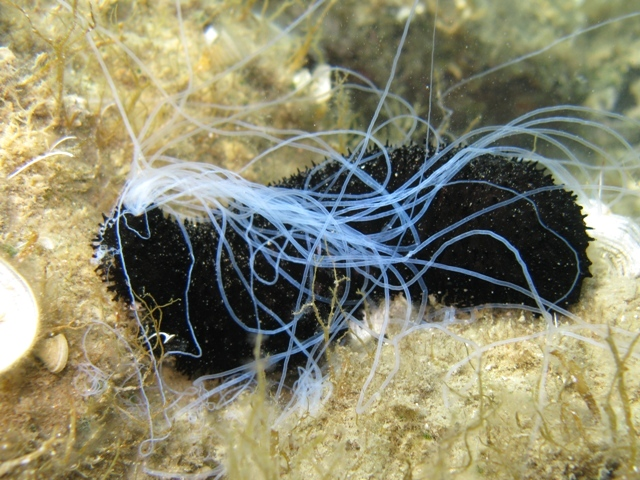

Conservation status
- Least Concern (IUCN 3.1)

Scientific classification
- Kingdom: Animalia
- Phylum: Echinodermata
- Class: Holothuroidea
- Order: Holothuriida
- Family: Holothuriidae
- Genus: Holothuria
- Species: H. forskali

Binomial name
- Holothuria forskali Delle Chiaje, 1823

Synonyms
- H. catanensis Grube, 1840; H. nigra Peach, 1845; Stichopus selenkae Barrois, 1882

= Holothuria forskali =

Species of sea cucumber

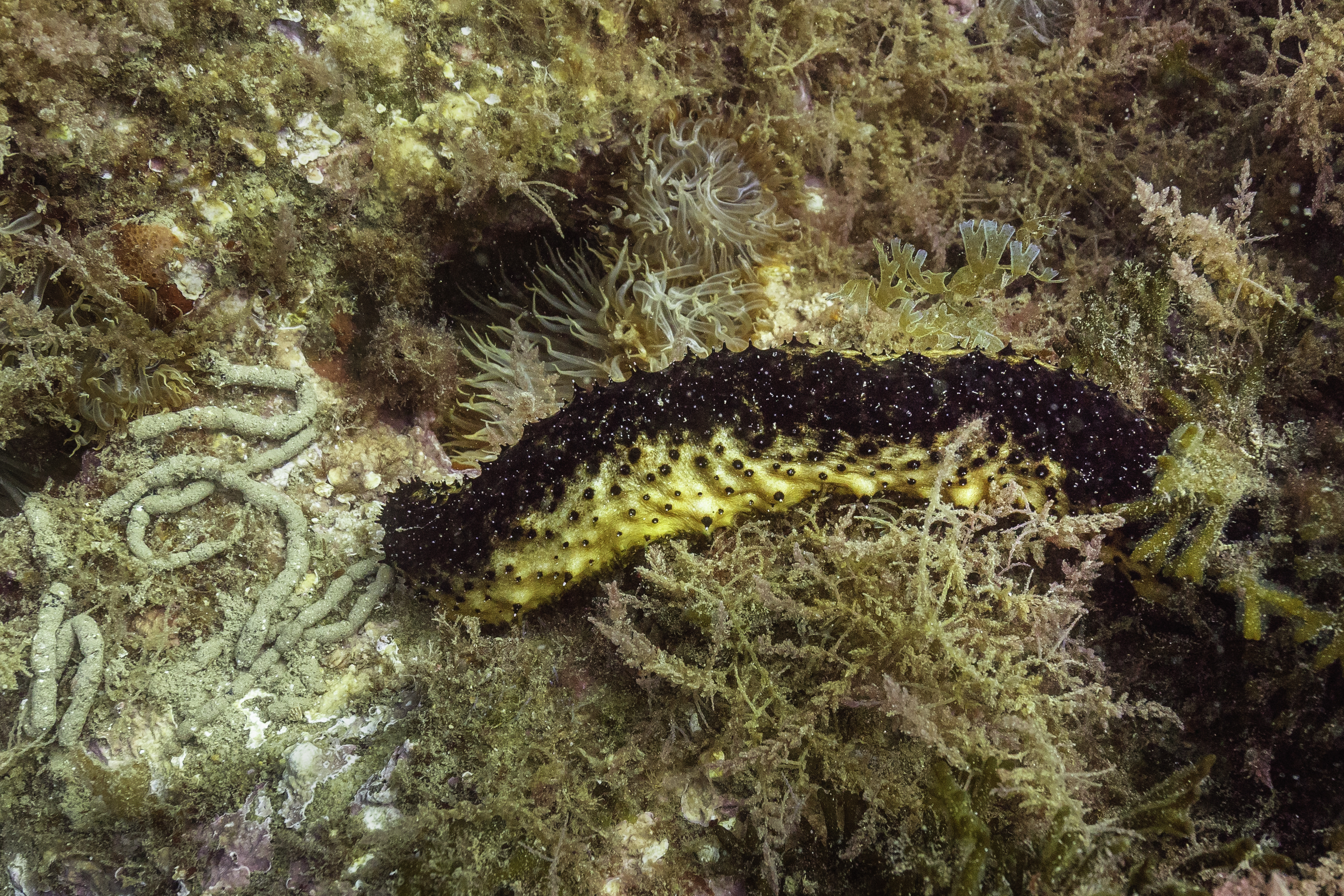
Holothuria forskali in the atlantic coast of Portugal.

Holothuria forskali, the black sea cucumber or cotton-spinner is a species of sea cucumber in the family Holothuriidae. It is found at shallow depths in the eastern Atlantic Ocean and the Mediterranean Sea. It was placed in the subgenus Panningothuria by Rowe in 1969 and is the type taxon of the subgenus.

Sea cucumbers are marine invertebrates and are closely related to the sea urchins and starfish. All these groups tend to be radially symmetric and have a water vascular system that operates by hydrostatic pressure, enabling them to move around by use of many suckers known as tube feet. Sea cucumbers are usually leathery, gherkin-shaped animals with a cluster of short tentacles at one end.

== Description ==
This sea cucumber has a cylindrical body and can grow to thirty centimetres long. It is usually deep brown or black but sometimes has an underlying yellowish mottling, especially on the underside. The skin is soft yet coarse and tough and is covered with fleshy papillae which are often tipped with white. The papillae are believed to be sensory organs sensitive to touch and possibly to chemicals dissolved in the water. The underside has three rows of tube feet for walking and climbing while the upper side has two rows of rudimentary suckers. The anterior end has a bunch of twenty yellowish short, retractable tentacles encircling the mouth. At the posterior, inside the body cavity, there are a bundle of Cuvierian tubules or cotton glands which can be ejected as a tangle of sticky white threads to confuse or enmesh predators.

== Distribution ==
The black sea cucumber occurs around the Atlantic coasts of northwest Europe, the Canary Islands, the Azores and in the Mediterranean Sea. It is found on boulders and rocks, particularly vertical surfaces, from the intertidal zone down to a depth of about fifty metres.

== Biology ==
The black sea cucumber is a detritivore and feeds mostly at night. When feeding, it bends its body down towards the substrate, presses the ring of oral papillae against the surface and opens its mouth wide. It then extends and retracts its short tentacles repeatedly and "vacuums" up sediment, extracts the nutritious part and deposits the unmetabolised portion as a sausage-like string of droppings. When not feeding, the mouth is closed and the tentacles retracted and it is difficult to tell which is the head end of the animal.

Adult black sea cucumbers are normally either male or female. The gonads take a long time to mature and gametes are released synchronously into the water column in early spring, probably as a result of a rise in water temperatures. The larvae become part of the zooplankton. After several moults they grow tentacles and settle out onto the sea floor. Juveniles are seldom seen so it is surmised that they live by day in crevices and under rocks for protection from predators whereas the adults take no particular care to remain hidden.

== Ecology ==
The parasitic copepod Asterocheres boecki is an endoparasite of the black sea cucumber.

It has been found that twenty-six saponins (triterpene glycosides) are present in the Cuvierian tubules and twelve in the animal's body wall. During stressful times, such as the presence of a predator, saponins are released into the surrounding water. It is thought that, though these are insufficient to harm a potential predator, they may serve as a warning that the cucumber is unpalatable.
