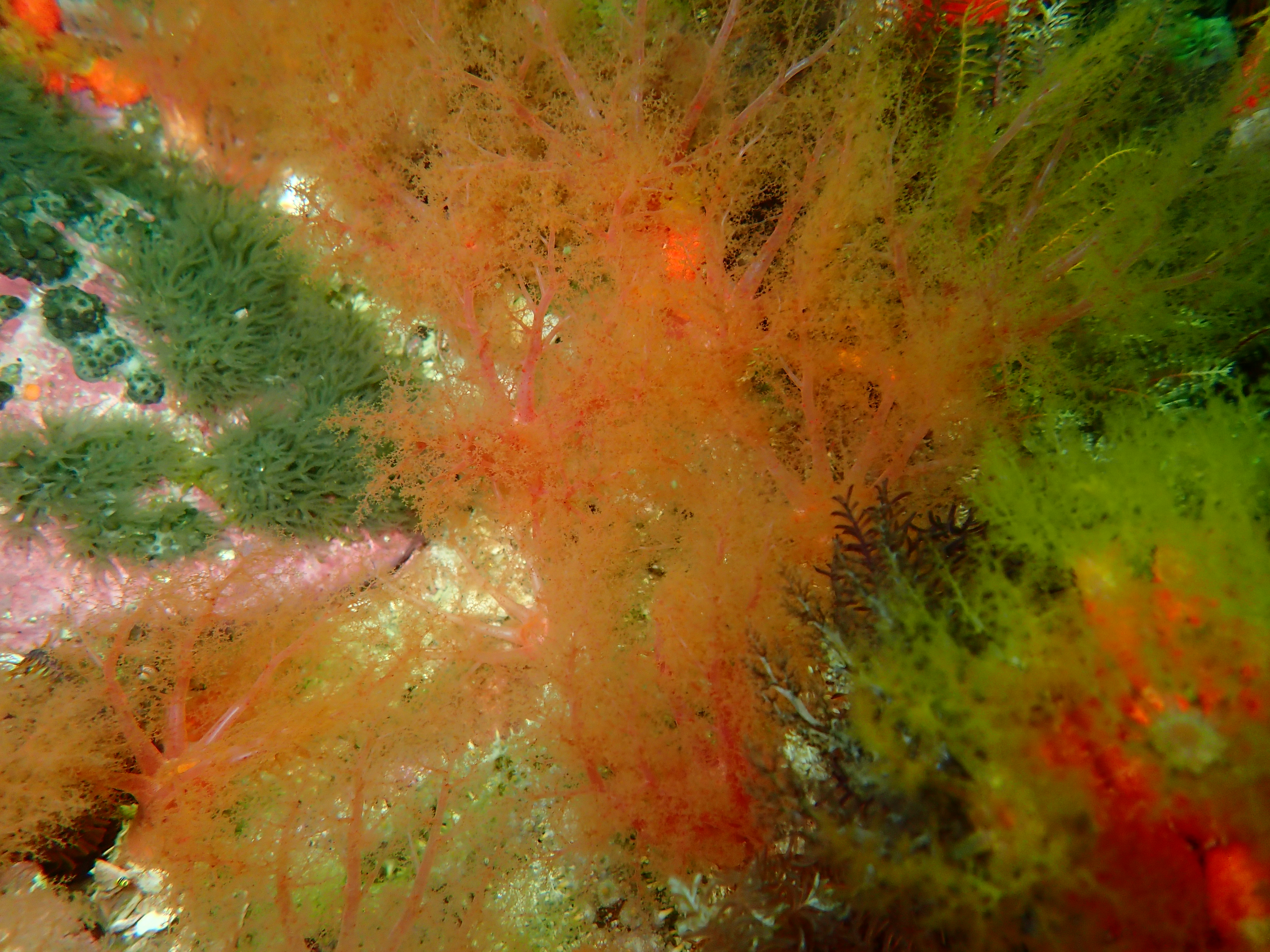
- Thyone aurea

Scientific classification
- Kingdom: Animalia
- Phylum: Echinodermata
- Class: Holothuroidea
- Order: Dendrochirotida
- Family: Phyllophoridae
- Genus: Thyone; Oken, 1815

Type species
- Holothuria fusus Müller, 1776

Synonyms
- Subuculus Oken, 1815; Uroxia Costa, 1869

= Thyone (echinoderm) =

Genus of sea cucumbers

Thyone is a genus of sea cucumbers in the family Phyllophoridae.

== Species ==
The following species are accepted in the genus Thyone:

1. Thyone adinopoda Pawson & Miller, 1981
2. Thyone andrewsii (Farran, 1860)
3. Thyone anomala Östergren, 1898
4. Thyone aurea (Quoy & Gaimard, 1834)
5. Thyone avenusta Cherbonnier, 1970
6. Thyone axiologa H.L. Clark, 1938
7. Thyone bacescoi Cherbonnier, 1972
8. Thyone benti Deichmann, 1937
9. Thyone bicornis Ohshima, 1915
10. Thyone bidentata Deichmann, 1941
11. Thyone brasiliana Prata, Manso & Christoffersen, 2020
12. Thyone carens Cherbonnier, 1988
13. Thyone cherbonnieri Reys, 1959
14. Thyone comata Cherbonnier, 1988
15. Thyone crassidisca Pawson & Miller, 1981
16. Thyone crebrapodia Cherbonnier, 1988
17. Thyone curvata Lampert, 1885
18. Thyone deichmannae Madsen, 1941
19. Thyone discolor Sluiter, 1901
20. Thyone dura Koehler & Vaney, 1908
21. Thyone flindersi O'Loughlin, 2012
22. Thyone florianoi Martins & Tavares, 2018
23. Thyone fusca Pearson, 1903
24. Thyone fusus (O.F. Müller, 1776) - type species (as Holothuria fusus Müller, 1776)
25. Thyone gadeana R. Perrier, 1898
26. Thyone grisea H.L. Clark, 1938
27. Thyone guillei Cherbonnier, 1988
28. Thyone herberti Thandar & Rajpal, 1999
29. Thyone hirta Cherbonnier, 1970
30. Thyone imperfecta (Cherbonnier, 1970)
31. Thyone inermis Heller, 1868
32. Thyone infusca Cherbonnier, 1954
33. Thyone joshuai O'Loughlin, 2012
34. Thyone kerkosa O'Loughlin, 2012
35. Thyone longicornis Cherbonnier, 1988
36. Thyone micra H.L. Clark, 1938
37. Thyone montoucheti Tommasi, 1971
38. Thyone neofusus Deichmann, 1941
39. Thyone nigra Joshua & Creed, 1915
40. Thyone okeni Bell, 1884
41. Thyone papuensis Théel, 1886
42. Thyone parafusus Deichmann, 1941
43. Thyone pawsoni Tommasi, 1972
44. Thyone pedata Semper, 1867
45. Thyone pohaiensis Liao, 1986
46. Thyone polybranchia Östergren, 1898
47. Thyone profusus Cherbonnier & Féral, 1981
48. Thyone propinqua Cherbonnier, 1970
49. Thyone pseudofusus Deichmann, 1930
50. Thyone purpureopunctata Liao & Pawson, 2001
51. Thyone quadruperforata Cherbonnier, 1954
52. Thyone roscovita Hérouard, 1889
53. Thyone sinensis Liao & Pawson, 2001
54. Thyone sineturra Cherbonnier, 1988
55. Thyone spenceri O'Loughlin, 2012
56. Thyone spinifera Liao, 1995
57. Thyone strangeri Deichmann, 1941
58. Thyone susamiensis Yamana, Hirai & Hirashima, 2015
59. Thyone tanyspiera Pawson & Miller, 1988
60. Thyone theeli Rowe, 1995
61. Thyone tourvillei O'Loughlin, 2012
62. Thyone vadosa Cherbonnier, 1988
63. Thyone venusta Selenka, 1868
64. Thyone venustella Ludwig & Heding, 1935
65. Thyone villosa Semper, 1867
66. Thyone vitrea Sluiter, 1901
67. Thyone waltinhoi Martins & Souto, 2018
