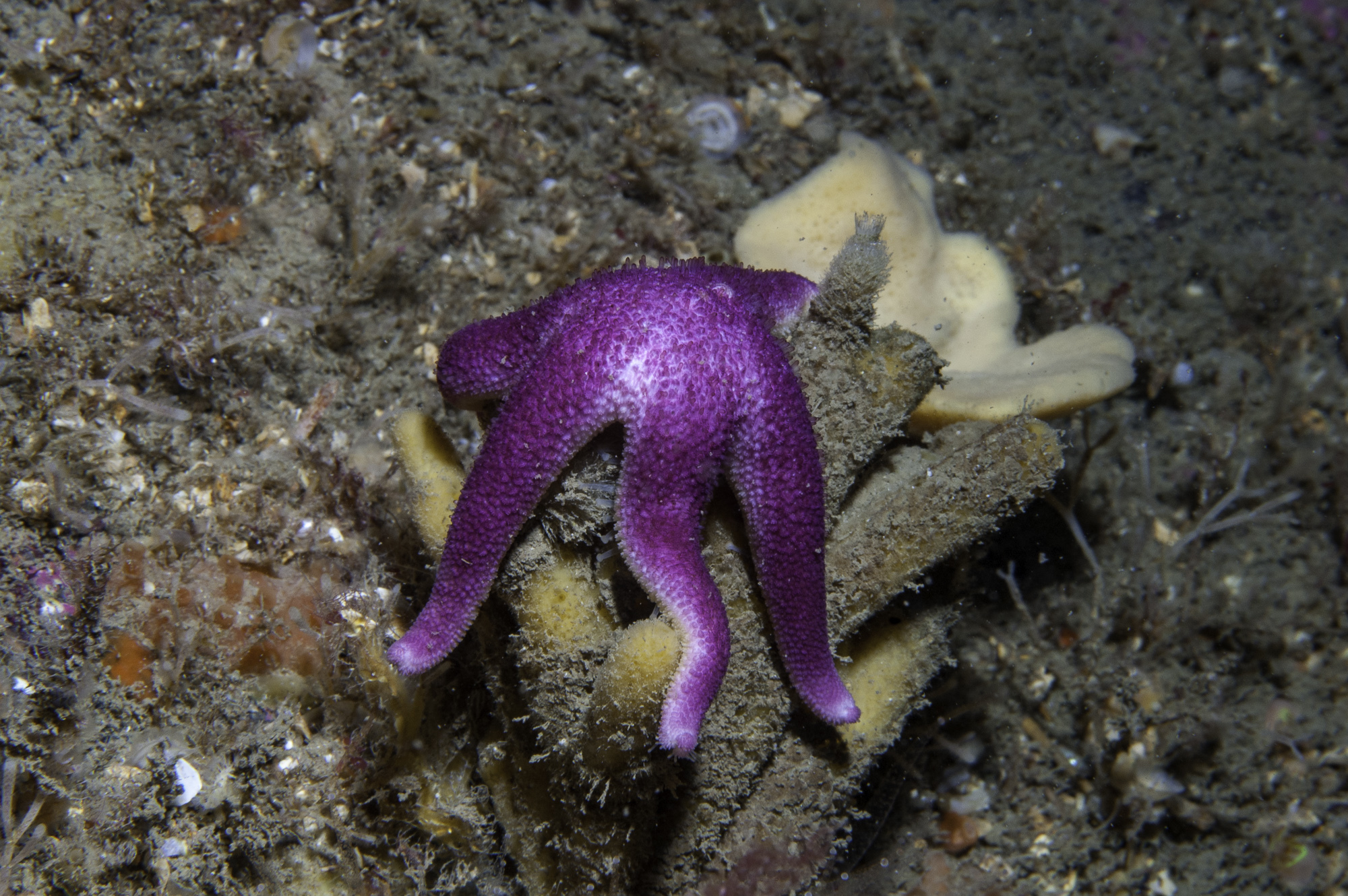
- Henricia oculata

Scientific classification
- Domain: Eukaryota
- Kingdom: Animalia
- Phylum: Echinodermata
- Class: Asteroidea
- Order: Spinulosida
- Family: Echinasteridae
- Genus: Henricia
- Species: H. oculata

Binomial name
- Henricia oculata (Pennant, 1777)

Synonyms
- Asterias oculata Pennant, 1777; Cribrella oculata (Pennant, 1777); Cribrella sarsi Perrier, 1878

= Henricia oculata =

Species of starfish

Henricia oculata, commonly known as the bloody Henry starfish, is a species of starfish in the family Echinasteridae. It is native to northwestern Europe. It was first described as Asterias oculata by the British zoologist Thomas Pennant in 1777, later being transferred to the genus Henricia.

== Description ==
Henricia oculata (NB: This translates from Latin as "eyed Henry") is a five-armed starfish that grows to a diameter of about 12 cm (5 in). It is rather rigid and the aboral (upper) surface feels rough due to there being numerous low spines under the skin. It is variable in colour, being dark red, brown, purple or yellowish, the outer portions of the arms sometimes being paler than the disc and inner portions. It is very similar in appearance to Henricia sanguinolenta, but tends to have more irregularly arranged dorsal spinelets that are more opaque.

== Distribution ==
The species is found in the northeastern Atlantic Ocean, mainly around the coasts of the United Kingdom and Ireland. It also occurs in Guernsey, Jersey and northern France, and there have been isolated occurrences in Norway and the United States. It is most common on the western coasts of the British Isles and occurs on rock, boulders, stones, shingle, gravel, and shelly substrates. Its depth range is from the low intertidal down to 50 m (160 ft) or more.

== Ecology ==
Primarily a suspension feeder, H. oculata consumes suspended organic particles, detritus, sponges, hydroids and bryozoans, but the starfish can supplement these by everting its stomach to feed on other invertebrates. More than 90% of individuals of this species are associated with a parasitic copepod, Asterocheres lilljeborgi.
