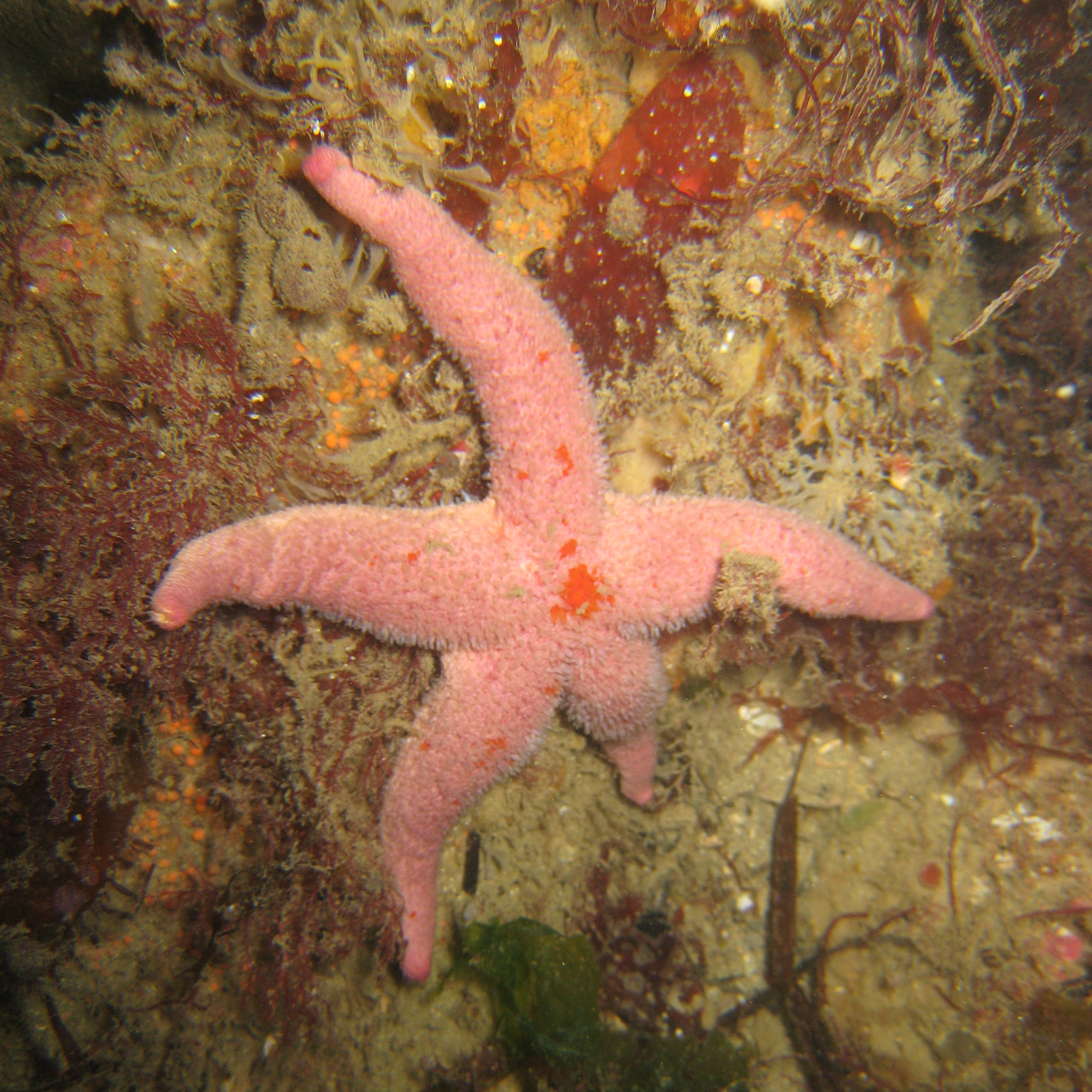
- A Henricia sanguinolenta sea star

Scientific classification
- Kingdom: Animalia
- Phylum: Echinodermata
- Class: Asteroidea
- Order: Spinulosida
- Family: Echinasteridae
- Genus: Henricia
- Species: H. sanguinolenta

Binomial name
- Henricia sanguinolenta (O.F. Müller, 1776)

= Henricia sanguinolenta =

Species of starfish

Henricia sanguinolenta, commonly known as the northern henricia, is a species of sea star from the North Atlantic and North Pacific Oceans. Henricia sanguinolenta is very similar to Henricia oculata, also known as "bloody Henry", and the two can only be distinguished by laboratory tests. It comes in colors of red, yellow, orange, purple, and lavender.

== Habitat ==
Henricia sanguinolenta is found in the North Atlantic and North Pacific oceans. The sea star can be seen on the beach, under rocks, in tidal pools when available, and on gravel. Its aquatic biomes are the coastal and benthic zones. The sea star is almost always found near sponges and coral because of the currents they create, making it easier for the sea star to filter feed. Henricia sanguinolenta is found from depths of 0 to 2414 meters.

== Diet ==
Henricia sanguinolenta is a planktivore and carnivore. The sea star filter feeds upon detritus and plankton floating in the water, and uses currents made by sponges or coral to make this process easier. Henricia feeds on plankton, sponge tissue, ascidians, and other invertebrates. It is eaten by vertebrates.

== Reproduction ==
Sexual reproduction

Henricia sanguinolenta is a stable gonochoric. The sea star usually reproduces during February and May. The sea stars migrate to warm, shallow water during the breeding season. The sea stars mate through disk fusion. The eggs are then kept under the disk of the female starfish to incubate after fertilization occurs. After incubation, the female deposits its eggs on the ground, secretes mucus onto them, and then stays on top of the eggs for three weeks while they hatch. The sea stars are polygamous. Henricia sanguinolenta has a diploid chromosome number of 36.

Asexual reproduction

Although Henricia sanguinolenta can reproduce sexually, it can also reproduce asexually. It reproduces asexually through the process of regeneration. The sea star can go through regeneration if the disc is split in half, or even if a ray is cut off. The regeneration process takes weeks to months to complete.

== Anatomy ==
Rays

Henricia sanguinolenta is an invertebrate. It has slender five rays that taper evenly to tips that are connected by a central disc. The sea star grows to a diameter of 5 to 12 centimeters. On the oral side, the rays are smooth and have an ambulacral groove that contains two tube foot rows. On the dorsal side, the rays are rough with groupings of spinelets, each one have three to six glassy points. The sides of the rays are curving and smooth. The rays contain many of the organs in the sea star. On the tips of the rays are the eyespots. These are dark pigmented organs that sense the presence of light. The rays also contain parts of the pyloric stomach, parts of the nervous system, and most other organs.

Tube foot rows

The tube foot rows are on the oral side of the rays. Each ray has two tube foot rows. The tube foot rows are attached to the rays by ambulacral grooves. The Tube Foot Rows use a chemical adhesive to stick to surfaces instead of suction. The tube foot rows help the sea star stick to its prey, and to bring the prey to its mouth. The tube foot rows also aid in gas exchange. the tube foot rows are sensitive to chemicals enabling the sea star to detect chemical trails left by possible food. The tube foot rows also excrete waste ammonia through diffusion.

Nervous system

Henricia sanguinolenta has no brain, but has a nervous system. The sea star has no capacity for planning. The nervous system has two parts. They are motor system and the sensory system which are interconnected by neurons. The motor system is responsible for movement and functioning and the sensory system is responsible for controlling the sensory organs. Both of these systems run up and down the arms, and around the disc.

Vascular tube system

Henricia sanguinolenta, like all other sea stars, uses water instead of blood. Henricia sanguinolenta pumps filtered seawater in and out of its body. This seawater is transported through a vascular tube system, and delivers nutrients to the different organs and helps in gas exchange. Water enters through the madreporite, a sieve-like structure on the oral side.

Body wall

The body wall is composed of epidermis, dermis, thin cuticle, and a thin coelomic myoepithelial layer.

Digestive system/stomachs

Henricia sanguinolenta has two stomachs, a small intestine, and a rectum leading to an anus. The two stomachs are called the cardiac stomach, and the pyloric stomach. The cardiac stomach is on the oral side, in the center of the disc. It is covered by a thin membrane and sphincter. When the sea star has its prey, it extends the stomach to envelope the prey. Once the prey is enveloped, it then retracts back into the disc, and transfers it to the pyloric stomach for further digestion. The pyloric stomach has two extensions into each arm called the pyloric caeca. These secrete digestive enzymes into the pyloric stomach. Then, the waste is transported through a short intestine, and rectum. The material that is left is secreted through a small anus on the oral side of the disc.

Papulae

The papulae are small are small gills on the rays and disc. Waste ammonia is transported to the tips of the papulae using phagocytic cells, and is then excreted.

Circulatory System

Henricia sanguinolenta has a circulatory system that forms three rings of vessels. They are called the hyponeural haemal ring, the gastric ring, and the genital ring. The heart beats six times every minute and connects all three vessels. At the base of each ray, there is a pair of gonads.

== Behavior ==
Henricia sanguinolenta shows behavioral adaptations in addition to physical ones. The sea star is usually seen with sponges and coral, using the currents they make to feed upon detritus. Henricia sanguinolenta is also one of the only species of sea stars that broods its eggs. The female stays with the eggs while they hatch, and continues to stay with them as larvae. The larvae stay in a dome shape created by the female's arms until they are ready to go into the ocean on their own. Until spring time, Henricia sanguinolenta lives a solitary life. Henricia sanguinolenta also doesn't react to the fluid of Asterias forbesi, which is toxic to most other sea stars.

== Impact on humans ==
Henricia sanguinolenta has no negative or positive impact on humans. The sea star is not harmful to humans or the economy, and only may slightly affect the tourist industry with its bright colors.
