= Tube feet =

Multipurpose organs of echinoderms

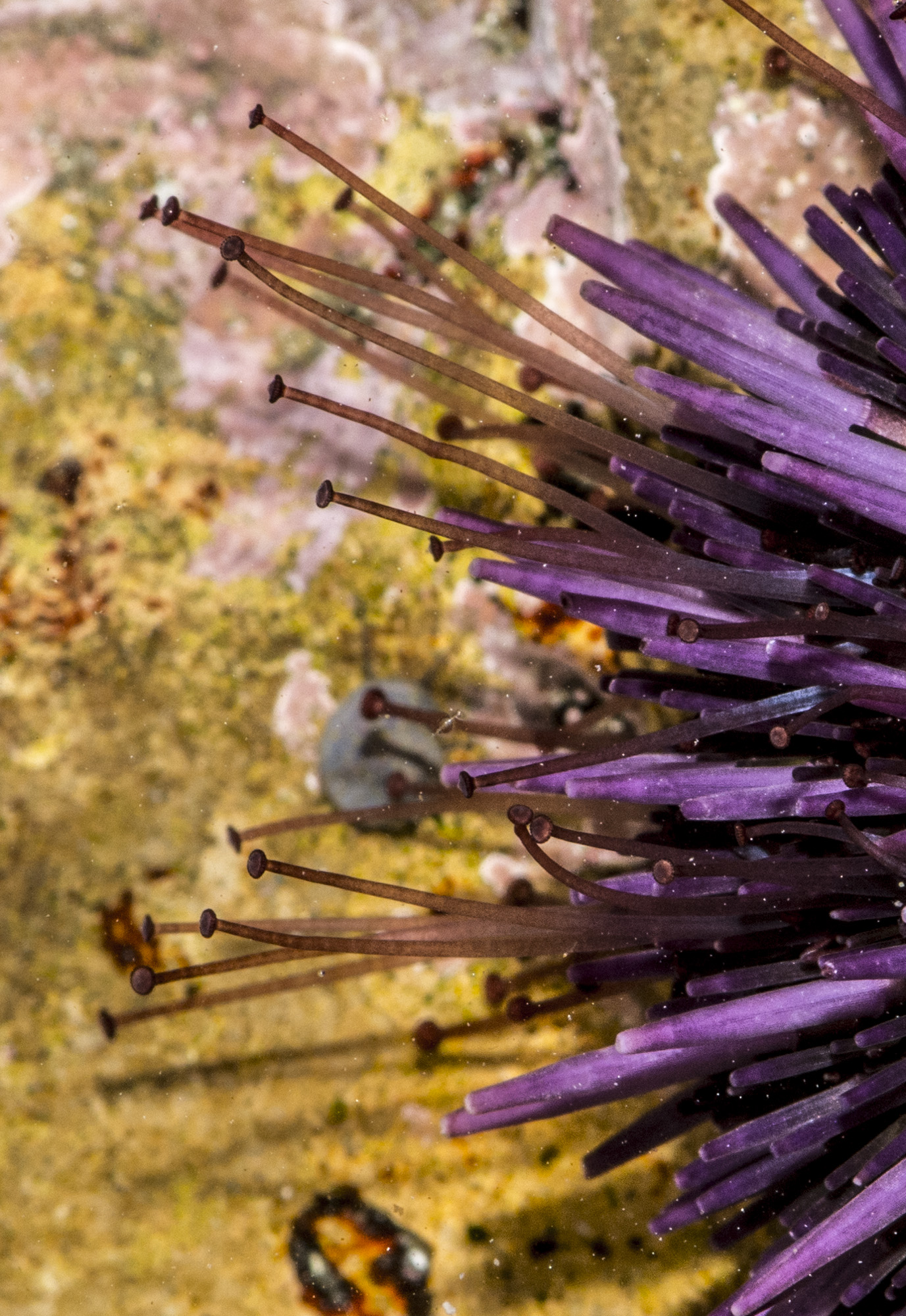
Sea urchin tube feet extended past the spines.

Tube feet (technically podia) are small active tubular projections on the oral face of an echinoderm, such as the arms of a starfish, or the undersides of sea urchins, sand dollars and sea cucumbers; they are more discreet though present on brittle stars, and have only a feeding function in feather stars. They are part of the water vascular system.

== Structure and function ==
Tube feet function in locomotion, feeding, and respiration. They operate through hydraulic pressure. They are used to pass food to the oral mouth at the center, and can attach to surfaces. The tube feet in a starfish are arranged in grooves along the arms. A starfish that is inverted turns one arm over and attaches it to a solid surface, and levers itself the right way up. Tube feet allow these different types of animals to stick to the ocean floor and move slowly.

Each tube foot consists of two parts: the ampulla and the podium. The ampulla is a water-filled sac contained in the body of the animal that contains both circular muscles and longitudinal muscle. The podium is the tube-shaped structure that protrudes from the body and contains longitudinal muscle only. When the muscles around the ampulla contract, they squeeze water from the ampulla into the connected podium, causing the podium to elongate. When the muscles around the podium contract, they squeeze the water back into the ampulla, causing the podium to contract. The podia use a chemical adhesive (no suction) to attach to the substratum.

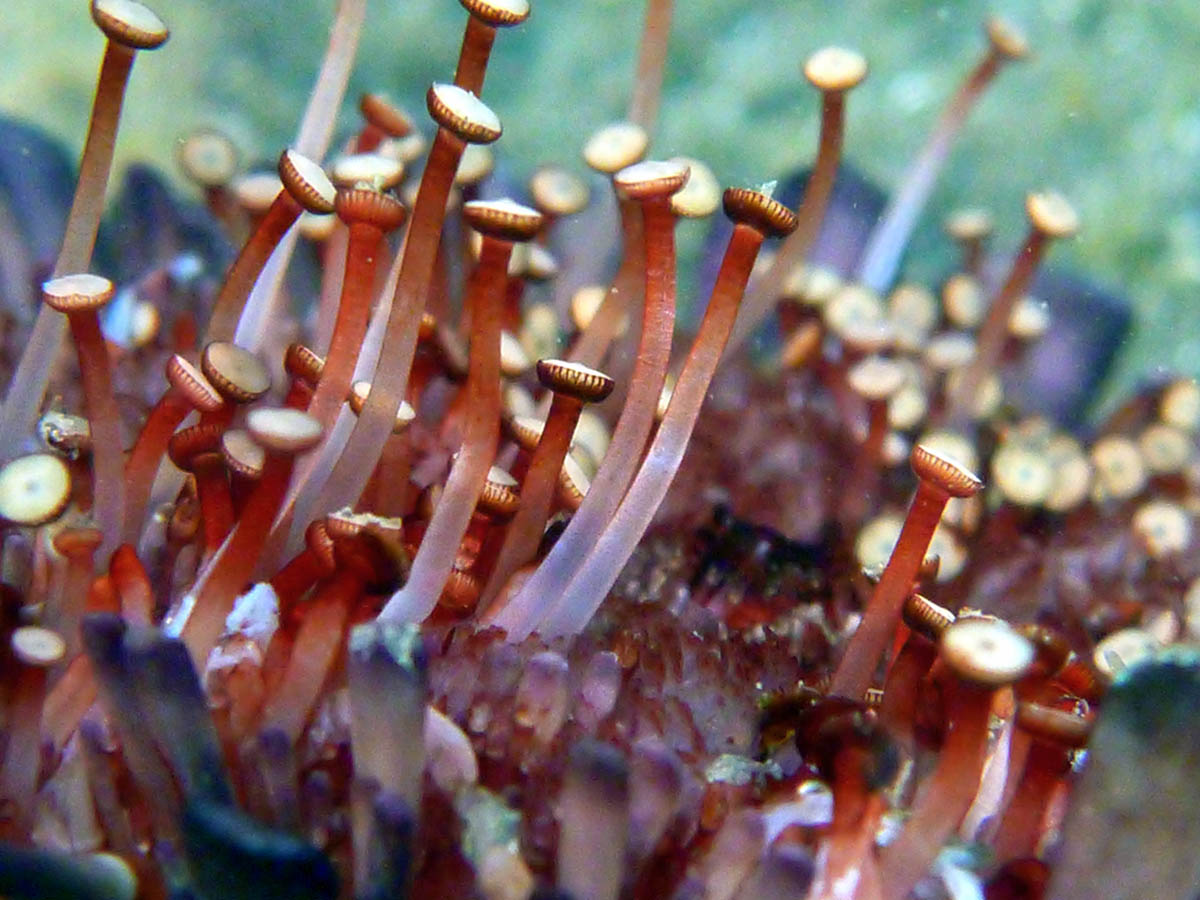
The shingle urchin (Colobocentrotus atratus) has among the most powerful podia of all echinoderms.

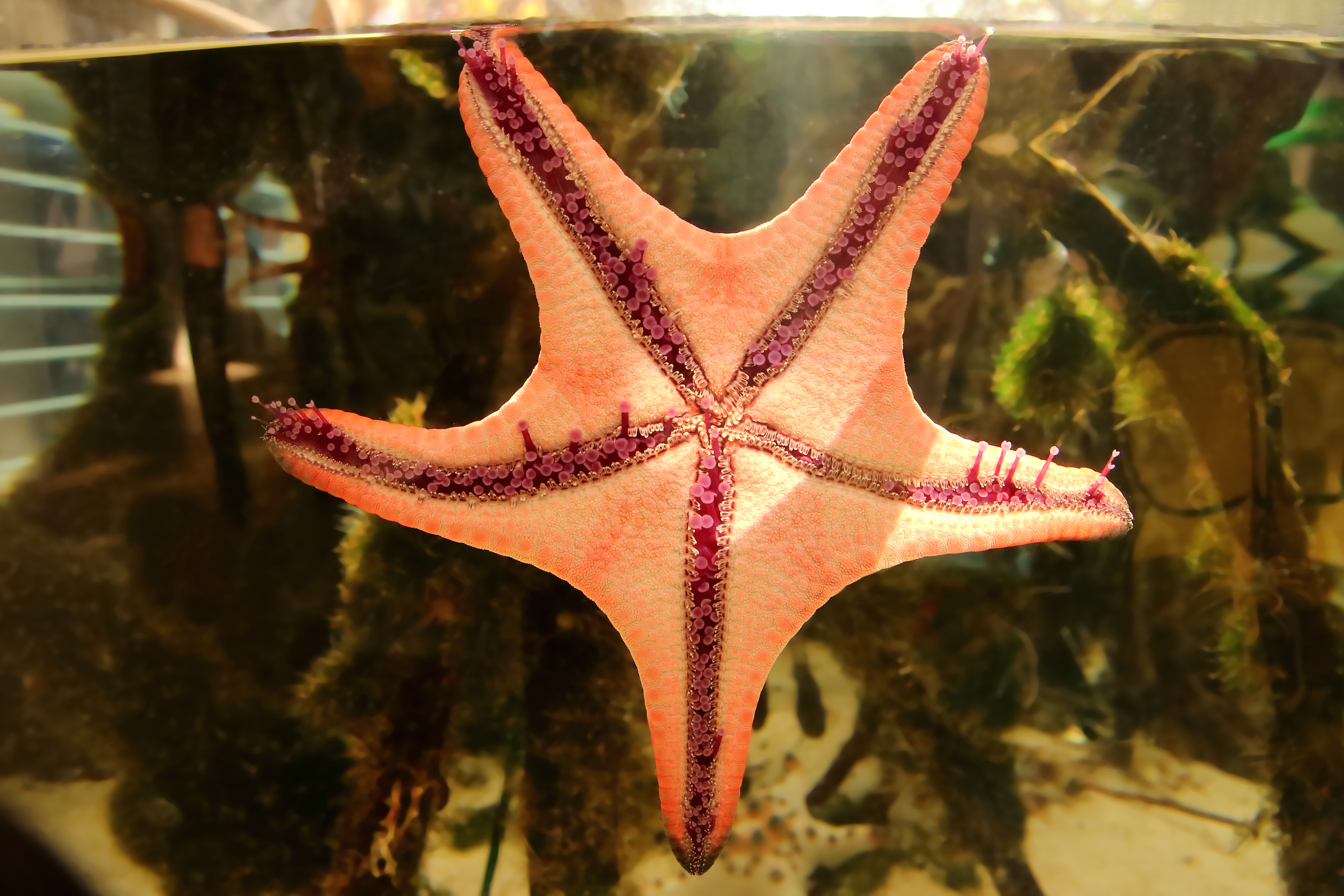
Starfish attaching to aquarium glass using tube feet.

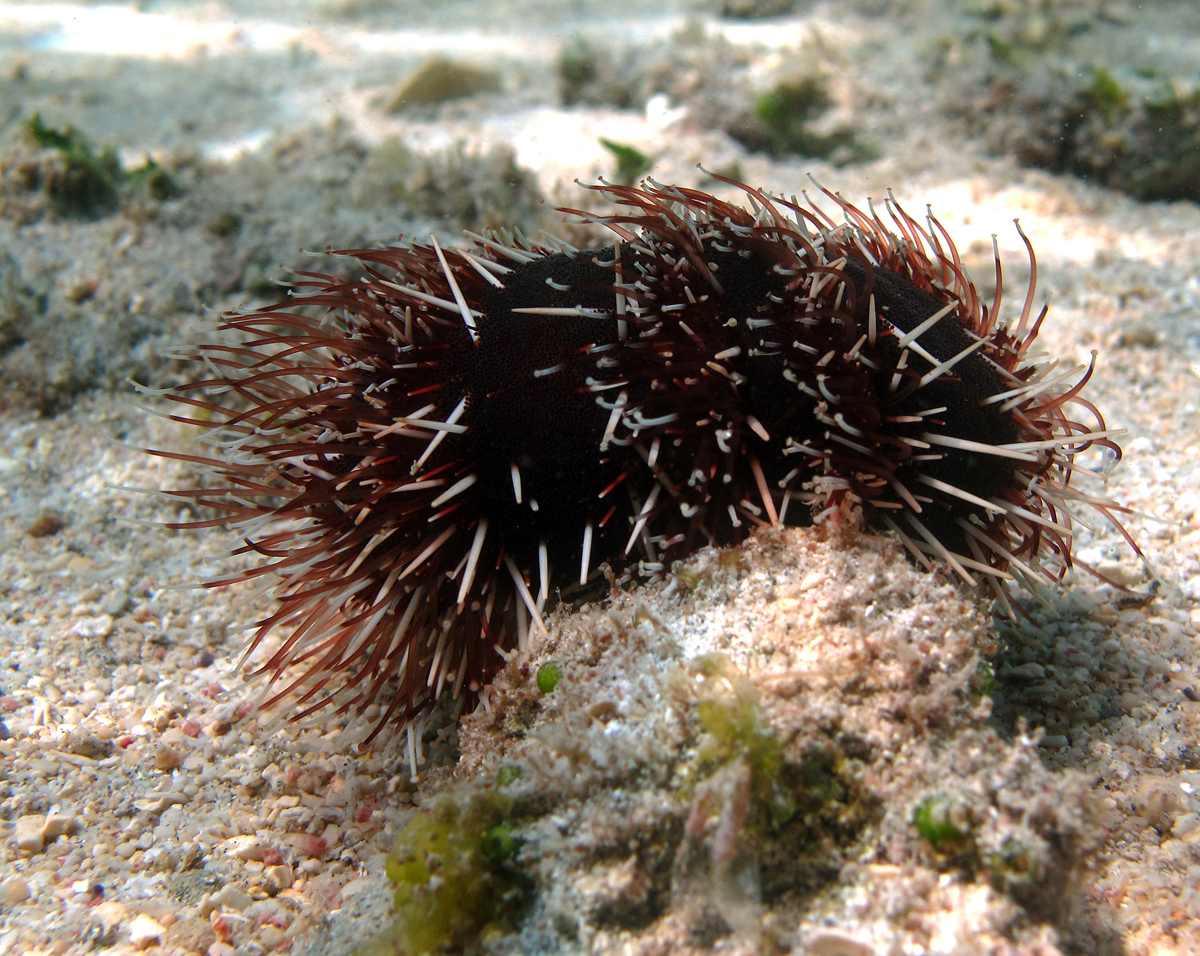
Collector urchins (Tripneustes gratilla) have elongated podia.

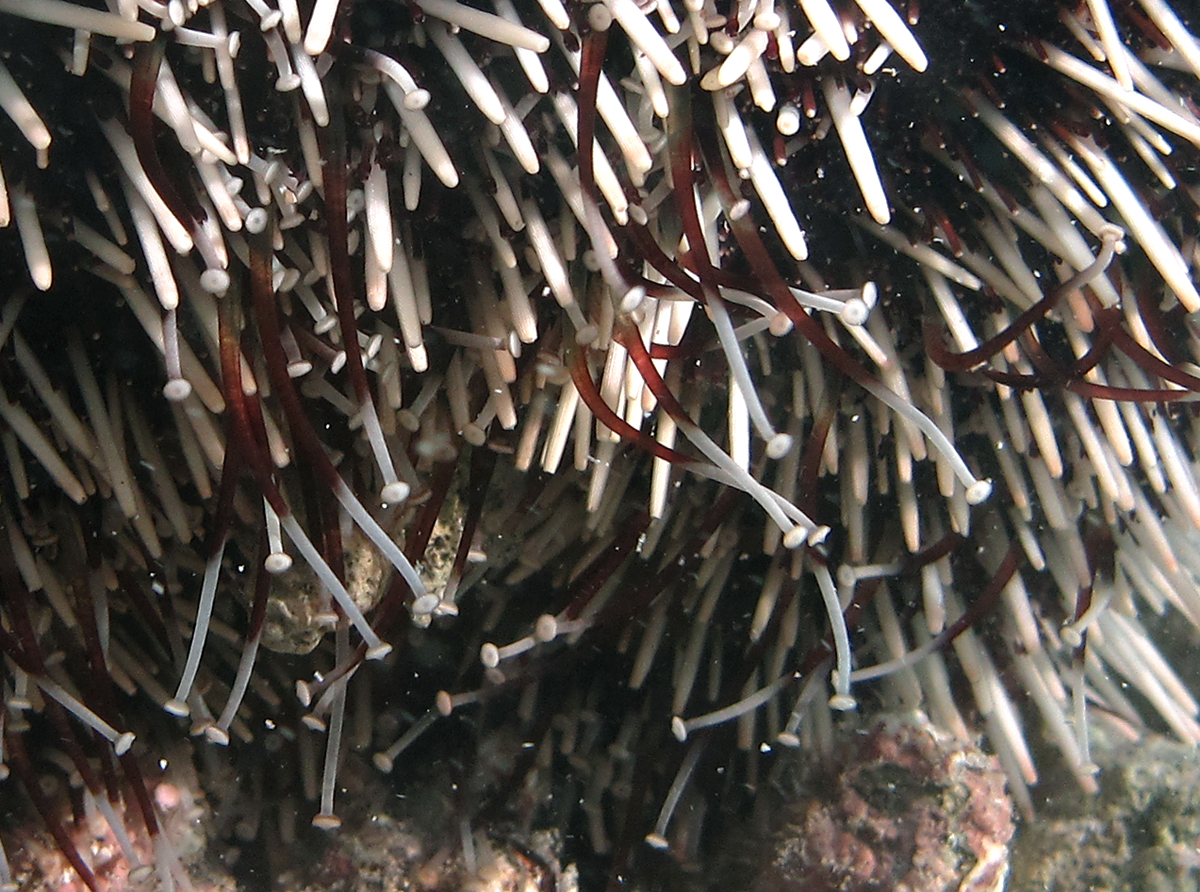
Close-up on the same specimen.

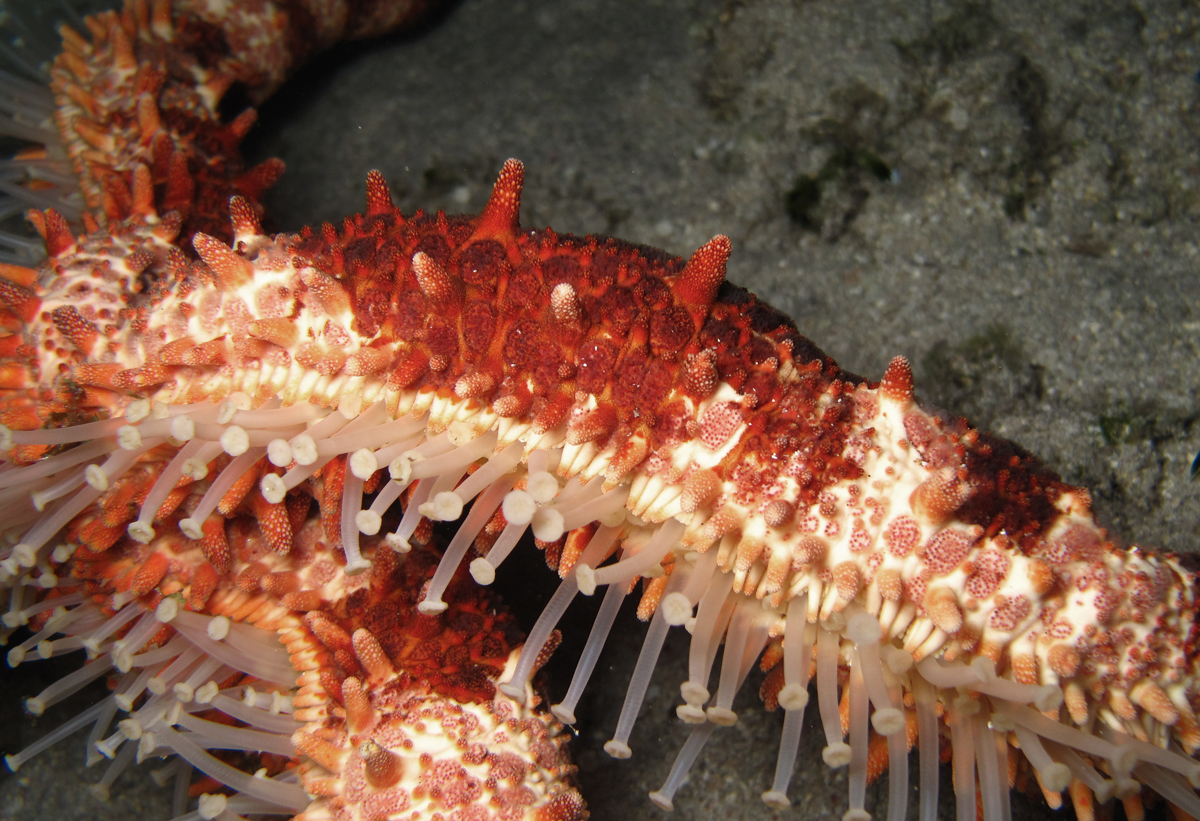
The nail starfish (Mithrodia clavigera) has particularly strong podia.

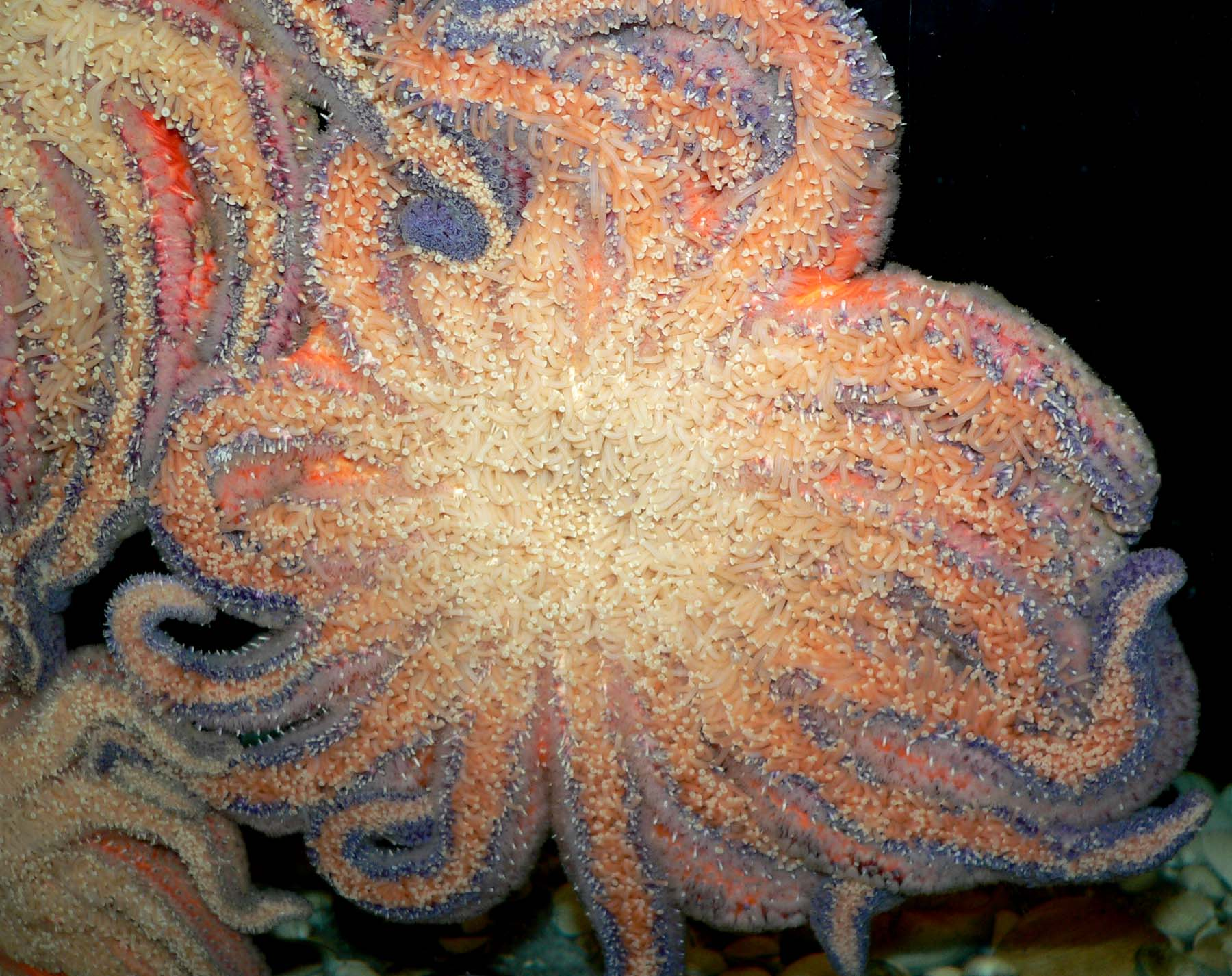
Oral face of a sunflower sea star, Pycnopodia helianthoides.

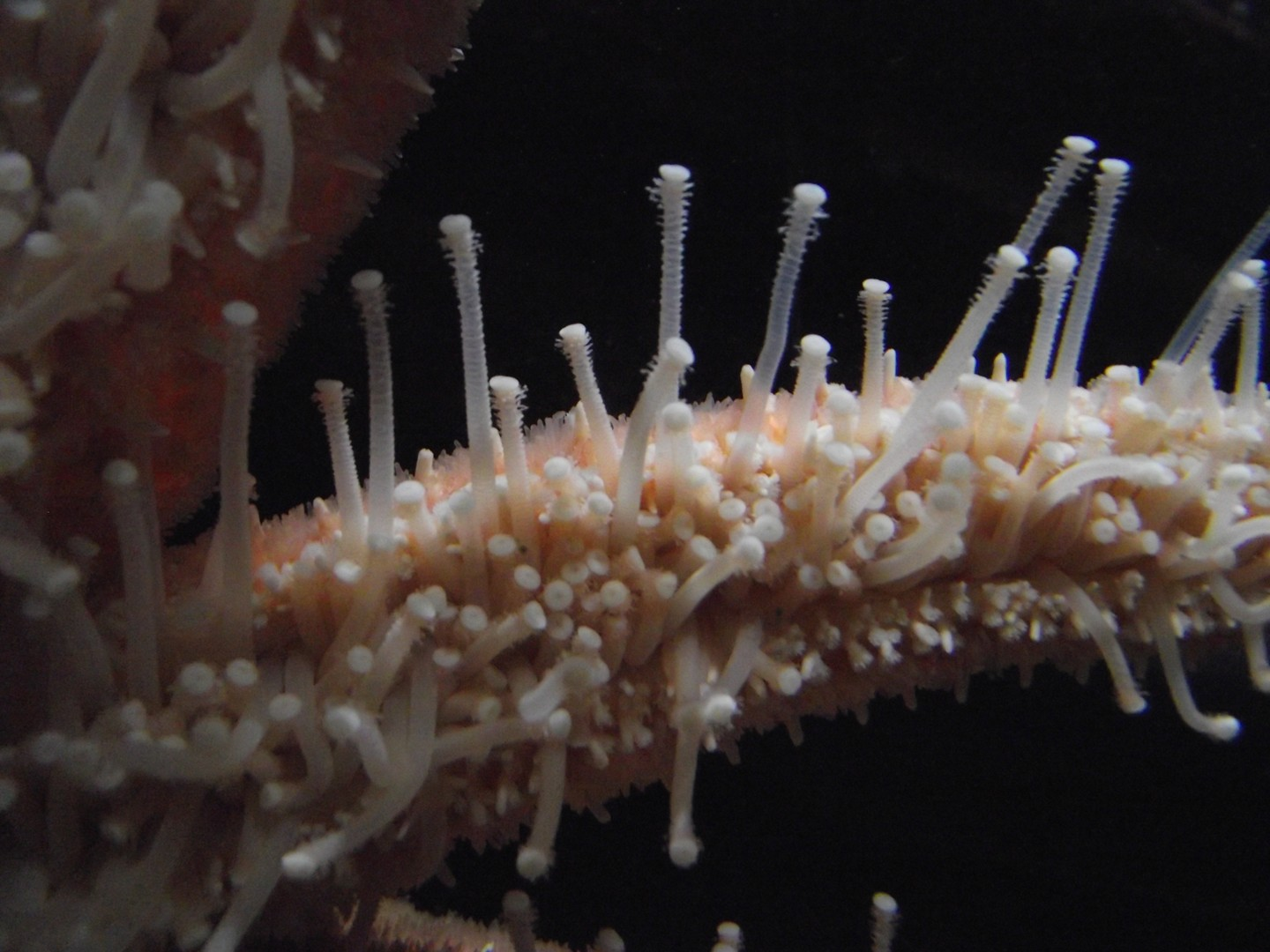
Close-up on a P. helianthoides.

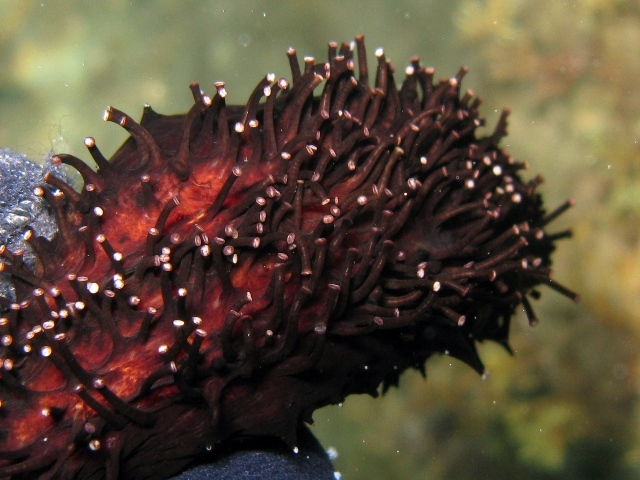
Podia of a sea cucumber (Holothuria forskali)
