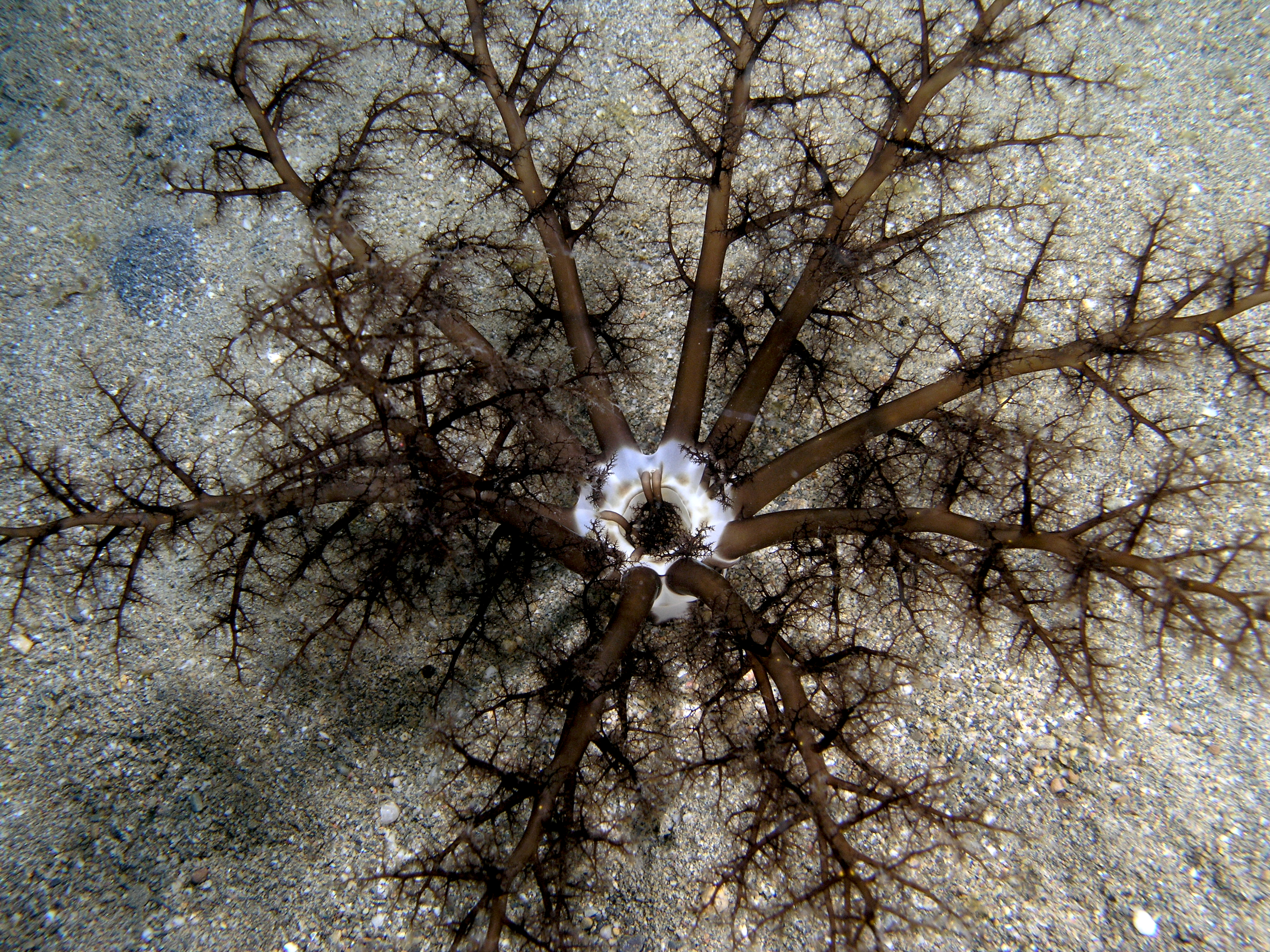
- Neothyonidium magnum

Scientific classification
- Kingdom: Animalia
- Phylum: Echinodermata
- Class: Holothuroidea
- Order: Dendrochirotida
- Family: Phyllophoridae; Östergren, 1907

Genera
- See text

= Phyllophoridae =

Family of sea cucumbers

Phyllophoridae is a family of sea cucumbers, marine invertebrates with elongated bodies, leathery skins and feeding tentacles.

Members of the family are characterised by a complex ring of calcareous ossicles arranged in a tube, making a mosaic pattern. The tentacles number ten to twenty-five. Some members have spindle-shaped bodies whilst others are buried in the substrate and adopt a U-shaped form.

== Genera ==
The following genera are recognised in the family Phyllophoridae:

- Allothyone Panning, 1949
- Anthochirus Chang, 1948
- Cladolella Heding & Panning, 1954
- Ekmanothyone Massin, 1993
- Hemithyone Pawson, 1963
- Lipotrapeza Clark, 1938
- Massinium Samyn & Thandar, 2003
- Neopentadactyla Deichmann, 1944
- Neothyonidium Deichmann, 1938
- Pentadactyla Hutton, 1878
- Pentamera Ayres, 1852
- Phyllophorella Heding & Panning, 1954
- Phyllophorus Grube, 1840
- Phyllostauros O'Loughlin in O'Loughlin, Barmos & VandenSpiegel, 2012
- Phyrella Heding & Panning, 1954
- Pseudoplacothuria Yamana & Kohtsuka, 2018
- Selenkiella Heding & Panning, 1954
- Stolus Selenka, 1867
- Thorsonia Heding, 1940
- Thyone Oken, 1815
- Thyonina Thandar, 1990
- Triasemperia O'Loughlin in O'Loughlin et al., 2014
