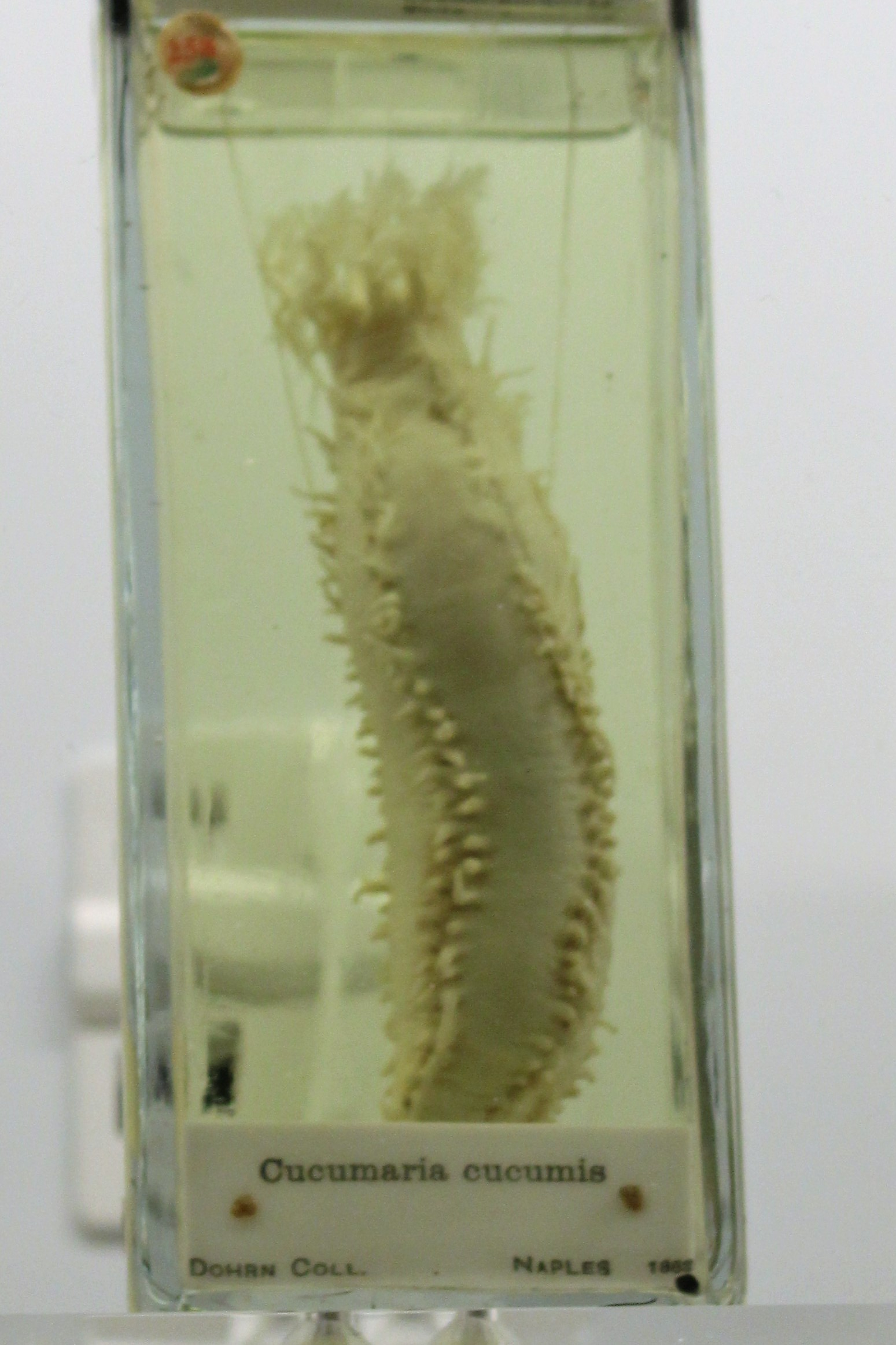

Scientific classification
- Kingdom: Animalia
- Phylum: Echinodermata
- Class: Holothuroidea
- Order: Dendrochirotida
- Family: Cucumariidae
- Genus: Paraleptopentacta
- Species: P. elongata

Binomial name
- Paraleptopentacta elongata (Düben & Koren, 1846)

Synonyms
- Cucumaria cucumis (Risso, 18??); Cucumaria elongata Düben & Koren, 1846; Cucumaria pentactes Forbes, 1841 non (Linnaeus, 1767); Holothuria fusiformis Forbes & Goodsir, 1839; Trachythyone elongata (Düben & Koren, 1846); Leptopentacta elongata (Düben & Koren, 1846)

= Paraleptopentacta elongata =

Species of sea cucumber

Paraleptopentacta elongata is a species of sea cucumber in the family Cucumariidae. It is found in the northeastern Atlantic Ocean and parts of the Mediterranean Sea. It is an infaunal species, occupying a burrow in the seabed, from which its anterior and posterior ends project.

== Description ==
Paraleptopentacta elongata is a slender, greyish-brown sea cucumber with a U-shaped, or sometimes S-shaped body, reaching a maximum length of about 10 cm (4 in). It dwells in a burrow in the sediment, with the two extremities projecting. The dorsal surface is covered with darker brown or grey, conical projections. In small specimens, the ventral surface bears five longitudinal rows of tube feet, and in larger specimens, it bears five double rows. The cuticle is leathery, stiffened by numerous smooth ossicles, small irregular perforated plates which form part of the body wall. The mouth, at the anterior end, is surrounded by a ring of tentacles, eight being large and much-branched, with the two on the ventral side being short and forked. The anus is at the posterior end of the body.

== Distribution and habitat ==
This sea cucumber is native to the northeastern Atlantic Ocean, the North Sea and the Mediterranean Sea. Its range extends from Norway to Morocco, and it occurs on sandy and muddy seabeds at depths down to about 110 m (360 ft).

== Ecology ==
Paraleptopentacta elongata is considered as a suspension feeder by some sources, consuming diatoms, single-cell algae and organic particles, as well as zooplankton, such as copepods, ostracods, protozoans, nematodes, jellyfish and larvae. It uses its eight feeding tentacles to gather particles, each shrinking and bending, in an apparently random order, to transfer the food to the mouth. The two ventral tentacles are used in coordination with the other tentacles, being folded around the feeding tentacles so that the forks scrape off the food fragments when the larger tentacles are withdrawn from the mouth; in some other sea cucumbers with similar feeding habits, such as Pawsonia saxicola, the forked tentacles seem to act entirely independently and do not coordinate their actions with the larger tentacles.

However, another work tends to prove that Paraleptopentacta elongata is a deposit feeder, living burrowed in sediment with only a short portion of its aboral end protruding. The belief of its suspension feeding life style could come from misinterpretation of observations where specimens were seen emerging from the sand and moving their tentacles in a manner suggesting feeding and from the occasional presence of mucus on the tentacles, understood as particles catching tool. In this work, the author reports a two weeks period during which none of the observed specimens emerged from the substratum but they produced faecal pellets near the burrow openings, indicating the feeding occurs beneath the sediment.

This sea cucumber can hibernate in the winter. In preparation for this, and perhaps in preparation for reproduction, it accumulates and stores lipid droplets in the enterocytes in the lining of the gut.
