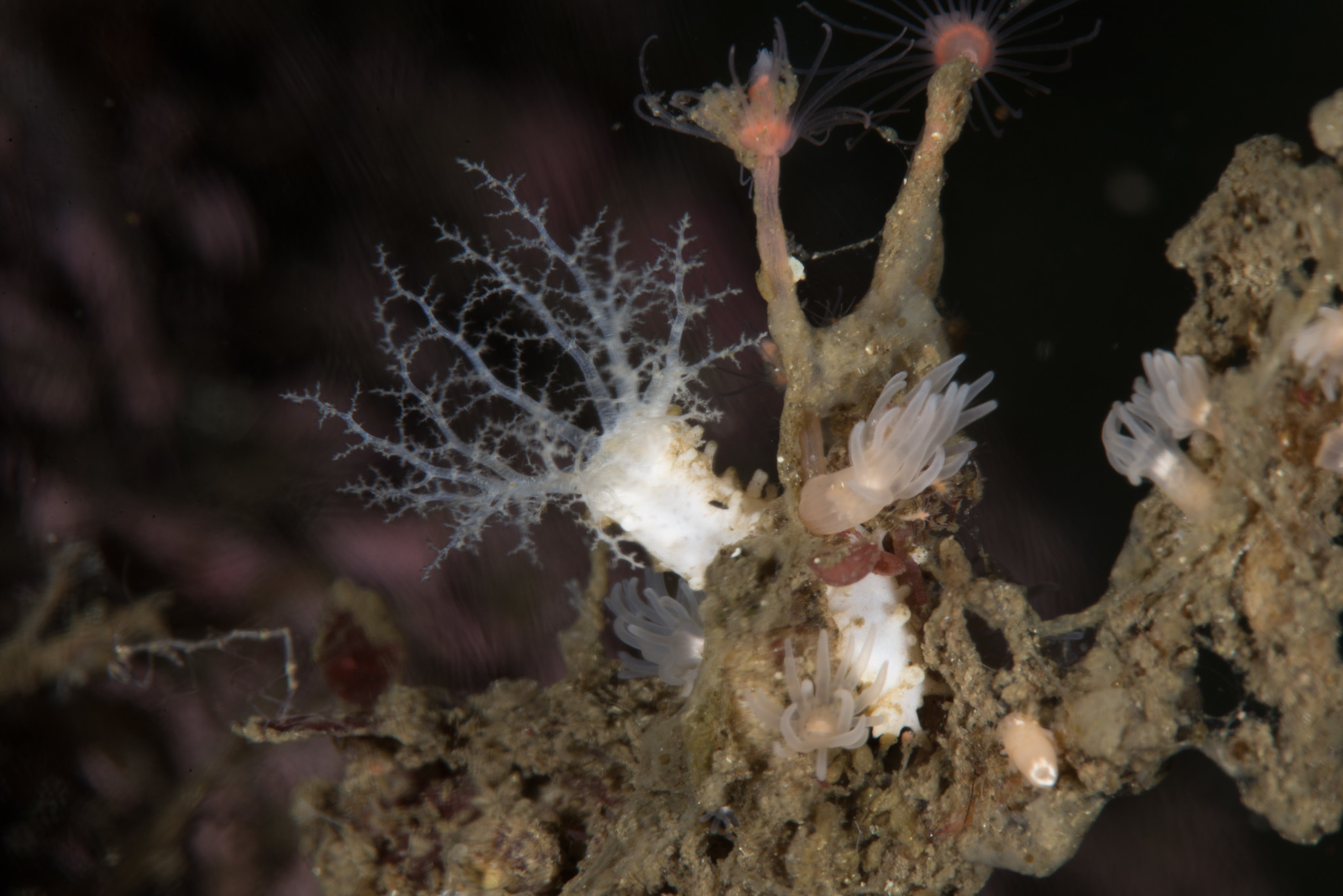

Conservation status
- Not evaluated (IUCN 3.1)

Scientific classification
- Kingdom: Animalia
- Phylum: Echinodermata
- Class: Holothuroidea
- Order: Dendrochirotida
- Family: Cucumariidae
- Genus: Ocnus
- Species: O. lacteus

Binomial name
- Ocnus lacteus Forbes and Goodsir, 1839

Synonyms
- Holothuria lactea Forbes & Goodsir, 1839; Cucumaria lactea (Forbes, 1839)

= Ocnus lacteus =

Species of sea cucumber

Ocnus lacteus is a species of sea cucumber in the family Cucumariidae.

== Description ==
Ocnus lacteus is 1–4 cm (0.39–1.57 in) long. It crawls on rocks at shallow depths, using five rows of long tube feet. At the head are ten branching tentacles for catching food. It is white (hence the specific name lacteus, "milky"), with numerous spicules that each contain four holes.

== Reproduction ==
Ocnus lacteus are gonochoric and each individual has only one gonad. Spawning and fertilization are external; some exhibit brooding. Embryos develop into planktotrophic larvae (auricularia) then into doliolaria (barrel-shaped) which later metamorphose into juvenile sea cucumbers.

== Distribution and habitat ==
It is found in western Ireland. It lives in northerly waters from the Arctic to the Mediterranean. It lives at depths up to 200 m (660 ft), living on the seafloor and crawling over algae and seaweed.
