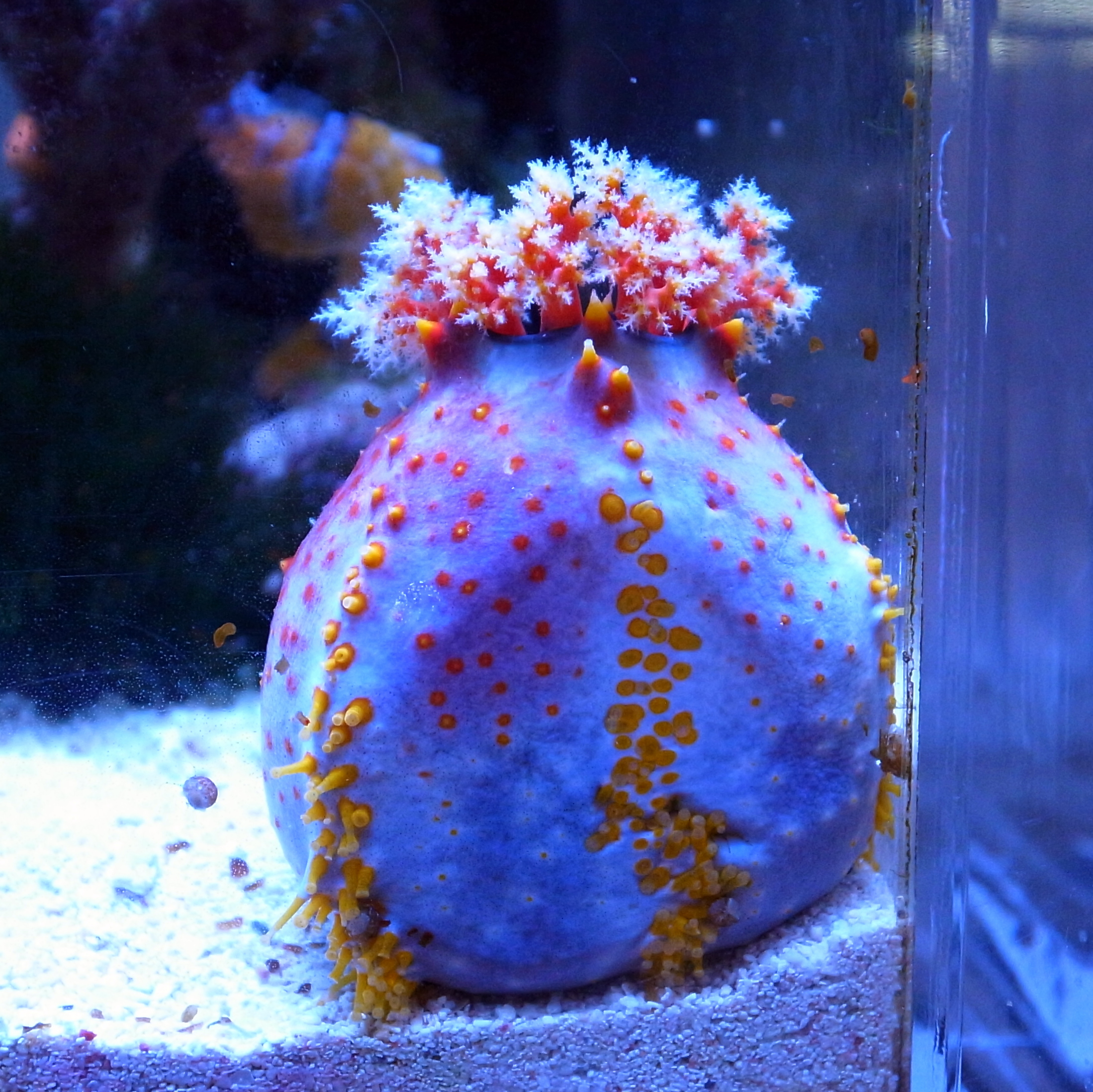

Scientific classification
- Kingdom: Animalia
- Phylum: Echinodermata
- Class: Holothuroidea
- Order: Dendrochirotida
- Family: Cucumariidae
- Genus: Pseudocolochirus
- Species: P. axiologus

Binomial name
- Pseudocolochirus axiologus (H. L. Clark, 1914)

Synonyms
- Colochirus axiologus Clark, 1914

= Pseudocolochirus axiologus =

Species of sea apple

Pseudocolochirus axiologus, the Australian sea apple, is a species of sea apple within the family Cucumariidae. The species is found distributed in marine waters north of Australia, occurring near and in areas such as the Coral Sea, Northern Territory, Queensland, and Western Australia. Habitats include waters 19 to 200 meters below sea level in neritic zones. Individuals reach lengths of 22 to 26 centimeters, with body colorations of light to dark blue with red feet and tentacles colored violet, blue, and red with white tips. The species feeds through filter feeding, catching organic matter such as algae, phytoplankton, and detritus with its tentacles. It is occasionally kept in saltwater tanks in the aquarium hobby, however is recommended to only be cared by those with expertise in the hobby due to a risk of it secreting toxins if stressed, such as with some fish species that are prone to pick at the tentacles of sea cucumbers.
