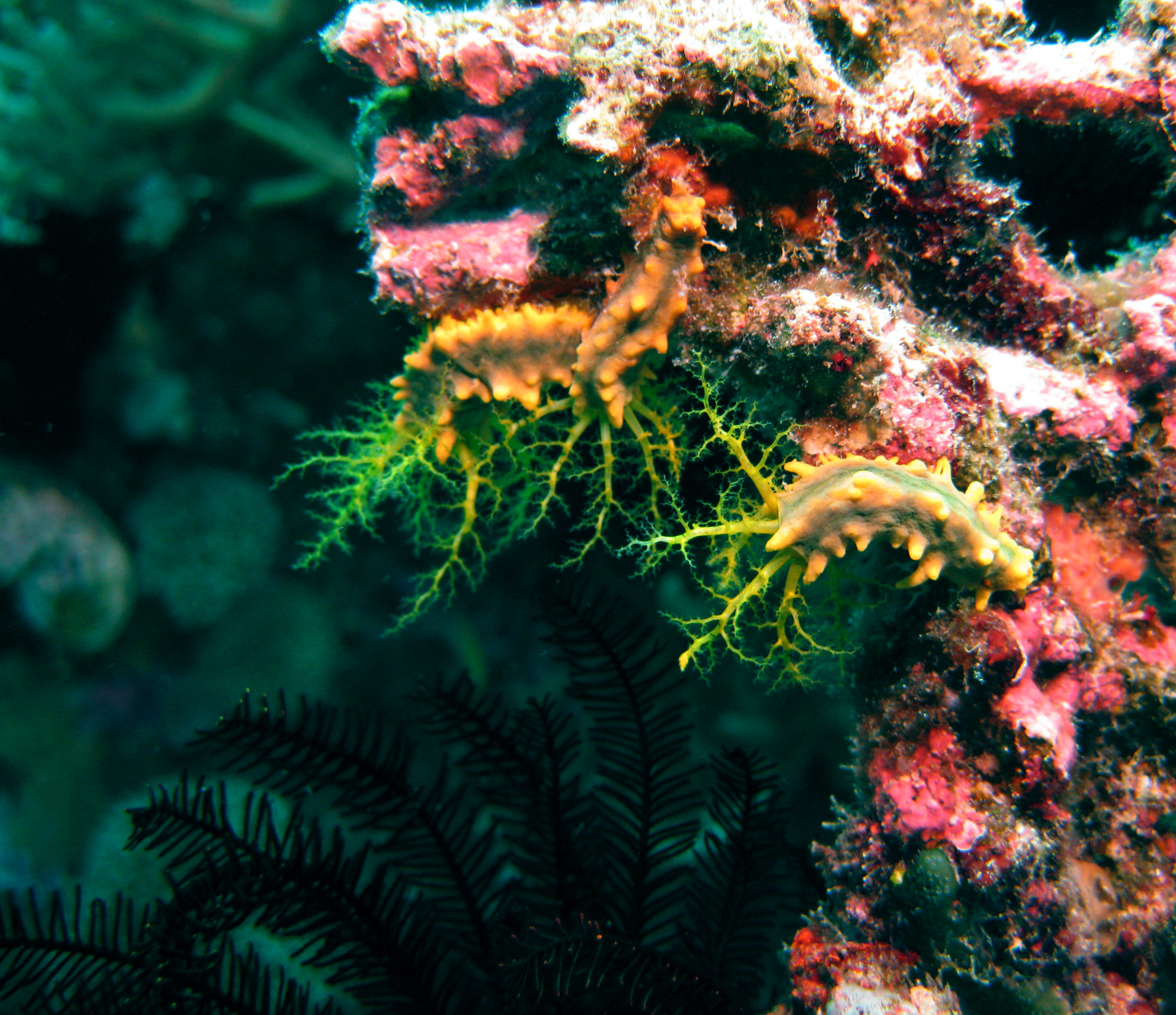

Scientific classification
- Kingdom: Animalia
- Phylum: Echinodermata
- Class: Holothuroidea
- Order: Dendrochirotida
- Family: Cucumariidae
- Genus: Colochirus
- Species: C. quadrangularis

Binomial name
- Colochirus quadrangularis Troschel, 1846

Synonyms
- List: Colochirus coeruleus Semper, 1867; Colochirus jagorii Semper, 1867; Colochirus tristis Ludwig, 1875; Pentacta coerulea var. rubra Clark, 1938; Pentacta jagorii (Semper, 1868); Pentacta quadrangularis; Pentacta tristis (Ludwig, 1875)

= Colochirus quadrangularis =

Species of sea cucumber

Colochirus quadrangularis, commonly known as the thorny sea cucumber, is a species of sea cucumber in the family Cucumariidae. It is found in shallow seas in tropical parts of the Indo-Pacific region.

== Description ==
Colochirus quadrangularis is a moderate sized sea cucumber growing to about 10 cm (4 in) in length. The roughly cylindrical body has four longitudinal ridges giving it a square cross section and a flat base. It has irregular, thornlike, soft projections called papillae lying along these ridges. The leathery body wall is reinforced by calcareous spike-like structures which in this species include basket-shaped spicules and perforated ellipsoids. There is a ring of large, branched feeding tentacles round the mouth. There are three rows of red tube feet on the underside and the body tapers at the posterior end, the anus being surrounded by 5 tooth-like projections. The colour is mainly grey often with pink on the ridges and thorns, and with yellow or reddish tentacles.

Colochirus quadrangularis can be confused with the rather similar pink warty sea cucumber (Cercodemas anceps) but the body of the latter is covered in low, warty protuberances rather than thorny projections.

== Distribution ==
Colochirus quadrangularis is found in the tropical Indo-Pacific region at depths down to about 115 metres (377 ft). Its range extends from East Africa and Madagascar to Malaysia and northern Australia. In Singapore it has unexplained population swings, sometimes being abundant and at other times scarce.

== Biology ==
Colochirus quadrangularis is usually found on the seabed where it clings to seagrass, tube worm cases or other projections with its tube feet. It is a suspension feeder, rearing up its anterior end up and spreading its feathery tentacles to catch phytoplankton and other organic particles. The tentacles are then retracted one by one and the mouthparts scrape off the food particles. It often has transparent, and almost invisible, commensal shrimps (Periclimenes sp.) living among its tentacles and on its body wall.

== Uses ==
Colochirus quadrangularis is collected for the aquarium trade but it is difficult to keep in a reef aquarium because of its specialist feeding requirements.
