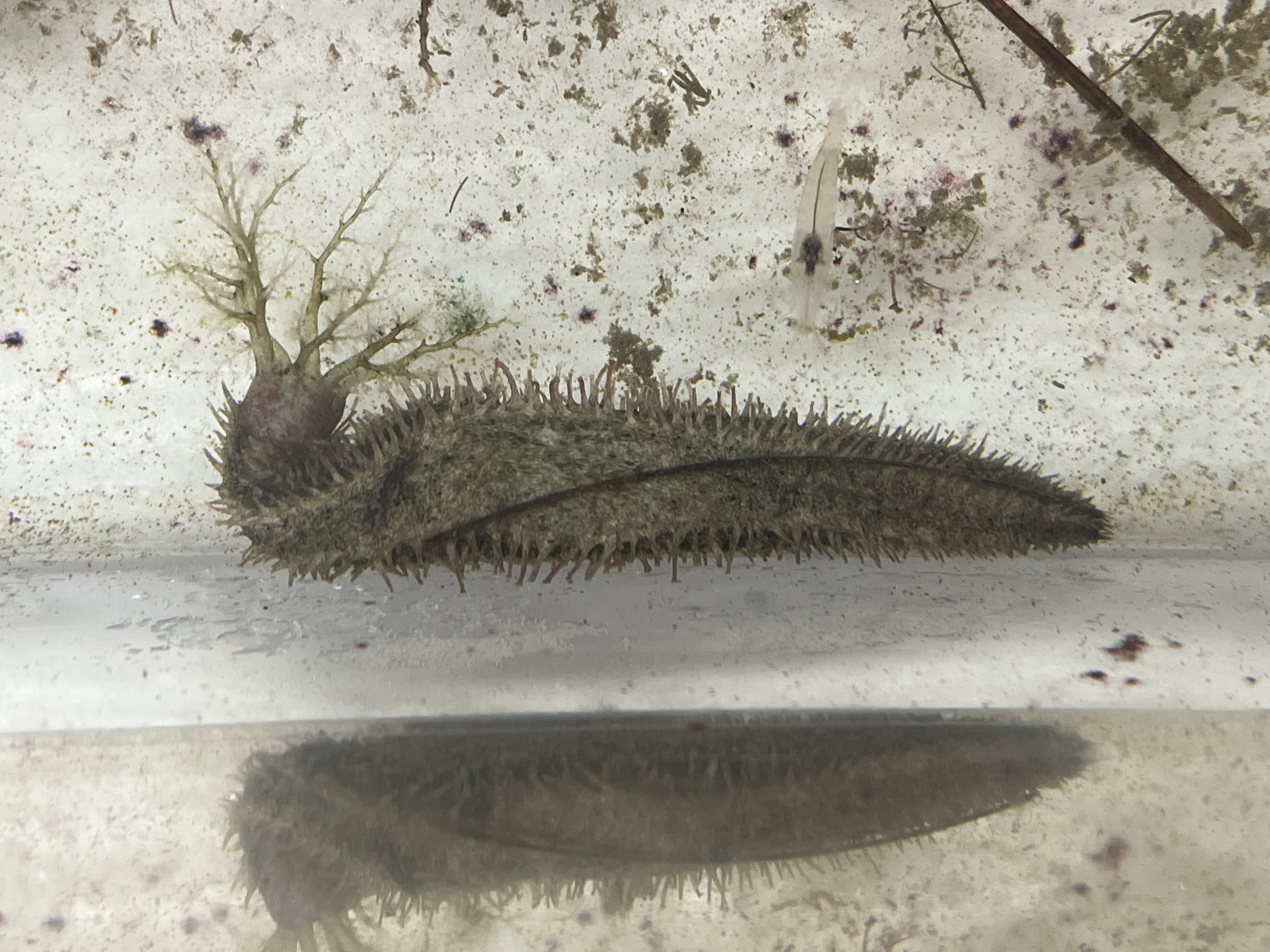

Scientific classification
- Kingdom: Animalia
- Phylum: Echinodermata
- Class: Holothuroidea
- Order: Dendrochirotida
- Family: Cucumariidae
- Genus: Thyonella
- Species: T. gemmata

Binomial name
- Thyonella gemmata Pourtalès, 1851

= Thyonella gemmata =

Species of sea cucumber

Thyonella gemmata, the green sea cucumber or striped sea cucumber, is a marine Holothurian of the family Cucumariidae within the genus Thyonella. They are most common along the East Coast of the U.S., but their presence ranges from North Atlantic to Yucatán Peninsula, with occurrences on the West coast of the U.S. Usually they are green to black in color, vermiform, and 8–15 cm in length. They inhabit U-shaped burrows 0–6 m in depth, and both deposit and filter feed. They contain hemoglobin and exhibit biomedical properties, including against SARS-CoV-2. They have a complex digestive system and demonstrate regenerative abilities. They are gonochoristic, undergo metamorphosis, and externally fertilize.

== Description ==
Green sea cucumbers range from 8 cm when relaxed up to 15 cm when extended. They exhibit a range of colors including green, mottled gray, brown, and black. They have a vermiform shape, swollen in the middle and tapered at the ends. They have thick, papillate, rigid skin with ossicles of knotted buttons, shallow cups, and perforated plates. Tentacles are present around the mouth, and numerous cylindrical tube feet or podia surround the body.

== Habitat and burrows ==
They are mostly found in the Atlantic, commonly along the Eastern Coast of the U.S. from Massachusetts to Florida, but can also be found on the West Coast. They are also common in the Gulf of Mexico, Cuba, and Yucatán Peninsula, and are especially common in Folly Beach, South Carolina.

They inhabit U-shaped burrows in muddy to sandy areas, usually near seagrasses, along shore to a depth of 6 m. Burrows are made by contracting muscles within the body wall and using the podia to remove sediment. At each end of the burrow, the mouth and anus are left exposed to facilitate in waste disposal and feeding. When disturbed, they will recess deeper into the burrow and become rigid.

Grain size and salinity both play a role in burrow formation. Larger grain sizes (1 to 2 mm) caused burrow formation to take two hours longer than what was observed for smaller grain sizes, and prevented disturbed sea cucumbers from burrowing any deeper. Decreased salinity from normal (29.2-31.9 ppt) to brackish (20 ppt) significantly disrupted burrowing behavior. Temperature and high salinity (40 ppt) are observed to have no effect on burrow behavior.

== Feeding ==
These sea cucumbers participate in both deposit and filter feeding. They participate in bioturbation, the releasing of CaCO_{3}, promoting coral reef ecosystems. As such, they are used as a bioindicator species, along with other sea cucumbers, specifically for trace metal pollution.

== Hemoglobin and biomedical properties ==
Hemoglobin is present in the red blood cells of the coelomic fluid and water-vascular system. The hemoglobin for T. gemmata is dimeric and shows cooperative binding properties with both oxygen and carbon monoxide (CO), although affinity for CO is much lower as it demonstrates one of the slowest CO association rates. Their hemoglobin undergoes a conformational change upon exchange of oxygen for CO wherein a tryptophan is moved — thus creating a difference in HbCO and HbO_{2} conformations. Oxygen disassociation from hemoglobin is biphasic and occurs at different rates in each part of the hemoglobin, occurring five, times faster for singly oxygenated hemoglobin.

Like many echinoderms, T. gemmata contain marine sulfated glycosaminoglycans (GAGs) within the connective tissue of the dermis which function to stiffen the body. These marine sulfated GAGs can disrupt the initial binding complex formed to initiate infection of SARS-CoV-2. There is concern of the anticoagulant effects of marine sulfated GAGs, but one polysaccharide present within T. gemmata, sulfated fucan (TgSF) showed high anti-SARS-CoV-2 and low anticoagulant properties, specifically for wild type and delta strains. TgSF also showed high binding affinity for the omicron variant, but in vitro analysis is needed to determine effectiveness against it.

== Internal anatomy ==
The digestive system contains six regions: pharynx, esophagus, stomach, connector between stomach and intestine, intestine, and large intestine. The digestive system is intimately associated with the calcareous lantern, as this is where the digestive system is connected to the outside, and it supports the systems that aid in feeding. When the lantern is removed, these sea cucumbers show a complete regeneration of it from posterior fragments through a process of reorganization and cellular proliferation.

Calcium promotes crosslinks within the connective tissue of the body wall between proteoglycan and collagen, causing skin tightness and stiffness. Sodium interrupts these crosslinks and causes swelling of the connective tissue. When present in conjunction, a Ca^{2+}/Na^{+} ratio at or above 0.40 does not result in swelling.

They exhibit monociliated, psuedostratified, myoepithelial coelomic lining within tube feet.

== Reproduction and development ==
Like other members of Holothuroidea, they are gonochoristic, with external fertilization. They demonstrate auricularia and doliolaria larvae before metamorphosing into juvenile sea cucumbers.
