= Stereoderma =

Stereoderma may refer to two different genera:

- Stereoderma (echinoderm), a genus of sea cucumbers in the family Cucumariidae
- Stereoderma (plant), a synonym for Olea, a genus of plants
