= C. echinata =

C. echinata may refer to:

- Caesalpinia echinata, the brazilwood, pau-Brasil or pernambuco, a Brazilian timber tree species
- Carex echinata, the star sedge or little prickly sedge, a plant species native to North and Central America and parts of Eurasia
- Cucumaria echinata, a sea cucumber species found in the Bay of Bengal

== See also ==
- Echinata
