= Aslia =

Scientific classification
- Kingdom: Animalia
- Phylum: Echinodermata
- Class: Holothuroidea
- Order: Dendrochirotida
- Family: Cucumariidae
- Genus: Aslia; Rowe, 1970

Genus of sea cucumbers

Aslia is a genus of echinoderms belonging to the family Cucumariidae.

The species of this genus are found in the coasts of Atlantic Ocean.

Species:

- Aslia forbesi (Bell, 1886)
- Aslia lefevrii (Barrois, 1882)
- Aslia pygmaea (Théel, 1886)
- Aslia sanctijohannis (Bell, 1887)
- Aslia spyridophora (Clark, 1923)
