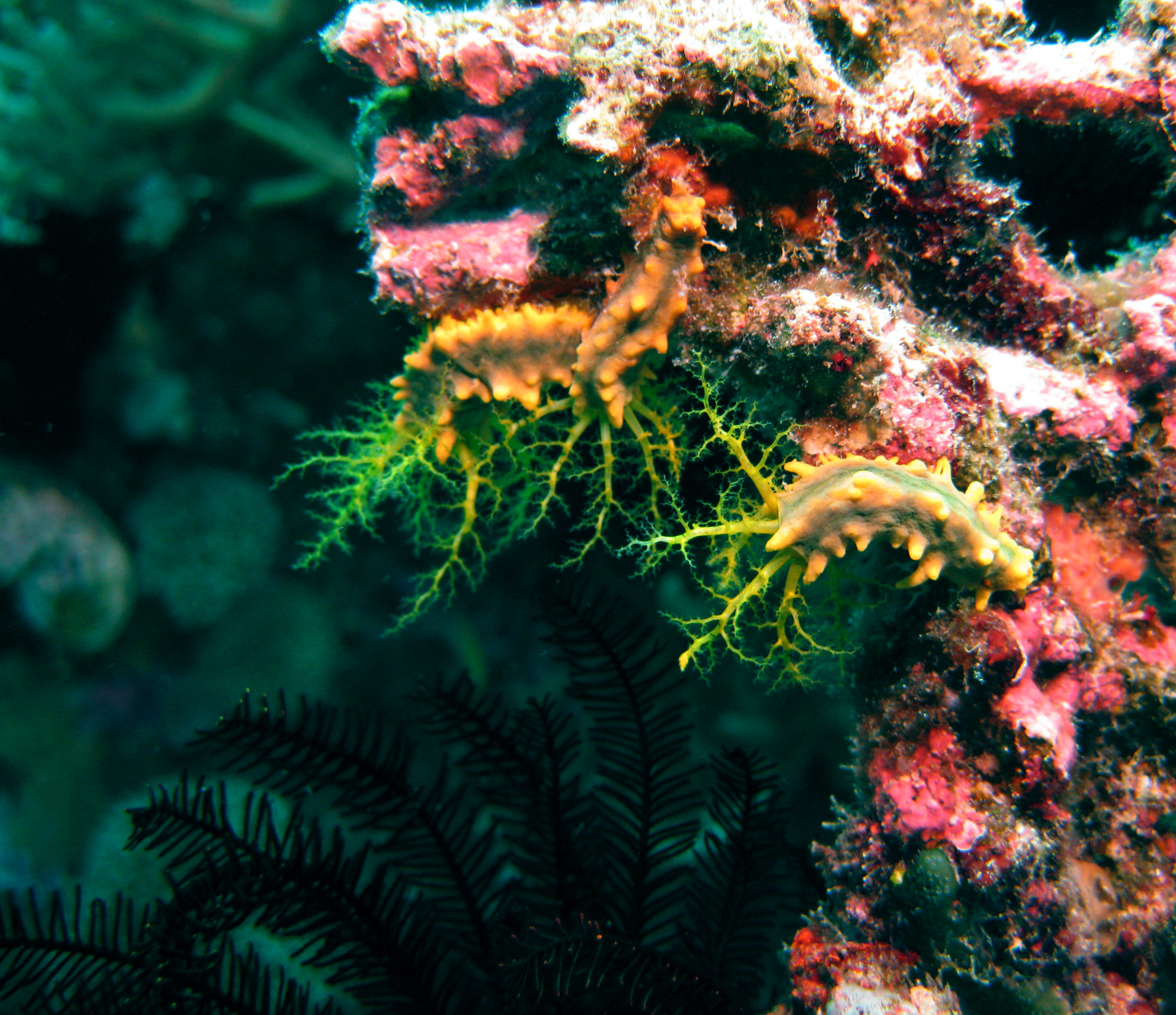
- Colochirus quadrangularis

Scientific classification
- Kingdom: Animalia
- Phylum: Echinodermata
- Class: Holothuroidea
- Order: Dendrochirotida
- Family: Cucumariidae
- Genus: Colochirus; Troschel, 1846

Species
- See text

= Colochirus =

Genus of sea cucumbers

Colochirus is a genus of sea cucumbers in the family Cucumariidae.

== Species ==
The World Register of Marine Species lists the following species:

- Colochirus crassus Ekman, 1918
- Colochirus cylindricus Semper, 1867
- Colochirus pusillus Helfer, 1912
- Colochirus quadrangularis Troschel, 1846
- Colochirus robustus Östergren, 1898
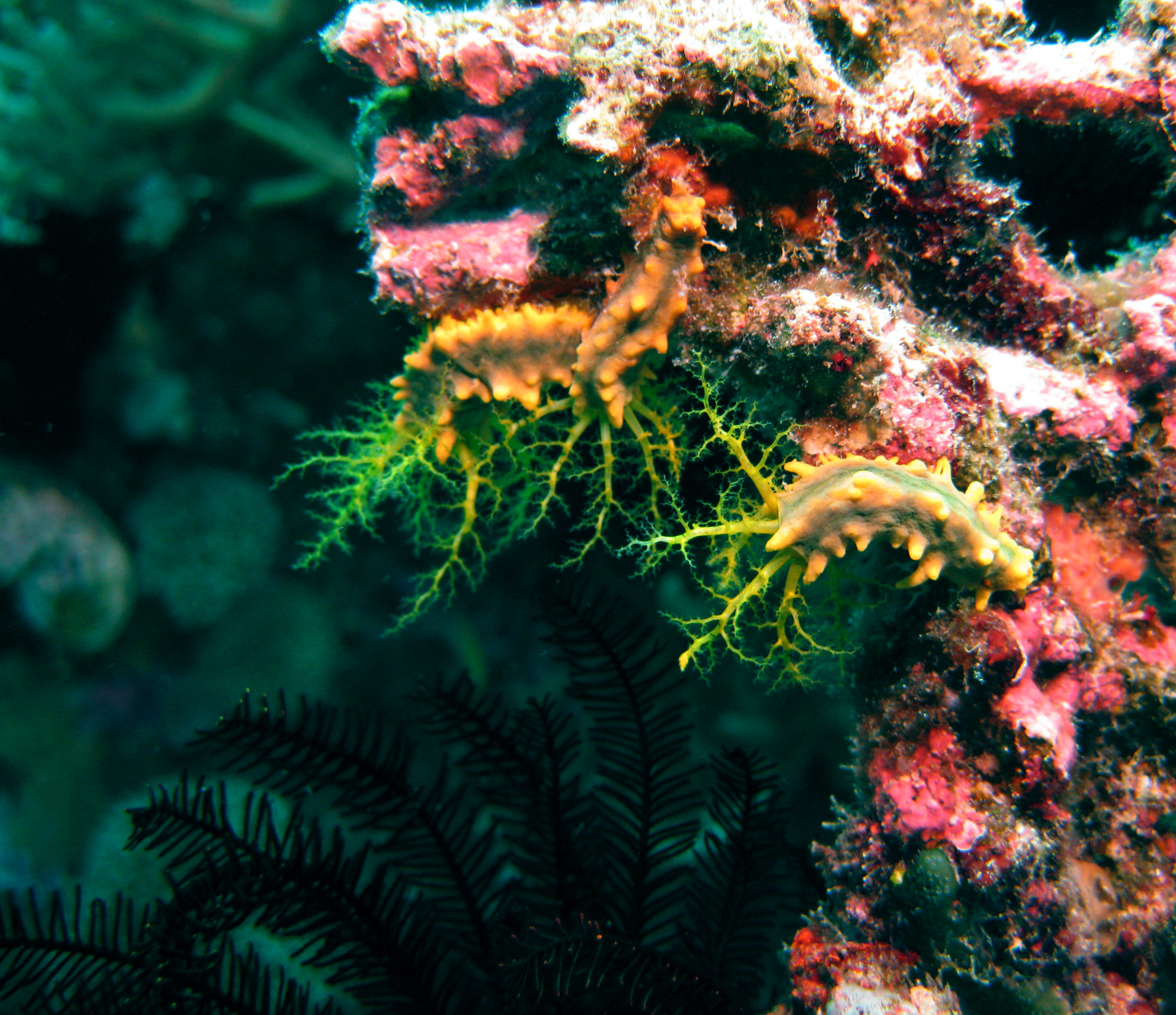
Colochirus quadrangularis

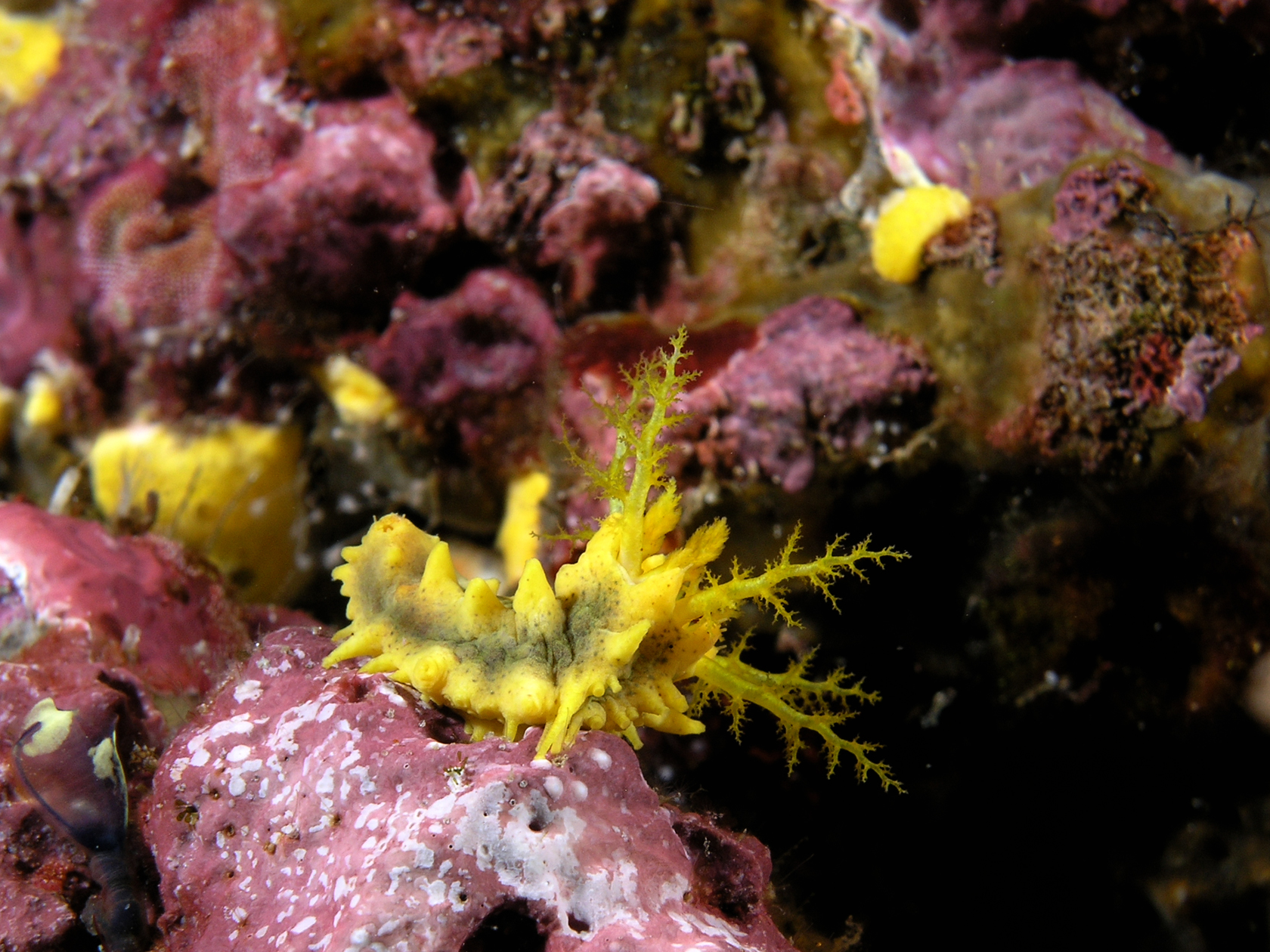
Colochirus robustus
