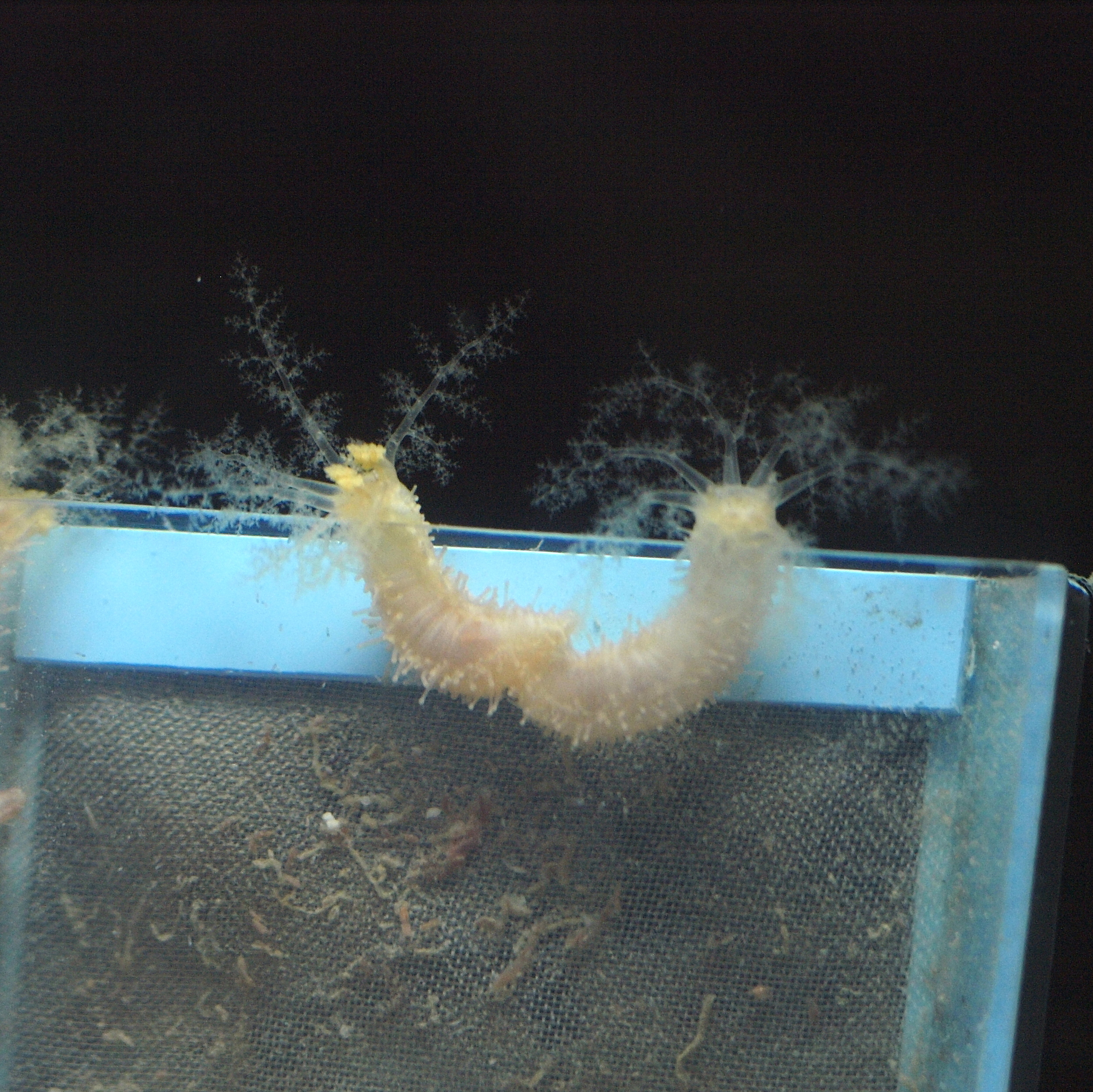

Scientific classification
- Domain: Eukaryota
- Kingdom: Animalia
- Phylum: Echinodermata
- Class: Holothuroidea
- Order: Dendrochirotida
- Family: Cucumariidae
- Genus: Pseudocnus
- Species: P. echinatus

Binomial name
- Pseudocnus echinatus (von Marenzeller, 1881)

Synonyms
- Cucumaria echinata von Marenzeller, 1881

= Pseudocnus echinatus =

Species of sea cucumber

Pseudocnus echinatus is a species of sea cucumber in the family Cucumariidae. It is found in the Indo-Pacific from the Red Sea and Bay of Bengal to China and Japan.

== Biology ==
Nearly all sea cucumbers are dioecious, with males and females being indistinguishable externally. Spawning takes place in this species between mid-June and early August, usually in the late afternoon. The gametes are liberated into the water column and fertilisation takes place at once. The larvae are planktonic at first before settling on the seabed, growing feeding tentacles and metamorphosing into juvenile sea cucumbers.

== Research ==
Pseudocnus echinatus has been researched as a possible source of bioactive molecules and has been found to contain a galactose-specific lectin with haemolytic activity. This binds to the exterior of red blood cells, damaging the cell membrane and causing lysis. This lectin has the ability to block the development of Plasmodium, the causal agent of malaria, when it is expressed in genetically modified Anopheles mosquitoes.
