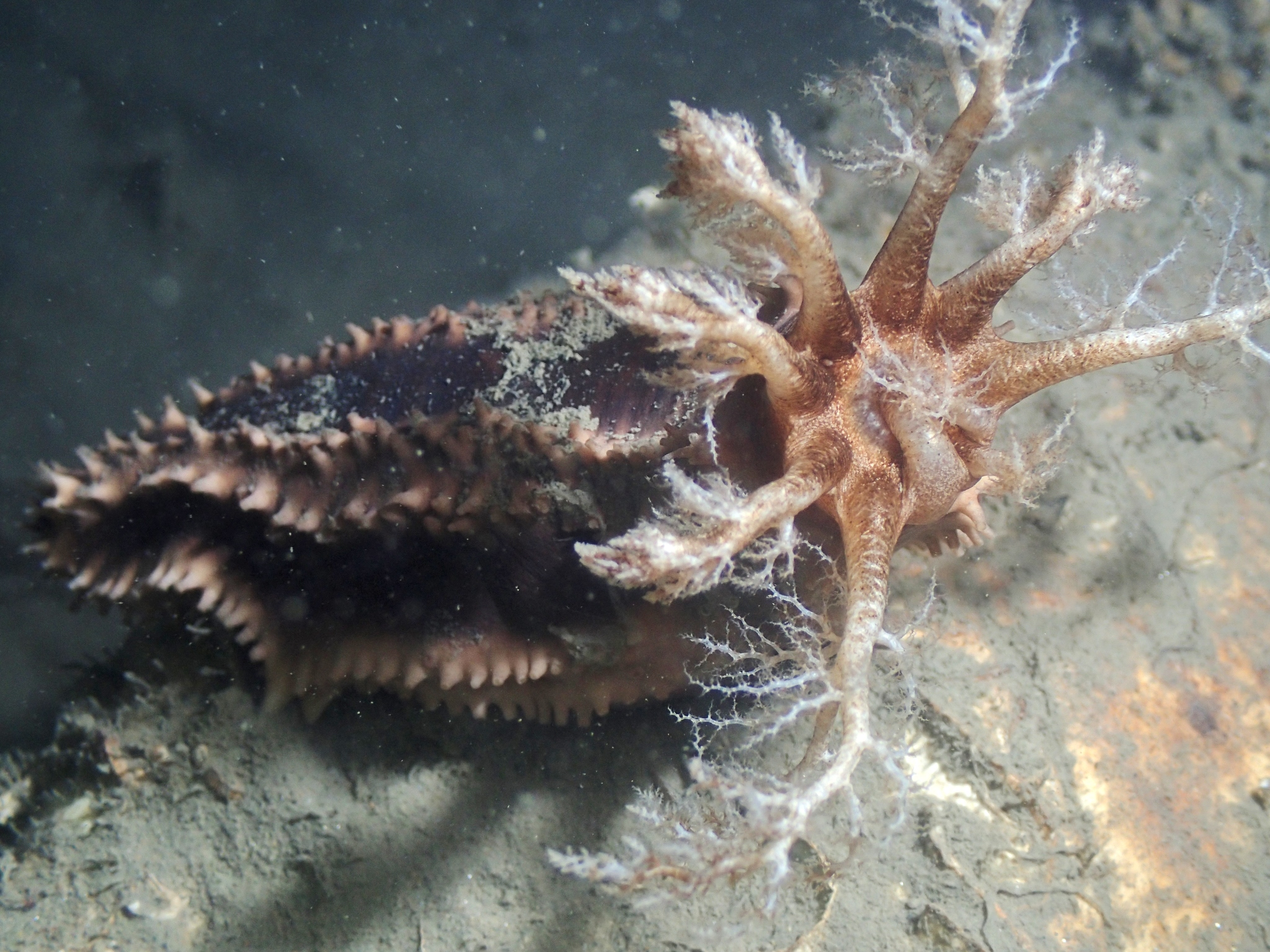
- Ocnus planci

Scientific classification
- Kingdom: Animalia
- Phylum: Echinodermata
- Class: Holothuroidea
- Order: Dendrochirotida
- Family: Cucumariidae
- Genus: Ocnus; Forbes & Goodsir in Forbes, 1841

Species
- See text

Synonyms
- Pentacucumis Deichmann, 1957

= Ocnus (echinoderm) =

Genus of echinoderms

Ocnus is a genus of sea cucumbers in the family Cucumariidae.

== Species ==
The following species are recognised in the genus Ocnus:

- Ocnus amiculus Cherbonnier, 1988
- Ocnus braziliensis (Verrill, 1868)
- Ocnus brunneus (Forbes in Thompson, 1840)
- Ocnus capensis (Théel, 1886)
- Ocnus cataphractus (Sluiter, 1901)
- Ocnus corbulus (Cherbonnier, 1953)
- Ocnus cruciformis Thandar in Thandar & Mjobo, 2014
- Ocnus cylindricus Semper, 1867
- Ocnus diomedeae Pawson, 1976
- Ocnus glacialis (Ljungman, 1879)
- Ocnus lacteus (Forbes & Goodsir, 1839)
- Ocnus paracorbulus Thandar, Zettler & Arumugam, 2010
- Ocnus petiti (Cherbonnier, 1958)
- Ocnus placominutus Thandar, Zettler & Arumugam, 2010
- Ocnus planci (Brandt, 1835)
- Ocnus pygmaeus Semper, 1867
- Ocnus rowei Thandar, 2008
- Ocnus tantulus Cherbonnier, 1988
- Ocnus vicarius Bell, 1883
