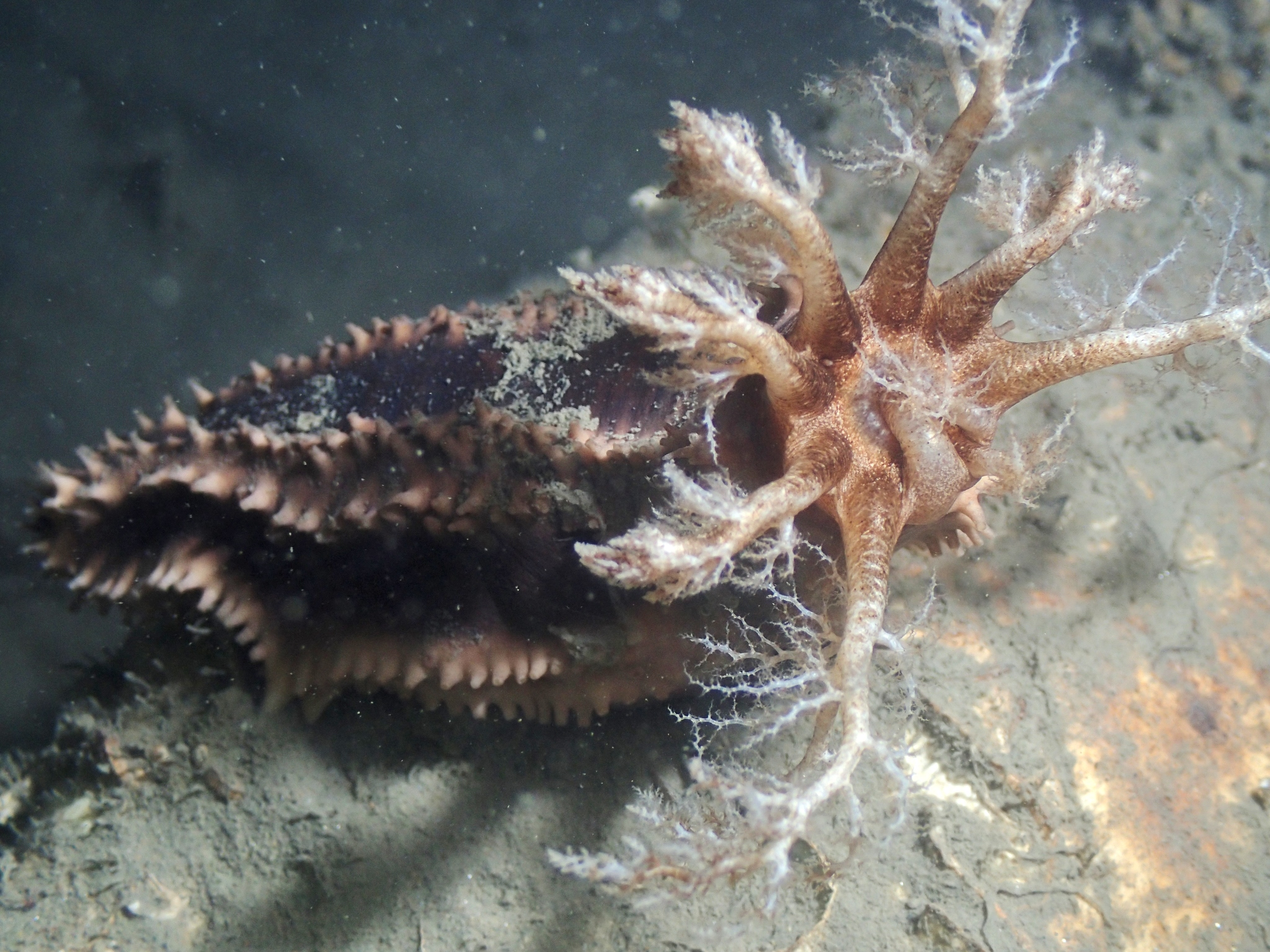

Scientific classification
- Kingdom: Animalia
- Phylum: Echinodermata
- Class: Holothuroidea
- Order: Dendrochirotida
- Family: Cucumariidae
- Genus: Ocnus
- Species: O. planci

Binomial name
- Ocnus planci Brandt, 1835

Synonyms
- Cladodactyla planci Brandt, 1835; Cucumaria planci Von Marenzeller, 1893; Holothuria brunneus (W. Thompson, 1840); Ocnus brunneus Forbes & Goodsir, in Forbes, 1841

= Ocnus planci =

Species of sea cucumber

Ocnus planci is a species of sea cucumber in the family Cucumariidae. It is native to the north-eastern Atlantic Ocean.

== Description ==
Oncus planci is a cylindrically-shaped sea cucumber growing up to 150 mm (6 in) in length, and 35 mm (1.4 in) in diameter they have a brownish color, often with irregular dark brown patches. They have ten tentacles The eight large and two small feeding tentacles are branched, leaf-like, and lighter in colour than the body. They are suspension feeders. They have retractile tube feet arranged in five zigzag double rows. They have thick smooth leathery skin which is strengthened with calcareous spicules; some of these are plates pierced by more than four holes, and others are cup-shaped.

== Reproduction ==
Oncus planci is known to show neoteny, which means the juvenile form is retained beyond the usual age of maturation. The neotenous form has a single row of tube feet and is less than an inch long. These individuals were at first mistaken for a separate species which was given the biological name Ocnus brunneus.

The sexes are separate in this species and adults reproduce sexually by spawning in spring. The fertilised eggs are retained by the female on her tentacles where they develop directly into the adult form without undergoing metamorphosis. The neotenous form reproduces asexually by transverse binary fission.

== Distribution and habitat ==
These sea cucumbers are found in European waters and off the coast of West Africa. The neotenous form being distributed in the north. They are epifaunal species living on hard substrates, on rocks, shells, tubeworms and algae. They are found at depths of between 15 and 175 m (50 and 570 ft). This species is found in Carlingford Lough and Strangford Lough in Northern Ireland, and because of its rarity there, it is listed as a Northern Ireland Priority Species.
