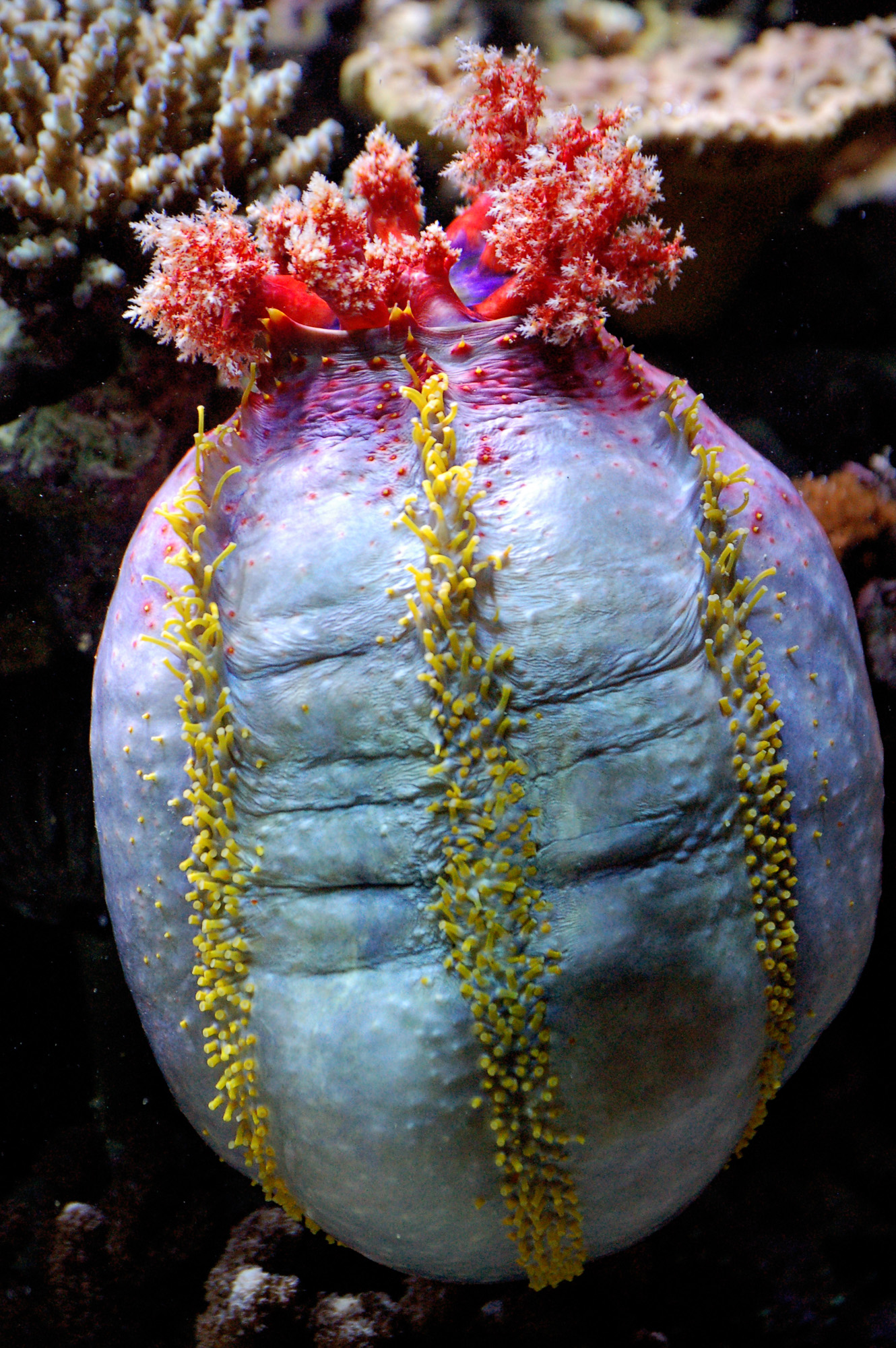
- Pseudocolochirus axiologus

Scientific classification
- Kingdom: Animalia
- Phylum: Echinodermata
- Class: Holothuroidea
- Order: Dendrochirotida
- Family: Cucumariidae
- Genus: Pseudocolochirus; Pearson, 1910

Species
- Pseudocolochirus axiologus (H. L. Clark, 1914); Pseudocolochirus misakiensis Yamana & Kohtsuka, 2018; Pseudocolochirus unica (Cherbonnier, 1988); Pseudocolochirus violaceus (Théel, 1886)

Synonyms
- Koehleria Cherbonnier, 1988

= Sea apple =

Non-taxonomic group of sea cucumbers

Sea apple is the common name for the colorful and somewhat round sea cucumbers of the genus Pseudocolochirus, found in Indo-Pacific waters. Sea apples are filter feeders with tentacles, ovate bodies, and tube-like feet. As with many other holothurians, they can release their internal organs or a toxin into the water when stressed.

== Physiology ==
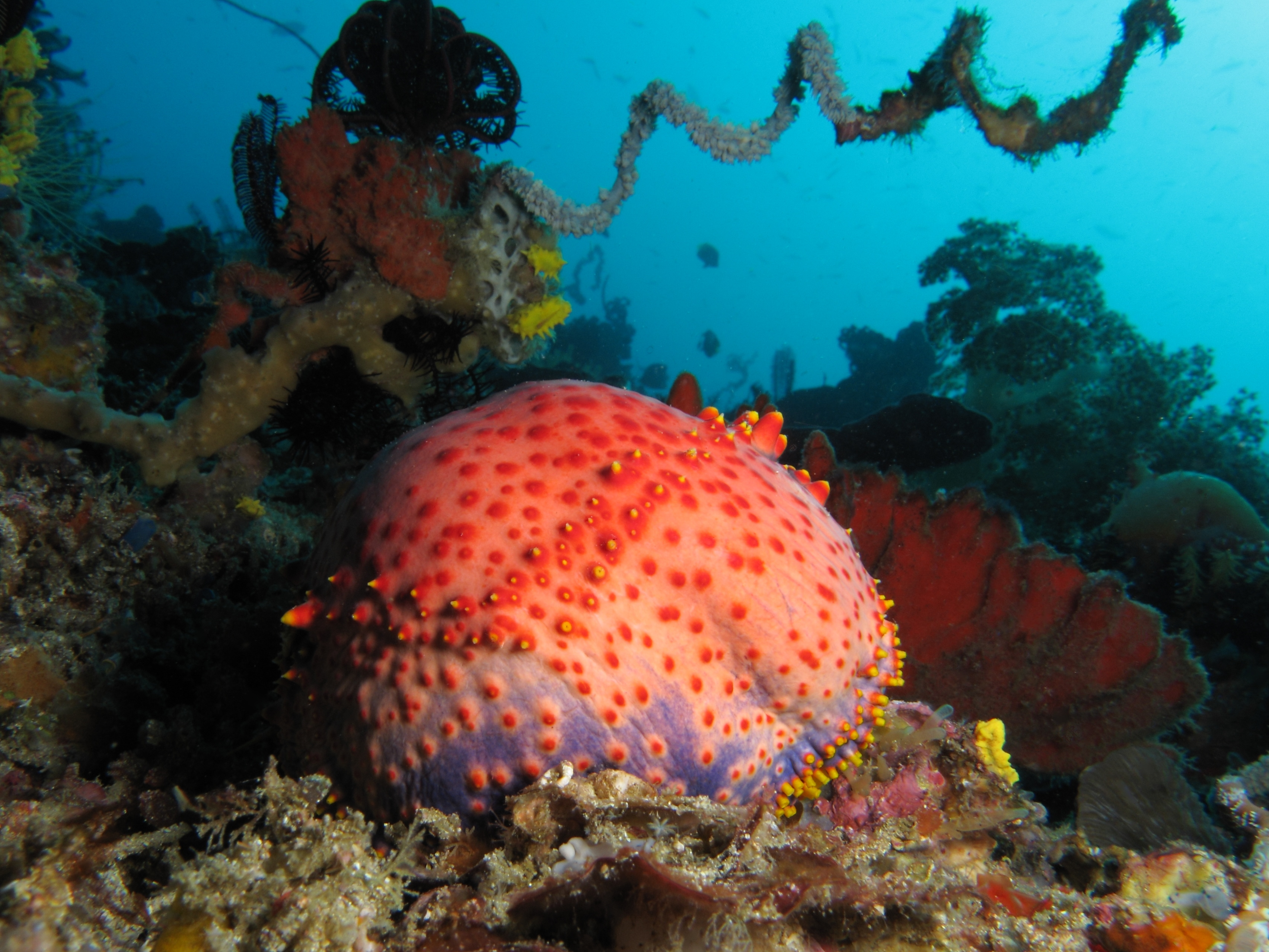
Sea apple at Nusa Kode

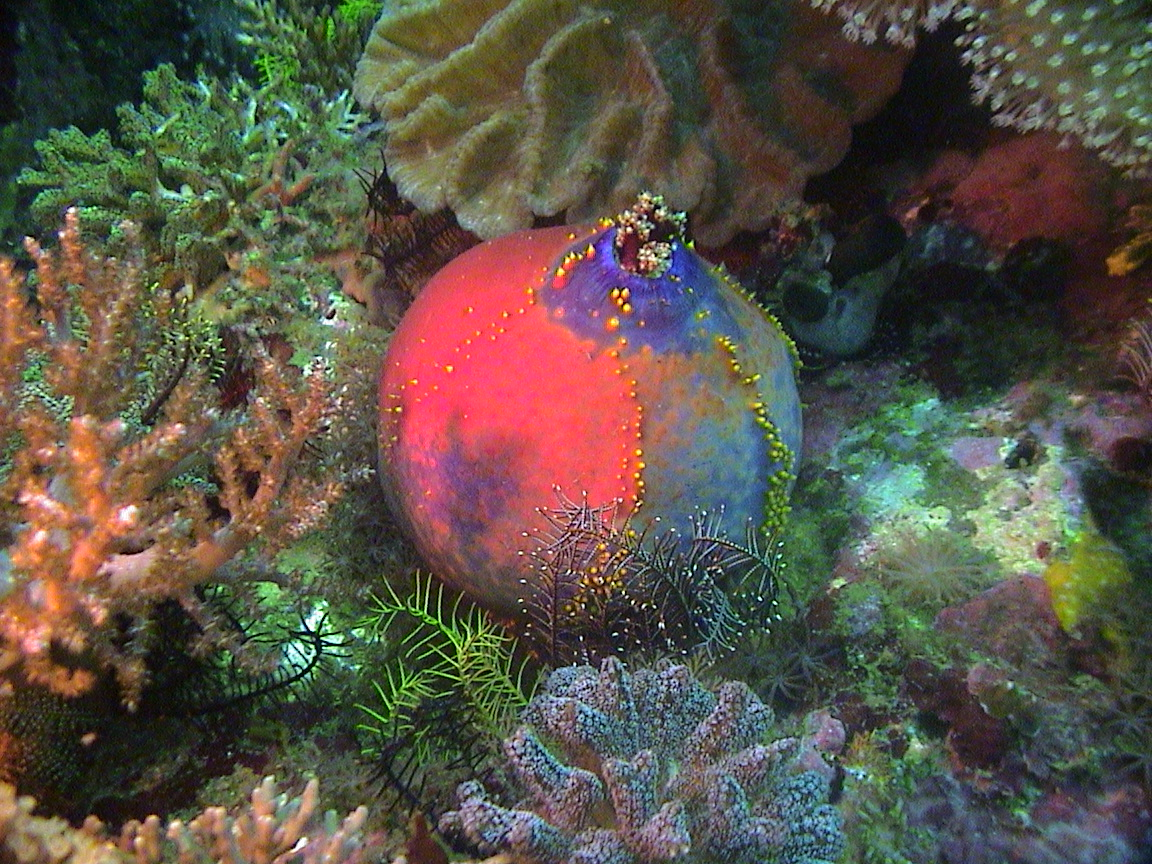
Pseudocolochirus violaceus amongst other invertebrates

Sea apples are holothuroids, and as such share many of the same physical characteristics. A few notable characteristics are discussed below.

=== Anatomy and feeding ===
The ovate body of an adult sea apple can grow up to 7.8 inches (20 cm) long. A central mouth-like cavity is surrounded by feathery tentacles, which add additional length. Sea apples, like many echinoderms, have rows of tube feet which help them move over and adhere to structures.

The bodies and tentacles of sea apples come in many colorings. The Australian species has a primarily purple body, red feet, and purple and white tentacles.

The sea apple feeds primarily on plankton, which it filters from the water with its tentacles. It alternately brings each tentacle to its mouth, scraping off the captured plankton.

Sea apples usually feed at night, a time when their delicate tentacles are less at risk from predators.

=== Defense ===
When disturbed, sea apples, like other holothuroids, can violently extrude their entrails from their posterior in a process called evisceration (autotomy). In addition, sea apples can release a toxic saponin called holothurin into the water as a defense mechanism.

In addition, if threatened or in an unsuitable environment, sea apples can consume large amounts of surrounding seawater to swell to nearly double their original size. This allows them to be moved to a new area by water currents, and much more quickly than they could walk.

== Problems in captivity ==
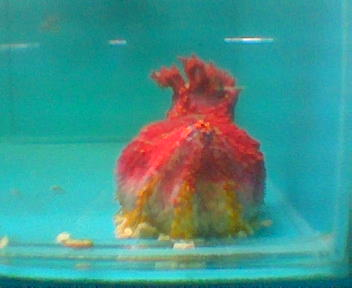
Pseudocolochirus violaceus

Because of their interesting appearance and behavior, sea apples are often widely desired as specimen for display in marine aquariums. They are considered reef safe as far as their compatibility with other species. However, they can be considered unsafe for reef aquaria for multiple reasons:

=== Starvation ===
Sea apples often starve to death in display aquaria. Levels of plankton in aquaria are often lower than optimal, and sea apples are often seen attempting to feed not only at night, as in their natural habitat, but also in the daytime. With only low levels of food available, these sea apples often starve, becoming progressively smaller as this happens. To try to circumvent these problems, hobbyists attempt to give the sea apple specimens supplemental feedings of plankton and liquid food.

=== Harassment and predation ===
Sea apples are often harassed by many aquarium inhabitants. Crustaceans, such as hermit crabs, and fish often peck or pick at sea apple's feathery tentacles. This may be for predatory purposes, or simply to steal trapped particles and plankton from the tentacles.

Occasionally, sea apples use their defense mechanisms in response to harassment. The release of their toxin can poison other aquarium inhabitants, and is one of the reasons they are not commonly seen in aquariums.
