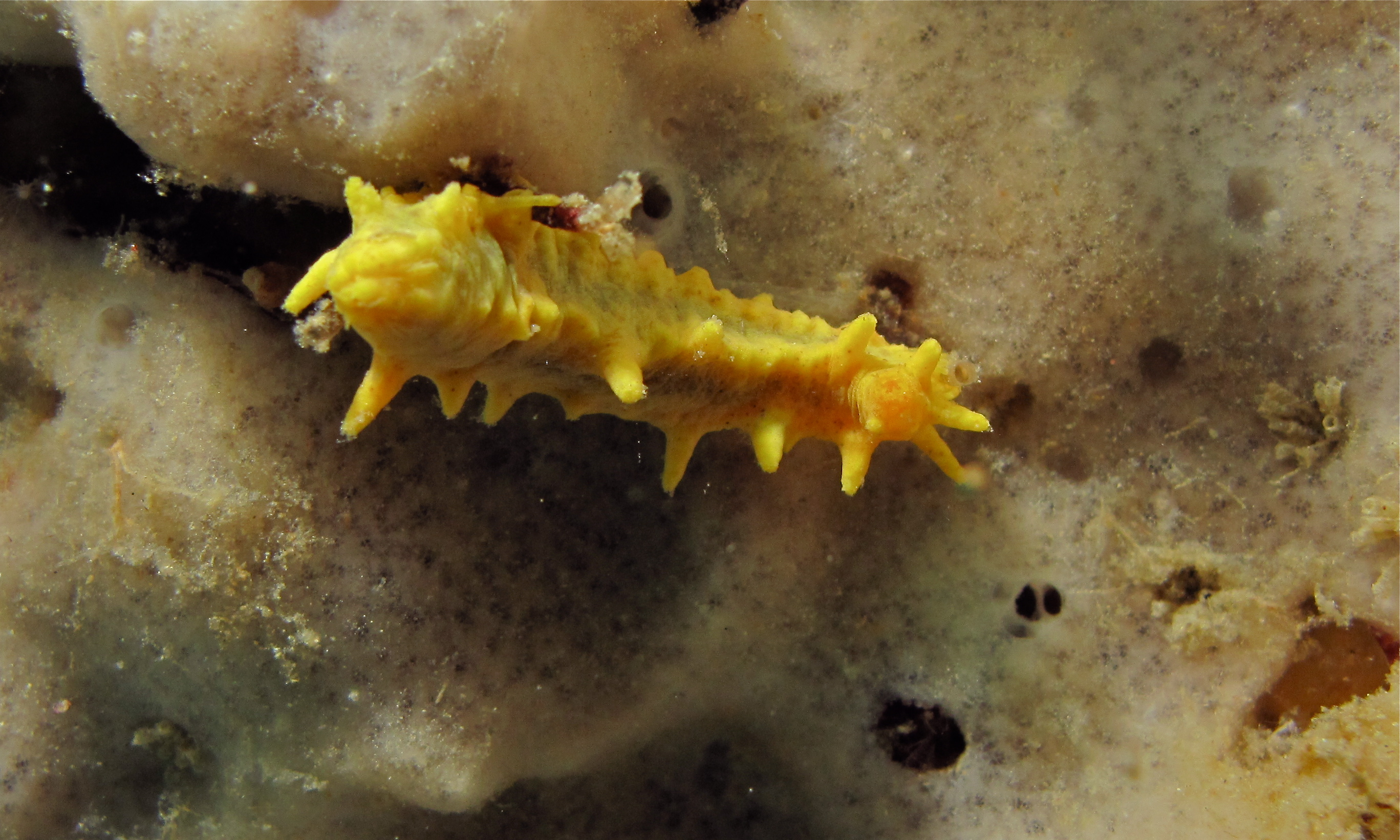
- Pentacta lutea

Scientific classification
- Kingdom: Animalia
- Phylum: Echinodermata
- Class: Holothuroidea
- Order: Dendrochirotida
- Family: Cucumariidae
- Genus: Pentacta; Goldfuss, 1820

= Pentacta =

Genus of sea cucumbers

Pentacta is a genus of echinoderms belonging to the family Cucumariidae.

The species of this genus are found in Indian Ocean, Malesia.

Species:

- Pentacta doliolum (Pallas, 1766)
- Pentacta guinensis (Heding, 1943)
- Pentacta hedingi Panning, 1940
- Pentacta nipponensis Clark, 1938
- Pentacta panamensis Verrill, 1867
- Pentacta peterseni Ancona Lopez, 1965
- Pentacta verrucula Cherbonnier, 1988
