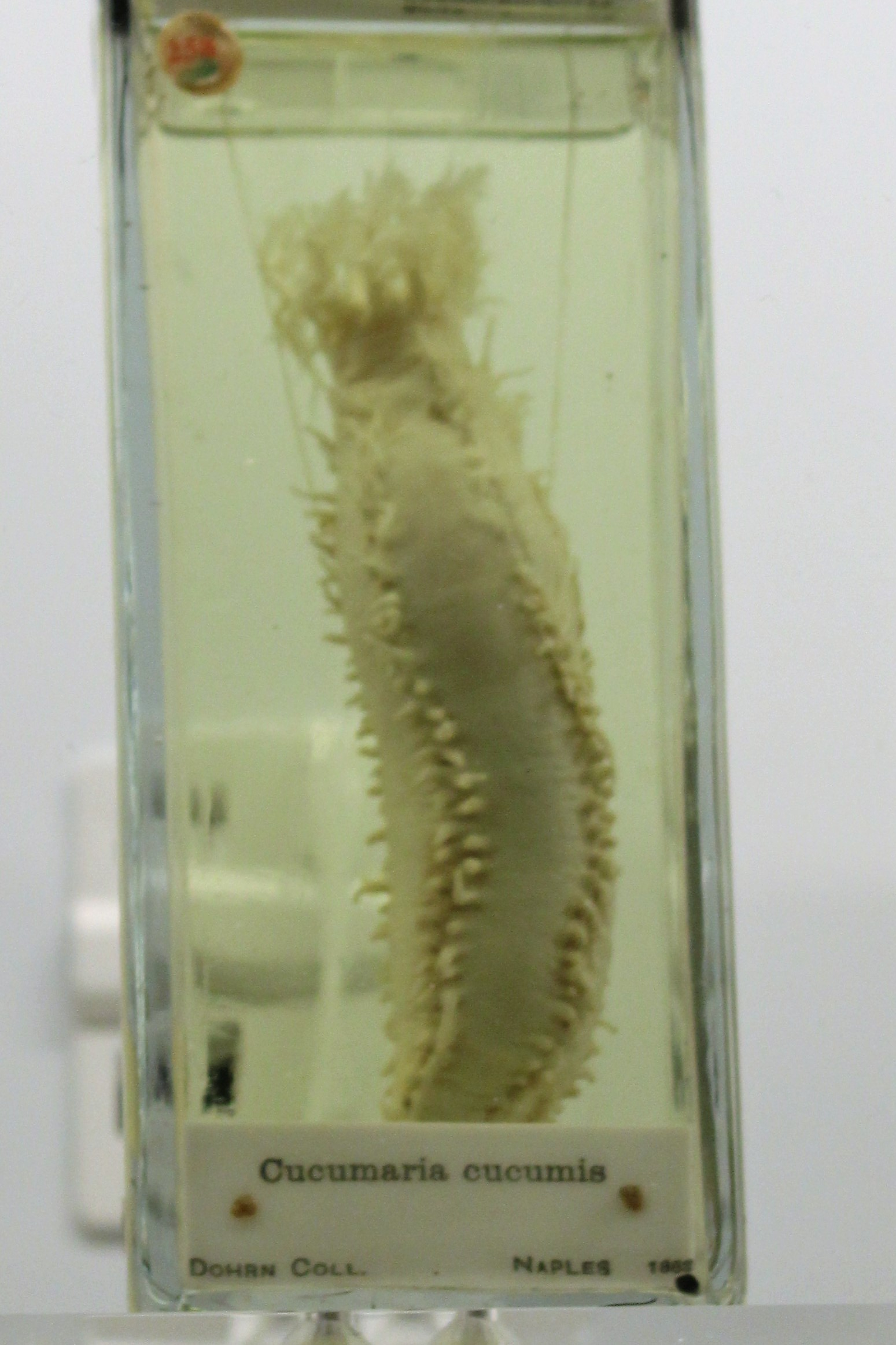
- Paraleptopentacta elongata

Scientific classification
- Kingdom: Animalia
- Phylum: Echinodermata
- Class: Holothuroidea
- Order: Dendrochirotida
- Family: Cucumariidae
- Genus: Paraleptopentacta; Mezali, Thandar & Khodja, 2020

Type species
- Cucumaria elongata Düben & Koren, 1846

= Paraleptopentacta =

Genus of sea cucumbers

Paraleptopentacta is a genus of sea cucumbers within the family Cucumariidae. Members of this genus can be found distributed around marine European waters in the Mediterranean Sea, North Sea, and the eastern Atlantic Ocean.

== Species ==
- Paraleptopentacta cucumis (Risso, 1826)
- Paraleptopentacta djakonovi (Baranova & Saveleva, 1972)
- Paraleptopentacta elongata (Düben & Koren, 1846)
- Paraleptopentacta tergestina (Sars, 1859)
