= Leptopentacta =

Scientific classification
- Kingdom: Animalia
- Phylum: Echinodermata
- Class: Holothuroidea
- Order: Dendrochirotida
- Family: Cucumariidae
- Genus: Leptopentacta; Studer, 1876

Species
- See text

Synonyms
- Parocnus Deichmann, 1941; Siphothuria Perrier E., 1886; Trachythyone auct. [non Studer, 1876]

Genus of sea cucumbers

Leptopentacta is a genus of sea cucumbers in the family Cucumariidae.

== Species ==
The following species are recognised in the genus Leptopentacta:

- Leptopentacta bacilliformis (Koehler & Vaney, 1908)
- Leptopentacta grisea Clark, 1938
- Leptopentacta imbricata (Semper, 1867)
- Leptopentacta nina Deichmann, 1941
- Leptopentacta nova Deichmann, 1941
- Leptopentacta panamica Deichmann, 1941
- Leptopentacta punctabipedia Cherbonnier, 1961
