= Loisettea =

Scientific classification
- Kingdom: Animalia
- Phylum: Echinodermata
- Class: Holothuroidea
- Order: Dendrochirotida
- Family: Cucumariidae
- Genus: Loisettea; Rowe & Pawson, 1985

Type species
- Loisettea amphictena Rowe & Pawson, 1985

Genus of sea cucumbers

Loisettea is a genus of sea cucumbers in the family Cucumariidae. It was first described in 1985. The genus name honours Loisette M. Marsh.

This genus differs from others in the subfamily Colochirinae in having body wall ossicles, which are deep complex cups, buttons, and large scales. Species of this genus are found off the north-western coasts of Australia, and off the Sunda Islands.

== Species ==
The following two species are recognised in the genus Loisettea:

- Loisettea amphictena Rowe & Pawson, 1985
- Loisettea gazellae (Lampert, 1889)
