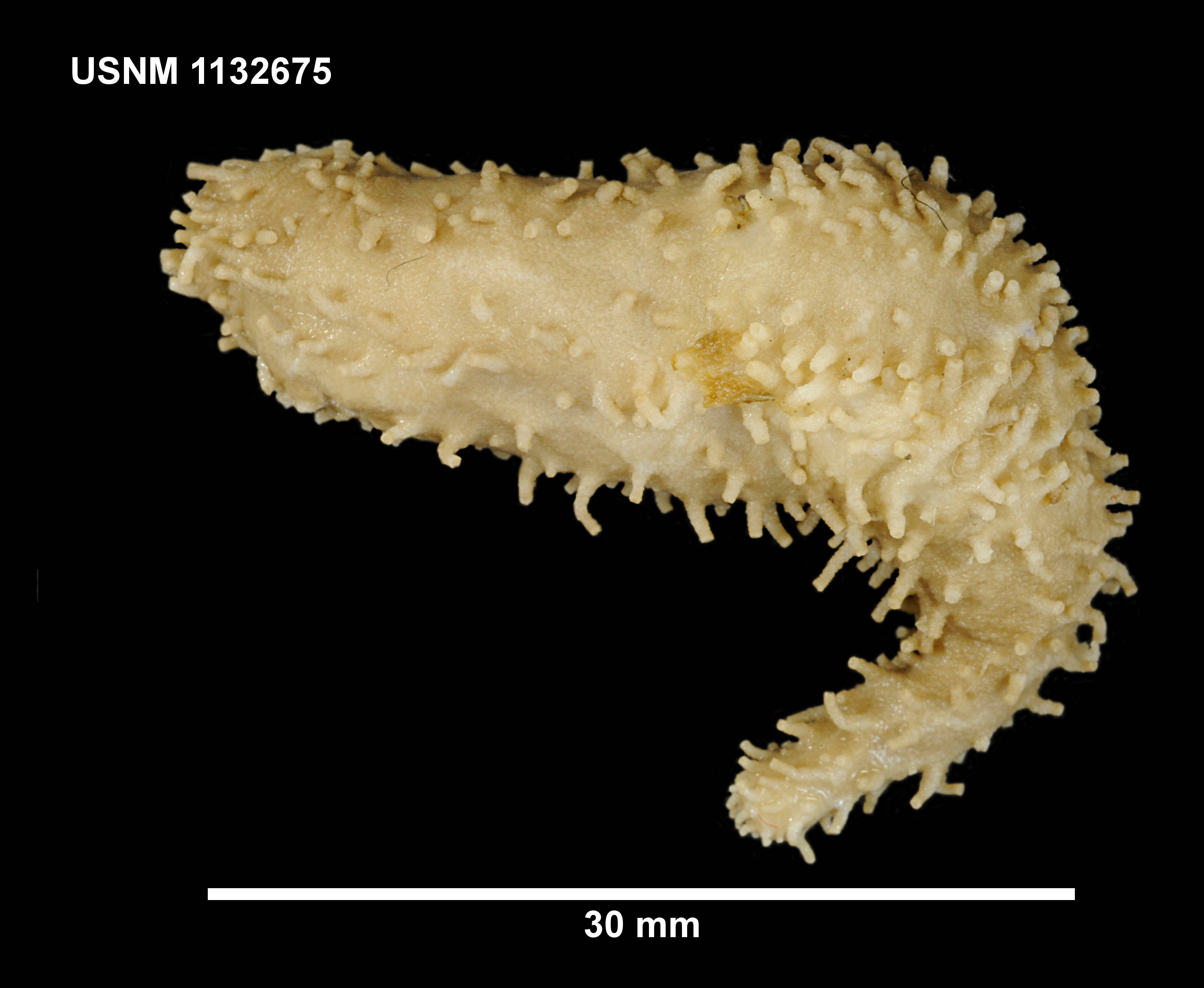
- Trachythyone bouvetensis

Scientific classification
- Kingdom: Animalia
- Phylum: Echinodermata
- Class: Holothuroidea
- Order: Dendrochirotida
- Family: Cucumariidae
- Genus: Trachythyone; Studer, 1876

Species
- See text

= Trachythyone =

Genus of sea cucumbers

Trachythyone is a genus of sea cucumbers in the family Cucumariidae.

== Species ==
The following species are recognised in the genus Trachythyone:

- Trachythyone candida O'Loughlin & O'Hara, 1992
- Trachythyone crassipeda Cherbonnier, 1961
- Trachythyone flaccida Thandar, 2013
- Trachythyone glaberrima (Semper, 1869)
- Trachythyone glebosa O'Loughlin & O'Hara, 1992
- Trachythyone lechleri (Lampert, 1885)
- Trachythyone macphersonae Pawson, 1962
- Trachythyone maxima Massin, 1992
- Trachythyone muricata Studer, 1876
- Trachythyone nina (Deichmann, 1930)
- Trachythyone peruana (Semper, 1868)
