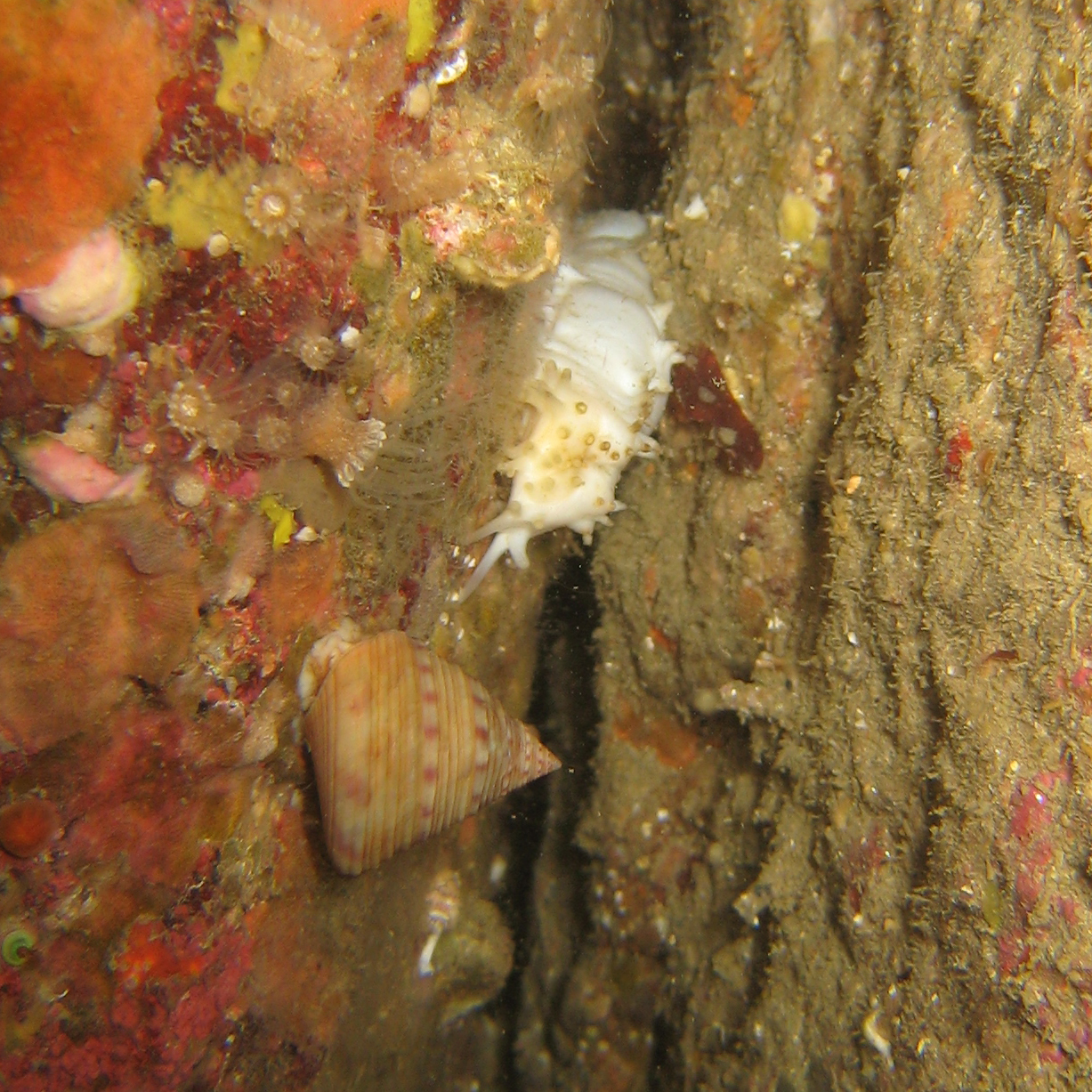
- In a crevice

Scientific classification
- Domain: Eukaryota
- Kingdom: Animalia
- Phylum: Echinodermata
- Class: Holothuroidea
- Order: Dendrochirotida
- Family: Cucumariidae
- Genus: Pawsonia
- Species: P. saxicola

Binomial name
- Pawsonia saxicola (Brady & Robertson, 1871)

Synonyms
- Cucumaria saxicola Brady & Robertson, 1871

= Pawsonia saxicola =

Species of sea cucumber

Pawsonia saxicola, the sea gherkin, is a species of sea cucumber in the family Cucumariidae. It is found in the northeastern Atlantic Ocean and the Mediterranean Sea.

== Description ==
Pawsonia saxicola has a solid, cylindrical body and can grow to a length of 150 mm (6 in). The mouth is at the anterior end and is surrounded by a circle of ten, black and white, mottled, branching, tentacles used for feeding, up to 100 mm (4 in) long. The cuticle of the body is smooth with five longitudinal rows of tube feet. The ventral rows are double and clearly visible, while the dorsal rows are largely replaced by low button-shaped protuberances, except near the mouth. The cuticle contains calcareous spicules which are star-shaped. This sea cucumber may be confused with Aslia lefevrei. Both live in crevices with their dark-coloured tentacles projecting; P. saxicola is white, but may darken somewhat when exposed to light, while Aslia lefevrei is brown.

== Distribution and habitat ==
This sea cucumber is native to the northeastern Atlantic Ocean and the Mediterranean Sea. Its range extends from the west and south coast of the British Isles to the coasts of France, Spain and Portugal and to the Azores. Its habitat is rocky shores where it conceals itself in crevices and under rocks, from the lower shore down to around 50 m (160 ft).

== Ecology ==
Pawsonia saxicola is a suspension feeder, consuming diatoms and single-cell algae and also zooplankton, such as copepods, ostracods, protozoans, nematodes, jellyfish and larvae, as well as drifting organic particles. The food is gathered by the feeding tentacles which each in turn shrinks and bends and is inserted into the mouth; the two ventral tentacles are short and forked, and are used at the mouth to push particles inside. Although in some related species the short tentacles co-ordinate their activities with the longer tentacles, this is not the case in P. saxicola where they seem to act independently.
