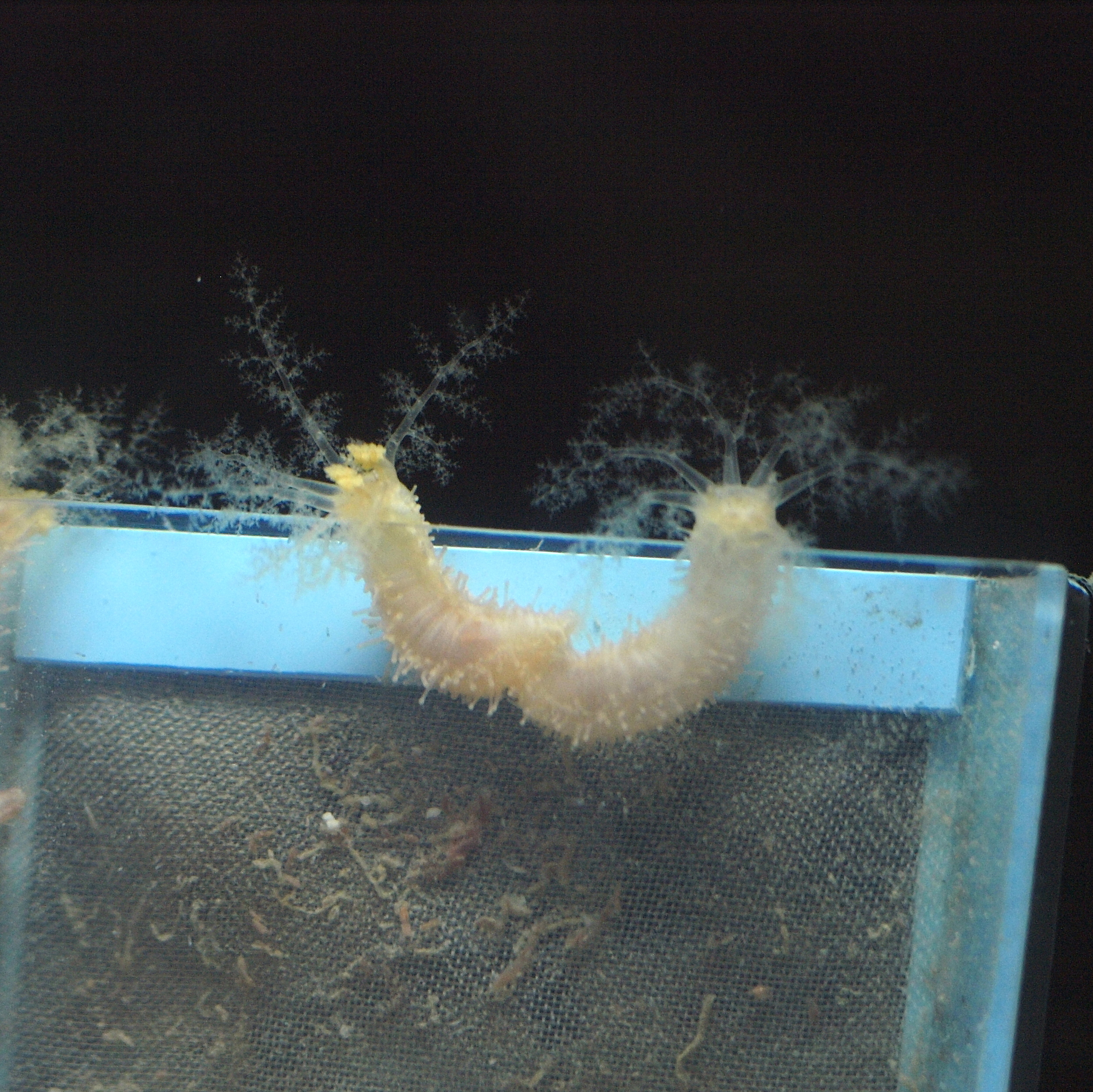
- Pseudocnus echinatus

Scientific classification
- Kingdom: Animalia
- Phylum: Echinodermata
- Class: Holothuroidea
- Order: Dendrochirotida
- Family: Cucumariidae
- Genus: Pseudocnus; Panning, 1949

= Pseudocnus =

Genus of sea cucumbers

Pseudocnus is a genus of sea cucumbers in the family Cucumariidae.

== Species ==
The following species are recognised in the genus Pseudocnus:

- Pseudocnus alcocki (Koehler & Vaney, 1908)
- Pseudocnus californicus (Semper, 1868)
- Pseudocnus curatus (Cowles, 1907)
- Pseudocnus dubiosus (Semper, 1868)
- Pseudocnus echinatus (von Marenzeller, 1881)
- Pseudocnus grubii (von Marenzeller, 1874)
- Pseudocnus koellikeri (Semper, 1868)
- Pseudocnus lamperti (Ohshima, 1915)
- Pseudocnus lubricus (Clark, 1901)
- Pseudocnus pawsoni Won & Rho, 1998
- Pseudocnus rhopalodiformis (Heding, 1943)
- Pseudocnus rugosus Cherbonnier, 1957
- Pseudocnus sentus O'Loughlin & Alcock, 2000
- Pseudocnus spinosus (Ohshima, 1915)
- Pseudocnus thandari Moodley, 2008
