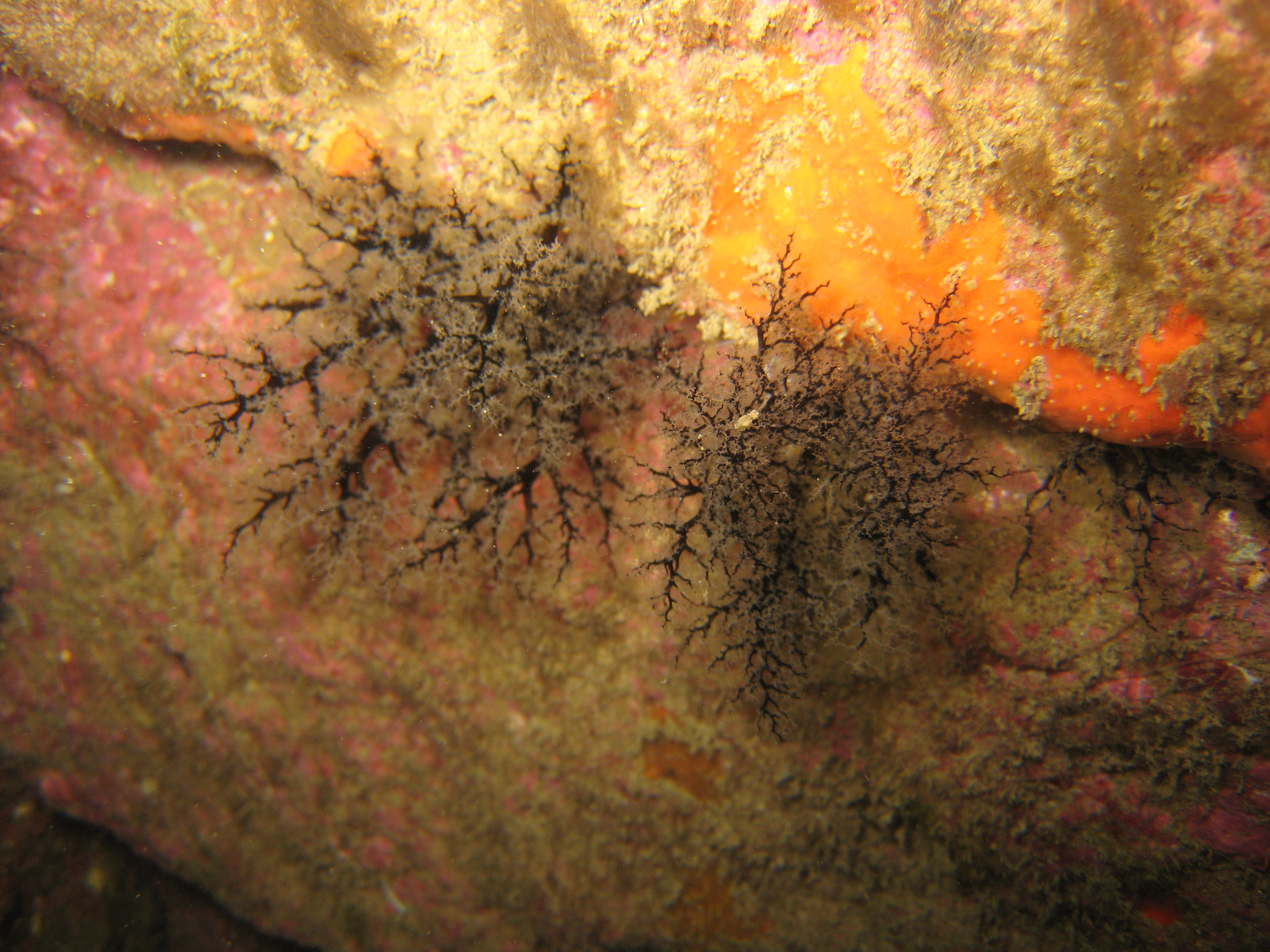

Scientific classification
- Domain: Eukaryota
- Kingdom: Animalia
- Phylum: Echinodermata
- Class: Holothuroidea
- Order: Dendrochirotida
- Family: Cucumariidae
- Genus: Aslia
- Species: A. lefevrii

Binomial name
- Aslia lefevrii (Barrois, 1882)

Synonyms
- Aslia lefevrei (Barrois, 1882)

= Aslia lefevrii =

Species of echinoderm

Aslia lefevrii is a species of sea cucumber belonging to the family Cucumariidae.

The species is found in the eastern coasts of Atlantic Ocean.
