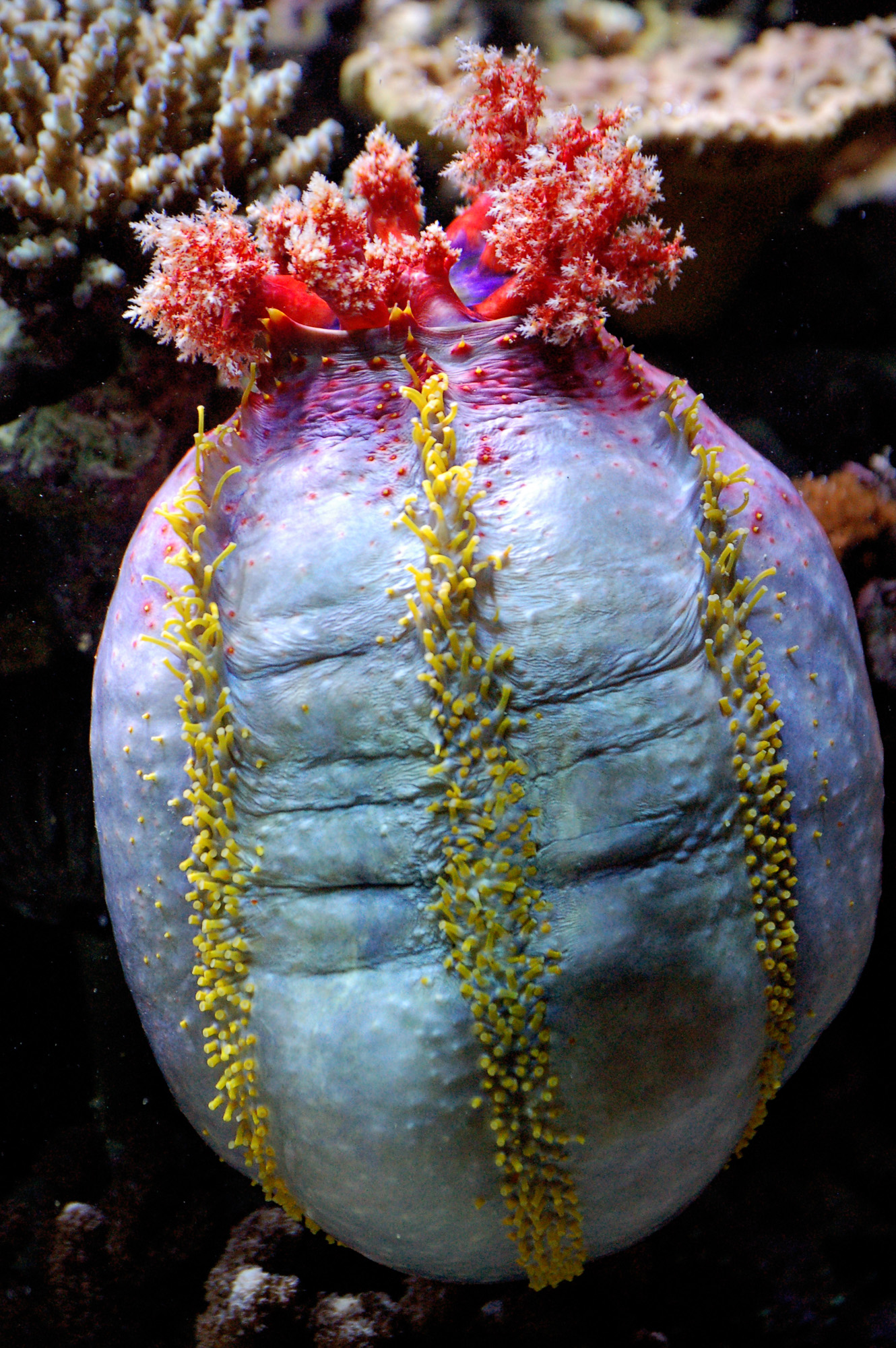
- Pseudocolochirus violaceus

Scientific classification
- Kingdom: Animalia
- Phylum: Echinodermata
- Class: Holothuroidea
- Order: Dendrochirotida
- Family: Cucumariidae; Ludwig, 1894

Genera
- See text

Synonyms
- Pentactidae Gray, 1842; Pentactidae Burmeister, 1837

= Cucumariidae =

Family of sea cucumbers

Cucumariidae is a family of sea cucumbers, marine animals with elongated bodies, leathery skins and tentacles that are found on the sea bed.

== Description ==
Members of the family Cucumariidae are small to medium-sized sea cucumbers, characterised by ten branching tentacles of which the lowest two are often smaller than the others. They are filter feeders, using their tentacles to catch micro-organisms and pass them to their mouth. They are seldom found on coral reefs but mostly live in deep water on sand and gravel substrates.

Certain genera including the sea apples in the genera Paracucumaria and Pseudocolochirus, contain toxic holothurin and holotoxin and release it into the water when damaged or killed. Spawning may also be accompanied by release of these toxins. For this reason, although they are interesting and attractive to keep in aquaria, it is inadvisable to keep them in a tank with other reef species.

== Taxonomy ==
A number of species that were placed in the family Phyllophoridae by Thander in 1989 and 1990 are now included in Cucumariidae. The following genera are accepted in the family Cucumariidae:

- Abyssocucumis Heding, 1942
- Actinocucumis Ludwig, 1875
- Amphicyclus Bell, 1884
- Anaperus Troschel, 1846
- Apseudocnus Levin, 2006
- Apsolidium O'Loughlin & O' Hara, 1992
- Aslia Rowe, 1970
- Athyonidium Deichmann, 1941
- Australocnus O'Loughlin & Alcock, 2000
- Benthophyllophorus Deichmann, 1954
- Calcamariina O'Loughlin in O'Loughlin et al., 2015
- Cercodemas Selenka, 1867
- Cherbocnus Thandar in Thandar & Mjobo, 2014
- Cladodactyla Brandt, 1835
- Colochirus Troschel, 1846
- Cucamba O'Loughlin, 2009
- Cucumaria Blainville, 1830
- Cucusquama O'Loughlin in O'Loughlin, Tavancheh & Harding, 2016
- Cucuvitrum O'Loughlin & O' Hara, 1992
- Echinopsolus Gutt, 1990
- Ekmania Hansen & McKenzie, 1991
- Euthyonacta Deichmann, 1954
- Hemiocnus Mjobo & Thandar, 2016
- Hemioedema Hérouard, 1929
- Heterocucumis Panning, 1949
- Incubocnus Thandar & Vinola, 2017
- Lanceophora Thandar, Zettler & Arumugam, 2010
- Leptopentacta H.L. Clark, 1938
- Loisettea Rowe & Pawson, 1985
- Mensamaria H.L. Clark, 1946
- Neoamphicyclus Hickman, 1962
- Neocucumella Pawson, 1962
- Neocucumis Deichmann, 1944
- Ocnus Forbes & Goodsir, in Forbes, 1841
- Orbithyone Clark, 1938
- Panningia Cherbonnier, 1958
- Paracolochirus Pawson, Pawson & King, 2010
- Paracucumaria Panning, 1949
- Paraleptopentacta Mezali, Thandar & Khodja, 2020
- Parathyonacta Caso, 1984
- Parathyone Deichmann, 1957
- Parathyonidium Heding in Heding & Panning, 1954
- Patallus Selenka, 1868
- Pawsonellus Thandar, 1986
- Pawsonia Rowe, 1970
- Pentacta Goldfuss, 1820
- Pentactella Verrill, 1876
- Pentocnus O'Loughlin & O'Hara, 1992
- Plesiocolochirus Cherbonnier, 1946
- Pseudoaslia Thandar, 1991
- Pseudocnella Thandar, 1987
- Pseudocnus Panning, 1949
- Pseudocolochirus Pearson, 1910
- Pseudopsolus Ludwig, 1898
- Pseudrotasfer Bohn, 2007
- Psolicrux O'Loughlin, 2002
- Psolicucumis Heding, 1934
- Psolidiella Mortensen, 1926
- Psolidocnus O'Loughlin & Alcock, 2000
- Roweia Thandar, 1985
- Squamocnus O'Loughlin & O'Hara, 1992
- Staurocucumis Ekman, 1927
- Staurothyone H.L. Clark, 1938
- Stereoderma Ayres, 1851
- Thyonella Verrill, 1872
- Thyonidium Düben & Koren, 1846
- Trachasina Thandar
- Trachycucumis Thandar & Moodley, 2003
- Trachythyone Studer, 1876
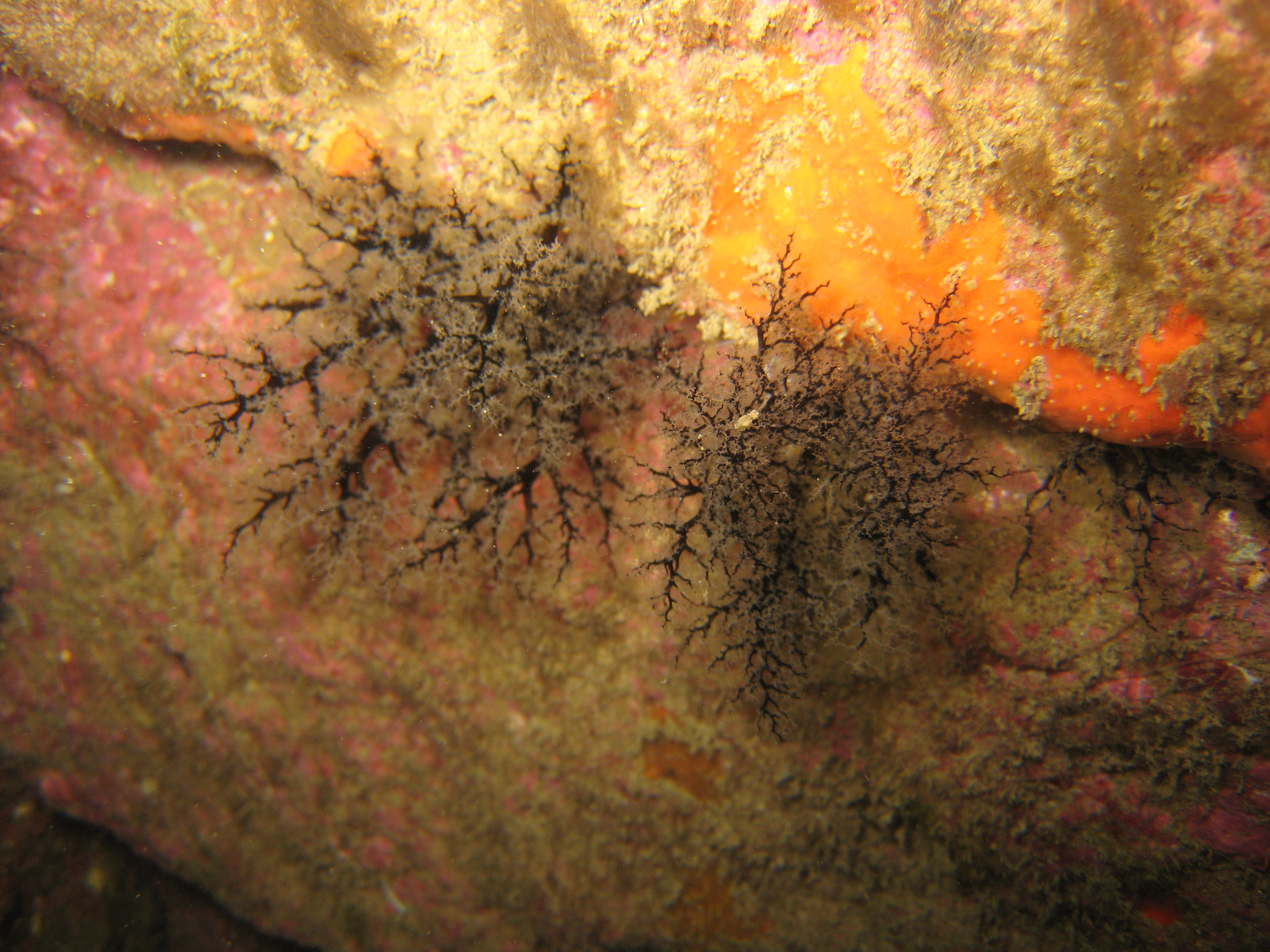
Aslia lefevrii

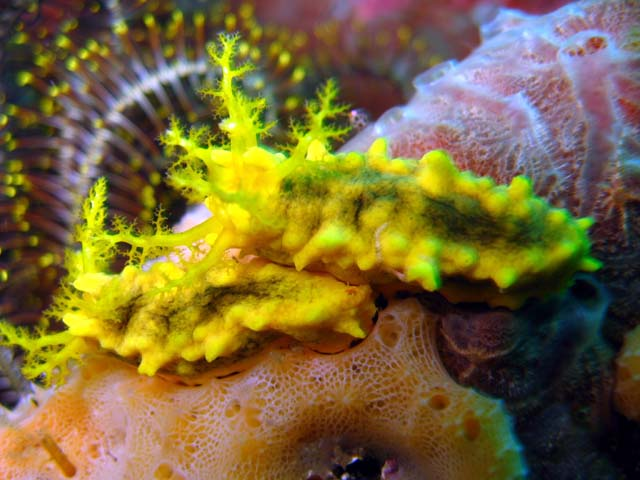
Colochirus robustus

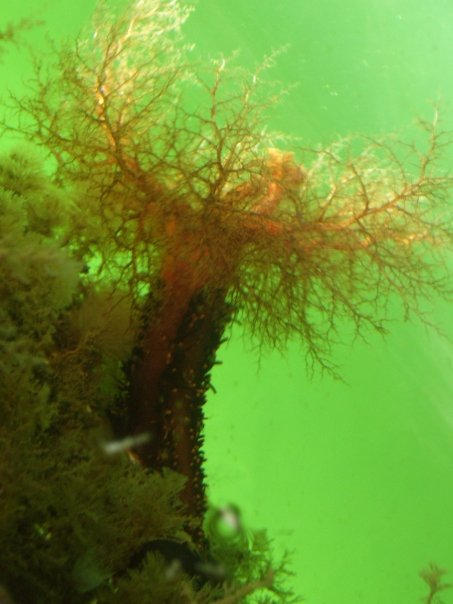
Cucumaria miniata

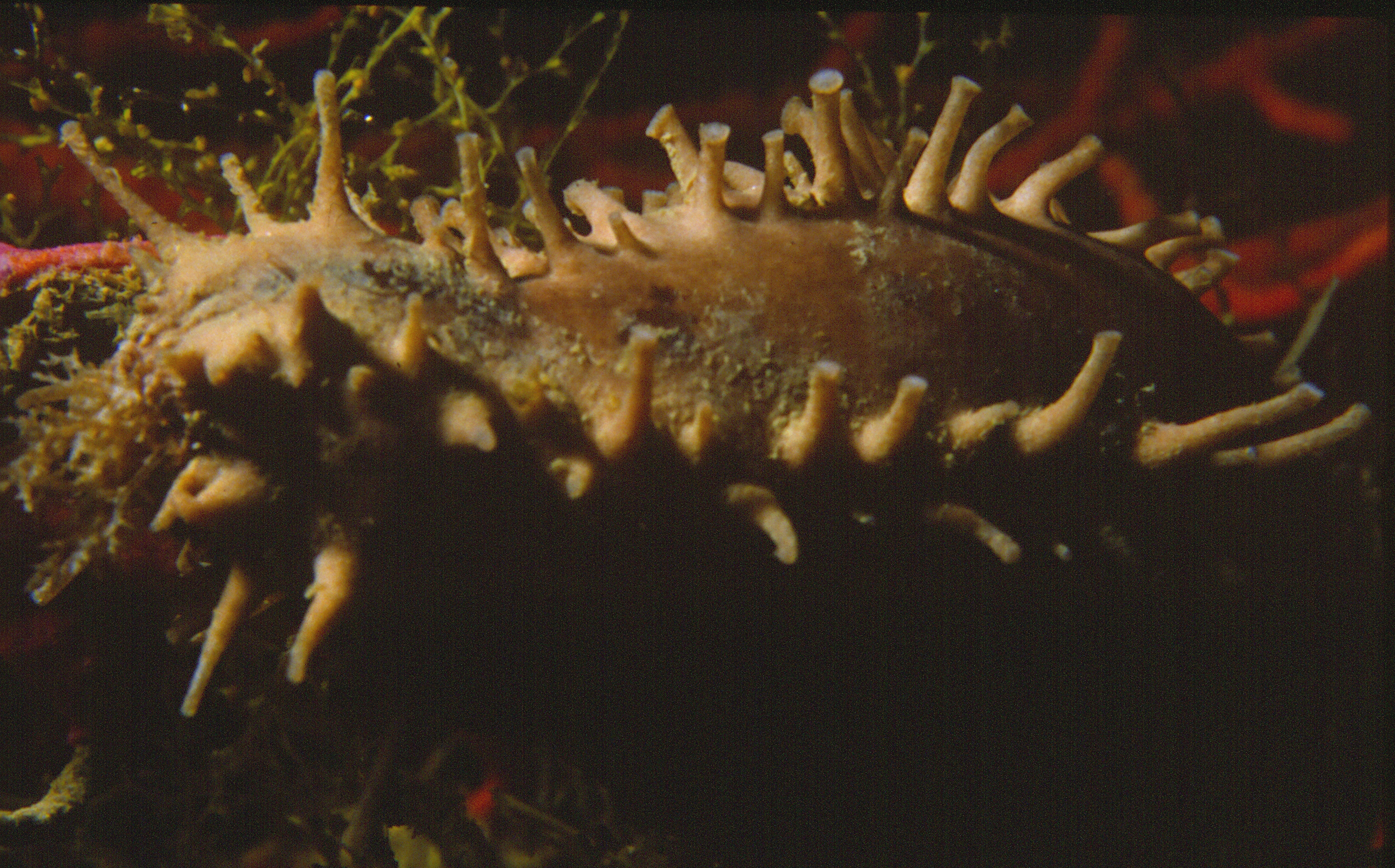
Ocnus planci

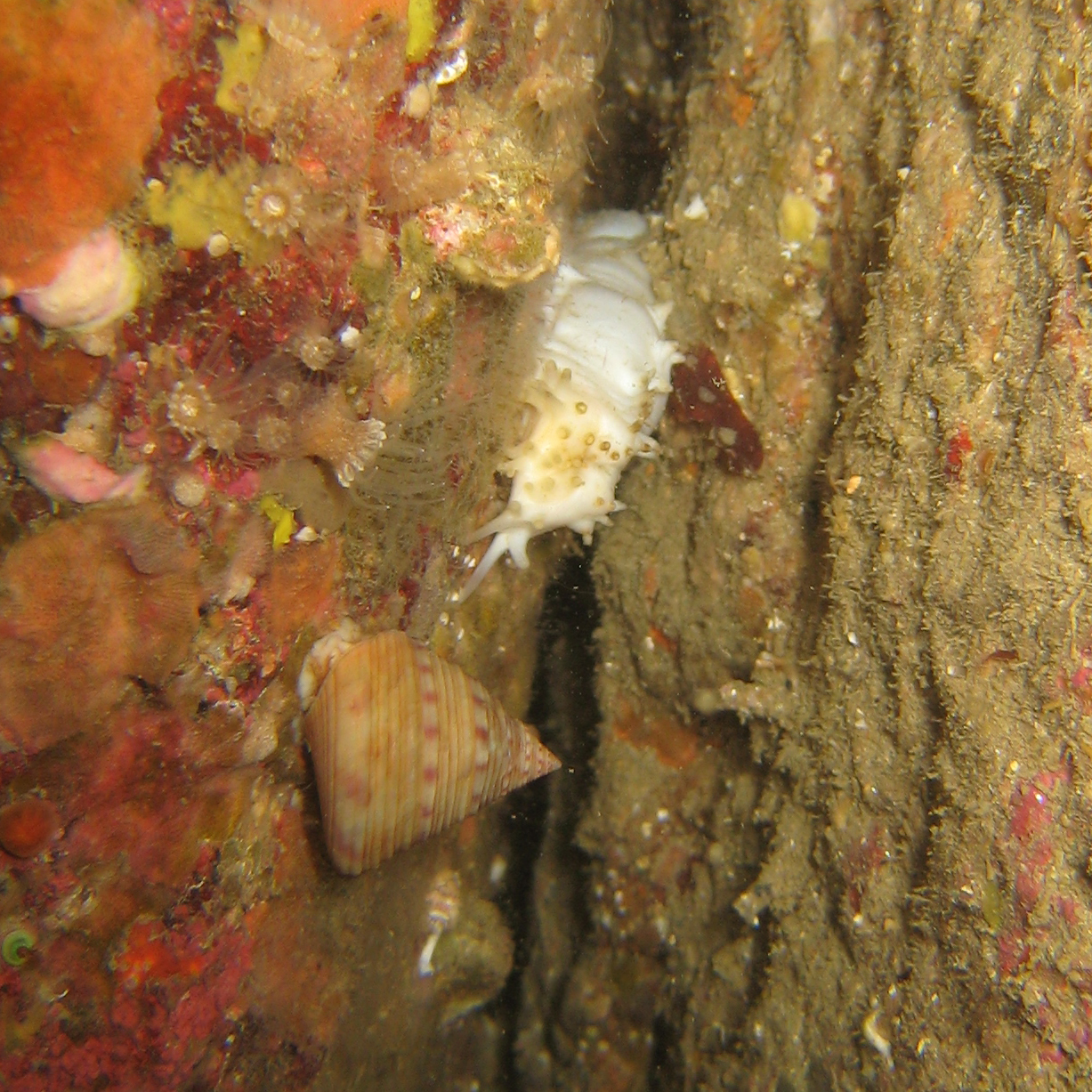
Pawsonia saxicola
