= Dactylochirotida =

Scientific classification
- Kingdom: Animalia
- Phylum: Echinodermata
- Class: Holothuroidea
- Subclass: Dendrochirotacea
- Order: Dactylochirotida; Pawson and Fell, 1965

Families
- Rhopalodinidae; Vaneyellidae; Ypsilothuriidae

Extinct order of sea cucumbers

Dactylochirotida is an order of primitive sea cucumbers. Unlike other sea cucumbers, their tentacles are not divided into multiple branches, and the body is enclosed within a flexible shell-like structure called a test.
