= Psolus chitonoides =

Conservation status
- Secure (NatureServe)

Scientific classification
- Kingdom: Animalia
- Phylum: Echinodermata
- Class: Holothuroidea
- Order: Dendrochirotida
- Family: Psolidae
- Genus: Psolus
- Species: P. chitonoides

Binomial name
- Psolus chitonoides Clark, 1901

Synonyms
- Psolus californicus Fisher, 1905; Psolus chitinoides Clark, 1901 [lapsus]

Species of sea cucumber

Psolus chitonoides, also known as the slipper sea cucumber, armoured sea cucumber, creeping armoured sea cucumber, or creeping pedal sea cucumber, is a species of sea cucumber in the family Psolidae. It is found in shallow water on the western coast of North America. The scientific name "chitonoides" means resembling a chiton.

== Description ==
The slipper sea cucumber has an oval body some 7 cm (3 in) long and 5.8 cm (2.3 in) wide. The upper surface is domed and the under surface or sole is well-equipped with tube feet. A staggered row of large tube feet run along the centre of the sole, one or two rows of stout tube feet run on either side of this near the edge, and a single row of smaller feet set in pits run along the edges of the sole. The mouth, surrounded by a ring of tentacles is at one end of the animal. The tentacles are repeatedly branched and number eight to ten, either all the same size or with two smaller than the rest. The anus is on the dorsal surface on the opposite end to the mouth. The skin is leathery, somewhat spiny, and protected by rows of stiff, overlapping scales. The scales are yellow to bright orange and the tentacles are red with white tips.

== Discovery ==
Psolus chitonoides was discovered in 1886, in Puget Sound by Columbia University teams.

== Distribution and habitat ==
The slipper sea cucumber is found on the western coast of North America, its range extending from the Aleutian Islands to Baja California. It occurs on both exposed coasts and in quiet inlets, in the sublittoral zone down to depths of about 247 m (800 ft). Its soft, pliable sole means that it can stick to rocks and it is commonly found clinging firmly to vertical rock faces.

== Ecology ==
The slipper sea cucumber is a suspension feeder, intercepting particles floating past which are then trapped by sticky papillae on its feeding tentacles. It has a high concentration of saponins in its tissues. This makes it toxic and it is avoided by most predatory fish, gastropod molluscs and crabs; its flesh has been shown to be unpalatable to the tidepool sculpin (Oligocottus maculosus). Its main predators are starfish, especially the leather star (Dermasterias imbricata). The juveniles of the species are photo negative. The eggs are a bright red in color.
