= Cucumella =

Cucumella may refer to:

- Cucumella (echinoderm), a genus of echinoderms in the family Cucumellidae
- Cucumella, a genus of plants in the family Cucurbitaceae, synonym of Cucumis
