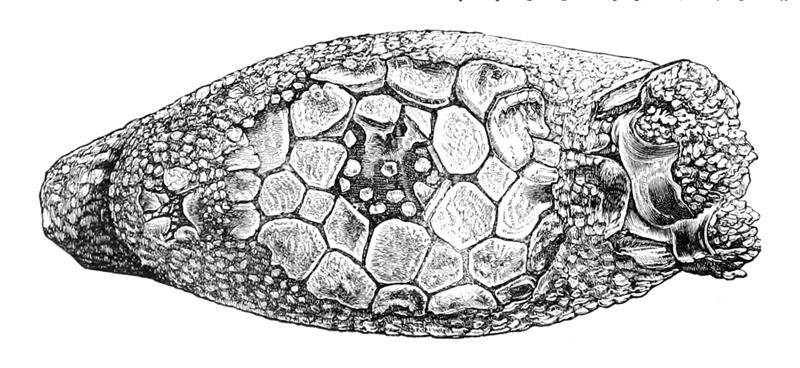

Scientific classification
- Kingdom: Animalia
- Phylum: Echinodermata
- Class: Holothuroidea
- Order: Dendrochirotida
- Family: Psolidae
- Genus: Psolus; Oken, 1815

Species
- See text

Synonyms
- Cuvieria Cuvier, ex Peron MS, 1817; Lepidopsolus Bronn, 1860; Lophothuria Verrill, 1866

= Psolus =

Genus of sea cucumbers

Psolus is a genus of sea cucumbers in the family Psolidae, marine animals with long bodies, leathery skins and tentacles, that inhabit the sea bed.

== Species ==
The following species are recognised in the genus Psolus:

- Psolus agulhasicus Ludwig & Heding, 1935
- Psolus antarcticus (Philippi, 1857)
- Psolus arnaudi Cherbonnier, 1974
- Psolus ascidiiformis Mitsukuri, 1912
- Psolus atlantis O'Loughlin in O'Loughlin et al., 2013
- Psolus belgicae Hérouard, 1901
- Psolus byrdae O'Loughlin & Whitfield, 2010
- Psolus capensis Ludwig & Heding, 1935
- Psolus carolineae O'Loughlin & Whitfield, 2010
- Psolus cherbonnieri Carriol & Féral, 1985
- Psolus chitonoides Clark, 1901
- Psolus complicatus Deichmann, 1930
- Psolus depressus Ludwig & Heding, 1935
- Psolus digitatus Ludwig, 1893
- Psolus diomedeae Ludwig, 1893
- Psolus dubiosus Ludwig & Heding, 1935
- Psolus ephippifer Thomson, 1877
- Psolus eximius Savel'eva, 1941
- Psolus fabricii (Düben & Koren, 1846)
- Psolus figulus Ekman, 1925
- Psolus fimbriatus Sluiter, 1901
- Psolus granulosus Vaney, 1906
- Psolus griffithsi Thandar, 2009
- Psolus heardi O'Loughlin & Skarbnik-López in O'Loughlin et al., 2015
- Psolus hypsinotus Heding, 1942
- Psolus imperfectus H.L. Clark, 1923
- Psolus japonicus Östergren, 1898
- Psolus lawrencei Martinez & Penchaszadeh, 2017
- Psolus levis Koehler & Vaney, 1905
- Psolus lockhartae O'Loughlin & Whitfield, 2010
- Psolus macquariensis Davey & Whitfield, 2013
- Psolus macrolepis Fisher, 1907
- Psolus mannarensis James, 1984
- Psolus megaloplax Pawson, 1968
- Psolus membranaceus Koehler & Vaney, 1905
- Psolus murrayi Théel, 1886
- Psolus nummularis Perrier R., 1899
- Psolus operculatus (Pourtalès, 1868)
- Psolus paradubiosus Carriol & Féral, 1985
- Psolus parantarcticus Mackenzie & Whitfield, 2011
- Psolus parvulus Cherbonnier, 1974
- Psolus patagonicus Ekman, 1925
- Psolus pauper Ludwig, 1893
- Psolus pawsoni Miller & Turner, 1986
- Psolus peronii Bell, 1883
- Psolus phantapus (Strussenfelt, 1765)
- Psolus pourtalesi Théel, 1886
- Psolus propinquus Sluiter, 1901
- Psolus punctatus Ekman, 1925
- Psolus rufus Fernández-Rodríguez, Arias, Borrell, Anadón, Massin & Acuña, 2017
- Psolus salottii Mackenzie & Whitfield, 2011
- Psolus segregatus Perrier, 1905
- Psolus solidus Massin, 1987
- Psolus springthorpei Mackenzie & Whitfield, 2011
- Psolus squamatus (O.F. Müller, 1776)
- Psolus steuarti Mackenzie & Whitfield, 2011
- Psolus tessellatus Koehler, 1896
- Psolus tropicus Cherbonnier, 1966
- Psolus tuberculosus Théel, 1886
- Psolus victoriae Tommasi, 1971

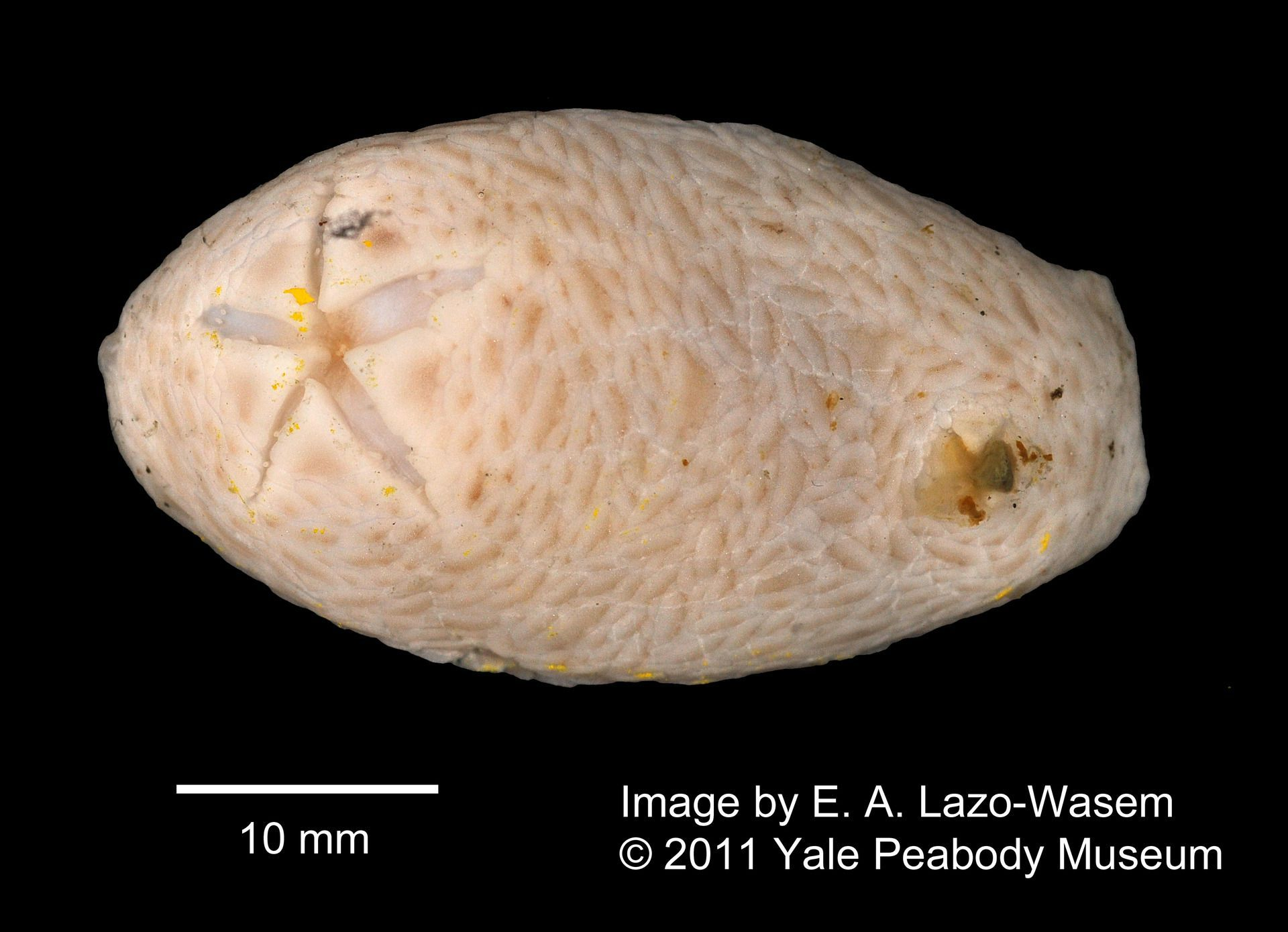
Psolus antarcticus.

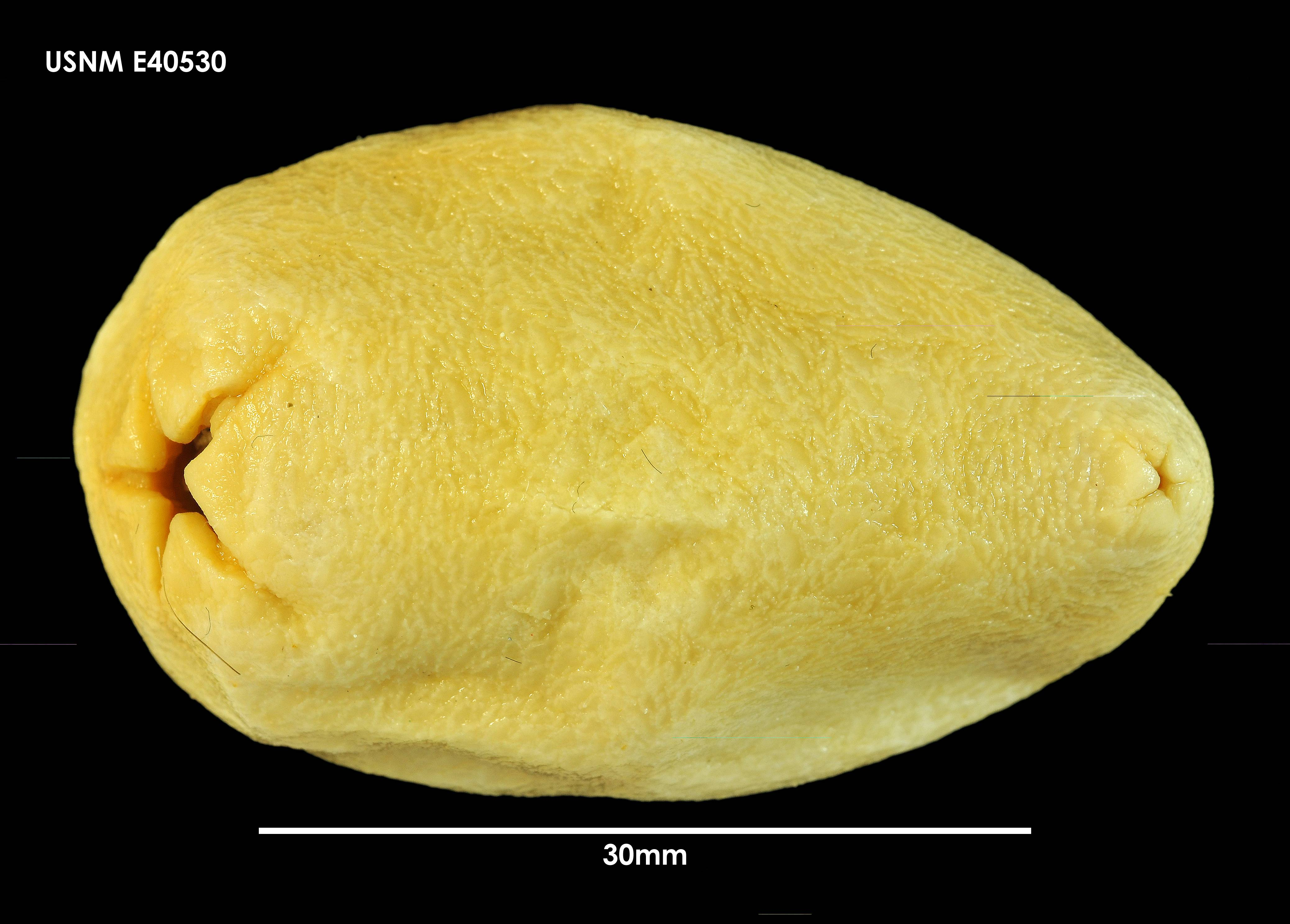
Psolus arnaudi.

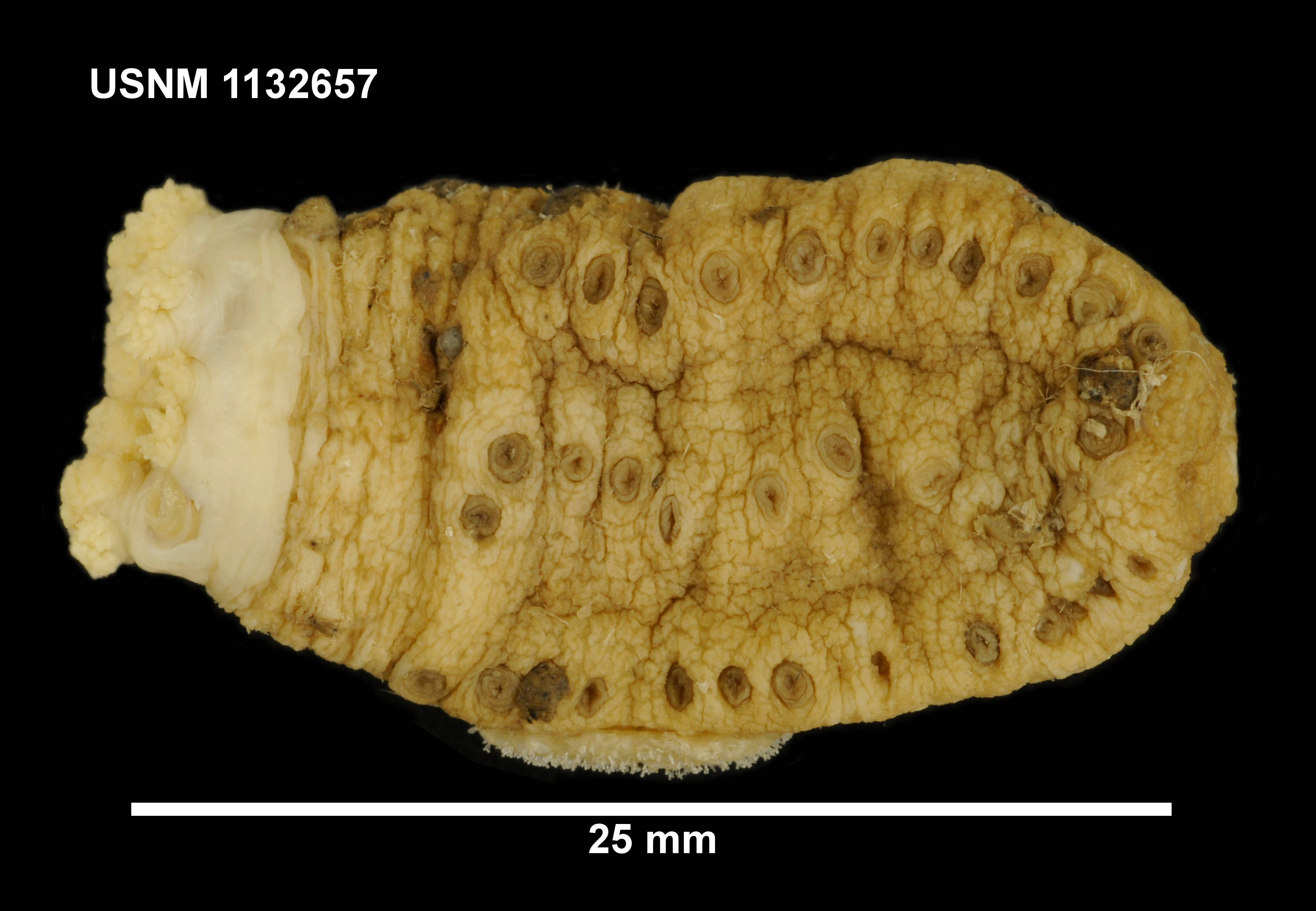
Psolus charcoti.

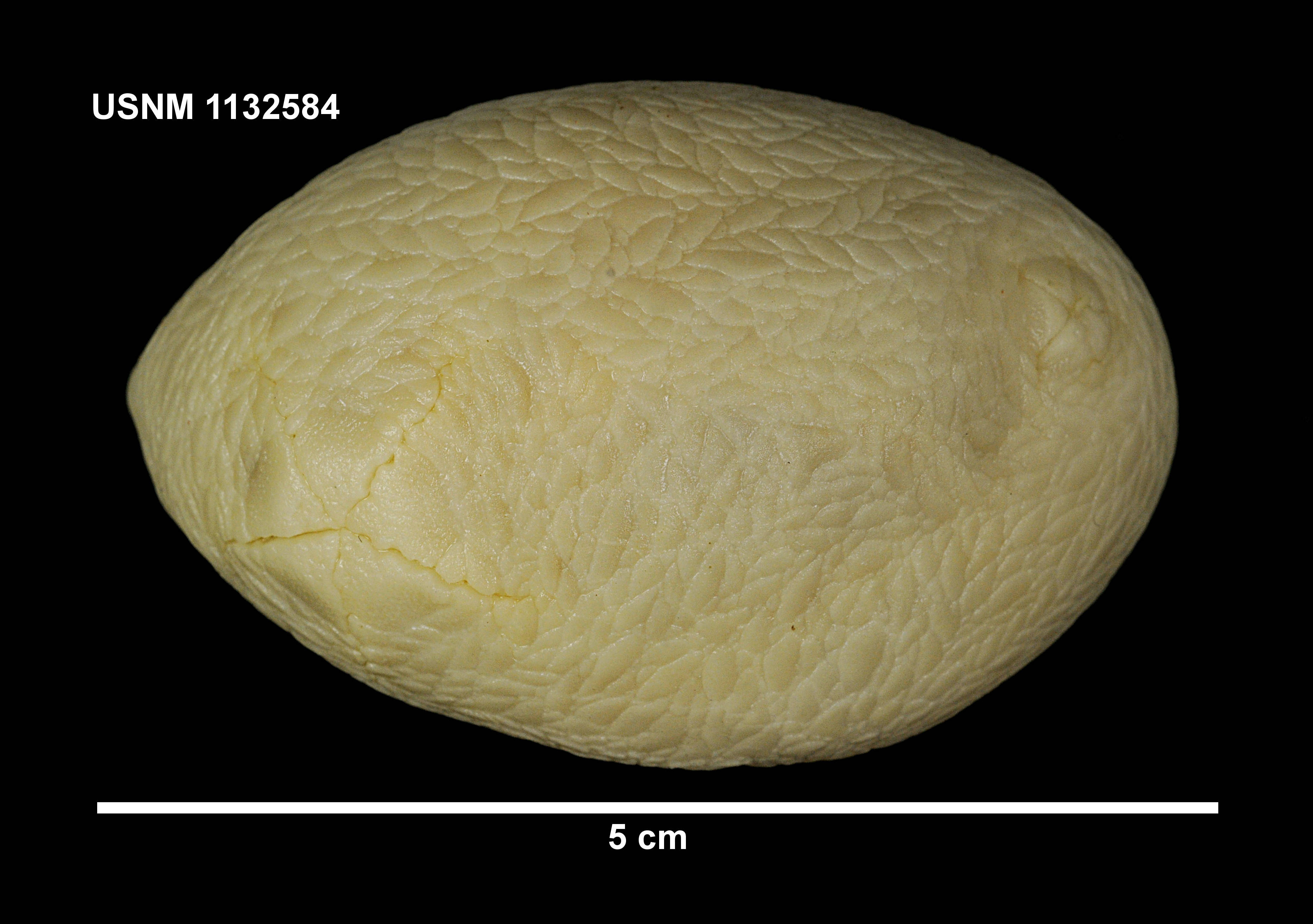
Psolus dubiosus.

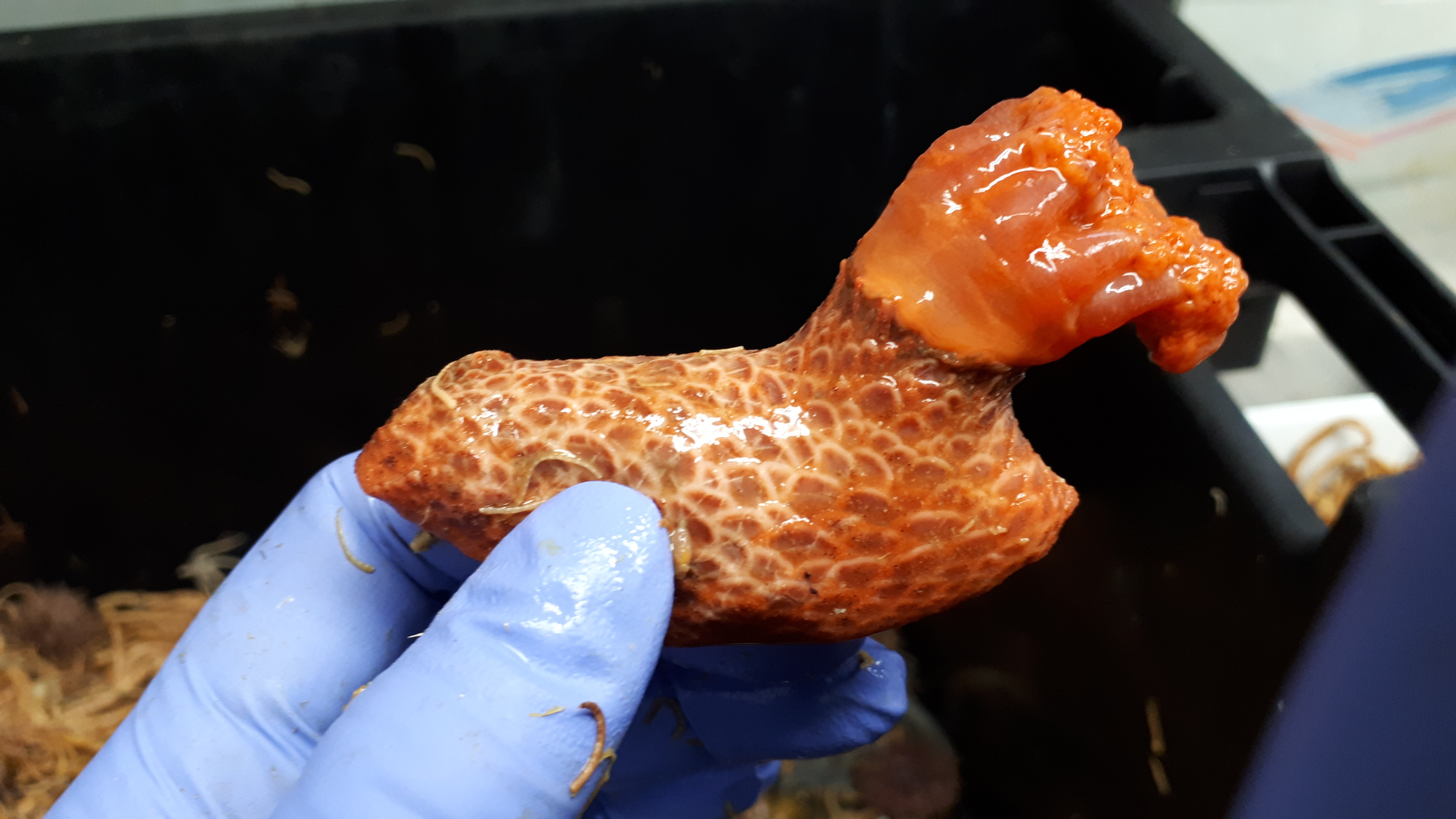
Psolus fabricii

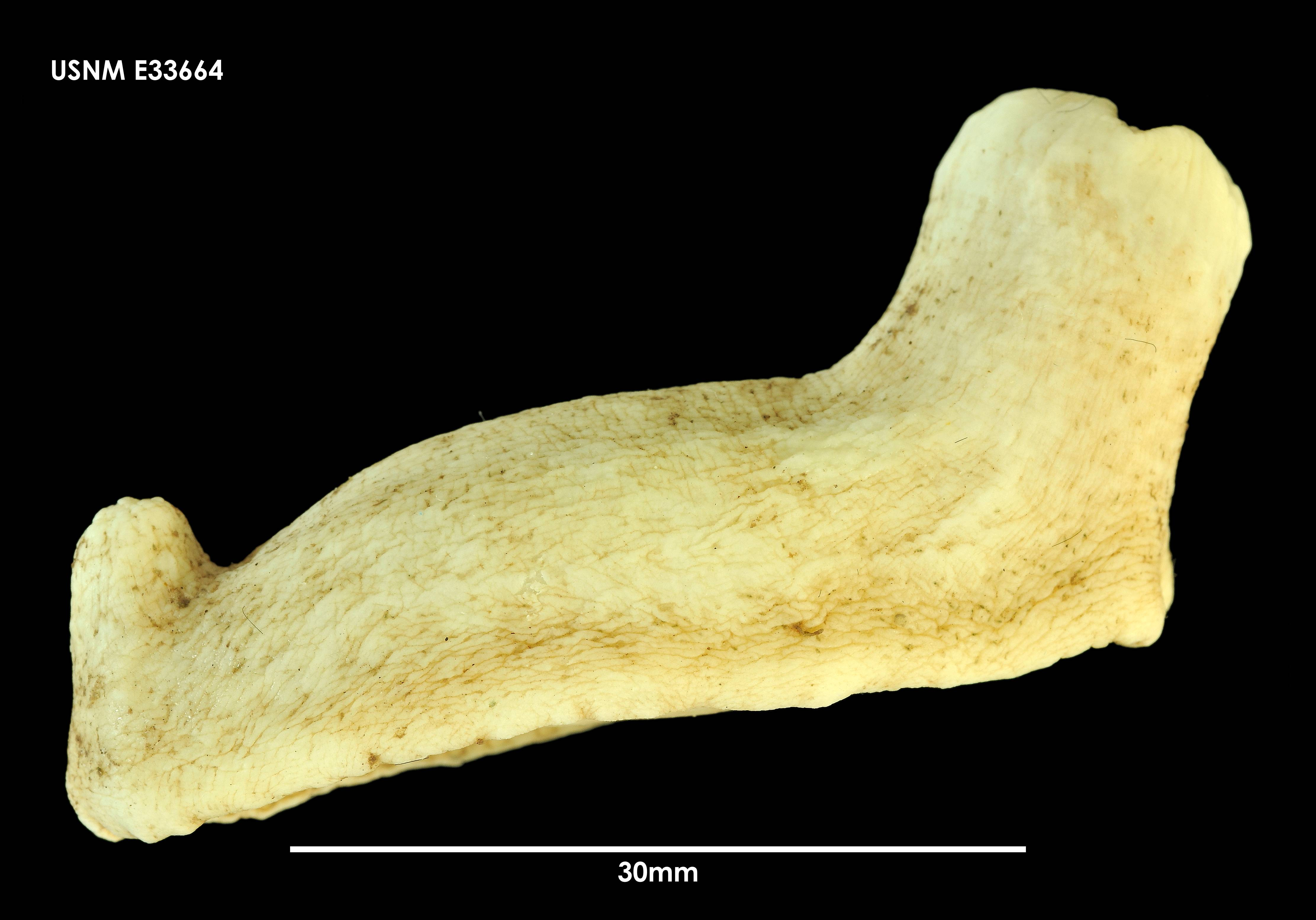
Psolus koehleri.

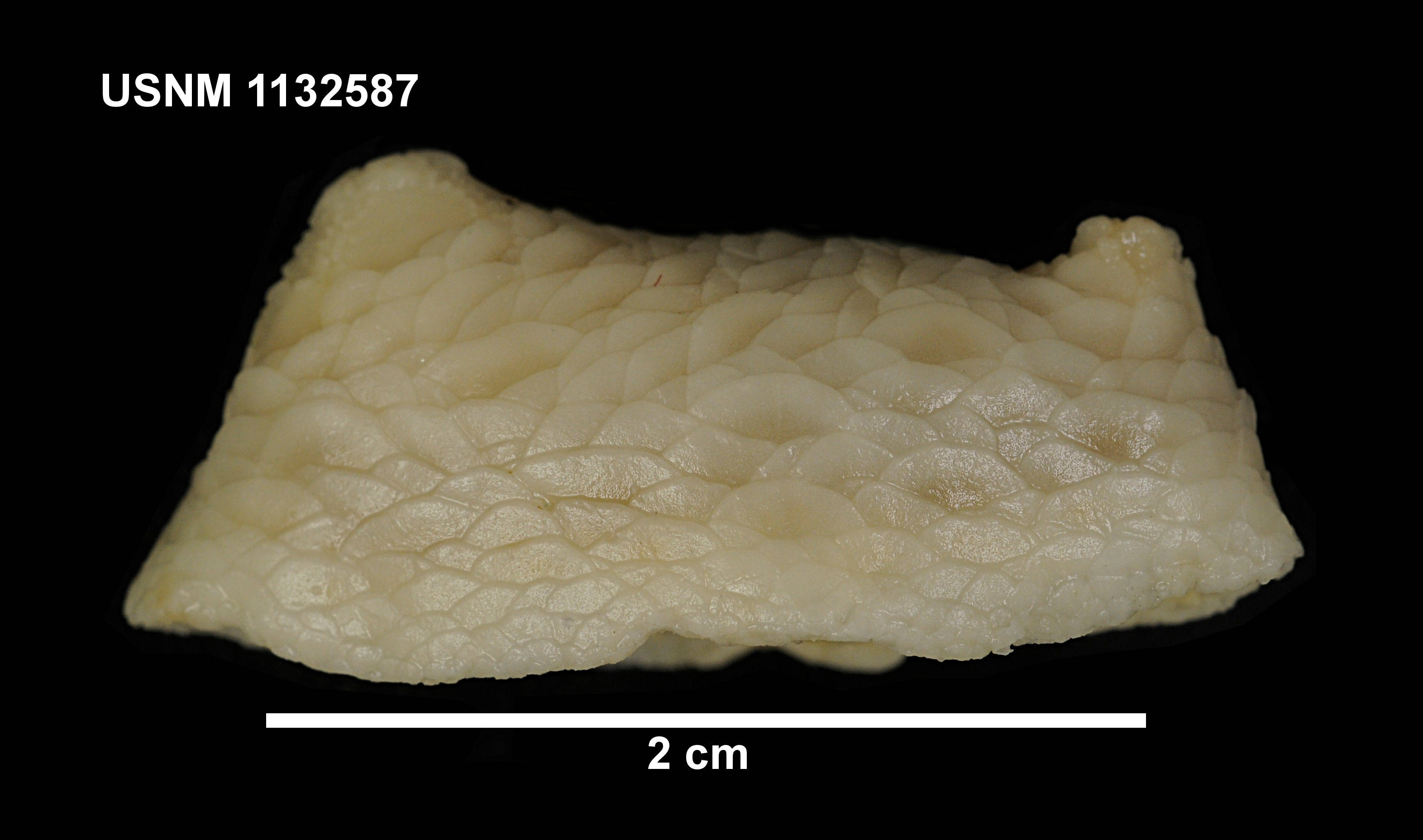
Psolus patagonicus.

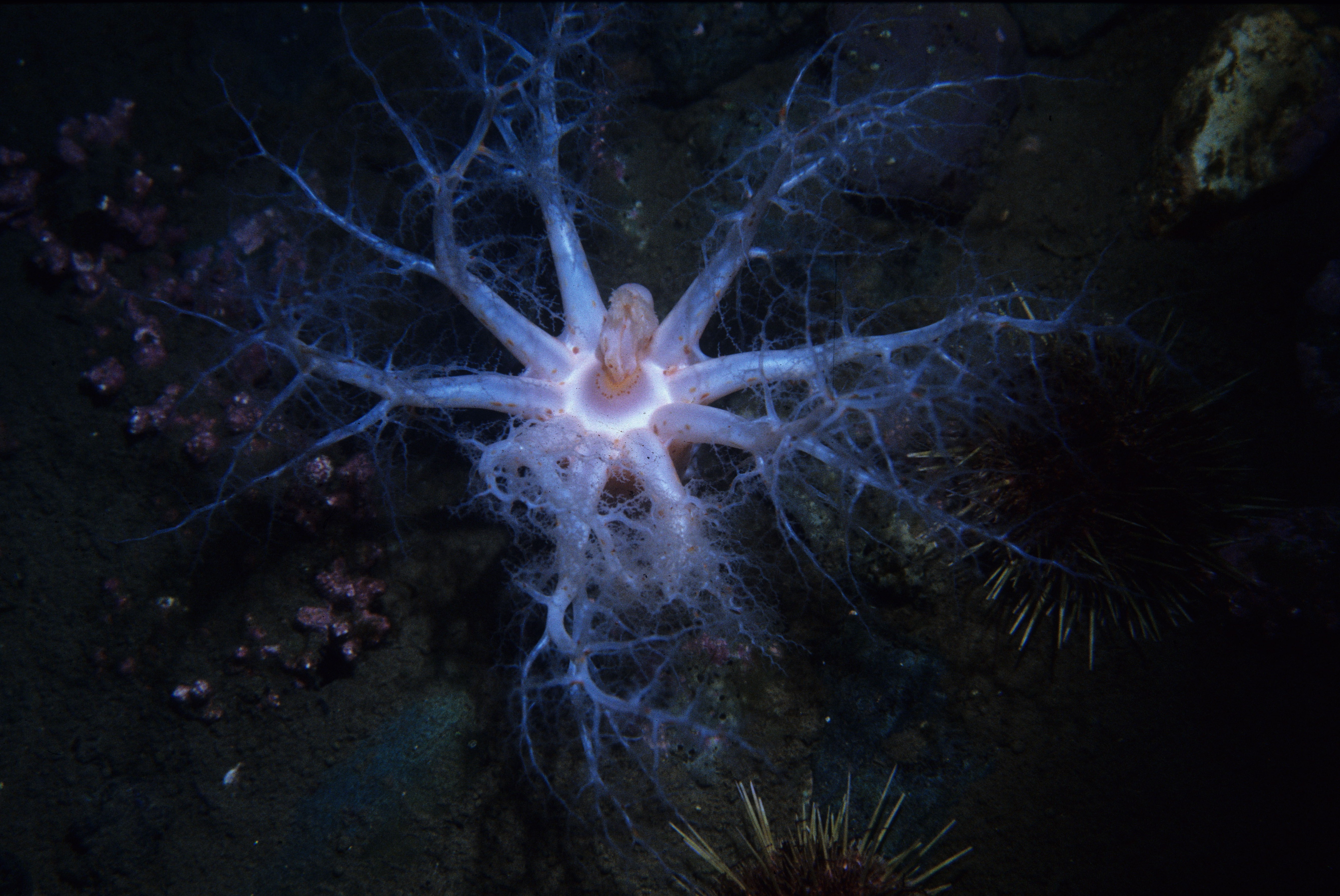
Psolus phantapus.

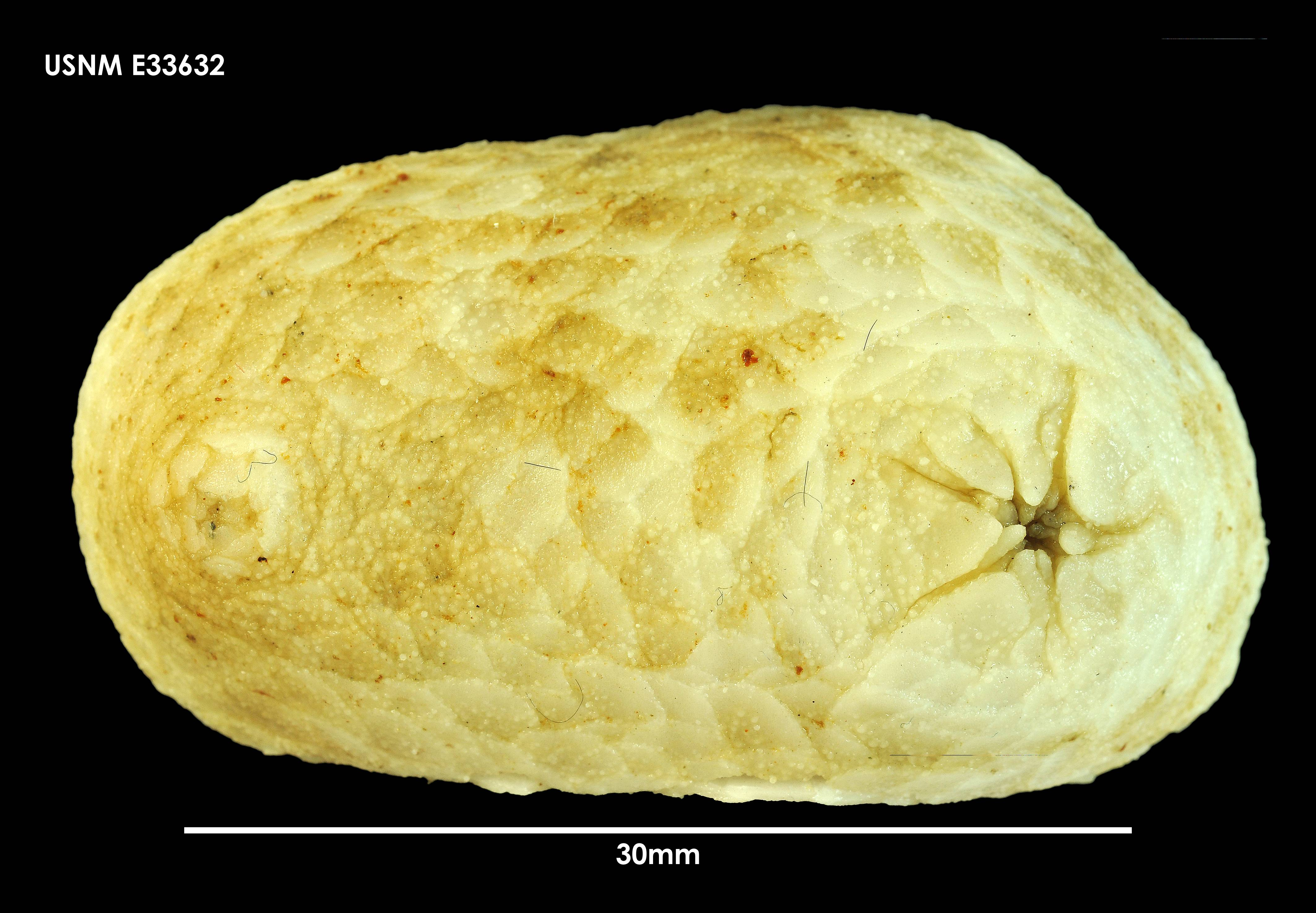
Psolus squamatus.

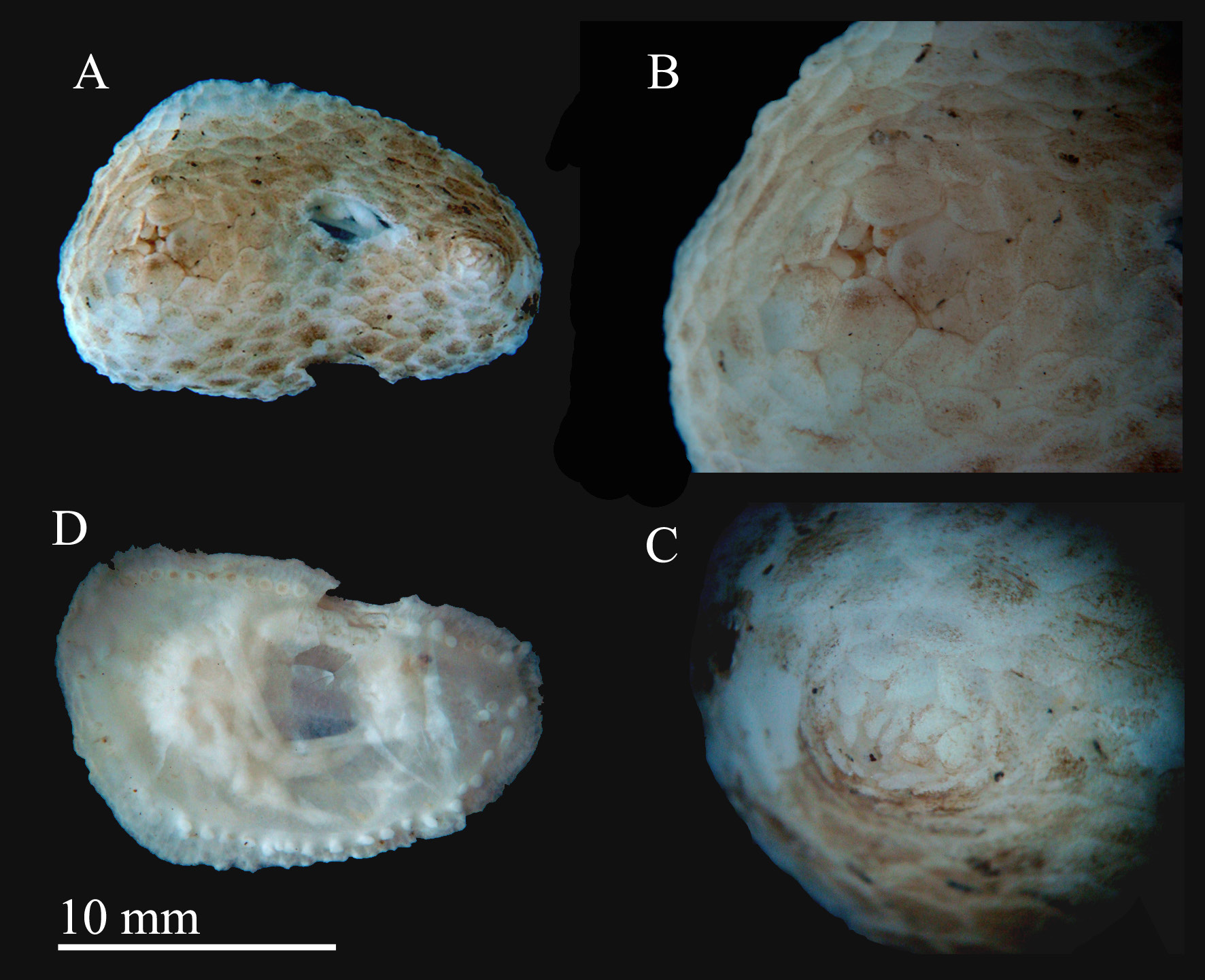
Psolus tessellatus.
