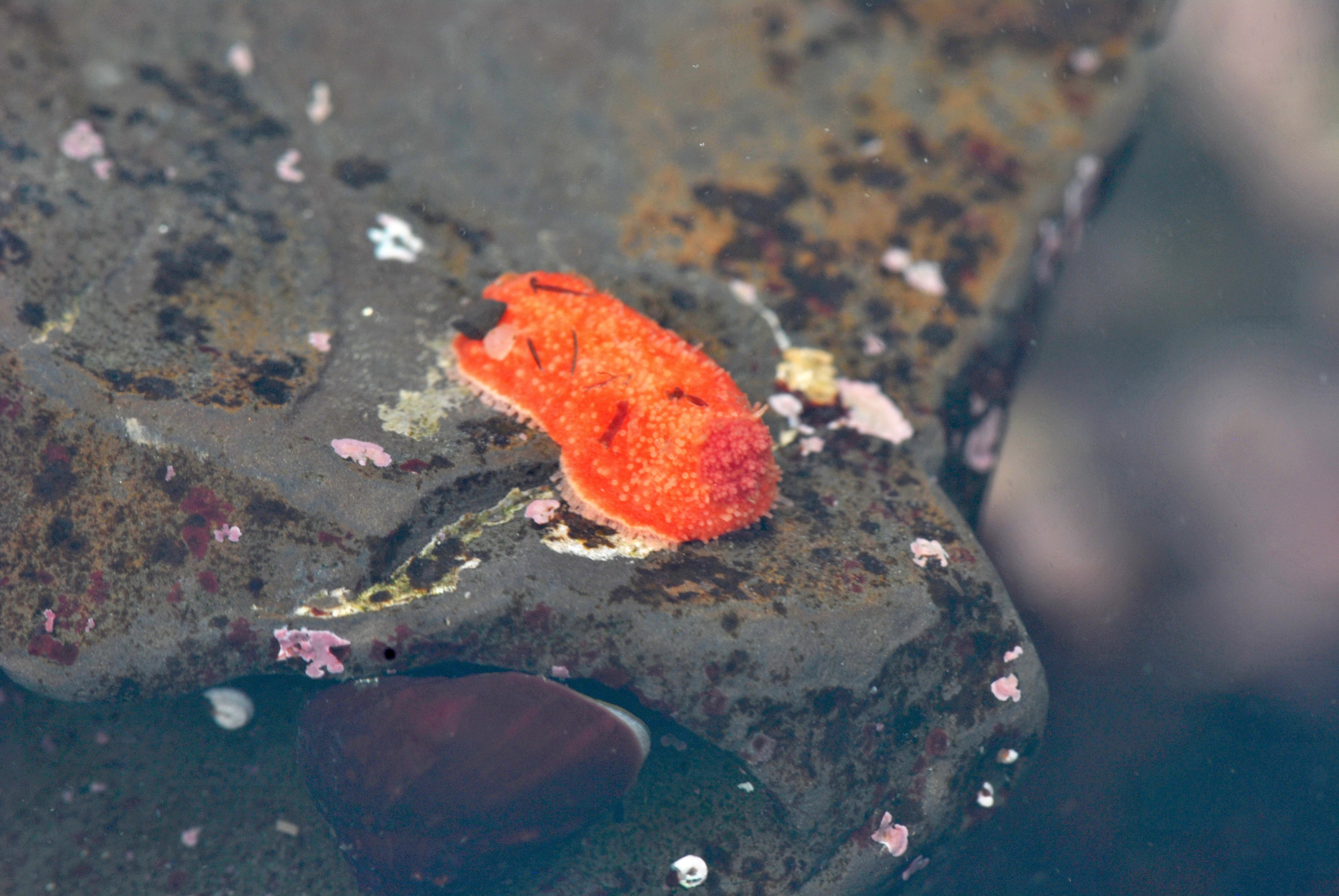
- Dwarf sea cucumber clinging to a rock at the bottom of a tide pool

Scientific classification
- Kingdom: Animalia
- Phylum: Echinodermata
- Class: Holothuroidea
- Order: Dendrochirotida
- Family: Psolidae
- Genus: Lissothuria
- Species: L. nutriens

Binomial name
- Lissothuria nutriens Brandt, 1835

= Lissothuria nutriens =

Species of sea cucumber

Lissothuria nutriens, commonly known as the dwarf sea cucumber or scarlet sea cucumber, is a bright red-orange sea cucumber that can be found in tide pools along much of the California coast.

== Description ==
The dorsal surface is bright red-orange with small white tube feet evenly spread about. The lower surface or foot is pinkish and has rows of white tube feet. It grows to about 2 cm. Surrounding its mouth, it has 2 small and 8 large pinkish red dendritic tentacles. The flesh surrounding its mouth contains a few plates.

== Range ==
Lissothuria nutriens can be found from Monterey Bay to Southern California, and have been found as far north as Point Arena-Stornetta Public Lands.

== Habitat ==
Lissothuria nutriens can be found clinging to or moving across a rocky substrate or in sandy areas between alga holdfasts from the low intertidal to 20 meters deep. Based on the observations on iNaturalist it can also be found on various kinds of alga.

== Diet ==
Lissothuria nutriens extends its sticky, dendritic tentacles to catch plankton. The tentacles then move the captured prey down its branches toward its base and into its mouth. It absorbs additional nutrients that it extracts from mud.

== Reproduction ==
Lissothuria nutriens broods a small number of large eggs by moving them to pits on its dorsal surface. As a member of the order Dendrochirotida, the eggs have sufficient energy to enable the larvae to complete their development without needing to be fed.
