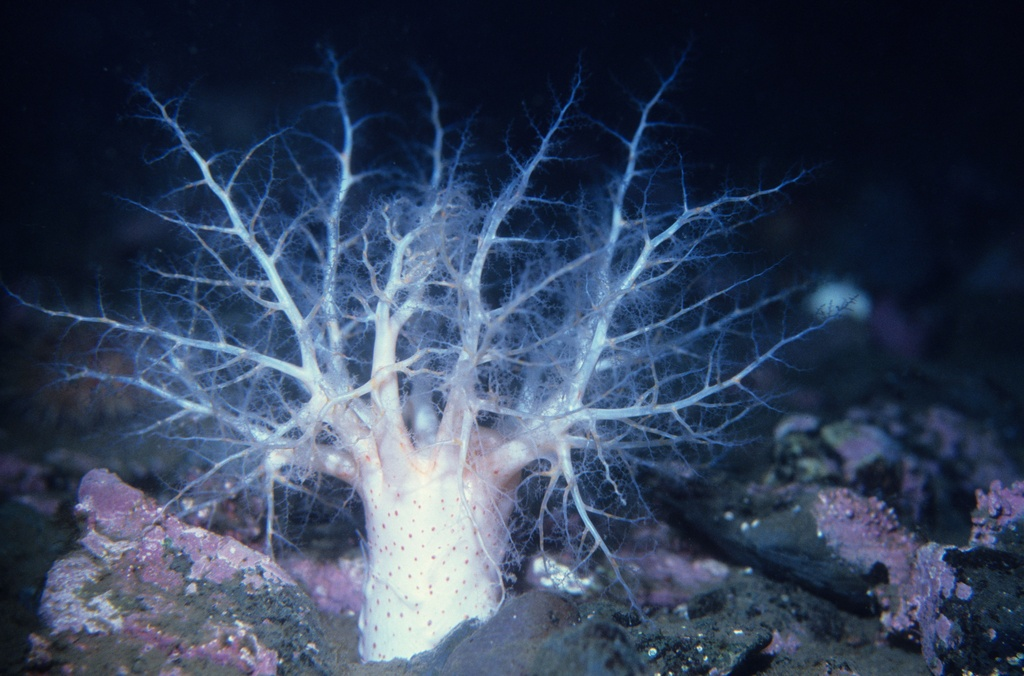

Conservation status
- Secure (NatureServe)

Scientific classification
- Kingdom: Animalia
- Phylum: Echinodermata
- Class: Holothuroidea
- Order: Dendrochirotida
- Family: Psolidae
- Genus: Psolus
- Species: P. phantapus

Binomial name
- Psolus phantapus Strussenfelt, 1765

Synonyms
- Holothuria phantapus Strussenfelt, 1765; Holothuria phantapus Müller, 1776; Holothuria phantapus Linnaeus, 1767; Psolus granulatus Ayres, 1851; Psolus laevigatus Ayres, 1851; Psolus regalis Verrill, 1866

= Psolus phantapus =

Species of sea cucumber

Psolus phantapus, also known as the brown psolus, is a species of sea cucumber in the family Psolidae.

== Description ==
Psolus phantapus have cylindrically body arched at both ends to form a U shape. They grow up to 200 mm in length. They have a rectangular ventral sole at the base where tube feet concentrate. Their colour range from yellowish brown to dark brown and black.

== Habitat ==
Psolus phantapus are epifaunal and use the ventral sole to attach themselves. They are found at 4-500 m depth.

== Diet ==
They are deposit feeders. They have ten bushy orange tentacles that collect food from water.

== Reproduction ==
They reproduce sexually. Breeding season is February-march.

== Distribution ==
They are found in Arctic and Atlantic ocean.
