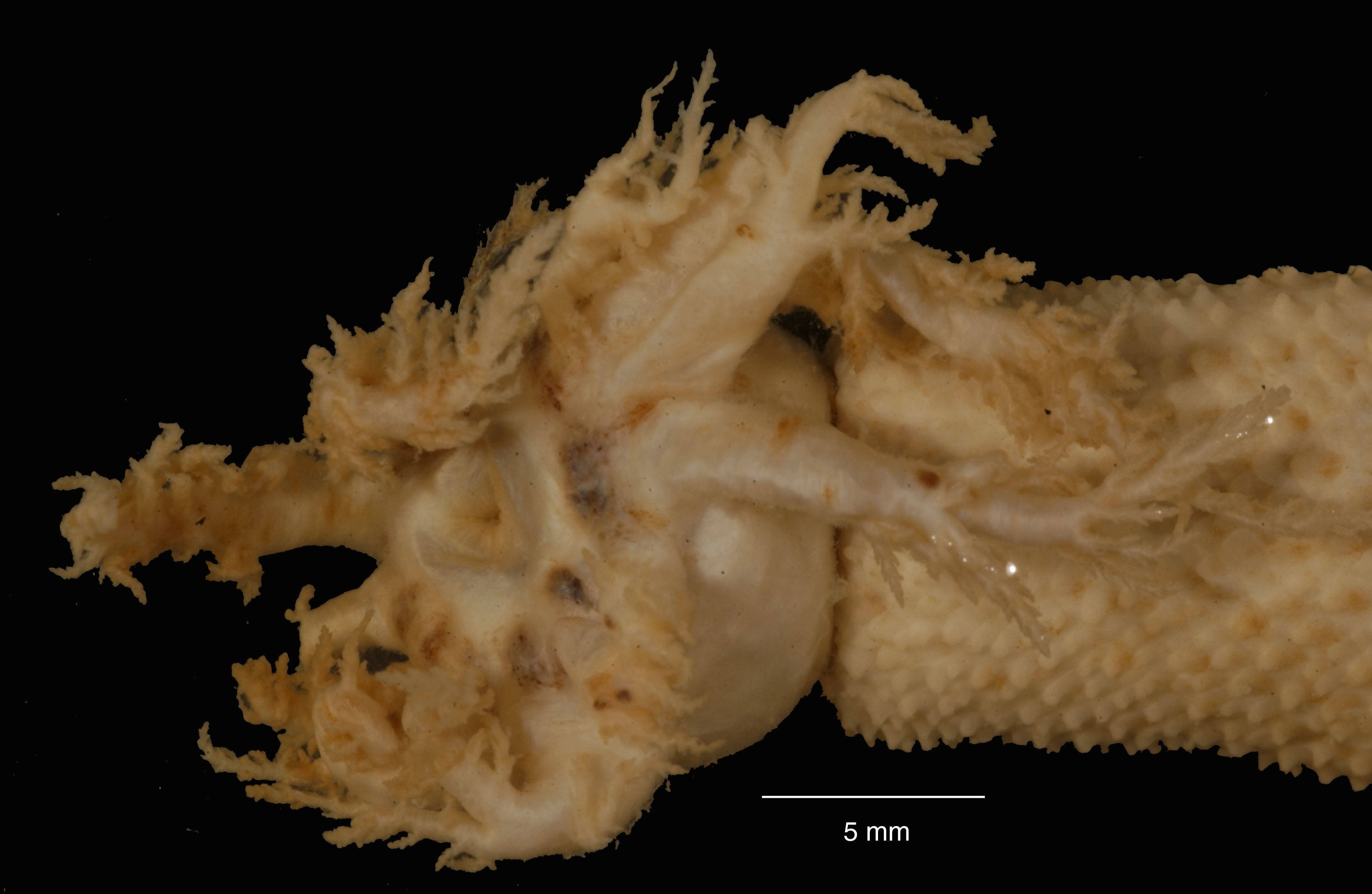
- Paracucumis turricata

Scientific classification
- Kingdom: Animalia
- Phylum: Echinodermata
- Class: Holothuroidea
- Order: Dendrochirotida
- Family: Paracucumidae; Pawson & Fell, 1965

= Paracucumidae =

Family of sea cucumbers

Paracucumidae is a family of sea cucumbers belonging to the order Dendrochirotida.

Genera:

- Crucella Gutt, 1990
- Paracucumis Mortensen, 1925
