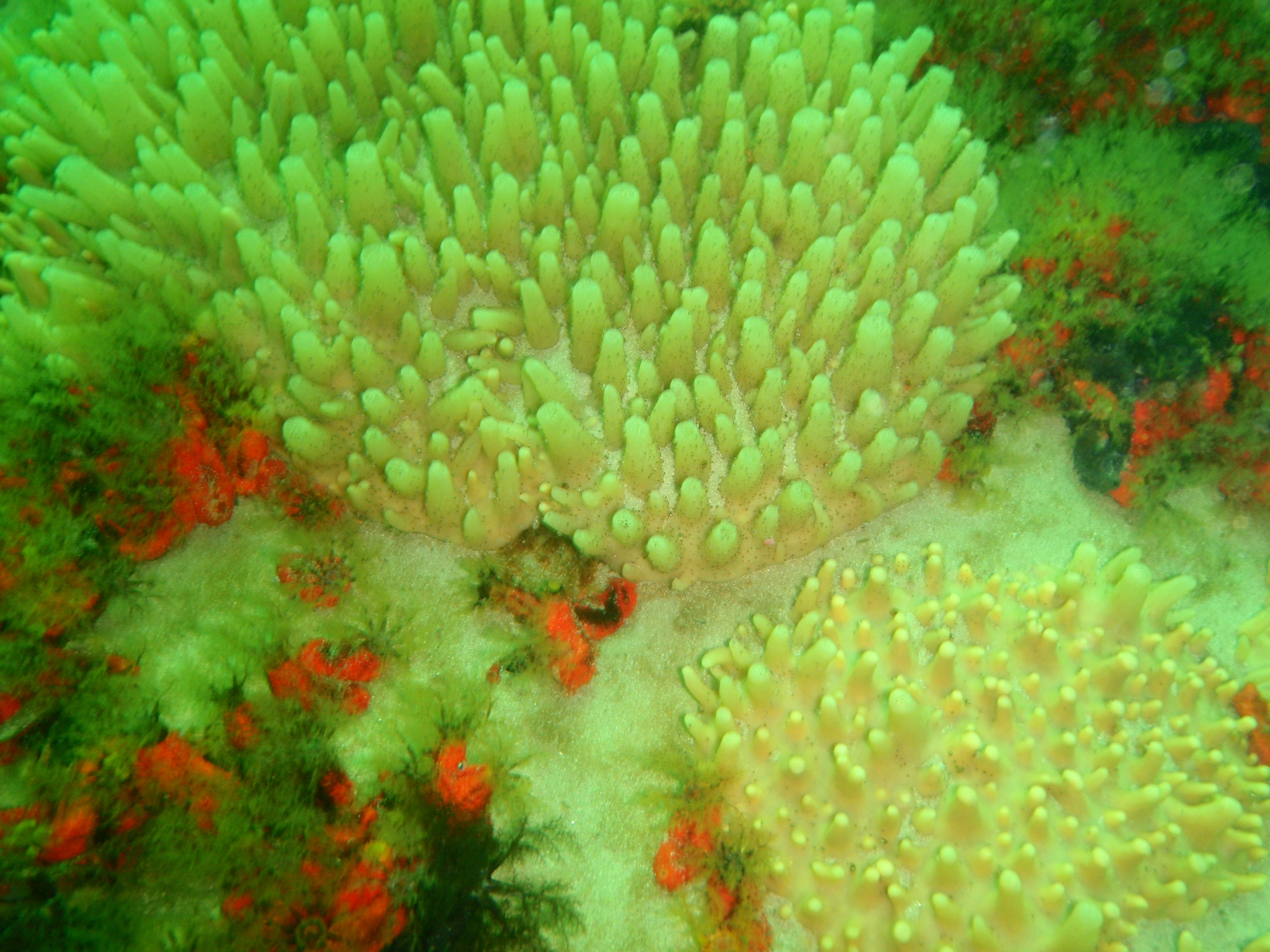

Scientific classification
- Kingdom: Animalia
- Phylum: Echinodermata
- Class: Holothuroidea
- Order: Dendrochirotida
- Family: Cucumariidae
- Genus: Hemiocnus insolens (Théel, 1886)

Synonyms
- Cucumaria insolens Théel, 1886; Cucumaria leonina var. africana Britten, 1910; Pseudocnella insolens (Théel, 1886)

= Hemiocnus insolens =

Species of sea cucumber

Hemiocnus insolens is a species of sea cucumber from the family Cucumariidae. It is found along the coast of south-western Africa, ranging east to Port Elizabeth.
