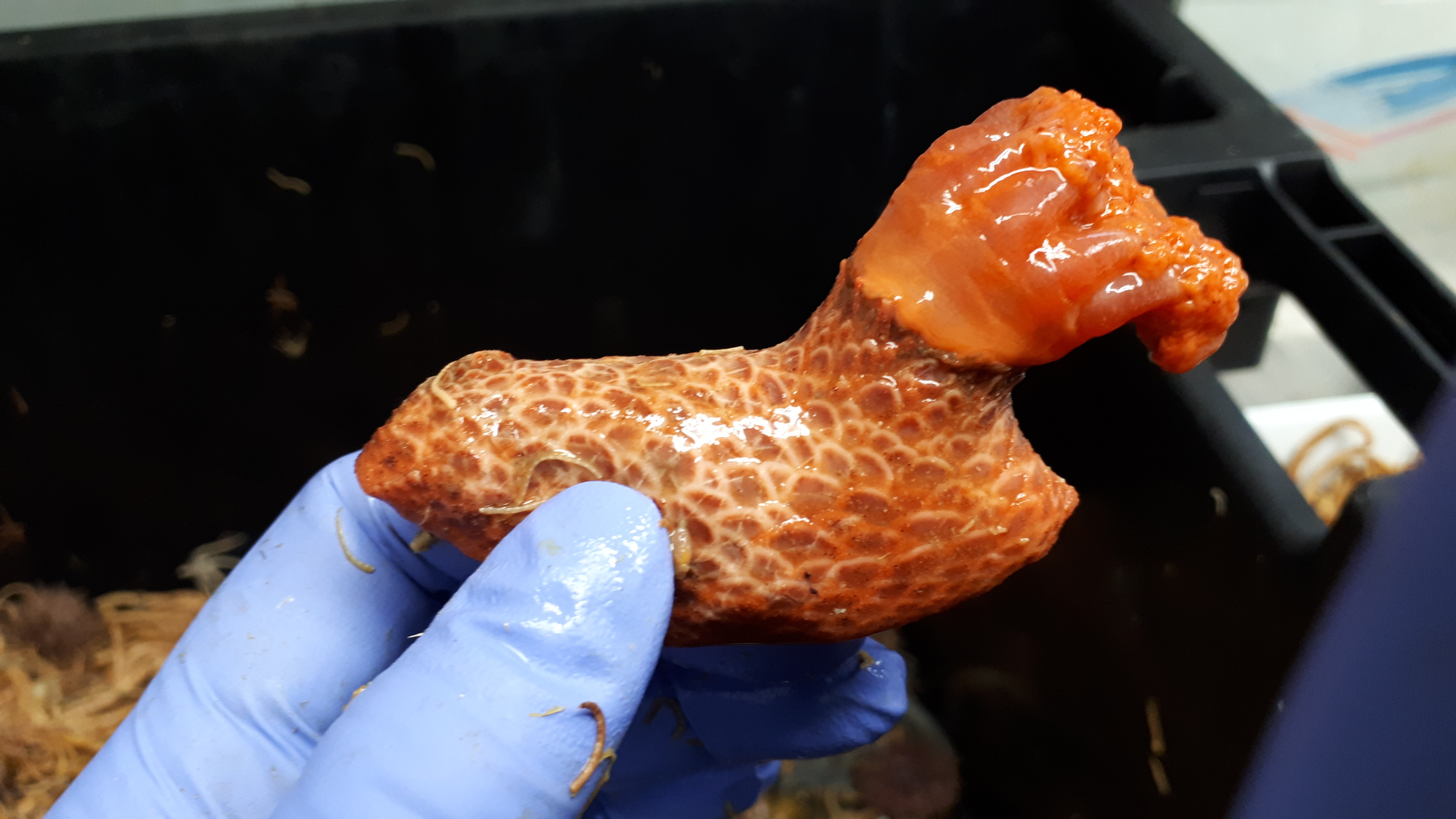

Conservation status
- Least Concern (IUCN 3.1)

Scientific classification
- Kingdom: Animalia
- Phylum: Echinodermata
- Class: Holothuroidea
- Order: Dendrochirotida
- Family: Psolidae
- Genus: Psolus
- Species: P. fabricii

Binomial name
- Psolus fabricii (Düben & Koren, 1846)

= Psolus fabricii =

Species of sea cucumber

Psolus fabricii, the scarlet sea cucumber, is a species of sea cucumber, found primarily in arctic regions of Canada, Alaska, Russia, and Scandinavia.
