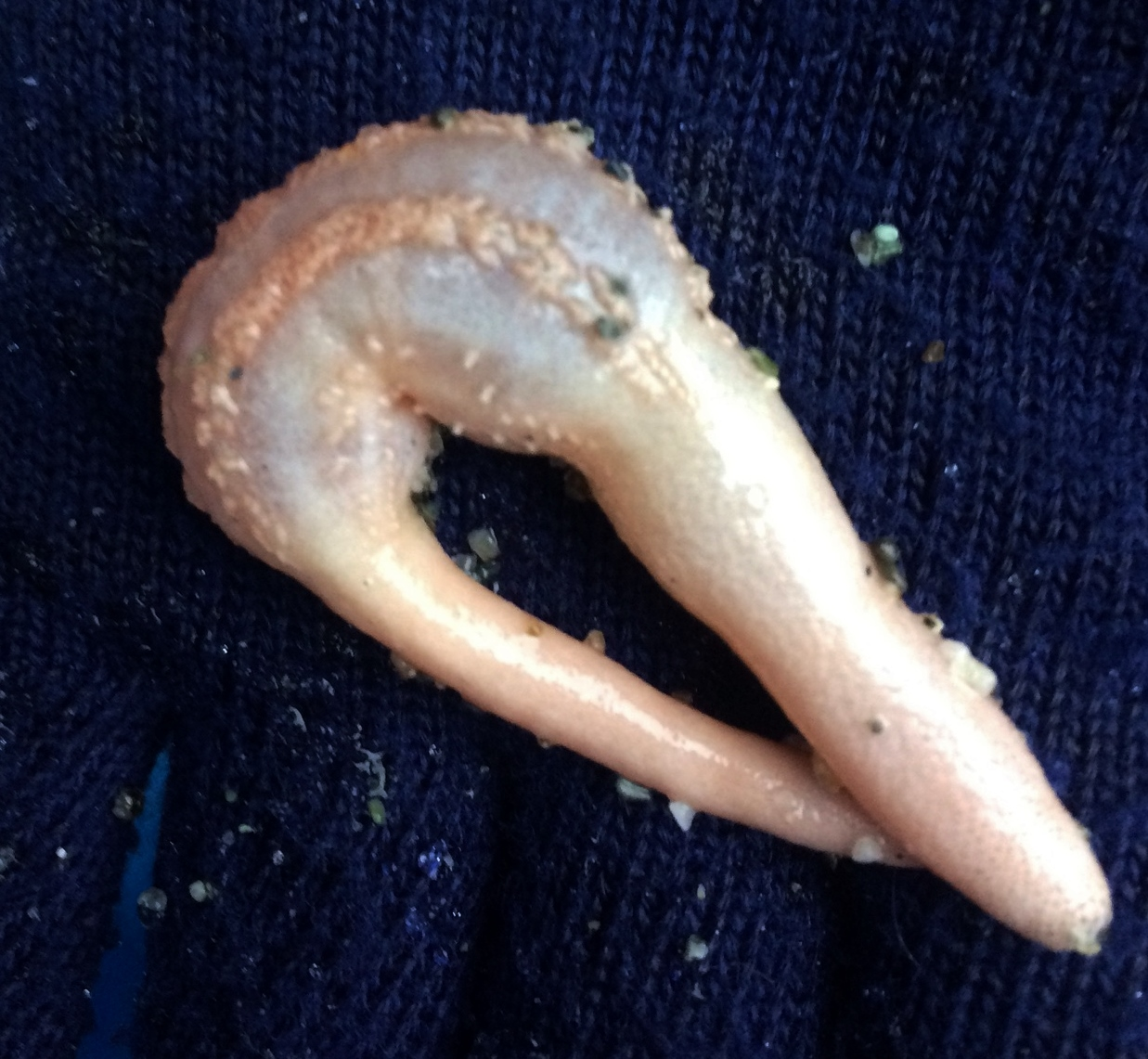
- Heterothyone ocnoides

Scientific classification
- Domain: Eukaryota
- Kingdom: Animalia
- Phylum: Echinodermata
- Class: Holothuroidea
- Order: Dendrochirotida
- Family: Heterothyonidae; Pawson, 1970

= Heterothyonidae =

Family of sea cucumbers

Heterothyonidae is a family of sea cucumbers belonging to the order Dendrochirotida.

The following genera are recognised in the family Heterothyonidae:

- Heterothyone Panning, 1949
- †Strobilothyone Smith & Gallemí, 1991
