= Placothuria =

Scientific classification
- Kingdom: Animalia
- Phylum: Echinodermata
- Class: Holothuroidea
- Order: Dendrochirotida
- Family: Placothuriidae; Pawson & Fell, 1965
- Genus: Placothuria; Pawson & Fell, 1965

Genus of sea cucumbers

Placothuria is a genus of sea cucumbers belonging to the monotypic family Placothuriidae.

The species of this genus are found in Australia and New Zealand.

Species:

- Placothuria huttoni (Dendy, 1897)
- Placothuria molpadioides (Semper, 1867)
- Placothuria squamata Pawson, 1968
