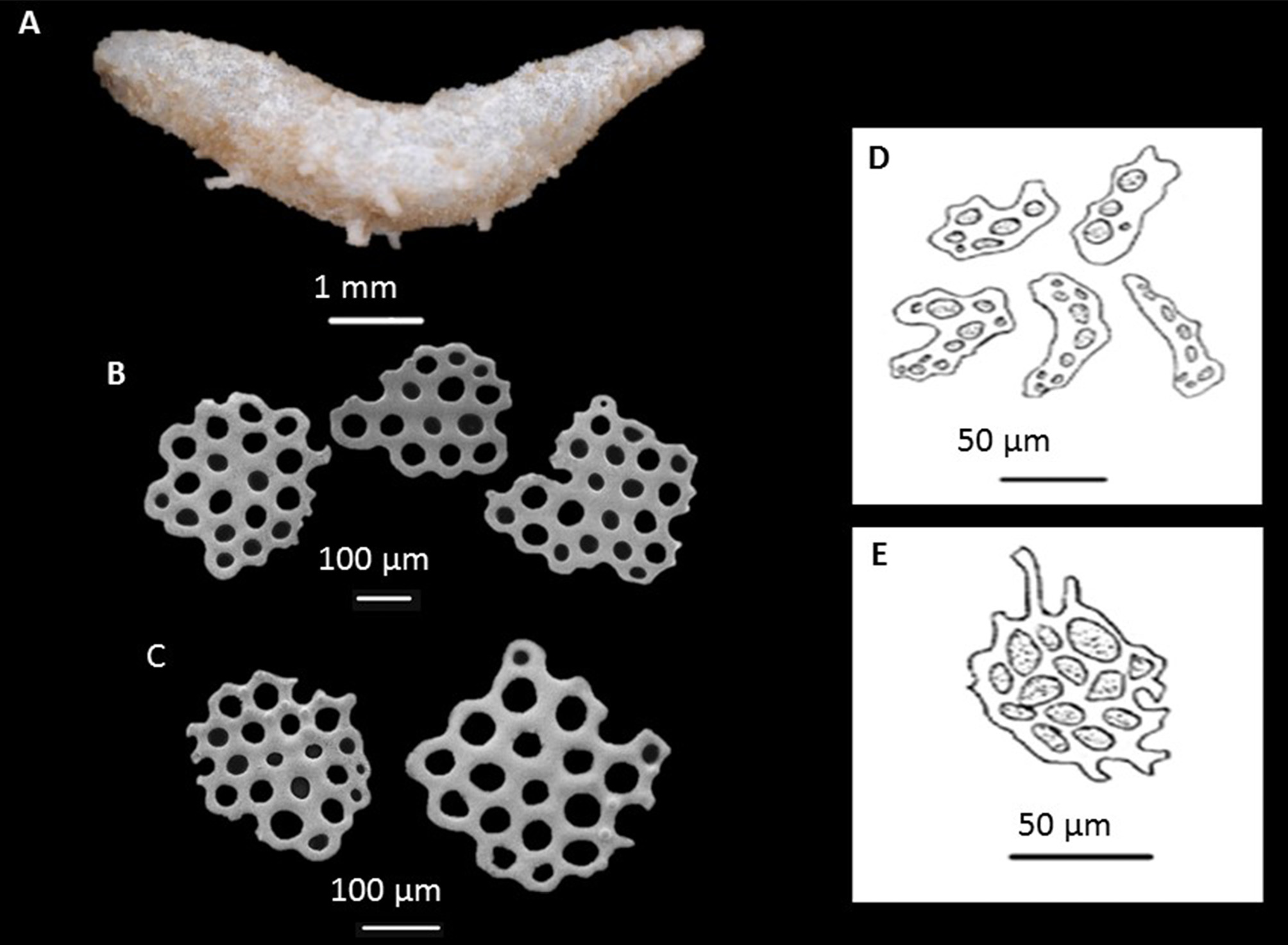

Scientific classification
- Kingdom: Animalia
- Phylum: Echinodermata
- Class: Holothuroidea
- Order: Dendrochirotida
- Family: Vaneyellidae; Pawson & Fell, 1965

= Vaneyellidae =

Family of sea cucumbers

Vaneyellidae is a family of sea cucumbers belonging to the order Dendrochirotida.

Genera:

- Mitsukuriella Heding & Panning, 1954
- Psolidothuria Thandar, 1998
- Vaneyella Heding & Panning, 1954
