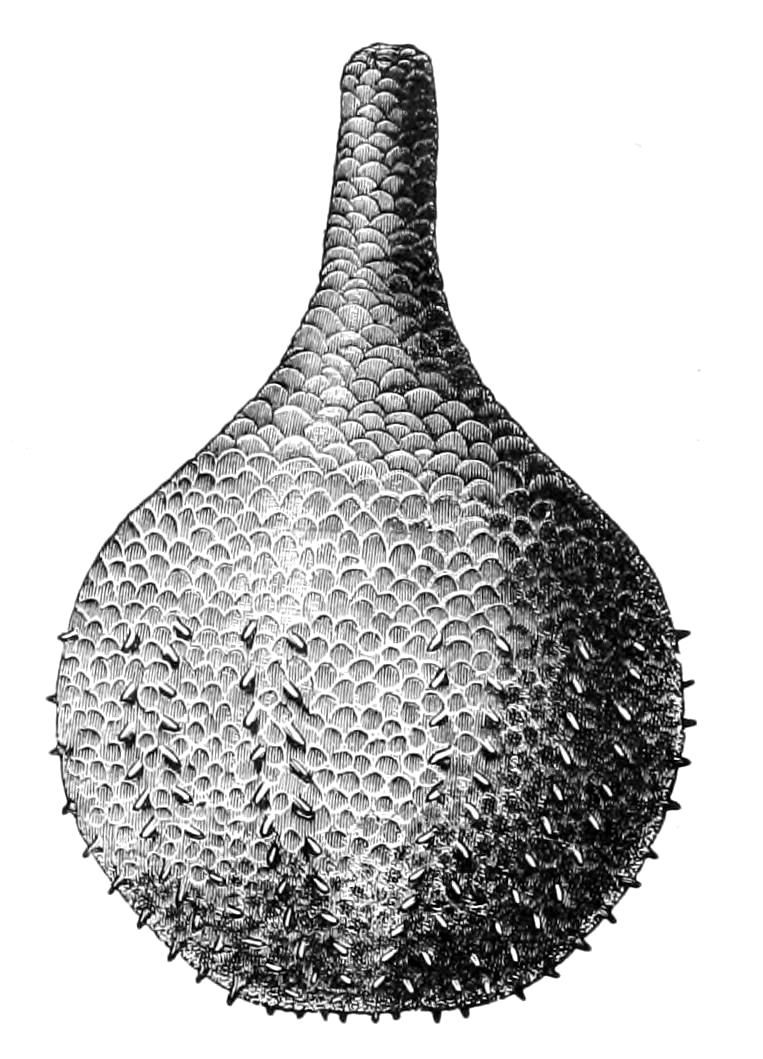

Scientific classification
- Kingdom: Animalia
- Phylum: Echinodermata
- Class: Holothuroidea
- Order: Dendrochirotida
- Family: Rhopalodinidae; Théel, 1886

Synonyms
- Rhopalodinidae Perrier, 1902

= Rhopalodinidae =

Family of sea cucumbers

Rhopalodinidae is a family of sea cucumbers belonging to the order Dendrochirotida.

Genera:

- Rhopalodina Gray, 1853
- Rhopalodinaria Cherbonnier, 1970
- Rhopalodinopsis Heding, 1937
