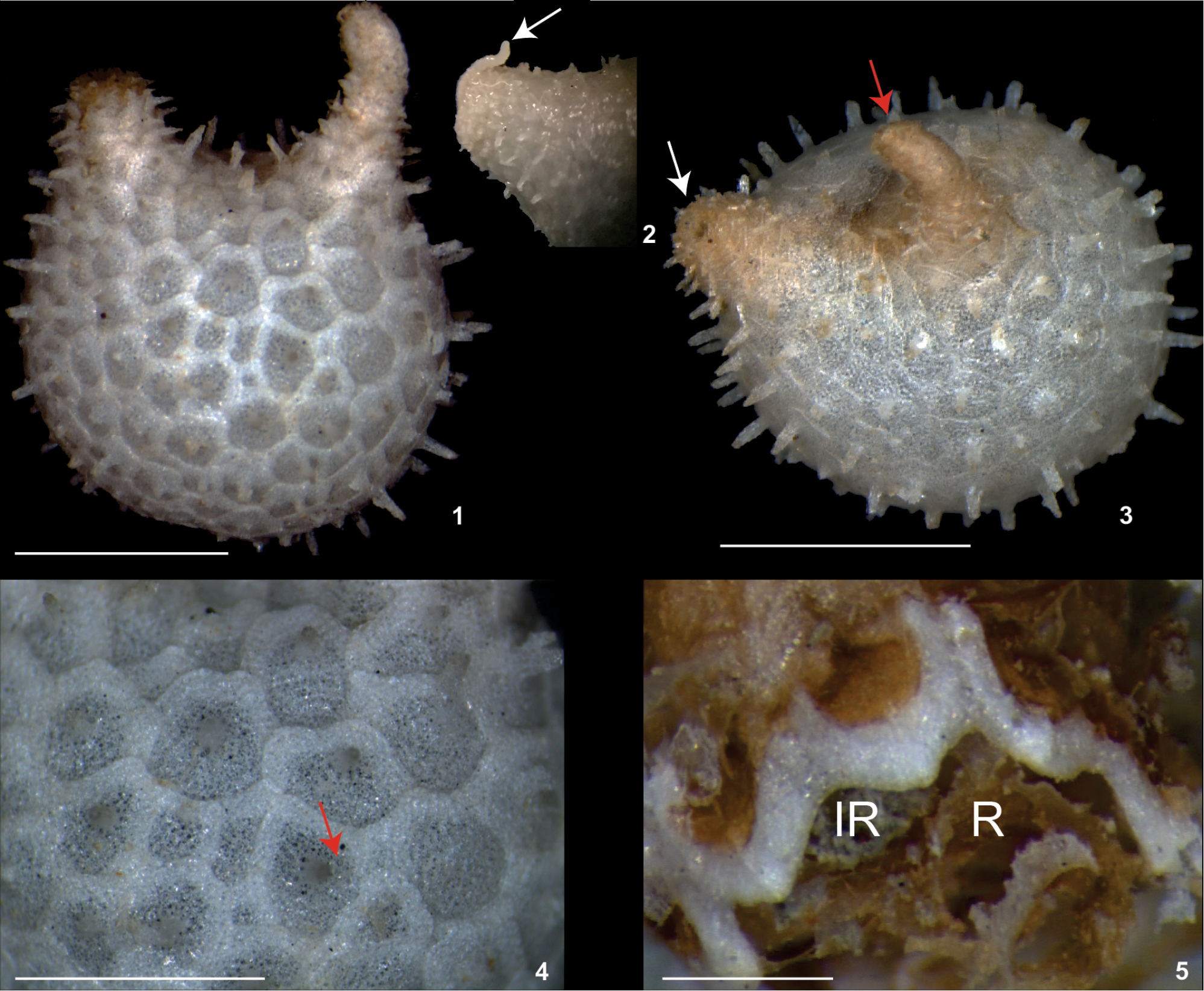
- Ypsilothuria bitentaculata

Scientific classification
- Domain: Eukaryota
- Kingdom: Animalia
- Phylum: Echinodermata
- Class: Holothuroidea
- Order: Dendrochirotida
- Family: Ypsilothuriidae; Heding, 1942

= Ypsilothuriidae =

Family of sea cucumbers

Ypsilothuriidae is a family of sea cucumbers belonging to the order Dendrochirotida.

Genera:

- Echinocucumis Sars, 1859
- Tripuscucumis Reich, 2003
- Ypsilocucumis Panning, 1949
- Ypsilothuria Perrier, 1886
