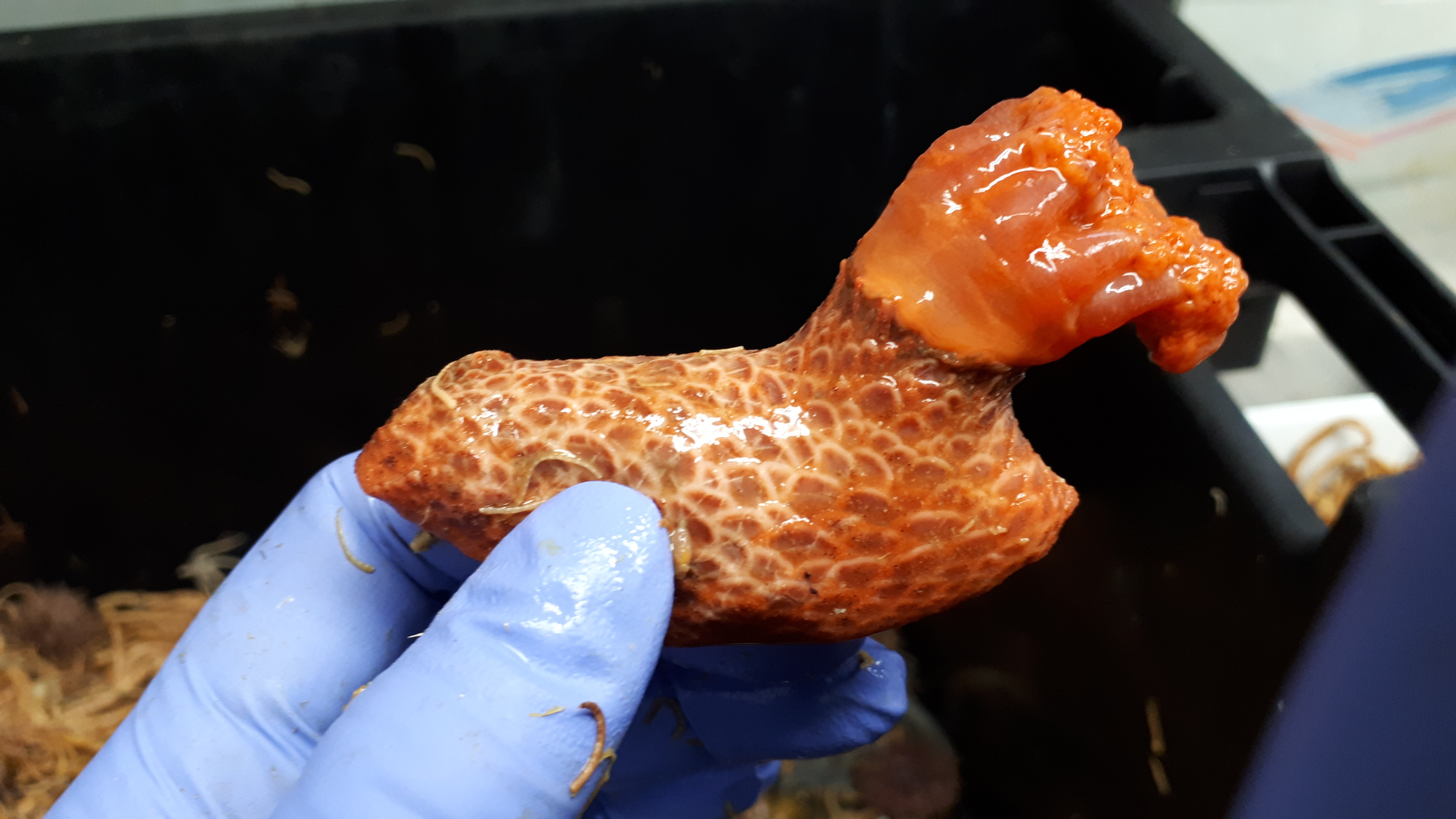
- Psolus fabricii

Scientific classification
- Kingdom: Animalia
- Phylum: Echinodermata
- Class: Holothuroidea
- Order: Dendrochirotida
- Family: Psolidae; Burmeister, 1837

Genera
- Ceto Gistel, 1848; Ekkentropelma Pawson, 1971; Lissothuria Verrill, 1867; Neopsolidium Pawson, 1964; Psolidium Ludwig, 1886; Psolus Oken, 1815

Synonyms
- Cuvieriadae Gray, 1842; Psolidae Forbes, 1841

= Psolidae =

Family of sea cucumbers

Psolidae is a family of sea cucumbers, marine animals with elongated bodies, leathery skins and tentacles that are found on the sea bed.

== Description ==
Members of the family Psolidae are small and inconspicuous sea cucumbers found in crevices and under boulders. They have a crown of branched tentacles, calcareous plates on the skin of the trunk and a basal sole that can move across the substrate. Some genera have papillae above but these are lacking in species of the genus Psolus.

== List of genera ==
- Ceto Gistel, 1848 -- 1 species
- Echinopsolus Gutt, 1990 -- 4 species
- Ekkentropelma Pawson, 1971 -- 2 species
- Lissothuria Verrill, 1867 -- 9 species
- Neopsolidium Pawson, 1964 -- 2 species
- Psolidium Ludwig, 1887 -- 51 species
- Psolus Jaeger, 1833 -- 55 species
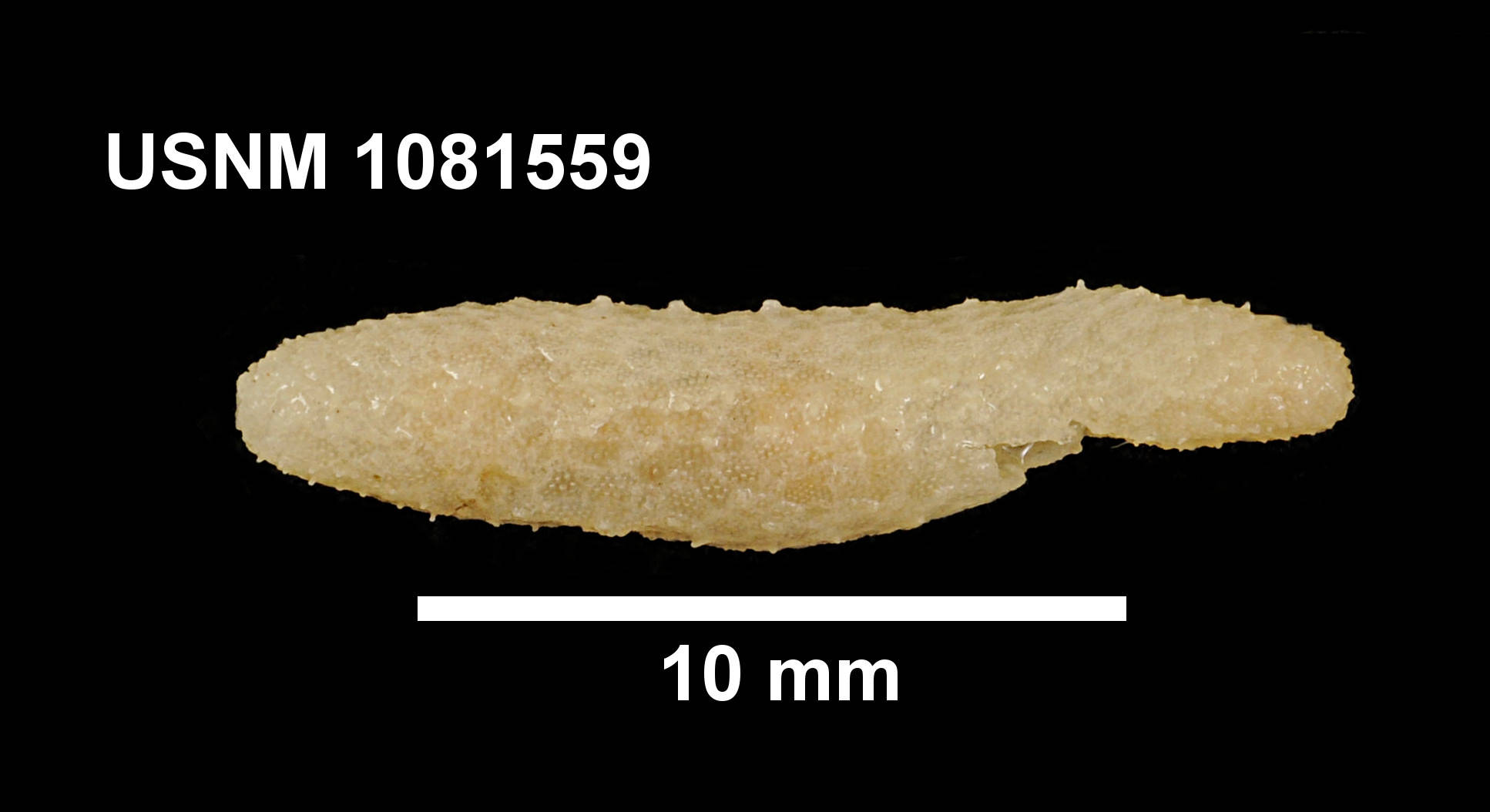
Ekkentropelma brychia

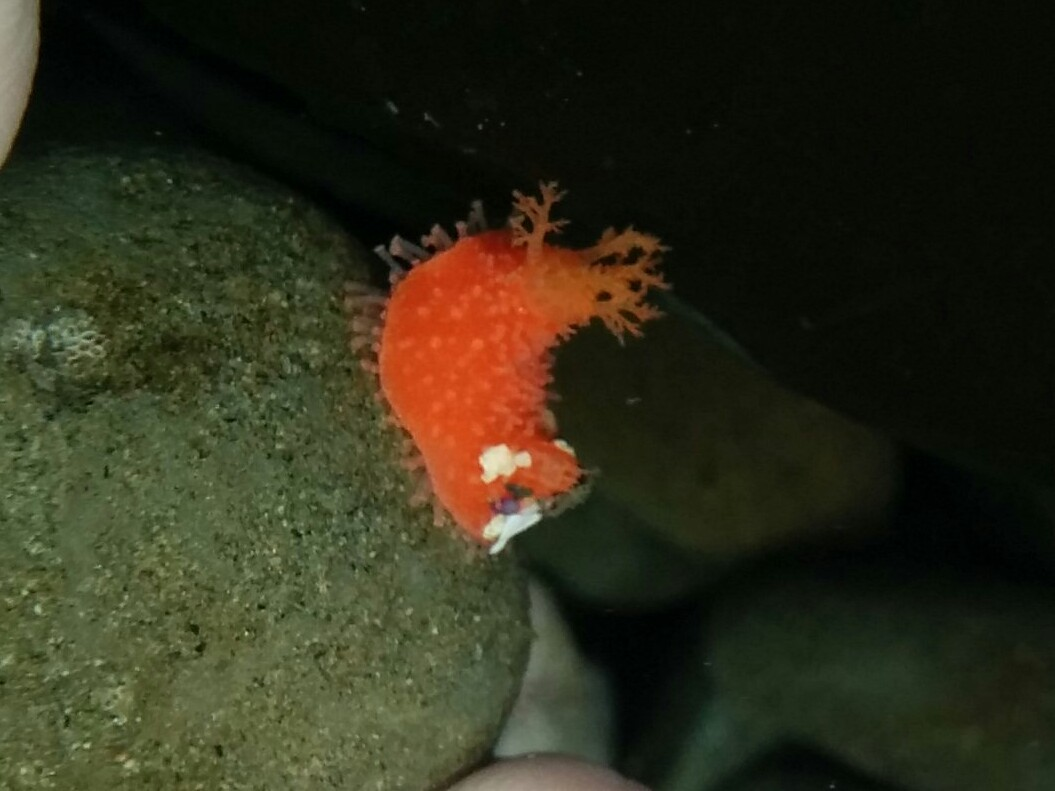
Lissothuria nutriens

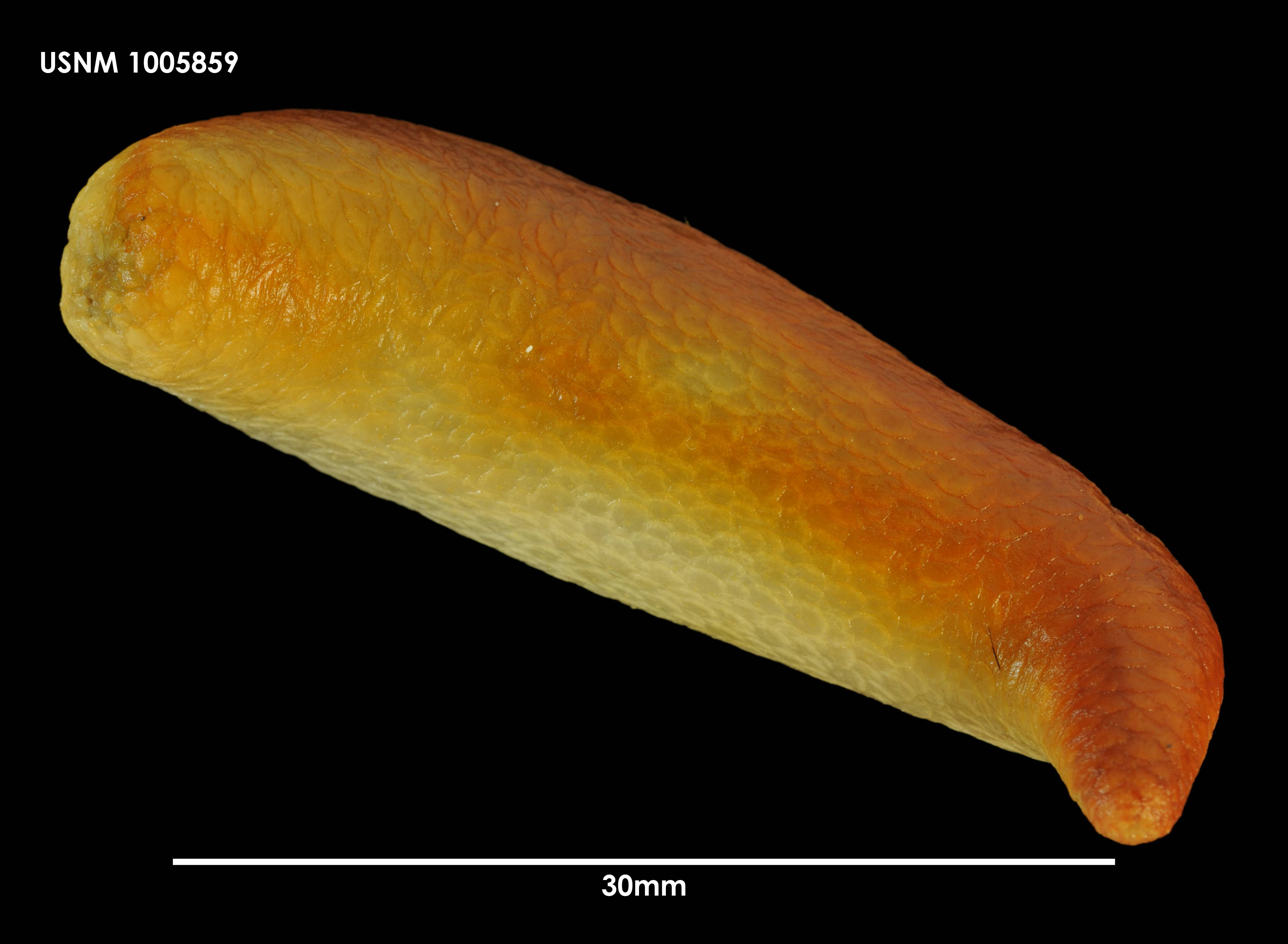
Psolidium tenue

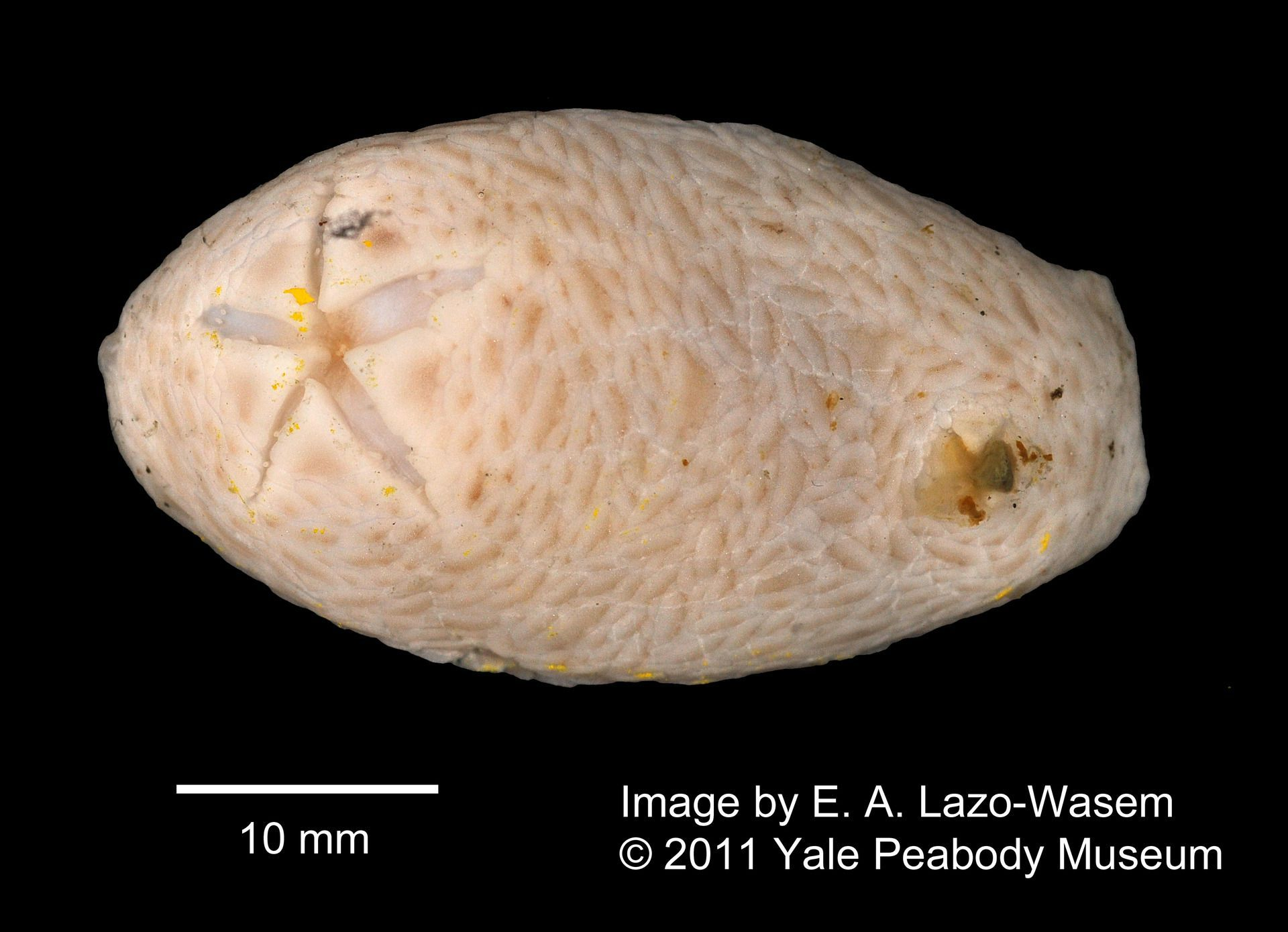
Psolus antarcticus

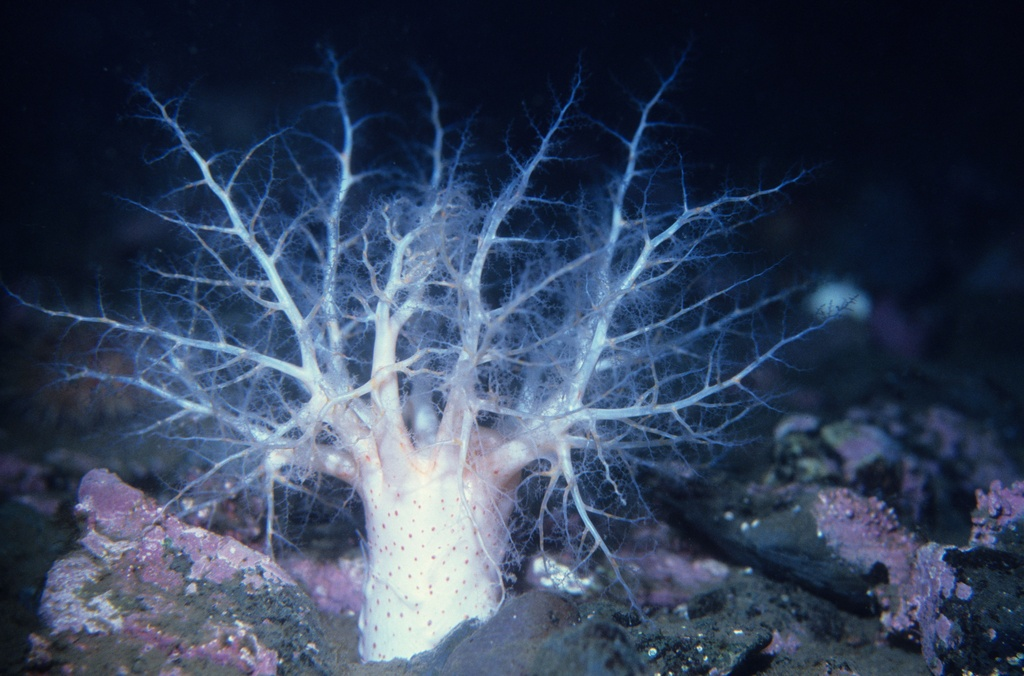
Psolus phantapus
