= Cucumella (echinoderm) =

Scientific classification
- Kingdom: Animalia
- Phylum: Echinodermata
- Class: Holothuroidea
- Order: Dendrochirotida
- Family: Cucumellidae; Thandar & Arumugam, 2011
- Genus: Cucumella; Heding, 1935

Genus of sea cucumbers

Cucumella is a genus of sea cucumbers belonging to the monotypic family Cucumellidae.

The species of this genus are found in South Africa and western Australia.

Species:

- Cucumella triperforata Thandar & Arumugam, 2011
- Cucumella triplex Ludwig & Heding, 1935
