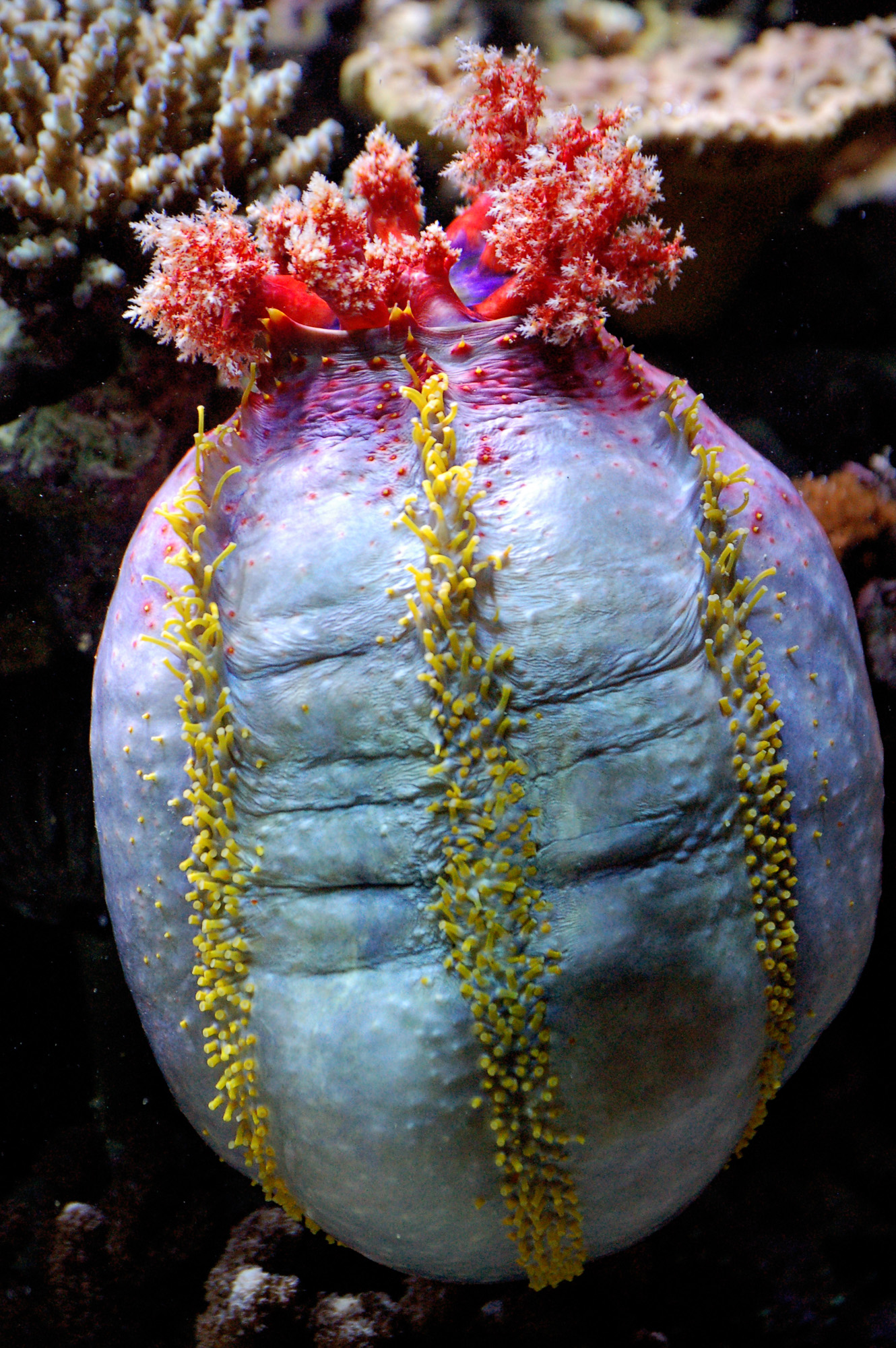
- Pseudocolochirus violaceus

Scientific classification
- Kingdom: Animalia
- Phylum: Echinodermata
- Class: Holothuroidea
- Subclass: Actinopoda
- Order: Dendrochirotida

Families
- (See Text)

= Dendrochirotida =

Order of sea cucumbers

Dendrochirotida are an order of sea cucumbers. Members of this order have branched tentacles and are suspension feeders. Examples include Thyonella and Cucumaria.

== Characteristics ==
Holothurians in this order are characterised by ten to thirty much branched tentacles which are sometimes digitate. They also have ring structures composed of ten calcareous plates circling the pharynx. They have both retractor and introvert muscles which means they can retract the tentacles into the mouth when not feeding. The body wall is either firm with large ossicles or of a soft consistency with few ossicles. In some genera the animals attach themselves to hard surfaces but in others they burrow into soft sediments. Prey is captured by the sticky tentacles and transferred to the mouth. The larvae are lecithotrophic, not feeding on plankton but surviving only on materials already present in the eggs until they settle and become juveniles.

== Taxonomy ==
Order: Dendrochirotida

- family Cucumariidae Ludwig, 1894
- family Cucumellidae Thandar & Arumugam, 2011
- family Heterothyonidae Pawson, 1970
- family †Monilipsolidae Smith & Gallemí, 1991
- family Paracucumidae Pawson & Fell, 1965
- family Phyllophoridae Östergren, 1907
- family Placothuriidae Pawson & Fell, 1965
- family Psolidae Burmeister, 1837
- family Rhopalodinidae Théel, 1886
- family Sclerodactylidae Panning, 1949
- family Vaneyellidae Pawson & Fell, 1965
- family Ypsilothuriidae Heding, 1942
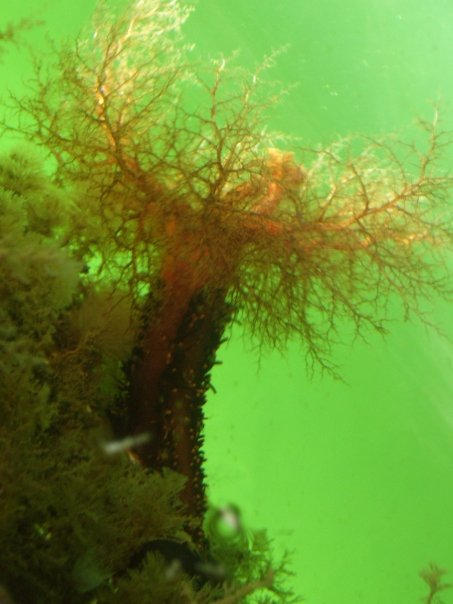
Cucumaria miniata, a Cucumariidae

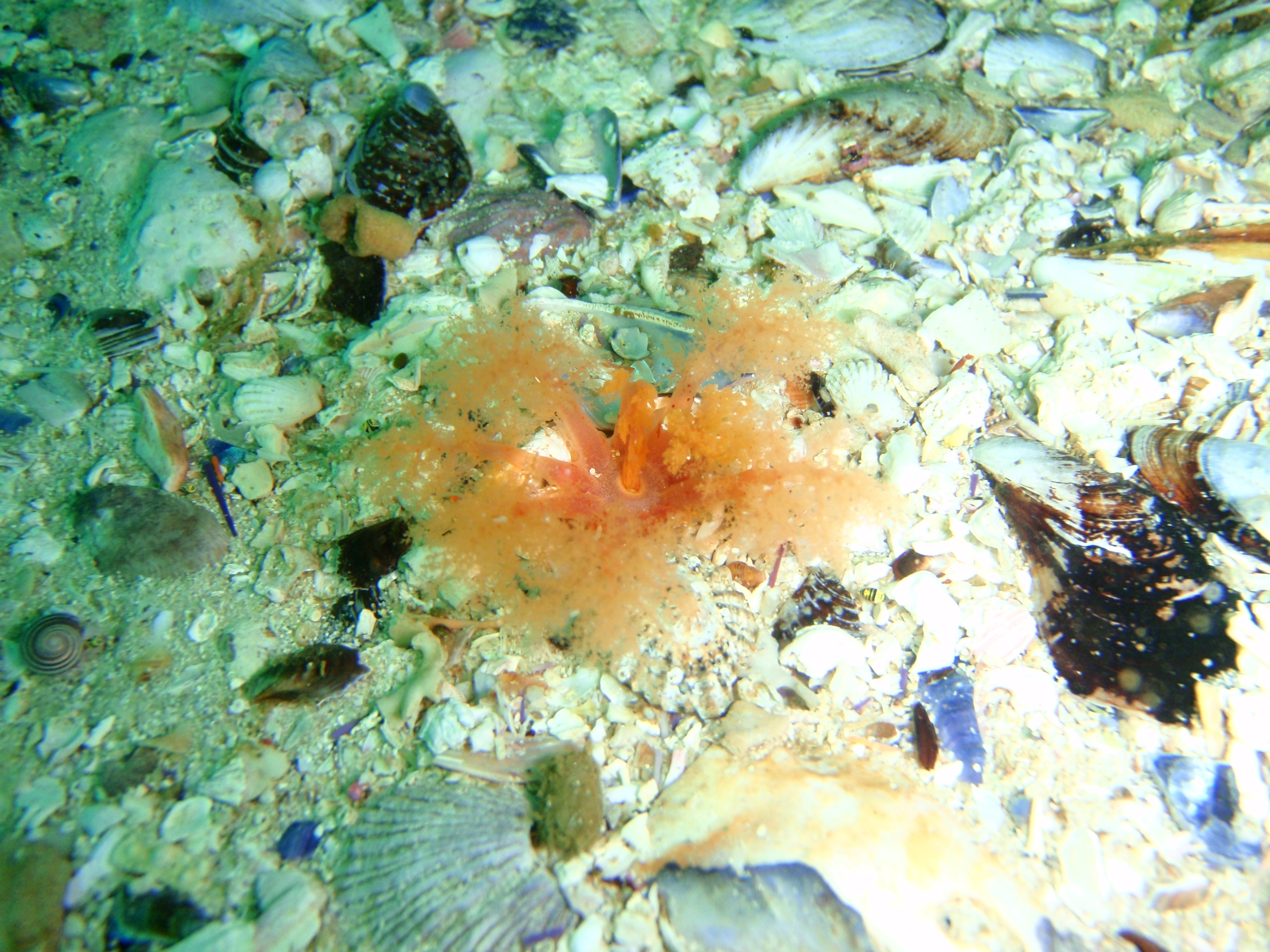
Thyone aurea, a Phyllophoridae

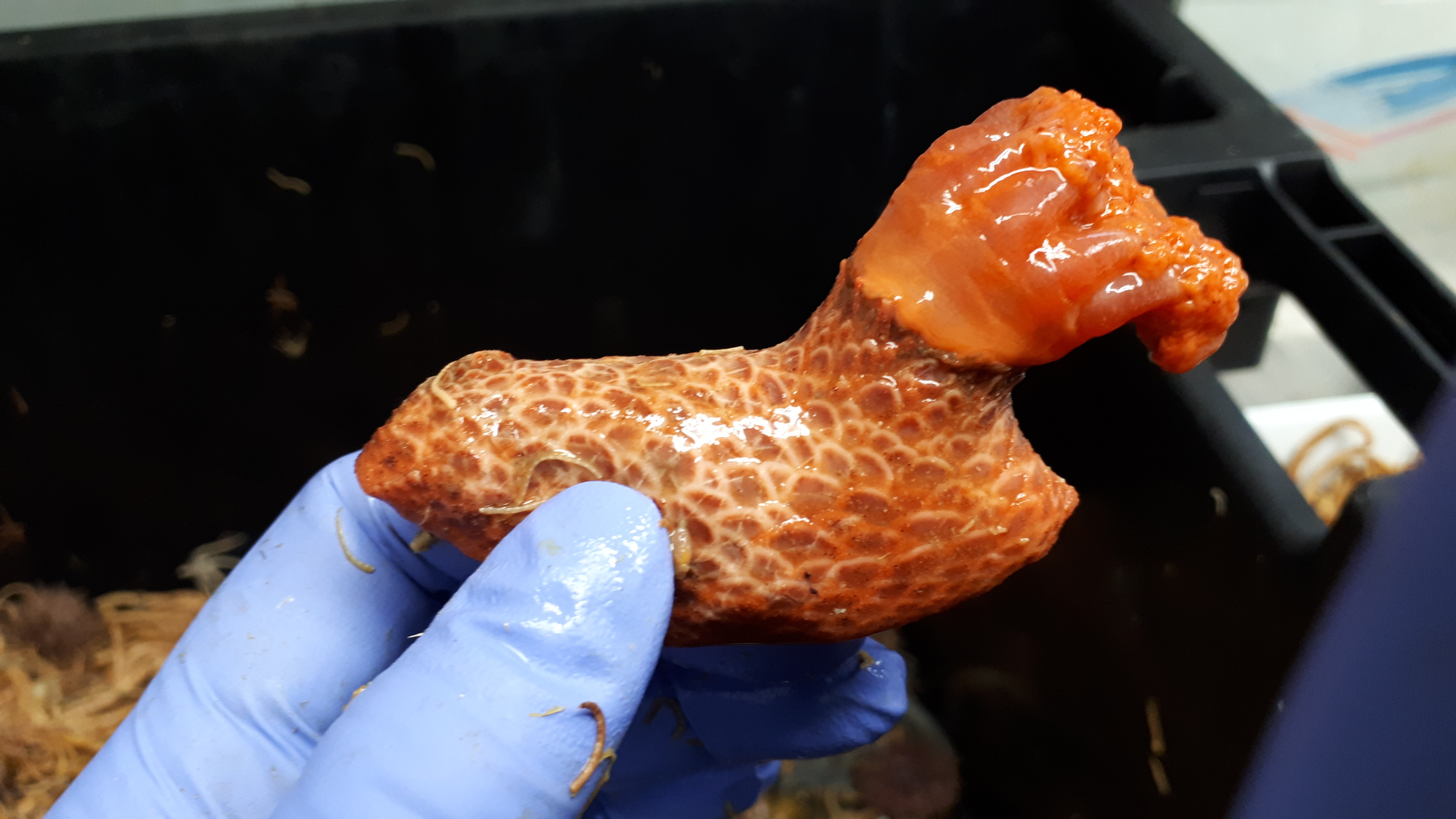
Psolus fabricii, a Psolidae

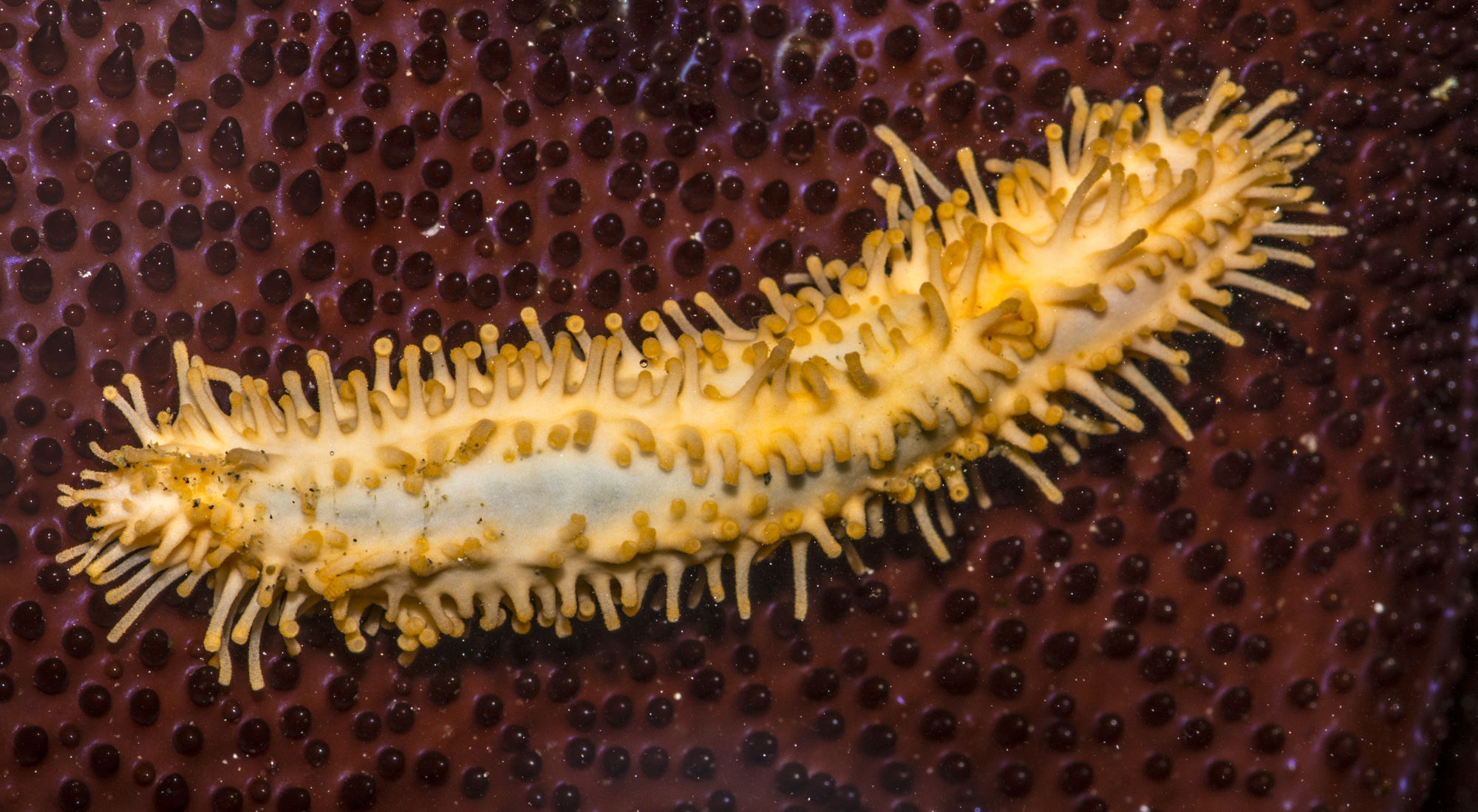
Eupentacta quinquesemita, a Sclerodactylidae

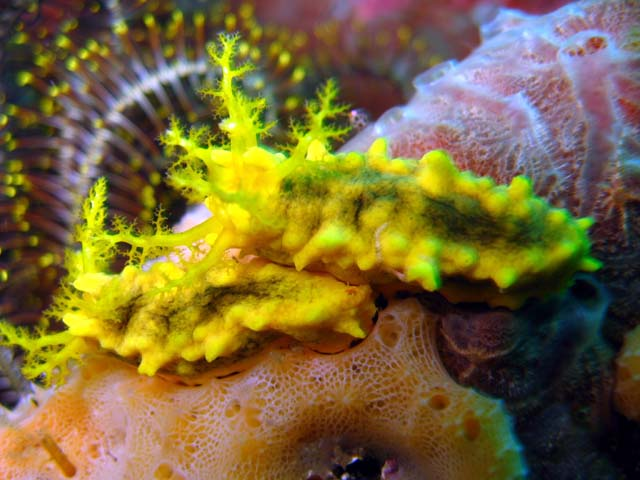
Colochirus robustus

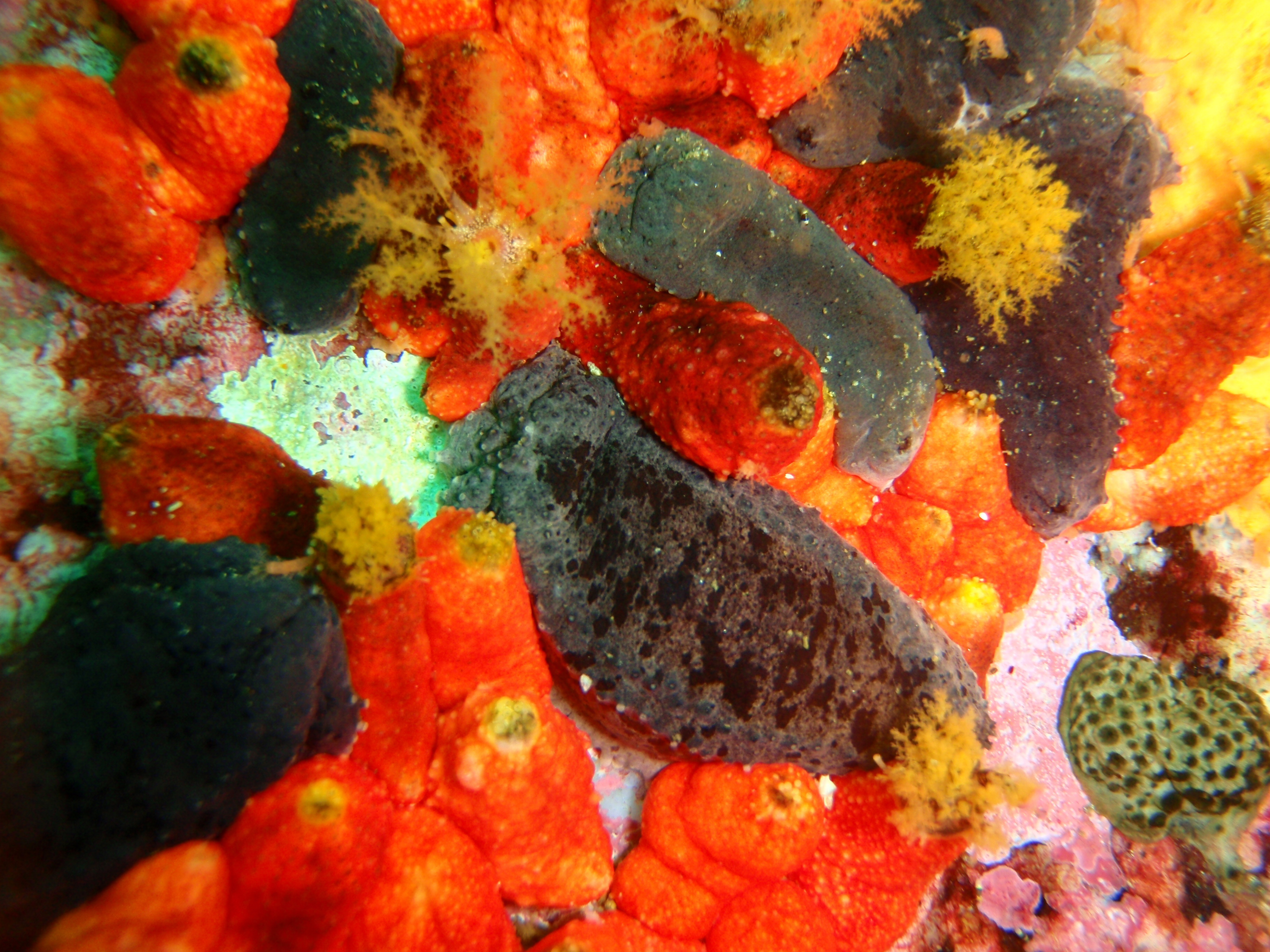
Pseudocnella insolens (red) and Pentacta doliolum (dark)

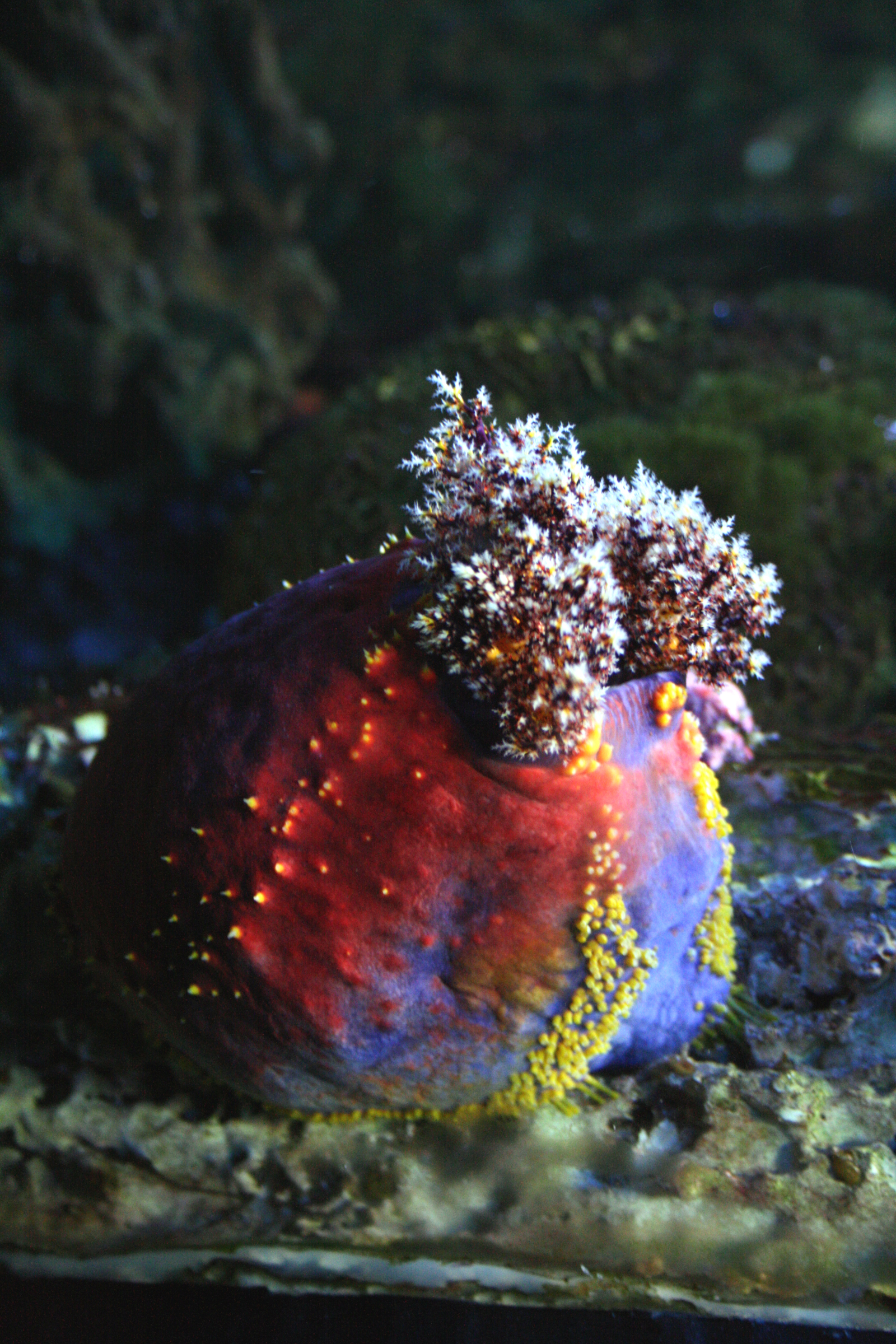
Pseudocolochirus violaceus

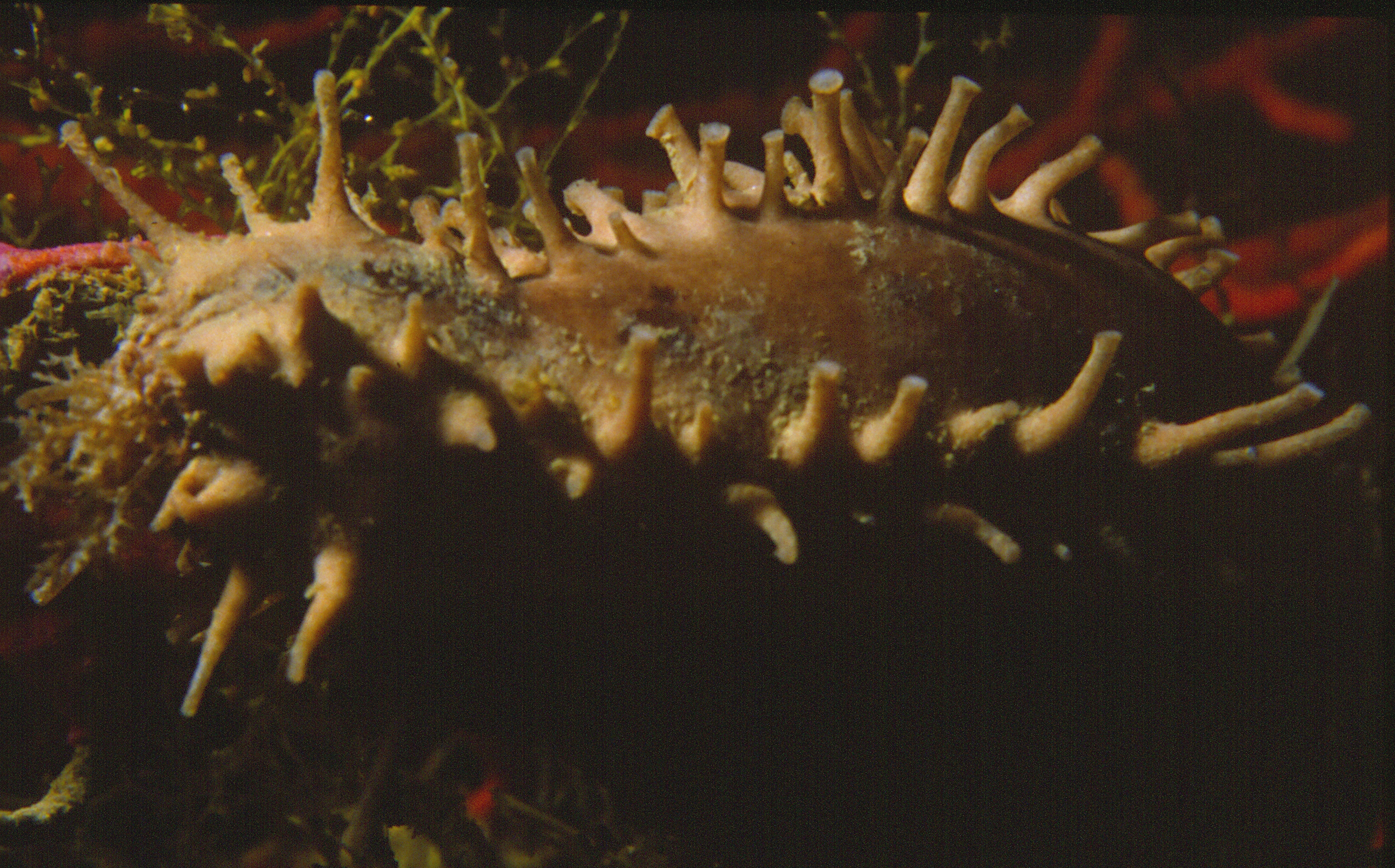
Cucumaria planci
