= A. californicus =

A. californicus may refer to:

An abbreviation of a species name. In binomial nomenclature the name of a species is always the name of the genus to which the species belongs, followed by the species name (also called the species epithet). In A. californicus the genus name has been abbreviated to A. and the species has been spelled out in full. In a document that uses this abbreviation it should always be clear from the context which genus name has been abbreviated.

Some of the most common uses of A. californicus are:

- Amaranthus californicus, the California amaranth, a flowering plant species native to most of the western United States and Canada
- Andricus californicus, an alternative scientific name for Andricus quercuscalifornicus, a species of gall wasp
- Apostichopus californicus, a sea cucumber found from the Gulf of Alaska to Southern California
- Astragalus californicus, the Klamath Basin milkvetch, a plant species native to northern California and southern Oregon

== See also ==
- List of Latin and Greek words commonly used in systematic names#C
