= Thyonicola americana =

Scientific classification
- Kingdom: Animalia
- Phylum: Mollusca
- Class: Gastropoda
- Subclass: Caenogastropoda
- Order: Littorinimorpha
- Family: Eulimidae
- Genus: Thyonicola
- Species: T. americana

Binomial name
- Thyonicola americana Tikasingh, 1961

Species of gastropod

Thyonicola americana is a species of parasitic sea snail, a marine gastropod mollusc in the family Eulimidae. It infests the sea cucumbers Eupentacta quinquesemita and Eupentacta pseudoquinquesemita in Puget Sound and other parts of the northeastern Pacific Ocean.

== Description ==
The adult female Thyonicola americana bears little resemblance to a mollusc, having no shell and a coiled worm-like form. While living in the visceral tissues of its host, its central cavity is connected to the large intestine lumen of its host by a thin stalk, inside which is a tubule lined with cilia. The larvae are recognisable as mollusc larvae and have a shell and foot but no velum. They are benthic and move by crawling.

== Life cycle ==
A female T. americana larva settles on a suitable host and undergoes metamorphosis into a juvenile which makes its way into the host's gut, possibly through the cloaca, and penetrates the gut wall. The adult female is a worm-like organism which when uncurled can be up to 200 mm (8 in) long. The male larva enters the central cavity of the adult female and undergoes metamorphosis into a dwarf adult; it then atrophies apart from its testicular tissues which fertilise the eggs produced by the female. After taking about six months to mature, the parasite can reproduce continually, reaching peak reproduction in late summer. As it matures, the ovaries develop and the interior cavity begins to accumulate egg capsules containing eggs and developing larvae. There may be about 500 capsules each containing 75 to 150 larvae. The larvae are liberated into the host's gut sequentially as they mature. In the autumn, most host sea cucumbers eviscerate, growing a new gut in the spring. Not all individuals eviscerate, but when this occurs, the parasite is expelled (due to its attachment to the gut wall) and dies, and any remaining egg capsules are liberated into the open sea. The parasite seems to be present only in sea cucumbers with entire guts, and more than one parasite may be present in one host.

== Ecology ==
The adult T. americana lives attached to the hind third of the intestine of the sea cucumber Eupentacta quinquesemita, a common holothurian in the Pacific Northwest, and also to the closely related Eupentacta pseudoquinquesemita; in Puget Sound, 38% of the latter were found to be parasitised. E. quinquesemita exhibits a seasonal evisceration, expelling its guts in the autumn and growing a new set in the spring. However evisceration of the host results in the death of the parasite, and when this happens many individuals will not have reached full maturity and will fail to complete their life cycles.
