= Pseudocucumis =

Pseudocucumis may refer to two different genera:

- Pseudocucumis, a synonym for Cladolabes, a genus of sea cucumbers in the family Sclerodactylidae
- Pseudocucumis, a synonym for Citrullus, a genus of plants
