= Genetically modified animal =

Animal that has been genetically modified

Genetically modified animals are animals that have been genetically modified for a variety of purposes including producing drugs, enhancing yields, increasing resistance to disease, etc. The vast majority of genetically modified animals are at the research stage while the number close to entering the market remains small.

== Production ==
The process of genetically engineering mammals is a slow, tedious, and expensive process. As with other genetically modified organisms (GMOs), first genetic engineers must isolate the gene they wish to insert into the host organism. This can be taken from a cell containing the gene or artificially synthesised. If the chosen gene or the donor organism's genome has been well studied it may already be accessible from a genetic library. The gene is then combined with other genetic elements, including a promoter and terminator region and usually a selectable marker.

A number of techniques are available for inserting the isolated gene into the host genome. With animals DNA is generally inserted into using microinjection, where it can be injected through the cell's nuclear envelope directly into the nucleus, or through the use of viral vectors. The first transgenic animals were produced by injecting viral DNA into embryos and then implanting the embryos in females. It is necessary to ensure that the inserted DNA is present in the embryonic stem cells. The embryo would develop and it would be hoped that some of the genetic material would be incorporated into the reproductive cells. Then researchers would have to wait until the animal reached breeding age and then offspring would be screened for presence of the gene in every cell, using PCR, Southern hybridization, and DNA sequencing.

New technologies are making genetic modifications easier and more precise. Gene targeting techniques, which creates double-stranded breaks and takes advantage on the cells natural homologous recombination repair systems, have been developed to target insertion to exact locations. Genome editing uses artificially engineered nucleases that create breaks at specific points. There are four families of engineered nucleases: meganucleases, zinc finger nucleases, transcription activator-like effector nucleases (TALENs), and the Cas9-guideRNA system (adapted from CRISPR). TALEN and CRISPR are the two most commonly used and each has its own advantages. TALENs have greater target specificity, while CRISPR is easier to design and more efficient. The development of the CRISPR-Cas9 gene editing system has effectively halved the amount of time needed to develop genetically modified animals.

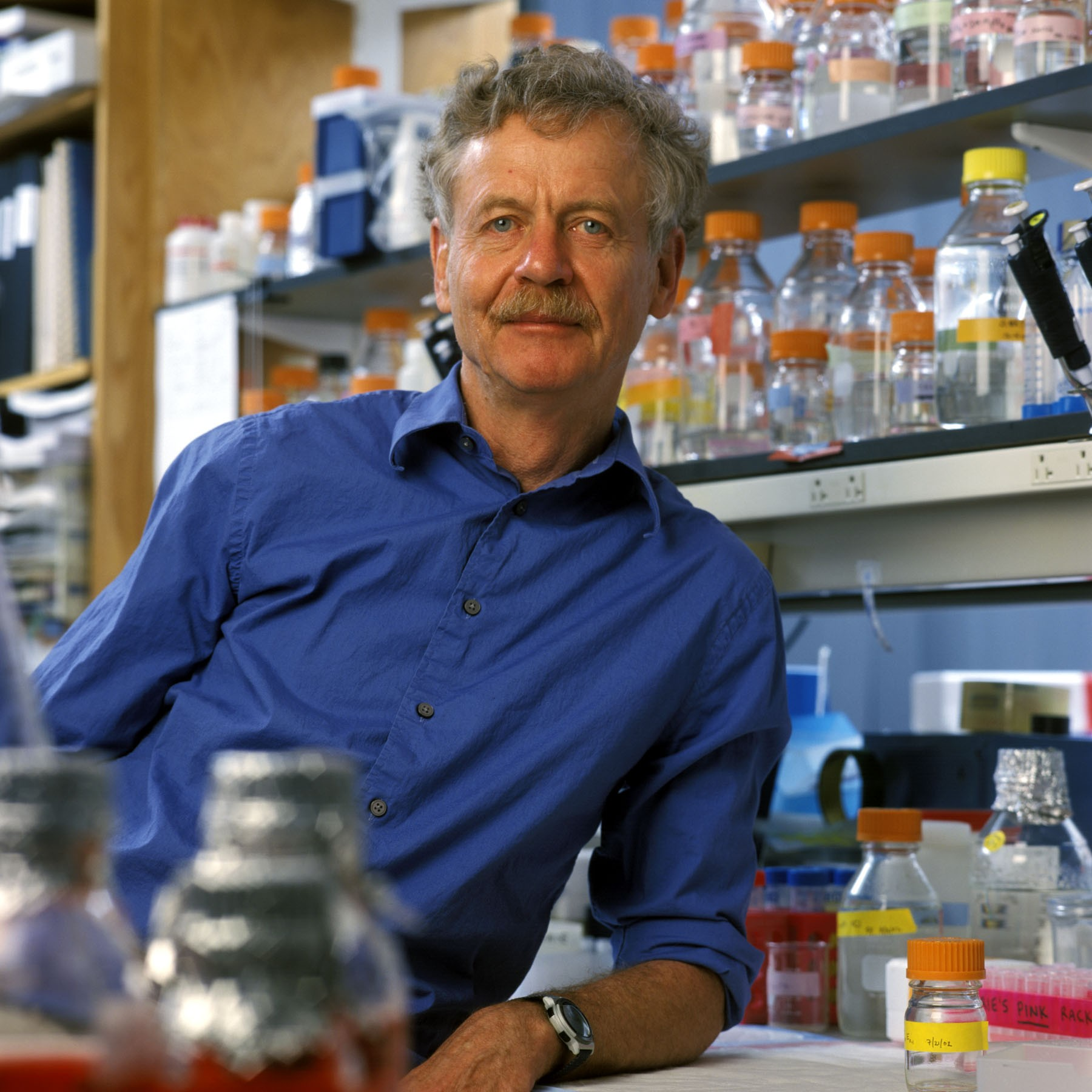
In 1974, Rudolf Jaenisch created the first GM animal.

Humans have domesticated animals since around 12,000 BCE, using selective breeding or artificial selection (as contrasted with natural selection). The process of selective breeding, in which organisms with desired traits (and thus with the desired genes) are used to breed the next generation and organisms lacking the trait are not bred, is a precursor to the modern concept of genetic modification Various advancements in genetics allowed humans to directly alter the DNA and therefore genes of organisms. In 1972, Paul Berg created the first recombinant DNA molecule when he combined DNA from a monkey virus with that of the lambda virus.

In 1974, Rudolf Jaenisch created a transgenic mouse by introducing foreign DNA into its embryo, making it the world's first transgenic animal. However it took another eight years before transgenic mice were developed that passed the transgene to their offspring. Genetically modified mice were created in 1984 that carried cloned oncogenes, predisposing them to developing cancer. Mice with genes knocked out (knockout mouse) were created in 1989. The first transgenic livestock were produced in 1985 and the first animal to synthesise transgenic proteins in their milk were mice, engineered to produce human tissue plasminogen activator in 1987.

The first genetically modified animal to be commercialised was the GloFish, a Zebra fish with a fluorescent gene added that allows it to glow in the dark under ultraviolet light. It was released to the US market in 2003. The first genetically modified animal to be approved for food use was AquAdvantage salmon in 2015. The salmon were transformed with a growth hormone-regulating gene from a Pacific Chinook salmon and a promoter from an ocean pout enabling it to grow year-round instead of only during spring and summer.

== Mammals ==
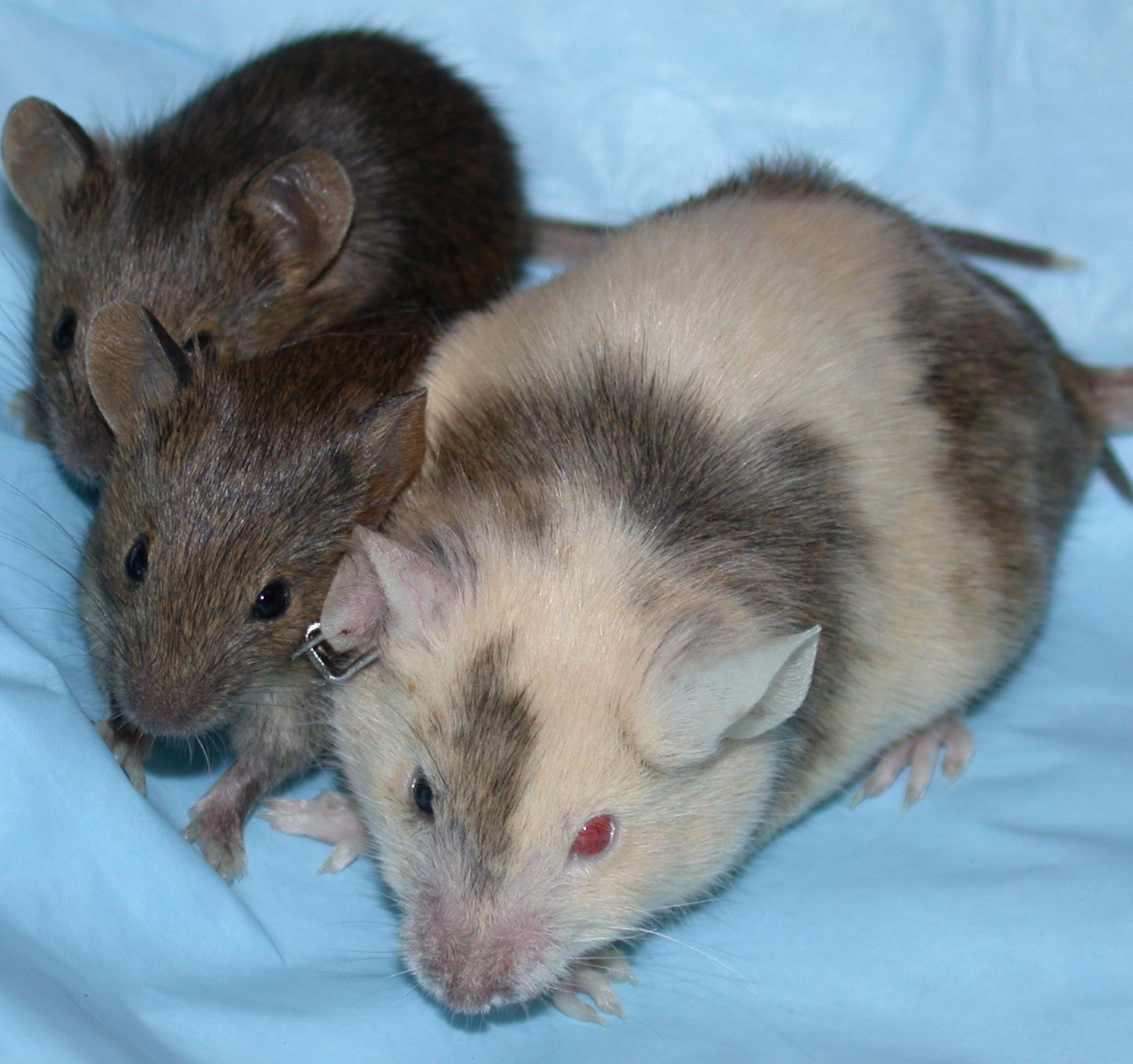
Some chimeras, like the blotched mouse shown, are created through genetic modification techniques like gene targeting.

GM mammals are created for research purposes, production of industrial or therapeutic products, agricultural uses or improving their health. There is also a market for creating genetically modified pets.

=== Medicine ===
Mammals are the best models for human disease, making genetic engineered ones vital to the discovery and development of cures and treatments for many serious diseases. Knocking out genes responsible for human genetic disorders allows researchers to study the mechanism of the disease and to test possible cures. Genetically modified mice have been the most common mammals used in biomedical research, as they are cheap and easy to manipulate. Examples include humanized mice created by xenotransplantation of human gene products, so as to be utilized as murine human-animal hybrids for gaining relevant insights in the in vivo context for understanding of human-specific physiology and pathologies. Pigs are also a good target, because they have a similar body size, anatomical features, physiology, pathophysiological response, and diet. Nonhuman primates are the most similar model organisms to humans, but there is less public acceptance toward using them as research animals. In 2009, scientists announced that they had successfully transferred a gene into a primate species (marmosets) and produced a stable line of breeding transgenic primates for the first time. Their first research target for these marmosets was Parkinson's disease, but they were also considering amyotrophic lateral sclerosis and Huntington's disease.

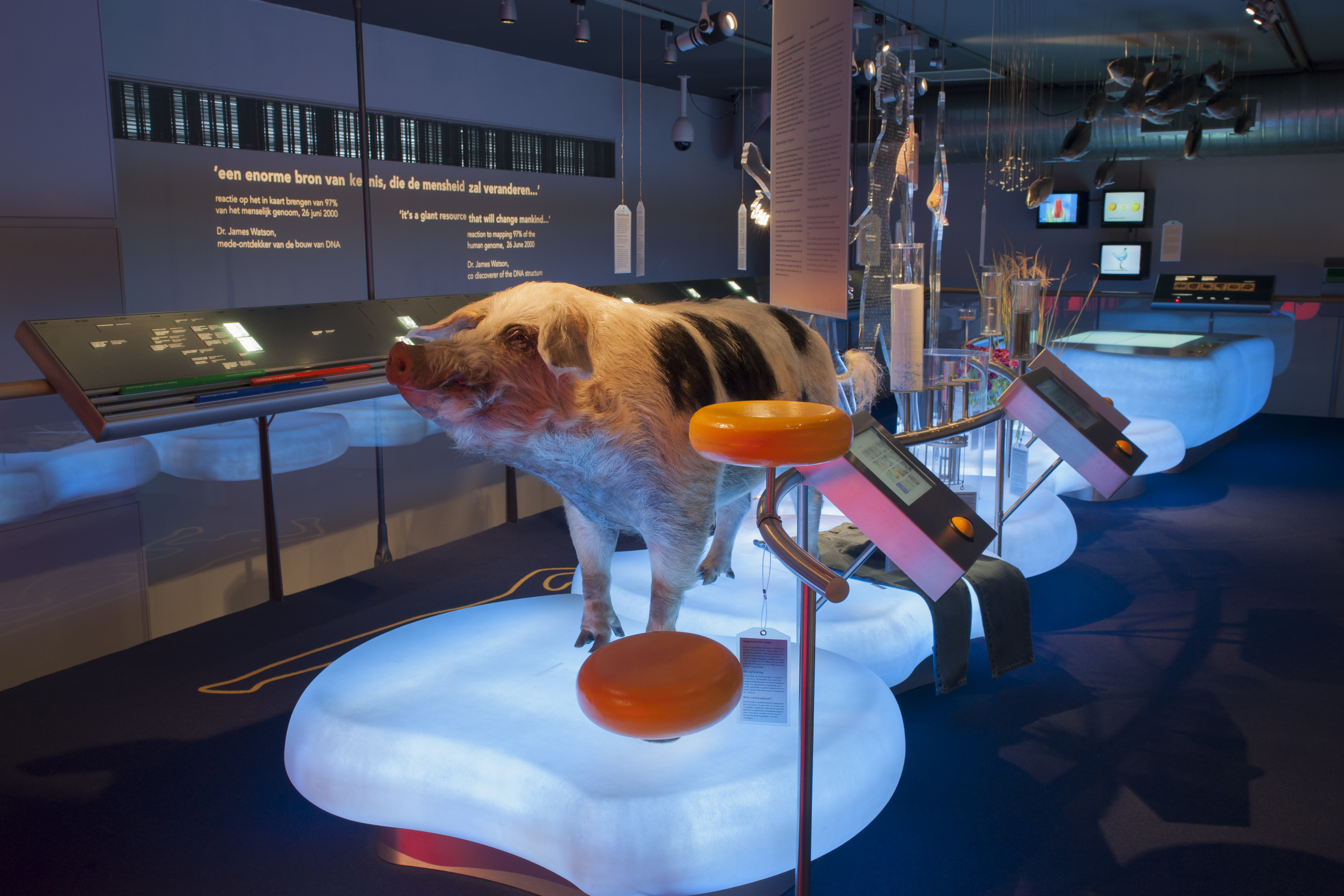
Transgenic pig for cheese production

Human proteins expressed in mammals are more likely to be similar to their natural counterparts than those expressed in plants or microorganisms. Stable expression has been accomplished in sheep, pigs, rats, and other animals. In 2009, the first human biological drug produced from such an animal, a goat, was approved. The drug, ATryn, is an anticoagulant which reduces the probability of blood clots during surgery or childbirth was extracted from the goat's milk. Human alpha-1-antitrypsin is another protein that is used in treating humans with this deficiency. Another area is in creating pigs with greater capacity for human organ transplants (xenotransplantation). Pigs have been genetically modified so that their organs can no longer carry retroviruses or have modifications to reduce the chance of rejection. Pig lungs from genetically modified pigs are being considered for transplantation into humans. There is even potential to create chimeric pigs that can carry human organs.

=== Livestock ===
Livestock are modified with the intention of improving economically important traits such as growth-rate, quality of meat, milk composition, disease resistance and survival. Animals have been engineered to grow faster, be healthier and resist diseases. Modifications have also improved the wool production of sheep and udder health of cows.

Goats have been genetically engineered to produce milk with strong spiderweb-like silk proteins. The goat gene sequence has been modified, using fresh umbilical cords taken from kids, in order to code for the human enzyme lysozyme. Researchers wanted to alter the milk produced by the goats, to contain lysozyme in order to fight off bacteria causing diarrhea in humans.

Enviropig was a genetically enhanced line of Yorkshire pigs in Canada created with the capability of digesting plant phosphorus more efficiently than conventional Yorkshire pigs. The A transgene construct consisting of a promoter expressed in the murine parotid gland and the Escherichia coli phytase gene was introduced into the pig embryo by pronuclear microinjection. This caused the pigs to produce the enzyme phytase, which breaks down the indigestible phosphorus, in their saliva. As a result, they excrete 30 to 70% less phosphorus in manure depending upon the age and diet. The lower concentrations of phosphorus in surface runoff reduces algal growth, because phosphorus is the limiting nutrient for algae. Because algae consume large amounts of oxygen, excessive growth can result in dead zones for fish. Funding for the Enviropig program ended in April 2012, and as no new partners were found the pigs were killed. However, the genetic material will be stored at the Canadian Agricultural Genetics Repository Program. In 2006, a pig was engineered to produce omega-3 fatty acids through the expression of a roundworm gene.

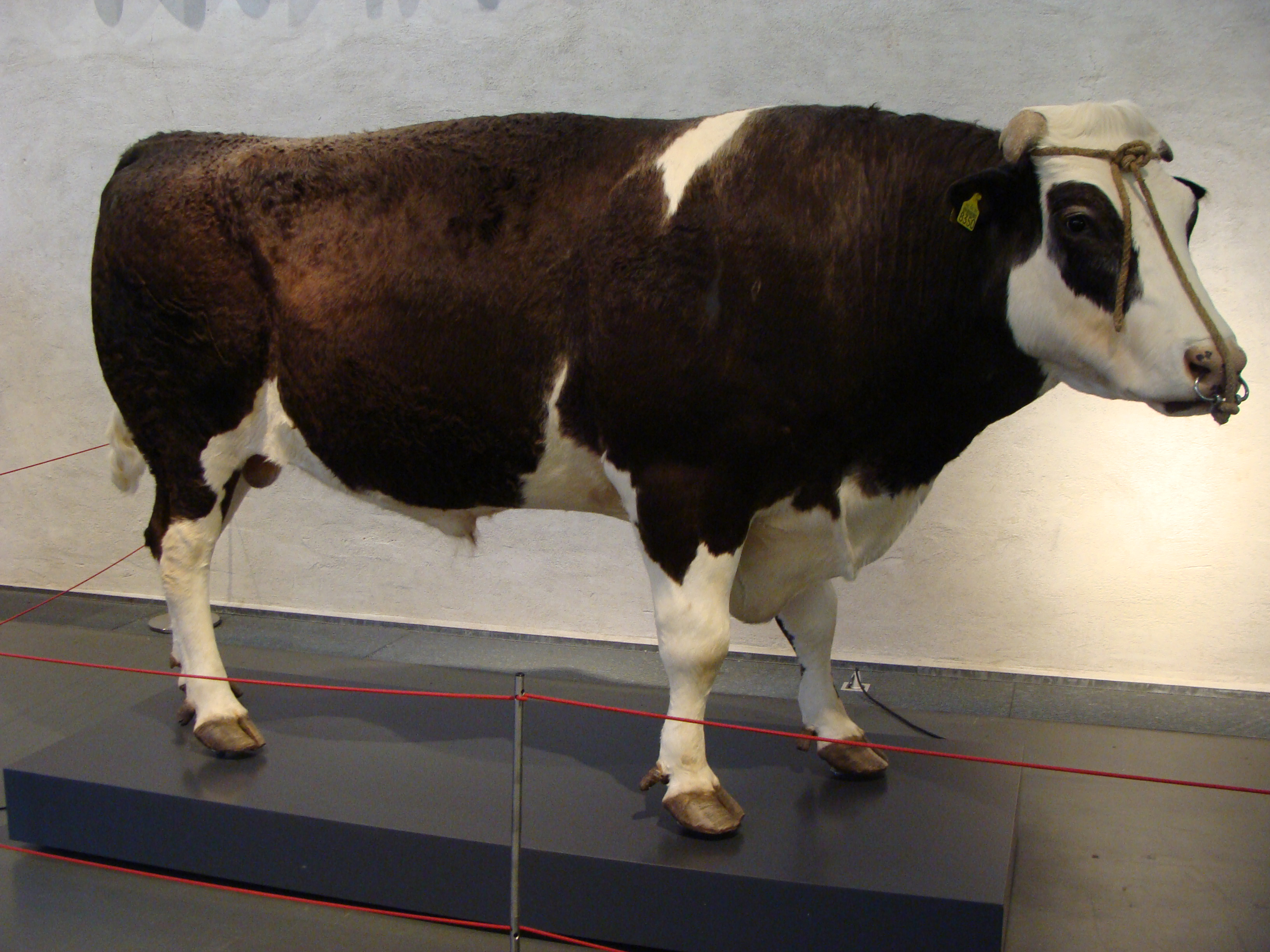
Herman the Bull on display in Naturalis Biodiversity Center

In 1990, the world's first transgenic bovine, Herman the Bull, was developed. Herman was genetically engineered by micro-injected embryonic cells with the human gene coding for lactoferrin. The Dutch Parliament changed the law in 1992 to allow Herman to reproduce. Eight calves were born in 1994 and all calves inherited the lactoferrin gene. With subsequent sirings, Herman fathered a total of 83 calves. Dutch law required Herman to be slaughtered at the conclusion of the experiment. However the Dutch Agriculture Minister at the time, Jozias van Aartsen, granted him a reprieve provided he did not have more offspring after public and scientists rallied to his defence. Together with cloned cows named Holly and Belle, he lived out his retirement at Naturalis, the National Museum of Natural History in Leiden. On 2 April 2004, Herman was euthanised by veterinarians from the University of Utrecht because he suffered from osteoarthritis. At the time of his death Herman was one of the oldest bulls in the Netherlands. Herman's hide has been preserved and mounted by taxidermists and is permanently on display in Naturalis. They say that he represents the start of a new era in the way man deals with nature, an icon of scientific progress, and the subsequent public discussion of these issues.

Researchers have developed GM dairy cattle to grow without horns (sometimes referred to as "polled") which can cause injuries to farmers and other animals. DNA was taken from the genome of Red Angus cattle, which is known to suppress horn growth, and inserted into cells taken from an elite Holstein bull called "Randy". Each of the progeny will be a clone of Randy, but without his horns, and their offspring should also be hornless. In 2011, Chinese scientists generated dairy cows genetically engineered with genes from human beings to produce milk that would be the same as human breast milk. This could potentially benefit mothers who cannot produce breast milk but want their children to have breast milk rather than formula. The researchers claim these transgenic cows to be identical to regular cows. Two months later, scientists from Argentina presented Rosita, a transgenic cow incorporating two human genes, to produce milk with similar properties as human breast milk. In 2012, researchers from New Zealand also developed a genetically engineered cow that produced allergy-free milk.

In 2016 Jayne Raper and a team announced the first trypanotolerant transgenic cow in the world. This team, spanning the International Livestock Research Institute, Scotland's Rural College, the Roslin Institute's Centre for Tropical Livestock Genetics and Health, and the City University of New York, announced that a Kenyan Boran bull had been born and had already successfully had two children. Tumaini - named for the Swahili word for "hope" - carries a trypanolytic factor from a baboon via CRISPR/Cas9.

In October 2017, Chinese scientists announced they used CRISPR gene editing technology to create of a line of pigs with better body temperature regulation, resulting in about 24% less body fat than typical livestock.

=== Research ===
Scientists have genetically engineered several organisms, including some mammals, to include green fluorescent protein (GFP), for research purposes. GFP and other similar reporting genes allow easy visualisation and localisation of the products of the genetic modification. Fluorescent pigs have been bred to study human organ transplants, regenerating ocular photoreceptor cells, and other topics. In 2011 green-fluorescent cats were created to find therapies for HIV/AIDS and other diseases as feline immunodeficiency virus (FIV) is related to HIV. Researchers from the University of Wyoming have developed a way to incorporate spiders' silk-spinning genes into goats, allowing the researchers to harvest the silk protein from the goats' milk for a variety of applications.

=== Conservation ===
Genetic modification of the myxoma virus has been proposed to conserve European wild rabbits in the Iberian peninsula and to help regulate them in Australia. To protect the Iberian species from viral diseases, the myxoma virus was genetically modified to immunize the rabbits, while in Australia the same myxoma virus was genetically modified to lower fertility in the Australian rabbit population. There have also been suggestions that genetic engineering could be used to bring animals back from extinction. It involves changing the genome of a close living relative to resemble the extinct one and is currently being attempted with the passenger pigeon. Genes associated with the woolly mammoth have been added to the genome of an African Elephant, although the lead researcher says he has no intention of using live elephants.

=== Humans ===
Gene therapy uses genetically modified viruses to deliver genes which can cure disease in humans. Although gene therapy is still relatively new, it has had some successes. It has been used to treat genetic disorders such as severe combined immunodeficiency and Leber's congenital amaurosis. Treatments are also being developed for a range of other currently incurable diseases, such as cystic fibrosis, sickle cell anemia, Parkinson's disease, cancer, diabetes, heart disease, and muscular dystrophy. These treatments only affect somatic cells, which means that any changes would not be inheritable. Germline gene therapy results in any change being inheritable, which has raised concerns within the scientific community. In 2015, CRISPR was used to edit the DNA of non-viable human embryos. In November 2018, He Jiankui announced that he had edited the genomes of two human embryos, to attempt to disable the CCR5 gene, which codes for a receptor that HIV uses to enter cells. He said that twin girls- Lulu and Nana, had been born a few weeks earlier, and that they carried functional copies of CCR5 along with disabled CCR5 (mosaicism), and were still vulnerable to HIV. The work was widely condemned as unethical, dangerous, and premature.

== Fish ==
Genetically modified fish are used for scientific research, as pets, and as a food source. Aquaculture is a growing industry, currently providing over half of the consumed fish worldwide. Through genetic engineering, it is possible to increase growth rates, reduce food intake, remove allergenic properties, increase cold tolerance, and provide disease resistance.

=== Detecting pollution ===
Fish can also be used to detect aquatic pollution or function as bioreactors. Several groups have been developing zebrafish to detect pollution by attaching fluorescent proteins to genes activated by the presence of pollutants. The fish will then glow and can be used as environmental sensors.

=== Pets ===
The GloFish is a brand of genetically modified fluorescent zebrafish with bright red, green, and orange fluorescent color. It was originally developed by one of the groups to detect pollution, but is now part of the ornamental fish trade, becoming the first genetically modified animal to become publicly available as a pet when it was introduced for sale in 2003.

=== Research ===
GM fish are widely used in basic research in genetics and development. Two species of fish- zebrafish and medaka, are most commonly modified, because they have optically clear chorions (membranes in the egg), rapidly develop, and the 1-cell embryo is easy to see and microinject with transgenic DNA. Zebrafish are model organisms for developmental processes, regeneration, genetics, behaviour, disease mechanisms, and toxicity testing. Their transparency allows researchers to observe developmental stages, intestinal functions, and tumour growth. The generation of transgenic protocols (whole organism, cell or tissue specific, tagged with reporter genes) has increased the level of information gained by studying these fish.

=== Growth ===
GM fish have been developed with promoters driving an over-production of "all fish" growth hormone for use in the aquaculture industry, to increase the speed of development and potentially reduce fishing pressure on wild stocks. This has resulted in dramatic growth enhancement in several species, including salmon, trout, and tilapia.

AquaBounty Technologies have produced a salmon that can mature in half the time as wild salmon. The fish is an Atlantic salmon with a Chinook salmon (Oncorhynchus tshawytscha) gene inserted. This allows the fish to produce growth hormones all year round compared to the wild-type fish that produces the hormone for only part of the year. The fish also has a second gene inserted from the eel-like ocean pout that acts like an "on" switch for the hormone. Pout also have antifreeze proteins in their blood, which allow the GM salmon to survive near-freezing waters and continue their development. A wild-type salmon takes 24 to 30 months to reach market size (4–6 kg), whereas the producers of the GM salmon say that it requires only 18 months for the GM fish to reach that size. In November 2015, the FDA of the USA approved the AquAdvantage salmon for commercial production, sale, and consumption, the first non-plant GMO food to be commercialized.

AquaBounty says that to prevent the genetically modified fish from inadvertently breeding with wild salmon, all of the fish will be female and reproductively sterile, although a small percentage of the females may remain fertile. Some opponents of the GM salmon have dubbed it the "Frankenfish".

== Insects ==
=== Research ===
In biological research, transgenic fruit flies (Drosophila melanogaster) are model organisms used to study the effects of genetic changes on development. Fruit flies are often preferred over other animals due to their short life cycle and low maintenance requirements. It also has a relatively simple genome compared to many vertebrates, with typically only one copy of each gene, making phenotypic analysis easy. Drosophila have been used to study genetics and inheritance, embryonic development, learning, behavior, and aging. Transposons (particularly P elements) are well developed in Drosophila and provided an early method to add transgenes to their genome, although this has been taken over by more modern gene-editing techniques.

=== Population control ===
Due to their significance to human health, scientists are looking at ways to control mosquitoes through genetic engineering. Malaria-resistant mosquitoes have been developed in the laboratory. by inserting a gene that reduces the development of the malaria parasite and then use homing endonucleases to rapidly spread that gene throughout the male population (known as a gene drive). This has been taken further by swapping it for a lethal gene. In trials the populations of Aedes aegypti mosquitoes, the single most important carrier of dengue fever and Zika virus, were reduced by between 80% and by 90%. Another approach is to use the sterile insect technique, whereby males genetically engineered to be sterile out compete viable males, to reduce population numbers.

Other insect pests that make attractive targets are moths. Diamondback moths cause US$4 to $5 billion of damage a year worldwide. The approach is similar to the mosquitoes, where males transformed with a gene that prevents females from reaching maturity will be released. They underwent field trials in 2017. Genetically modified moths have previously been released in field trials. A strain of pink bollworm that were sterilised with radiation were genetically engineered to express a red fluorescent protein making it easier for researchers to monitor them.

=== Industry ===
Silkworm, the larvae stage of Bombyx mori, is an economically important insect in sericulture. Scientists are developing strategies to enhance silk quality and quantity. There is also potential to use the silk producing machinery to make other valuable proteins. Proteins expressed by silkworms include; human serum albumin, human collagen α-chain, mouse monoclonal antibody and N-glycanase. Silkworms have been created that produce spider silk, a stronger but extremely difficult to harvest silk, and even novel silks.

== Birds ==
Attempts to produce genetically modified birds began before 1980. Chickens have been genetically modified for a variety of purposes. This includes studying embryo development, preventing the transmission of bird flu and providing evolutionary insights using reverse engineering to recreate dinosaur-like phenotypes. A GM chicken that produces the drug Kanuma, an enzyme that treats a rare condition, in its egg passed regulatory approval in 2015.

=== Disease control ===
One potential use of GM birds could be to reduce the spread of avian disease. Researchers at Roslin Institute have produced a strain of GM chickens (Gallus gallus domesticus) that does not transmit avian flu to other birds; however, these birds are still susceptible to contracting it. The genetic modification is an RNA molecule that prevents the virus reproduction by mimicking the region of the flu virus genome that controls replication. It is referred to as a "decoy" because it diverts the flu virus enzyme, the polymerase, from functions that are required for virus replication.

=== Evolutionary insights ===
A team of geneticists led by University of Montana paleontologist Jack Horner is seeking to modify a chicken to express several features present in ancestral maniraptorans but absent in modern birds, such as teeth and a long tail, creating what has been dubbed a 'chickenosaurus'. Parallel projects have produced chicken embryos expressing dinosaur-like skull, leg, and foot anatomy. In 2023, Horner claimed success in creating longer chicken tails, and expressed caution regarding future developments.

=== In-ovo sexing ===
Gene editing is one possible tool in the laying hen breeding industry to provide an alternative to Chick culling. With this technology, breeding hens are given a genetic marker that is only passed down to male offspring. These males can then be identified during incubation and removed from the egg supply, so that only females hatch. For example, the Israeli startup eggXYt uses CRISPR to give male eggs a biomarker that makes then glow under certain conditions. Importantly, the resulting laying hen and the eggs it producers are not themselves genetically edited. The European Union's Director General for Health and Food Safety has confirmed that made in this way eggs can be marketed, although none are commercially available as of June 2023.

== Amphibians ==
The first experiments that successfully developed transgenic amphibians into embryos began in the 1980s with Xenopus laevis. Later, germline transgenic axolotls in Ambystoma mexicanum were produced in 2006 using a technique called I-SceI-mediated transgenesis which utilizes the I-SceI endonuclease enzyme that can break DNA at specific sites and allow for foreign DNA to be inserted into the genome. Both Xenopus laevis and Ambystoma mexicanum are model organisms used to study regeneration. In addition, transgenic lines have been produced in other salamanders including the Japanese newt Pyrrhogaster and Pleurodeles watl. Genetically modified frogs, in particular Xenopus laevis and Xenopus tropicalis, are used in development biology. GM frogs can also be used as pollution sensors, especially for endocrine disrupting chemicals. There are proposals to use genetic engineering to control cane toads in Australia. Many lines of transgenic X. laevis are used to study immunology to address how bacteria and viruses cause infectious disease at the University of Rochester Medical Center's X. laevis Research Resource for Immunobiology (XLRRI). Amphibians can also be used to study and validate regenerative signaling pathways such as the Wnt pathway. The wound-healing abilities of amphibians have many practical applications and can potentially provide a foundation for scar-free repair in human plastic surgery, such as treating the skin of burn patients.

Amphibians like X. laevis are suitable for experimental embryology because they have large embryos that can be easily manipulated and observed during development. In experiments with axolotls, mutants with white pigmented skin are often used because their semi-transparent skin provides an efficient visualization and tracking method for fluorescently tagged proteins like GFP. Amphibians are not always ideal when it comes to the resources required to produce genetically modified animals; along with the one to two-year generation time, Xenopus laevis can be considered less than ideal for transgenic experiments because of its pseudotetraploid genome. Due to the same genes appearing in the genome multiple times, the chance of mutagenesis experiments working is lower. Current methods of freezing and thawing axolotl sperm render them nonfunctional, meaning transgenic lines must be maintained in a facility and this can get quite costly. Producing transgenic axolotls has many challenges due to their large genome size. Current methods of generating transgenic axolotls are limited to random integration of the transgene cassette into the genome, which can lead to uneven expression or silencing. Gene duplicates also complicate efforts to generate efficient gene knockouts.

Despite the costs, axolotls have unique regenerative abilities and ultimately provide useful information in understanding tissue regeneration because they can regenerate their limbs, spinal cord, skin, heart, lungs, and other organs. Naturally occurring mutant axolotls like the white strain that are often used in research have a transcriptional mutation at the Edn3 gene locus. Unlike other model organisms, the first fluorescently labeled cells in axolotls were differentiated muscle cells instead of embryos. In these initial experiments in the early 2000s, scientists were able to visualize muscle cell regeneration in the axolotl tail using a microinjecting technique, but cells could not be traced for the entire course of regeneration due to too harsh conditions that caused early cell death in labeled cells. Though the process of producing transgenic axolotls was a challenge, scientists were able to label cells for longer durations using a plasmid transfection technique, which involves injecting DNA into cells using an electrical pulse in a process called electroporation. Transfecting axolotl cells is thought to be more difficult because of the composition of the extracellular matrix (ECM). This technique allows spinal cord cells to be labeled and is very important in studying limb regeneration in many other cells; it has been used to study the role of the immune system in regeneration. Using gene knockout approaches, scientists can target specific regions of DNA using techniques like CRISPR/Cas9 to understand the function of certain genes based on the absence of the gene of interest. For example, gene knockouts of the Sox2 gene confirm this region's role in neural stem cell amplification in the axolotl. The technology to do more complex conditional gene knockouts, or conditional knockouts that give the scientist spatiotemporal control of the gene is not yet suitable for axolotls. However, research in this field continues to develop and is made easier by recent sequencing of the genome and resources created for scientists, including data portals that contain axolotl genome and transcriptome reference assemblies to identify orthologs.

== Nematodes ==
The nematode Caenorhabditis elegans is one of the major model organisms for researching molecular biology. RNA interference (RNAi) was discovered in C. elegans and could be induced by simply feeding them bacteria modified to express double stranded RNA. It is also relatively easy to produce stable transgenic nematodes and this along with RNAi are the major tools used in studying their genes. The most common use of transgenic nematodes has been studying gene expression and localisation by attaching reporter genes. Transgenes can also be combined with RNAi to rescue phenotypes, altered to study gene function, imaged in real time as the cells develop or used to control expression for different tissues or developmental stages. Transgenic nematodes have been used to study viruses, toxicology, and diseases and to detect environmental pollutants.

== Other ==
Systems have been developed to create transgenic organisms in a wide variety of other animals. The gene responsible for albinism in sea cucumbers has been found, and used to engineer white sea cucumbers, a rare delicacy. The technology also opens the way to investigate the genes responsible for some of the cucumbers more unusual traits, including hibernating in summer, eviscerating their intestines, and dissolving their bodies upon death. Flatworms have the ability to regenerate themselves from a single cell. Until 2017 there was no effective way to transform them, which hampered research. By using microinjection and radiation, scientists have now created the first genetically modified flatworms. The bristle worm, a marine annelid, has been modified. It is of interest due to its reproductive cycle being synchronized with lunar phases, regeneration capacity and slow evolution rate. Cnidaria such as Hydra and the sea anemone Nematostella vectensis are attractive model organisms to study the evolution of immunity and certain developmental processes. Other organisms that have been genetically modified include snails, geckos, turtles, crayfish, oysters, shrimp, clams, abalone, and sponges.

Food products derived from genetically modified (GM) animals have not yet entered the European market. Nonetheless, the on-going discussion about GM crops [1], and the developing debate about the safety and ethics of foods and pharmaceutical products produced by both GM animals and plants, have provoked varying views across different sectors of society

Animal welfare and ethics resources

== Ethics ==
Genetic modification and genome editing hold potential for the future, but decisions regarding the use of these technologies must be based not only on what is possible, but also on what is ethically reasonable. Principles such as animal integrity, naturalness, risk identification and animal welfare are examples of ethically important factors that must be taken into consideration, and they also influence public perception and regulatory decisions by authorities.

The utility of extrapolating animal data to humans has been questioned. This has led ethical committees to adopt the principles of the four Rs (Reduction, Refinement, Replacement, and Responsibility) as a guide for decision-making regarding animal experimentation. However, complete abandonment of laboratory animals has not yet been possible, and further research is needed to develop a roadmap for robust alternatives before their use can be fully discontinued.
