= Genetically modified agriculture =

Genetically modified agriculture includes:

- Genetically modified crops
- Genetically modified livestock
