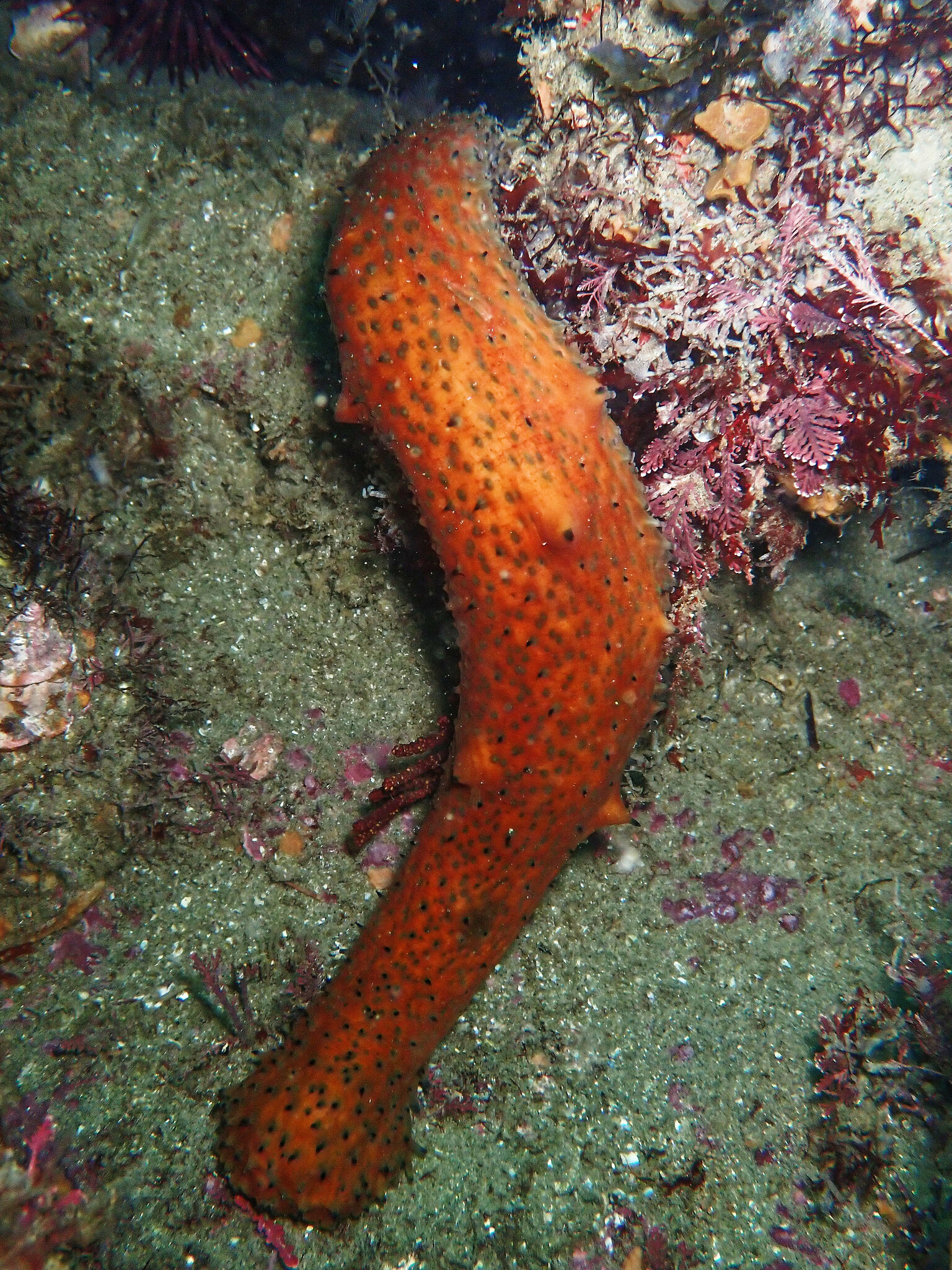

Conservation status
- Vulnerable (IUCN 3.1)

Scientific classification
- Domain: Eukaryota
- Kingdom: Animalia
- Phylum: Echinodermata
- Class: Holothuroidea
- Order: Synallactida
- Family: Stichopodidae
- Genus: Apostichopus
- Species: A. parvimensis

Binomial name
- Apostichopus parvimensis (H.L. Clark, 1913)

Synonyms
- Stichopus parvimensis H.L. Clark 1913

= Apostichopus parvimensis =

Warty sea cucumber

Apostichopus parvimensis, commonly known as the warty sea cucumber, is a Pacific species of sea cucumber that can be found from the Baja California Peninsula, Mexico, to Monterey Bay, California, USA, although only scattered individuals were reported to occur north of Point Conception, California. It is found mainly in low energy environments from the intertidal zone down to 30 m (98 ft), but can occur as deep as 60 m (200 ft).

== Physical description ==
The warty sea cucumber can reach a maximum length of 30–40 cm (1 ft 0 in – 1 ft 4 in). It has a soft, cylindrical body, with red-brown to yellowish leathery skin. There are numerous grey spots along its body, hence the name "warty." It has an endoskeleton just below the skin. The mouth and anus are on opposite sides of the body. The mouth is surrounded by ten retractable tentacles that are used to bring food in. Five rows of tube feet extend from the mouth to the anus.

== Behavior and reproduction ==
Apostichopus parvimensis is a solitary nocturnal animal. When threatened, it can expel its internal organs through its anus and grow new ones.

These sea cucumbers have separate sexes, and eggs are fertilized externally. Spawning usually takes place in November, and each female can produce thousands of eggs. After fertilization, a larva is formed which metamorphoses into a sea cucumber after a few weeks.
