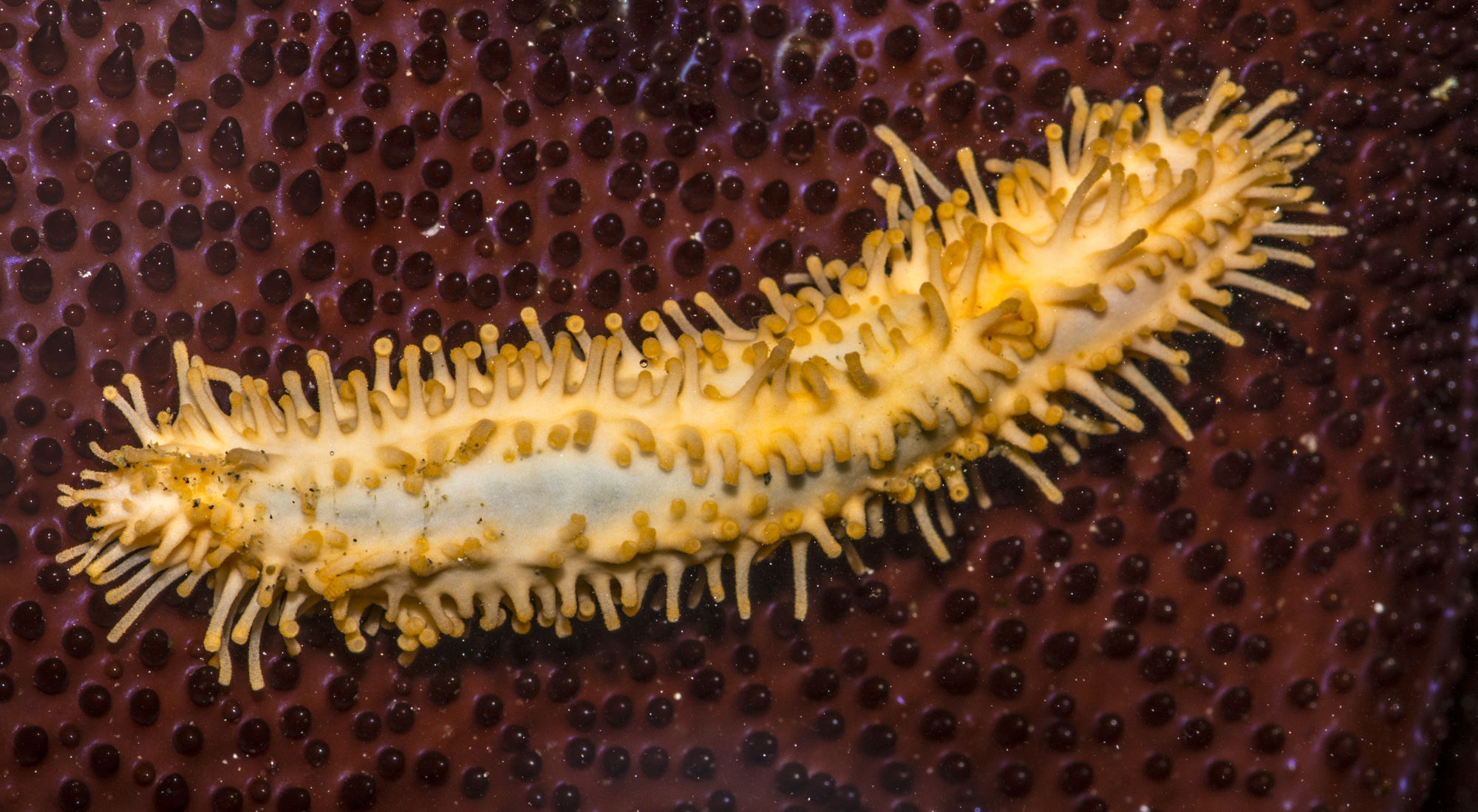
- Eupentacta quinquesemita

Scientific classification
- Kingdom: Animalia
- Phylum: Echinodermata
- Class: Holothuroidea
- Order: Dendrochirotida
- Family: Sclerodactylidae
- Genus: Eupentacta; Deichmann, 1938

= Eupentacta =

Genus of echinoderms

Eupentacta is a genus of sea cucumbers found in coastal waters in tropical and temperate regions.

== Characteristics ==
Like other members of the family Sclerodactylidae, members of Eupentacta are characterised by the complex ring of ossicles they have near the anterior end. These may or may not take the form of a short tube, but are quite unlike the long tubes found in the phyllophorids. The tentacles number ten to twenty.

== Species ==
- Eupentacta exigua (Ludwig, 1875)
- Eupentacta fraudatrix (D'yakonov & Baranova in D'yakonov, Baranova & Savel'eva, 1958)
- Eupentacta pseudoquinquesemita Deichmann, 1938
- Eupentacta quinquesemita (Selenka, 1867)
