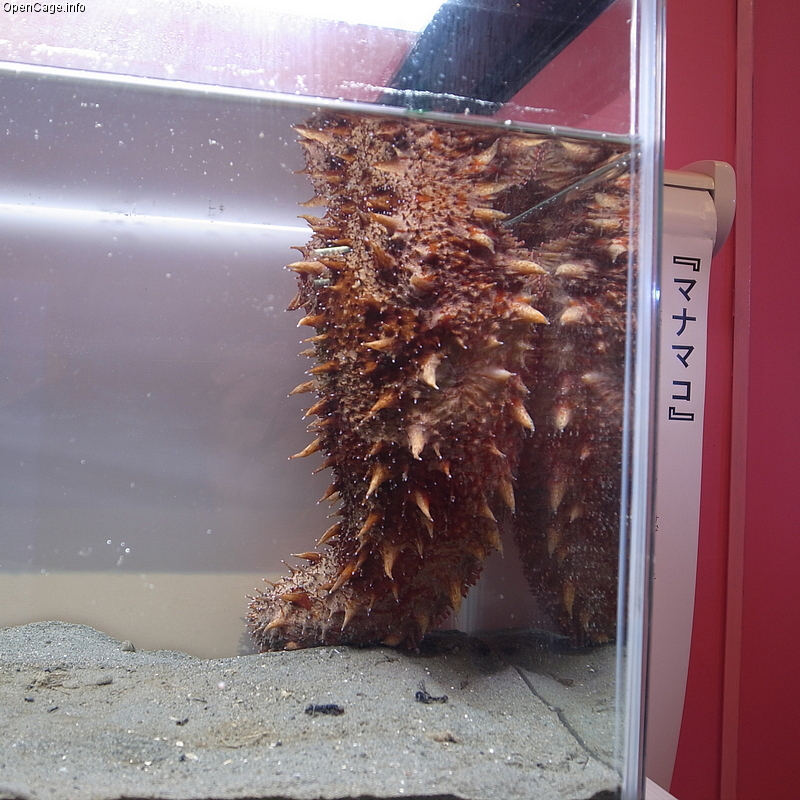

Conservation status
- Endangered (IUCN 3.1)

Scientific classification
- Kingdom: Animalia
- Phylum: Echinodermata
- Class: Holothuroidea
- Order: Synallactida
- Family: Stichopodidae
- Genus: Apostichopus
- Species: A. japonicus

Binomial name
- Apostichopus japonicus (Selenka, 1867)

Synonyms
- Holothuria armata Selenka, 1867; Stichopus japonicus Selenka, 1867; Stichopus japonicus var. typicus Théel, 1886; Stichopus roseus Augustin, 1908

= Apostichopus japonicus =

Species of sea cucumber

Apostichopus japonicus is a species of sea cucumber in the family Stichopodidae. It is found in shallow temperate waters along the coasts of south east Asia and is commonly known as the Japanese spiky sea cucumber or the Japanese sea cucumber.

== Description ==
The Japanese sea cucumber has a cylindrical leathery body with blunt, thorny protuberances. At the anterior or front end there is a mouth surrounded by a ring of short feeding tentacles and at the posterior end is the anus. There are three different colour morphs, red, green and black.

== Distribution and habitat ==
The Japanese sea cucumber is found along the coast of Russia, China, Japan and Korea. The range extends from Alaska and Sakhalin Island to the Amami Islands, Japan. The red morphs are found on gravel beds offshore at depths of 40 metres (130 ft) or deeper while the other two colours are found intermingled on muddy and sandy bottoms at shallower depths. Although the red morph may breed red offspring due to its reproductive isolation in a different microhabitat, DNA studies have shown that there is a limited degree of genetic difference between it and the other two colour morphs while there is no significant difference between the black and green forms. In lagoons in southern Sakhalin, Russia, Japanese spiky sea cucumber are found on solid substrates among growth of the red alga Ahnfeltia tobuchiensis and in oyster beds (Crassostrea gigas).

== Biology ==
The Japanese sea cucumber sifts through the sediment on the seabed with its tentacles and feeds on detritus and other organic matter including plant and animal remains, bacteria, protozoa, diatoms and faeces.

The sexes are separate in the Japanese sea cucumber. Males and females release a mass of gametes into the sea where fertilization takes place. In the laboratory, spawning from ripe gonads can be induced by varying the temperature at which the adults are kept or by use of the neuropeptide cubifrin. The planktonic larvae develop through several stages before settling on hard surfaces on the seabed, undergoing metamorphosis and becoming juveniles.

The Japanese sea cucumber lives in temperate seas. In locations where the water heats up excessively in summer it undergoes aestivation, going into a state of dormancy. In this state, feeding stops, the gut degenerates, the metabolism slows down and weight is lost. The threshold temperature is about 25 °C (77 °F), higher for smaller individuals and for those from the southern part of the range where the ambient water temperature is higher. This sea cucumber has been known to continue in aestivation in some areas of China for four years.

== Use as food ==
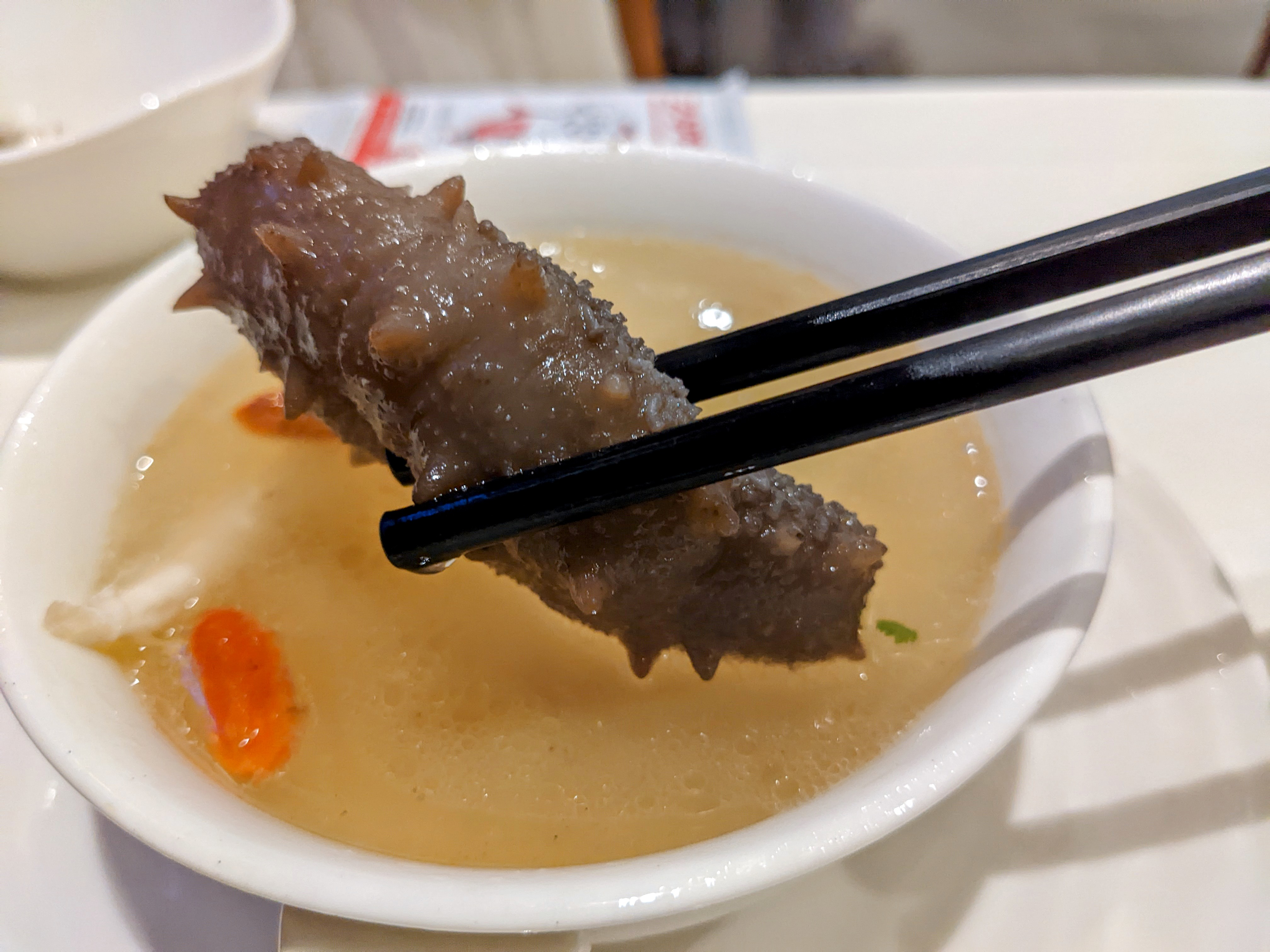
Japanese sea cucumber served Putian style in soup

The Japanese sea cucumber is used as food. The largest fishery is in Japan where between 2000 and 2005, an average of 8,101 tonnes of this species were harvested annually. The red form is known there as "aka namako" and sells at a different price from "ao namako", the green morph and "kuro namako", the black one. In Russia and North Korea, overfishing has reduced populations considerably. Fishing methods include diving and hand collection at depths of up to 20 metres (66 ft) and the use of trawls at greater depths. In the 1920s, a "sea cucumber fork" was developed in China. It is operated from several small vessels working together and allows harvest from depths of up to 60 metres (200 ft).

The Japanese sea cucumber is also cultivated on a commercial scale in shallow ponds and by sea ranching in northern China, where production reached 5,865 tonnes in 2002. Rocks and tiles are placed on the bottom to provide settlement for larvae and protection from predators. Breeding programs are under way to improve growth rates and disease resistance and the genome is being sequenced. Hatchery techniques are being developed in Japan and China as are the preparation of suitable culture feeds and the investigation of the best methods of ranching. Albino forms and a thermally resistant strain that is less prone to aestivate are being developed in China.
