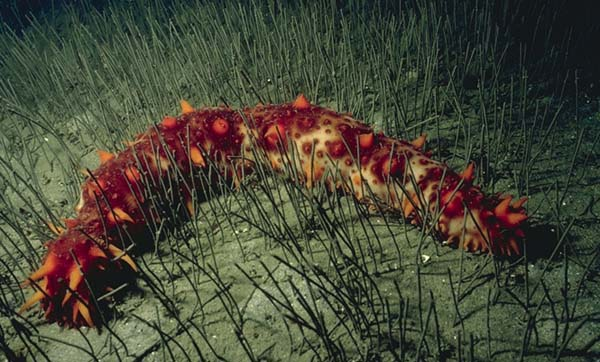
- Apostichopus californicus

Scientific classification
- Kingdom: Animalia
- Phylum: Echinodermata
- Class: Holothuroidea
- Order: Synallactida
- Family: Stichopodidae
- Genus: Apostichopus; Liao, 1986

= Apostichopus =

Genus of echinoderms

Apostichopus is a genus of sea cucumbers in the family Stichopodidae. They occur from the intertidal zone down to depths of 20–40 m (70–130 ft).

== Species ==
The following species are recognised in the genus Apostichopus:

- Apostichopus armatus (Selenka, 1867)
- Apostichopus californicus (Stimpson, 1857)
- Apostichopus japonicus (Selenka, 1867)
- Apostichopus johnsoni (Théel, 1886)
- Apostichopus leukothele (Lambert, 1986)
- Apostichopus multidentis (Imaoka, 1991)
- Apostichopus nigripunctatus (Augustin, 1908)
- Apostichopus parvimensis (Clark, 1913)
