= Thyonicola dogieli =

Scientific classification
- Kingdom: Animalia
- Phylum: Mollusca
- Class: Gastropoda
- Subclass: Caenogastropoda
- Order: Littorinimorpha
- Family: Eulimidae
- Genus: Thyonicola
- Species: T. dogieli

Binomial name
- Thyonicola dogieli (A. V. Ivanov, 1945)

Synonyms
- Parenteroxenos dogieli A. V. Ivanov, 1945

Species of gastropod

Thyonicola dogieli is a parasitic species of gastropod mollusc in the family Eulimidae. It parasitises sea cucumbers in the northeastern Pacific Ocean.

== Description ==
This slender elongated mollusc does not have a shell and takes the form of a long tube, coiled like a spring, or tied in knots, and filled with eggs. It holds the record as the longest gastropod mollusc in the world, one individual having been found to be 128 cm (50 in) long when uncoiled.

== Ecology ==
Thyonicola dogieli is a parasite of sea cucumbers such as Cucumaria miniata. It inhabits the gut of the sea cucumber, being attached at the anterior end. It has no digestive tract and absorbs nutrients through its cuticle. It is a hermaphrodite; the testis is located near the anterior end and the ovary near the posterior end (this enables the sperm to be carried to the eggs amid the flow of the contents of the host's gut). The body is filled with maturing eggs enclosed in cocoons. When the veliger larvae, which have miniature coiled shells and operculums, are sufficiently developed, the cocoons are released into the sea cucumber's gut and pass out into the sea with its faeces.

On encountering sea water the cocoons burst open and the free-living larvae are liberated. They are about 0.1 mm (0.004 in) long, and unless swallowed by a sea cucumber, they will soon die, However, any that are ingested undergo metamorphosis in the host's gut, lose their shell and mantle and burrow into the wall of the gut with the aid of a glandular secretion. As the juvenile mollusc grows, its posterior end pushes its way into the sea cucumber's body cavity, and the gonads develop, the interior of the mollusc becoming a brood pouch.
