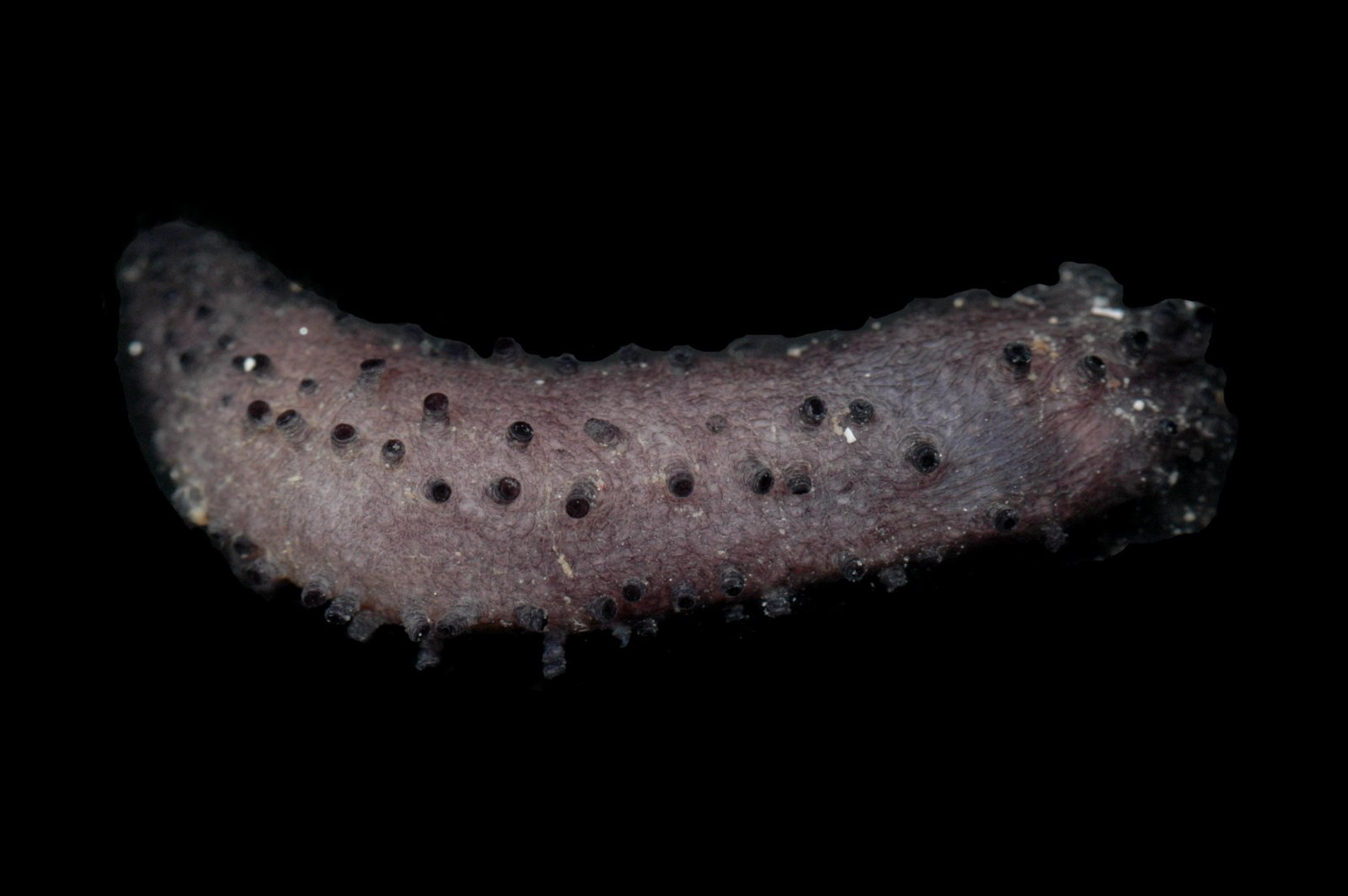
- Afrocucumis africana

Scientific classification
- Kingdom: Animalia
- Phylum: Echinodermata
- Class: Holothuroidea
- Order: Dendrochirotida
- Family: Sclerodactylidae
- Genus: Afrocucumis; Deichmann, 1944

Synonyms
- Discucumaria Clark, 1946

= Afrocucumis =

Genus of echinoderms

Afrocucumis is a genus of sea cucumbers found in coastal waters in tropical and temperate regions.

== Characteristics ==
Like other members of the family Sclerodactylidae, members of the genus Afrocucumis are characterised by the complex ring of ossicles they have near the anterior end. These may or may not take the form of a short tube, but are quite unlike the long tubes found in the phyllophorids. The tentacles number ten to twenty.

== Species ==
- Afrocucumis africana (Semper, 1867)
- Afrocucumis ovulum (Selenka, 1867)
- Afrocucumis stracki Massin, 1996
