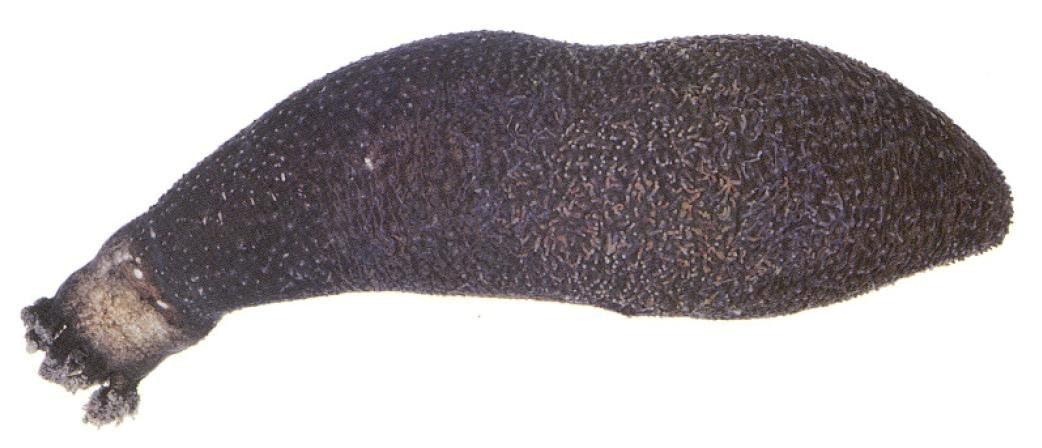

Conservation status
- Secure (NatureServe)

Scientific classification
- Kingdom: Animalia
- Phylum: Echinodermata
- Class: Holothuroidea
- Order: Dendrochirotida
- Family: Sclerodactylidae
- Genus: Sclerodactyla
- Species: S. briareus

Binomial name
- Sclerodactyla briareus (Lesueur, 1824)

Synonyms
- Anaperus carolinus Troschel, 1846; Holothuria briareus Lesueur, 1824; Thyone briareus Lesueur, 1824; Thyone tenella Selenka, 1867; Thyonidium glabrum Ayres, 1851; Thyonidium musculosum Ayres, 1851

= Sclerodactyla briareus =

Hairy sea cucumber

Species of sea cucumber

Sclerodactyla briareus, commonly known as the hairy sea cucumber, is a species of marine invertebrate in the family Sclerodactylidae. It is found in shallow waters in the western Atlantic Ocean.

== Description ==
Sclerodactyla briareus is an elongated oval or cigar-shaped sea cucumber and grows to about 15 centimetres (5.9 in). It often adopts a characteristic pose with both ends raised above the substrate. At the anterior end there is a mouth surrounded by a ring of ten, short, branched feeding tentacles. These are modified tube feet that can be retracted back into the mouth when the animal is not feeding. The surface of the body is divided into five ambulacral areas with five shallow interambulacral grooves in between. Internally there are five bands of muscle running along the ambulacrae and there are also transverse bands of muscles. Just behind the tentacles is a group of small ossicles, calcareous stiffening plates, forming a short tube surrounding the pharynx. These provide a skeletal support for the muscles and internal organs. The skin is thick and leathery and the tube feet are scattered rather than being in orderly rows, protruding as soft finger-like projections from the body wall. The minute calcareous spicules that are embedded in the skin are characteristic for the species, being square or round and table-shaped with spires formed of four pillars. The color is dark greenish-brown or charcoal grey with pale grey tentacles on blackish stems.

== Distribution ==
Sclerodactyla briareus is found in shallow water along the east coast of the United States from Massachusetts to Florida, plus the Gulf of Mexico, the Caribbean Sea, and extending southward as far as Venezuela.

== Biology ==
Sclerodactyla briareus is a scavenger and filter feeder, collecting organic matter with its feeding tentacles and thrusting the particles into its mouth. It is gonochoristic with individuals being either male or female although there is no outward difference in appearance. Fertilization is external and the developing larvae form part of the plankton.

Sclerodactyla briareus burrows in soft substrates and is more tolerant than many other echinoderms of water with low salinity levels or low oxygen levels. If threatened by predators it can eject its viscera in a sticky white mass to confuse and deter the aggressor.
