= Thyonicola =

Scientific classification
- Kingdom: Animalia
- Phylum: Mollusca
- Class: Gastropoda
- Subclass: Caenogastropoda
- Order: Littorinimorpha
- Family: Eulimidae
- Genus: Thyonicola; Mandahl-Barth, 1941

Type species
- Thyonicola mortenseni Mandahl-Barth, 1941

Synonyms
- Parenteroxenos A. V. Ivanov, 1945

Genus of gastropods

Thyonicola is a genus of parasitic sea snails, marine gastropod mollusks or micromollusks in the Eulimidae family.

== Species ==
Species within the genera Thyonicola include:

- Thyonicola americana Tikasingh, 1961
- Thyonicola dogieli (A. V. Ivanov, 1945)
- Thyonicola mortenseni Mandahl-Barth, 1941
