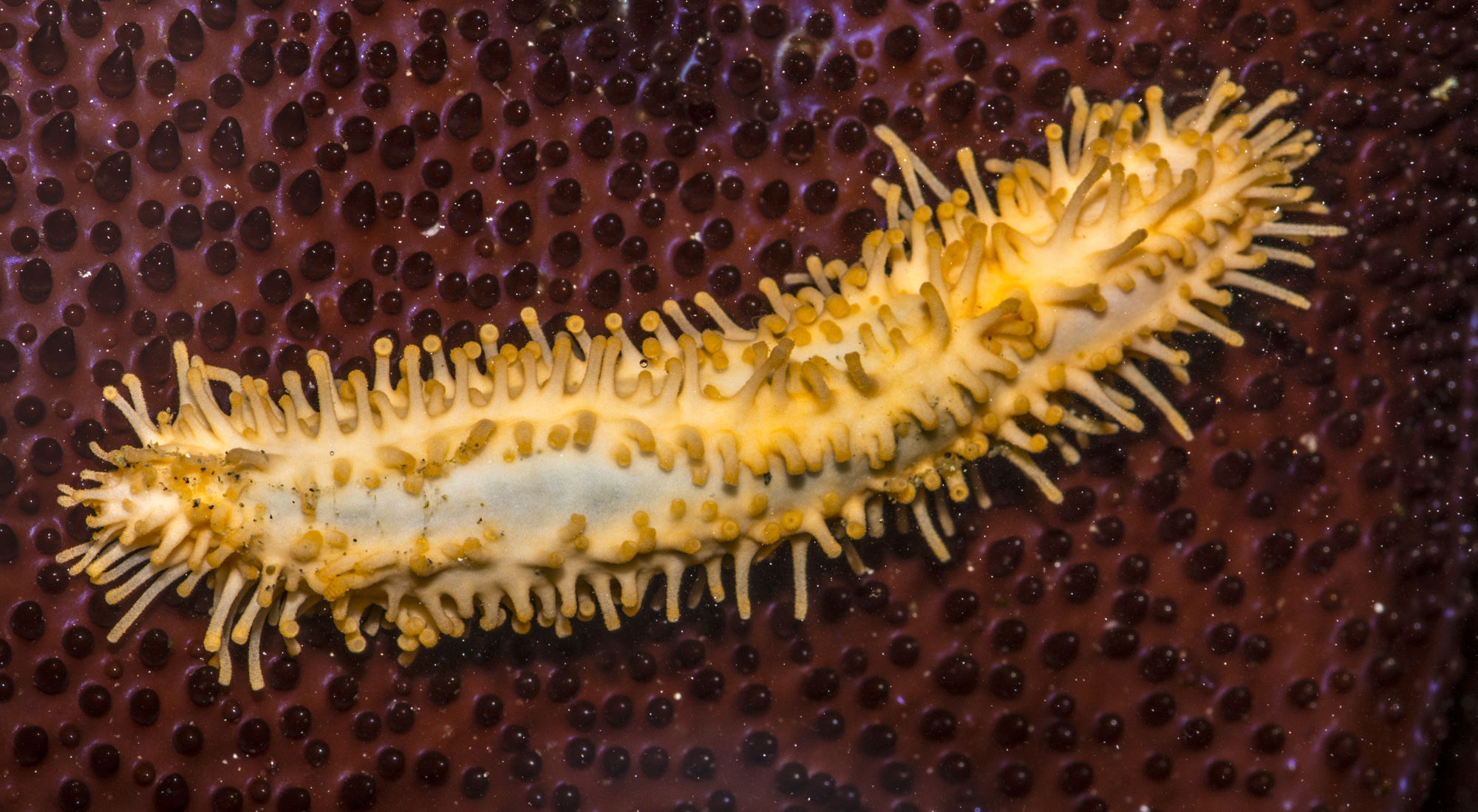

Conservation status
- Secure (NatureServe)

Scientific classification
- Kingdom: Animalia
- Phylum: Echinodermata
- Class: Holothuroidea
- Order: Dendrochirotida
- Family: Sclerodactylidae
- Genus: Eupentacta
- Species: E. quinquesemita

Binomial name
- Eupentacta quinquesemita (Selenka, 1867)

Synonyms
- Cucumaria chronhjelmi Théel, 1886; Cucumaria quinquesemita Selenka, 1867; Eupentacta chronhjelmi (Théel, 1886)

= Eupentacta quinquesemita =

Species of sea cucumber

Eupentacta quinquesemita is a species of sea cucumber, a marine invertebrate with an elongated body, a leathery skin and tentacles surrounding the mouth. It is commonly known as the stiff-footed sea cucumber or white sea cucumber, and occurs on rocky coasts in the northeastern Pacific Ocean.

== Description ==
Eupentacta quinquesemita can grow to a length of up to 8 cm (3 in). The tube feet are arranged in four longitudinal rows; they are non-retractable and give the animal a spiny appearance. The skin between the tube feet is smooth, but both body wall and tube feet contain calcareous ossicles that make them stiff. The mouth is surrounded by ten branched feeding tentacles, the two lowest ones being smaller than the rest. The general body colour is white, the tentacles (often the only parts of the animal that are visible) being creamy-white, often with yellowish or pinkish bases. Bits of shell or other fragments often adhere to the tube feet.

== Distribution and habitat ==
E. quinquesemita is found in the northeastern Pacific Ocean, its range extending from Alaska to California. It is found on rocky shores in low intertidal and shallow subtidal zones, where it tends to hide itself in crevices and under boulders. It is common among harbour installations, pilings and floats, especially where there is vigorous water movement. Larvae often settle in locations with strong currents among hydroids and algae.

== Ecology ==
A deposit and suspension feeder, E. quinquesemita uses its feeding tentacles to push material into its mouth, extracting the edible material and eliminating the unwanted debris. The larvae of a parasitic snail, Thyonicola americana, enter in this way and develop into adults which invade the viscera while maintaining a connection to the gut lumen to release offspring. The sea cucumber is preyed on by several species of starfish, such as Solaster stimpsoni, Pycnopodia helianthoides and Leptasterias hexactis, and fish such as the kelp greenling (Hexagrammos decagrammus).

This sea cucumber exhibits a seasonal pattern of evisceration, expelling its guts in the autumn and growing a new set in the spring, resulting in a high proportion of T. americana parasites not completing their life cycle, but not all individuals do this. Breeding takes place between March and May, females liberating large, yolky eggs into the sea where they are fertilised by sperm produced by the males. The larvae are well-ciliated but do not feed, developing their calcareous armour in about a fortnight before settling.
