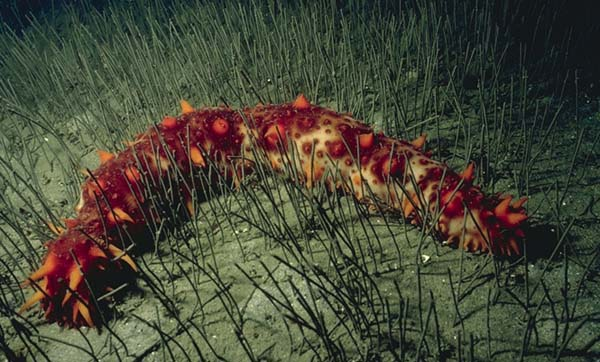

Conservation status
- Vulnerable (IUCN 3.1)

- Secure (NatureServe)

Scientific classification
- Kingdom: Animalia
- Phylum: Echinodermata
- Class: Holothuroidea
- Order: Synallactida
- Family: Stichopodidae
- Genus: Apostichopus
- Species: A. californicus

Binomial name
- Apostichopus californicus (Stimpson, 1857)

Synonyms
- Holothuria californica Stimpson, 1857; Parastichopus californicus (Stimpson, 1857); Stichopus californicus (Stimpson, 1857)

= California sea cucumber =

Species of sea cucumber

The California sea cucumber (Apostichopus californicus), also known as the giant California sea cucumber, is a sea cucumber that can be found from the Gulf of Alaska to Baja California. It is found from the low intertidal zone to a depth of 250 m (820 ft). They are most abundant in areas with moderate current with cobbles, boulders or bedrock. They are artisanally fished.

== Description ==
The California sea cucumber can grow to a length of 50 cm (1 ft 8 in) and a width of 5 cm (2 in). It has a soft, cylindrical body, with red-brown to yellowish leathery skin. It has an endoskeleton just below the skin. The mouth and anus are on opposite ends of the body. The mouth is surrounded by twenty retractable tentacles that are used to bring food in. Five rows of tube feet extend from the mouth to the anus. They use their tube feet located on the underside of their body to attach themselves to rocks.

== Feeding ==
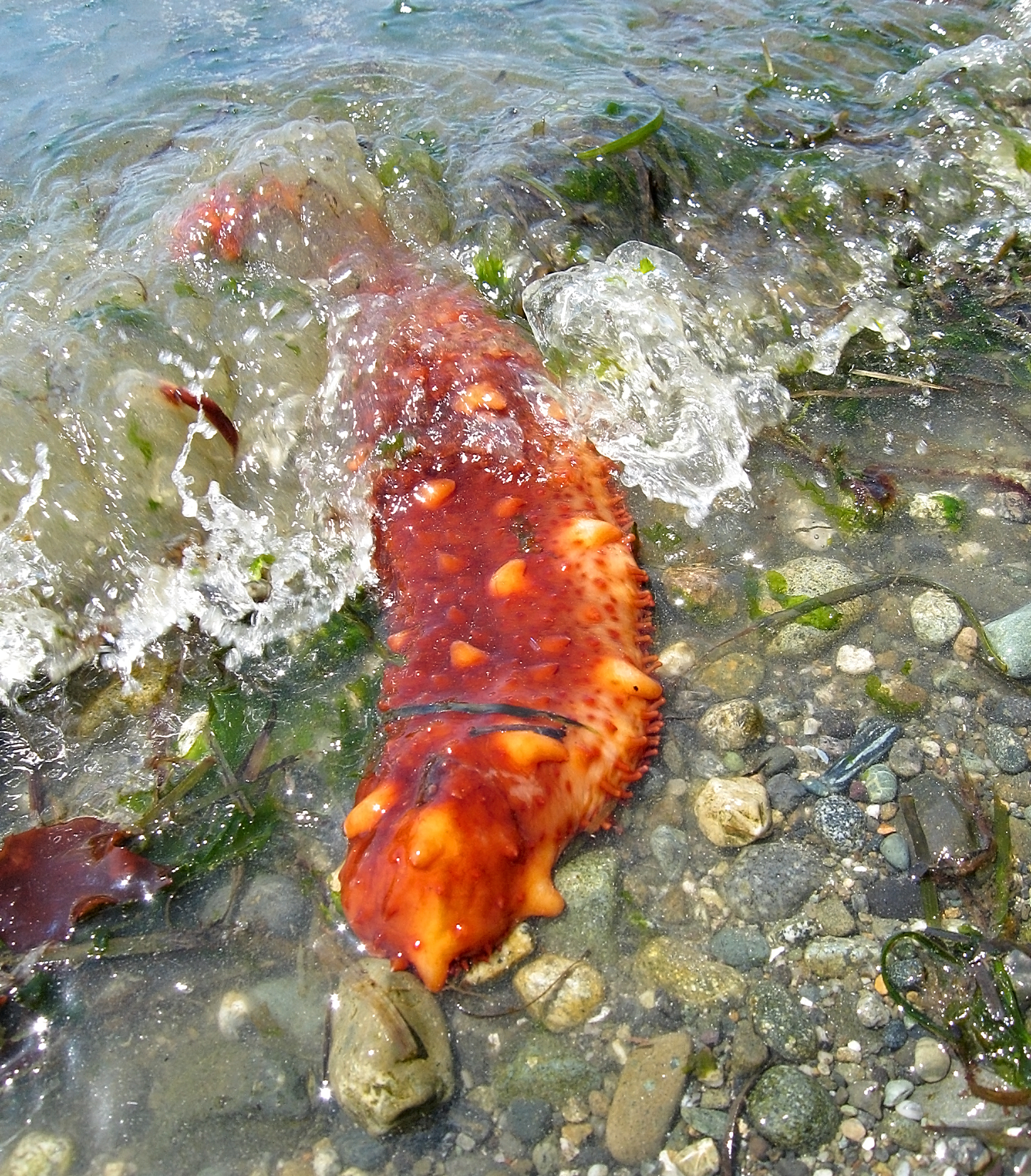
A. californicus at ebb/low tide, Saratoga Passage

The California sea cucumber is a scavenger that feeds on organic matter. They feed by sifting through sediments with their tentacles, or by positioning themselves in a current where they can use their tentacles to catch food flowing by. They can live to be 10 years old.

== Behavior and reproduction ==
A. californicus is a solitary nocturnal animal. When threatened, it can eviscerate, expelling its organs through its anus. It can also expel sticky filaments to ensnare or confuse predators.

These sea cucumbers have separate sexes, and eggs are fertilized externally. Spawning usually takes place in August, and each female can produce thousands of eggs. After fertilization, a larva is formed which metamorphoses into a sea cucumber after a few weeks.
