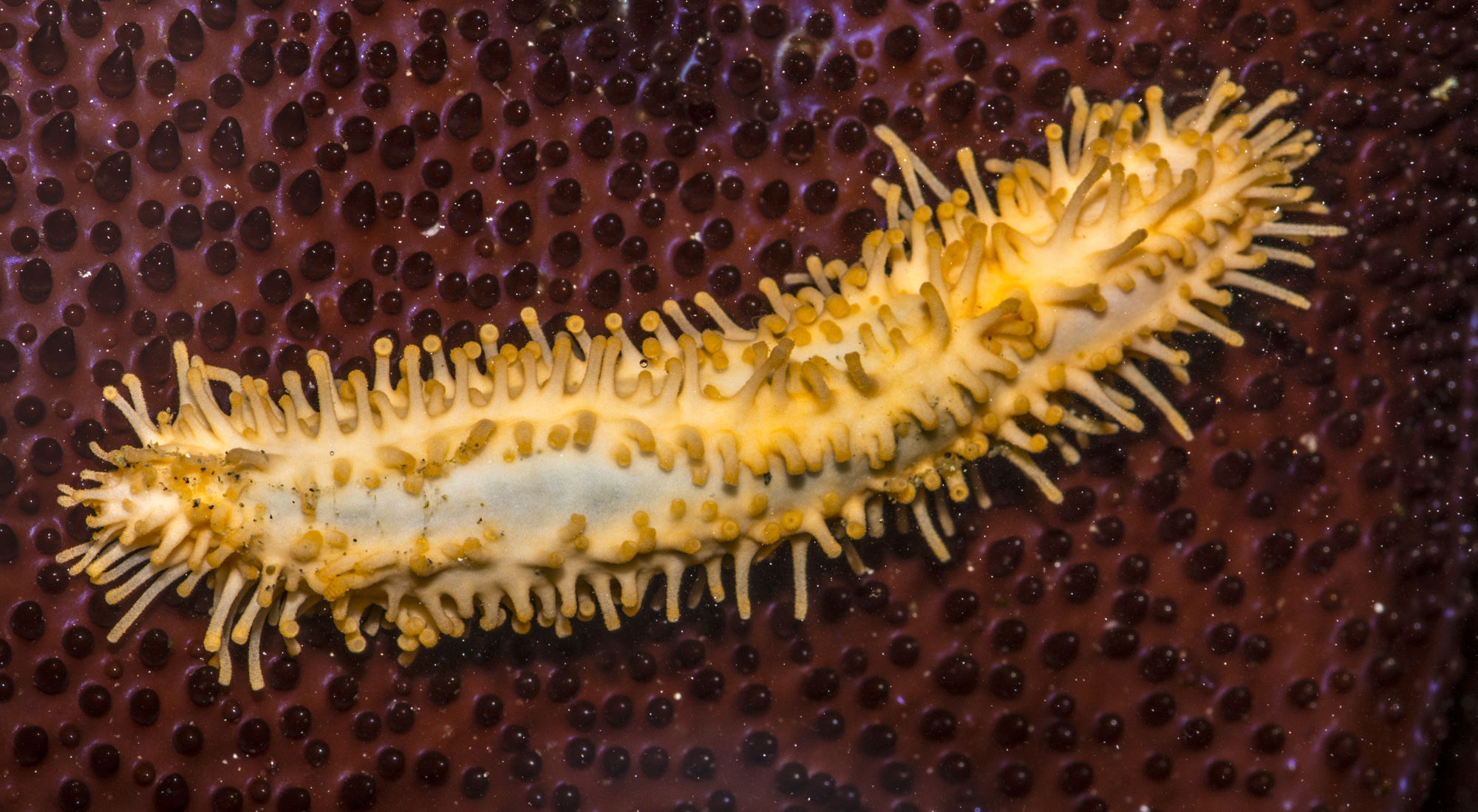
- Eupentacta quinquesemita

Scientific classification
- Kingdom: Animalia
- Phylum: Echinodermata
- Class: Holothuroidea
- Order: Dendrochirotida
- Family: Sclerodactylidae; Panning, 1902

Genera
- See text

= Sclerodactylidae =

Family of sea cucumbers

Sclerodactylidae is a family of sea cucumbers, marine invertebrates with elongated bodies, leathery skins and tentacles.

Members of the family are characterised by the complex ring of ossicles they have near the anterior end. These may or may not take the form of a short tube but are quite unlike the long tubes found in the phyllophorids. The tentacles number ten to twenty.

== Genera ==
The World Register of Marine Species recognizes the following genera:

- genus Afrocucumis Deichmann, 1944
- genus Apentamera Deichmann, 1941
- genus Athyone Deichmann, 1941
- genus Cladolabes Brandt, 1835
- genus Clarkiella Heding in Heding & Panning, 1954
- genus Coronatum Martins & Souto in Martins, Souto & Menegola, 2012
- genus Deichmannia Cherbonnier, 1958
- genus Engeliella Cherbonnier, 1968
- genus Eupentacta Deichmann, 1938
- genus Euthyonidiella Heding & Panning, 1954
- genus Globosita Cherbonnier, 1958
- genus Havelockia Pearson, 1903
- genus Neopentamera Deichmann, 1941
- genus Neothyone Deichmann, 1941
- genus Ohshimella Heding & Panning, 1954
- genus Pachythyone Deichmann, 1941
- genus Pseudothyone Panning, 1949
- genus Sclerodactyla Ayres, 1851
- genus Sclerothyone Thandar, 1989
- genus Temparena Thandar, 1989
- genus Thandarum Martinez & Brogger, 2012
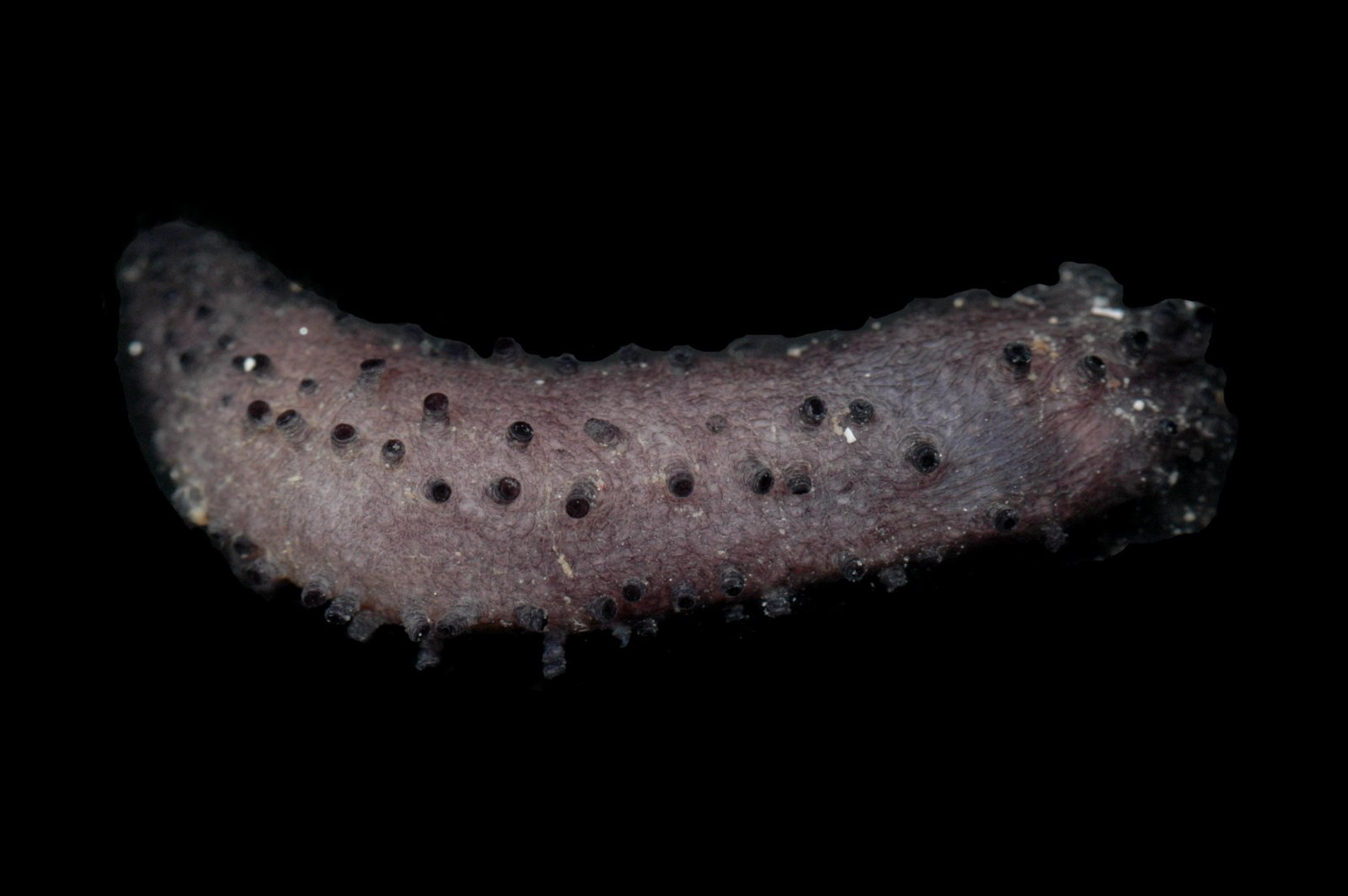
Afrocucumis africana

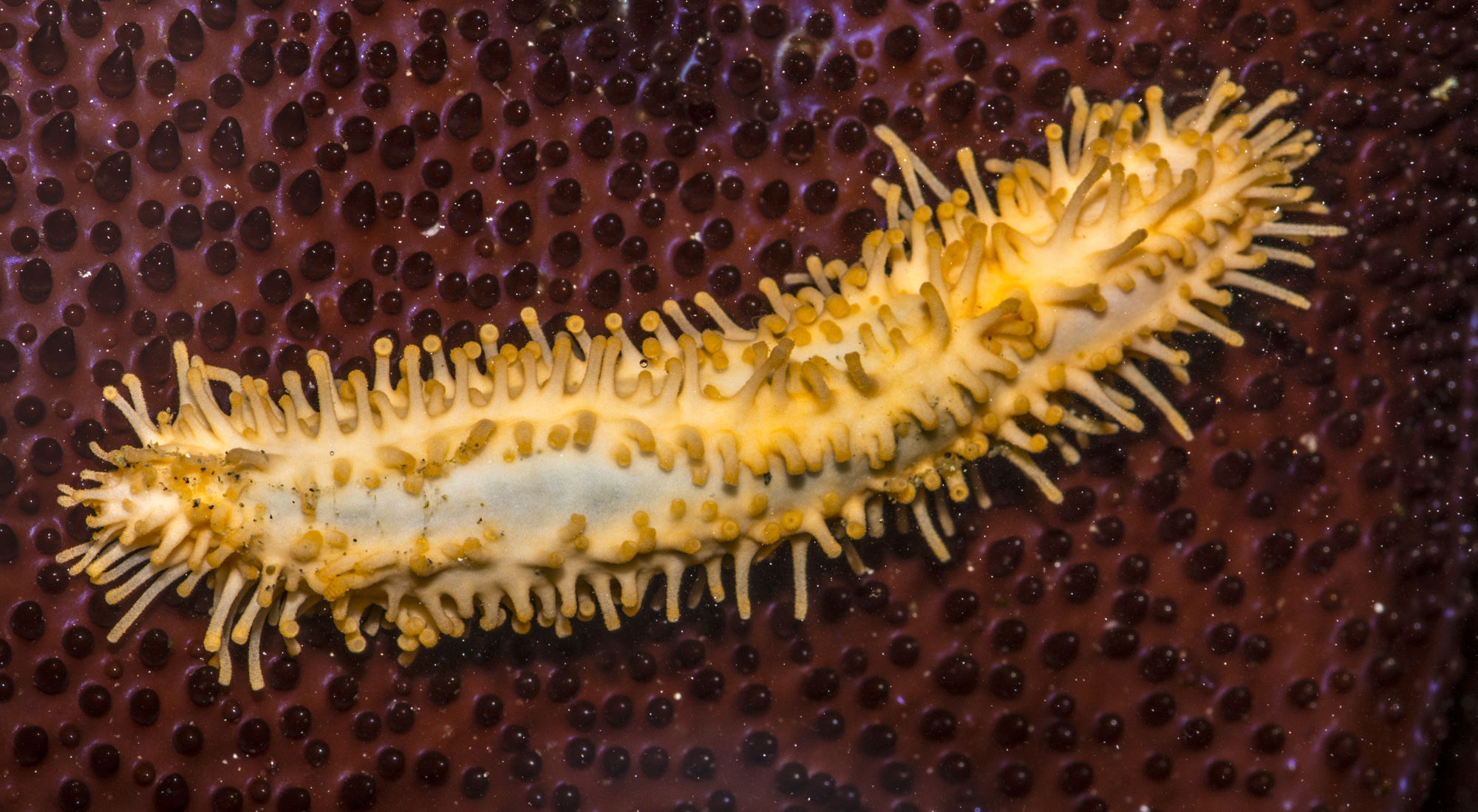
Eupentacta quinquesemita

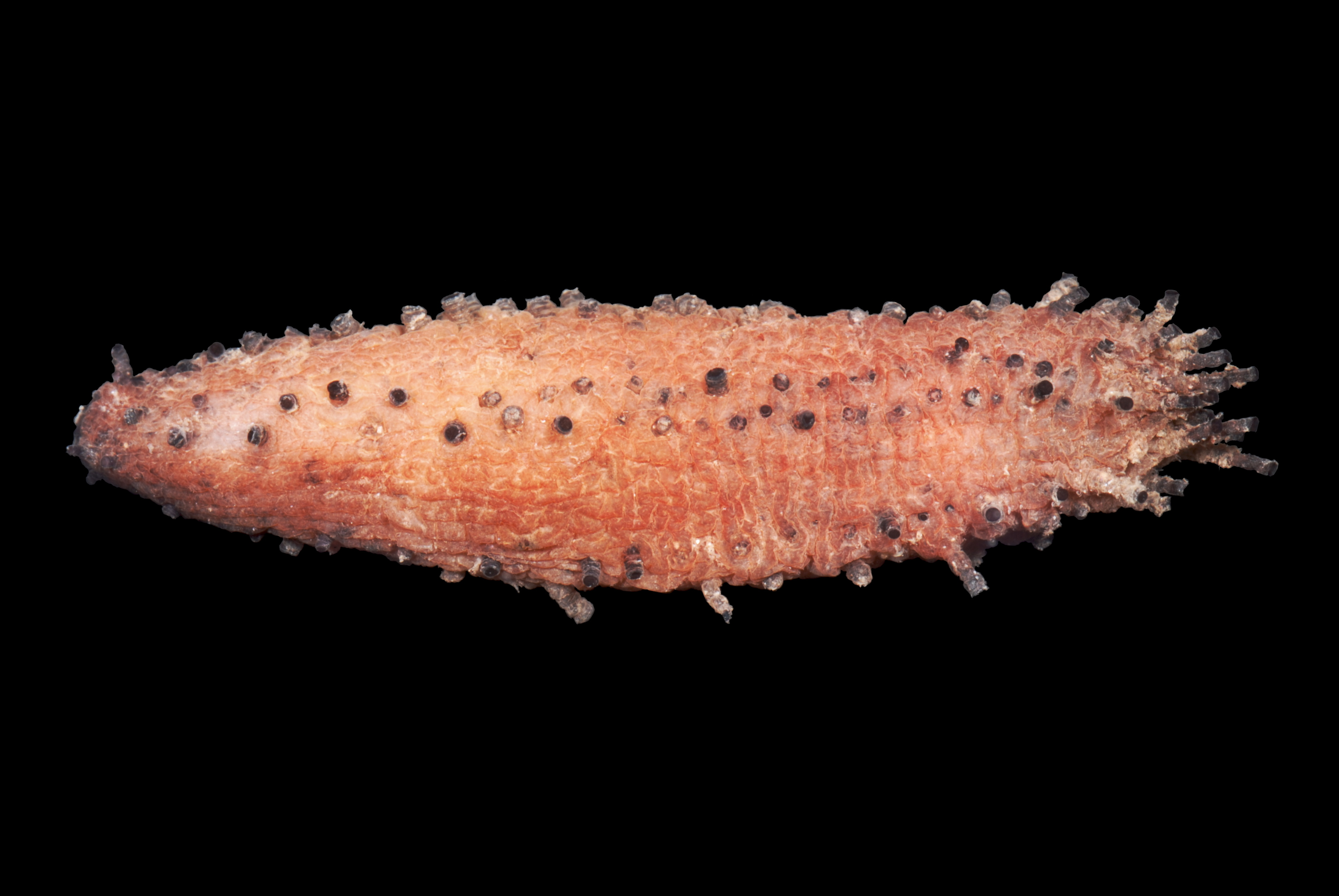
Ohshimella ehrenbergii

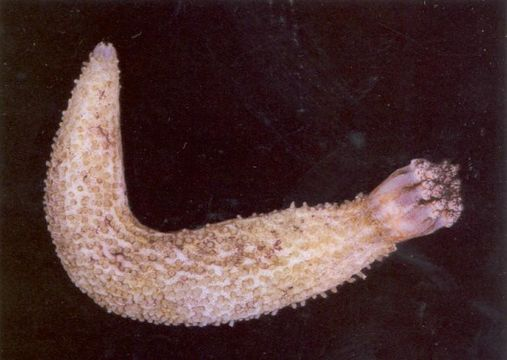
Pseudothyone belli

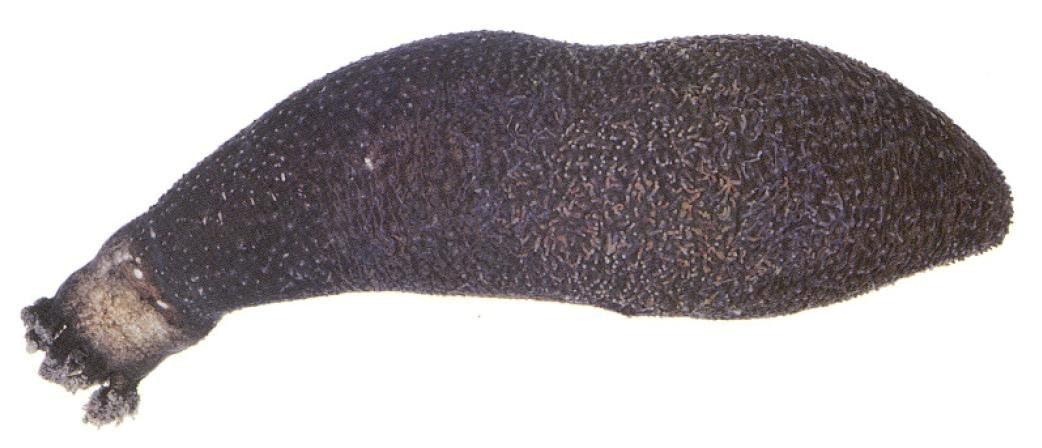
Sclerodactyla briareus

== See also ==
- Sclerodactyla briareus
