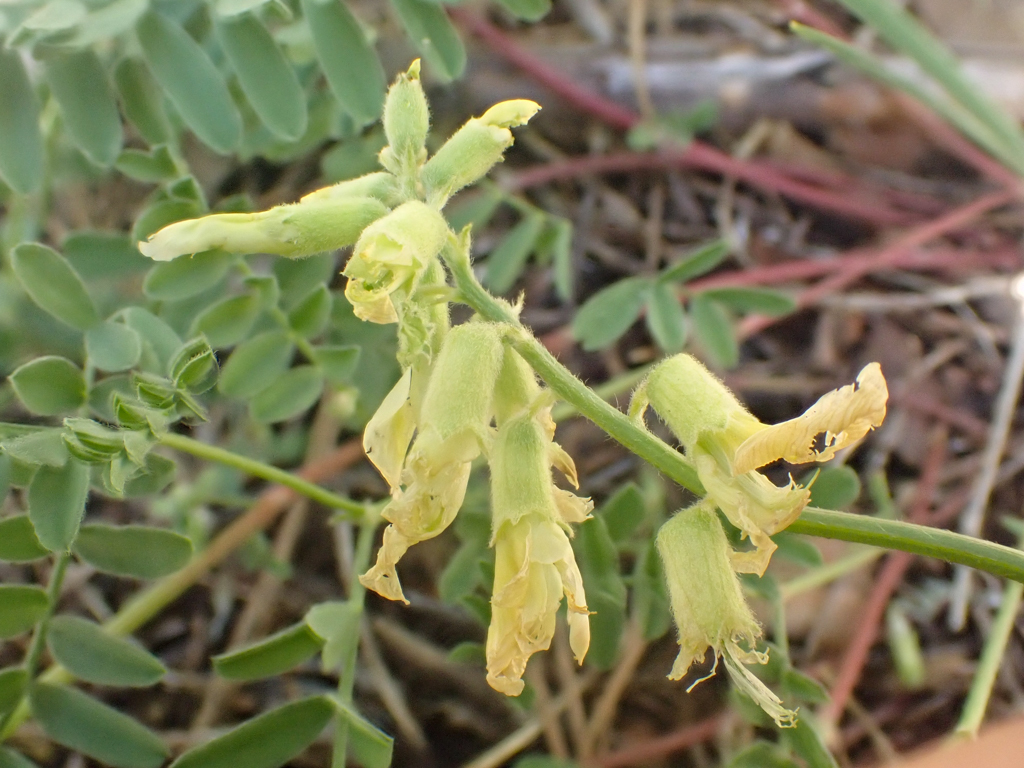

Conservation status
- Vulnerable (NatureServe)

Scientific classification
- Kingdom: Plantae
- Clade: Tracheophytes
- Clade: Angiosperms
- Clade: Eudicots
- Clade: Rosids
- Order: Fabales
- Family: Fabaceae
- Subfamily: Faboideae
- Genus: Astragalus
- Species: A. californicus

Binomial name
- Astragalus californicus (A.Gray) Greene

= Astragalus californicus =

Klamath Basin milkvetch

Species of legume

Astragalus californicus is a species of milkvetch known by the common name Klamath Basin milkvetch.

It is native to the Klamath Mountains and surrounding High Cascade Ranges of northern California and southern Oregon, where it grows in scrub and woodland habitat.

== Description ==
Astragalus californicus is a perennial herb forming a sturdy open clump of upright stems growing up to 1.5 feet (0.46 m) tall. The leaves are several centimeters long and made up of green leaflike leaflets.

The inflorescence is a loose array of light yellow to cream-colored pealike flowers, each between 1 and 2 centimeters long.

The fruit is a hanging legume pod 3 or 4 centimeters long. It is flat and narrow, with a hairy surface, and it dries to a thick papery texture.
