= Evisceration (autotomy) =

Ejection of internal organs by animals as a defensive strategy

Evisceration is a method of autotomy involving the ejection of internal organs used by animals as a defensive strategy. Sea cucumbers (Holothuroidea) eject parts of the gut in order to scare and defend against potential predators such as crabs and fish. The organs are regenerated in a few weeks by cells in the interior of the sea cucumber.

== Description ==
When stressed, the sea cucumber faces away from the attacker and contracts its body wall muscles sharply. This causes the wall of the cloaca to tear and the anus to gape. The evisceration process in Eupentacta quinquesemita proceeds as follows:

1. Three main structures weaken over a period of about 1–3 minutes, become soft and transparent, and eventually separate from their attachments. These are the basal part of the tentacles, the attachment points of the introvert retractor muscles to the longitudinal muscles (there are 10 of these), and the junction of intestine and cloaca. The softening is a state-transformation of the collagen components in the tissue.
2. Parts eviscerated include the gut, associated haemal vessels, tentacles, and introvert (the dexterous anterior extensible portion of the body wall). The gut tears away from the mesenteries that suspend it within the coelomic cavity.
3. Most of the gonad stays behind. Only strands of gonad tangled in the gut are eviscerated. The paired respiratory trees and cloaca also remain (although they may be expelled in other species)
4. The introvert changes from being firm and opaque to being soft and translucent. The body-wall muscles contract and the increased pressure forces coelomic fluid and viscera into the introvert. It enlarges like a balloon and soon ruptures, expelling the fluid and viscera.
5. This takes about 20 minutes, with final detachment of the tentacles and introvert sometimes taking as long as 12 hours.
6. The anterior rupture seals, at first by muscular contraction and then by healing as a plug of connective-tissue.

== Function ==
During evisceration in some species, several hundred Cuvierian tubules (part of the respiratory tree) may be expelled. Water from the respiratory tree is forced into these tubules causing a rapid expansion and they elongate by up to 20 times their original length. They have great tensile strength and become sticky when they encounter any object. The adhesive is unique among marine invertebrates and a firm grip is obtained in under ten seconds. The mass of threads can entangle and immobilise potential predators such as small fish or crabs. The threads become detached from the sea cucumber which crawls away. The tubules are readily regenerated, a process that takes about 17 days in Holothuria leucospilota and five weeks in Holothuria forskali. The tubules contain a toxic saponin called holothurin, which is also present in the body wall in some sea cucumber species.

== Occurrence ==
The giant California sea cucumber (Parastichopus californicus) will often eviscerate due to rough handling, temperature shock, or other stressful treatments. The event occurs through the anus and the eviscerated parts are mainly the respiratory trees.

Holothuria arenicola is described as a sea cucumber suitable for keeping in aquaria as it does not eviscerate, whereas the "Australian" sea apple (Paracucumaria tricolor) frequently eviscerates.

== Similar behaviour ==
Some starfish evert their stomachs through their mouths to eat their prey. The starfish then retracts its stomach back inside of its body.

== In popular culture ==
Evisceration plays a role in the Theodore Sturgeon short story "The Girl Had Guts" (Venture Science Fiction, January 1957; also appears in his collection "A Touch of Strange").
